= 2020–2021 Belarusian protests =

Protests against the re-election of president Alexander Lukashenko

- Part of the Belarusian opposition
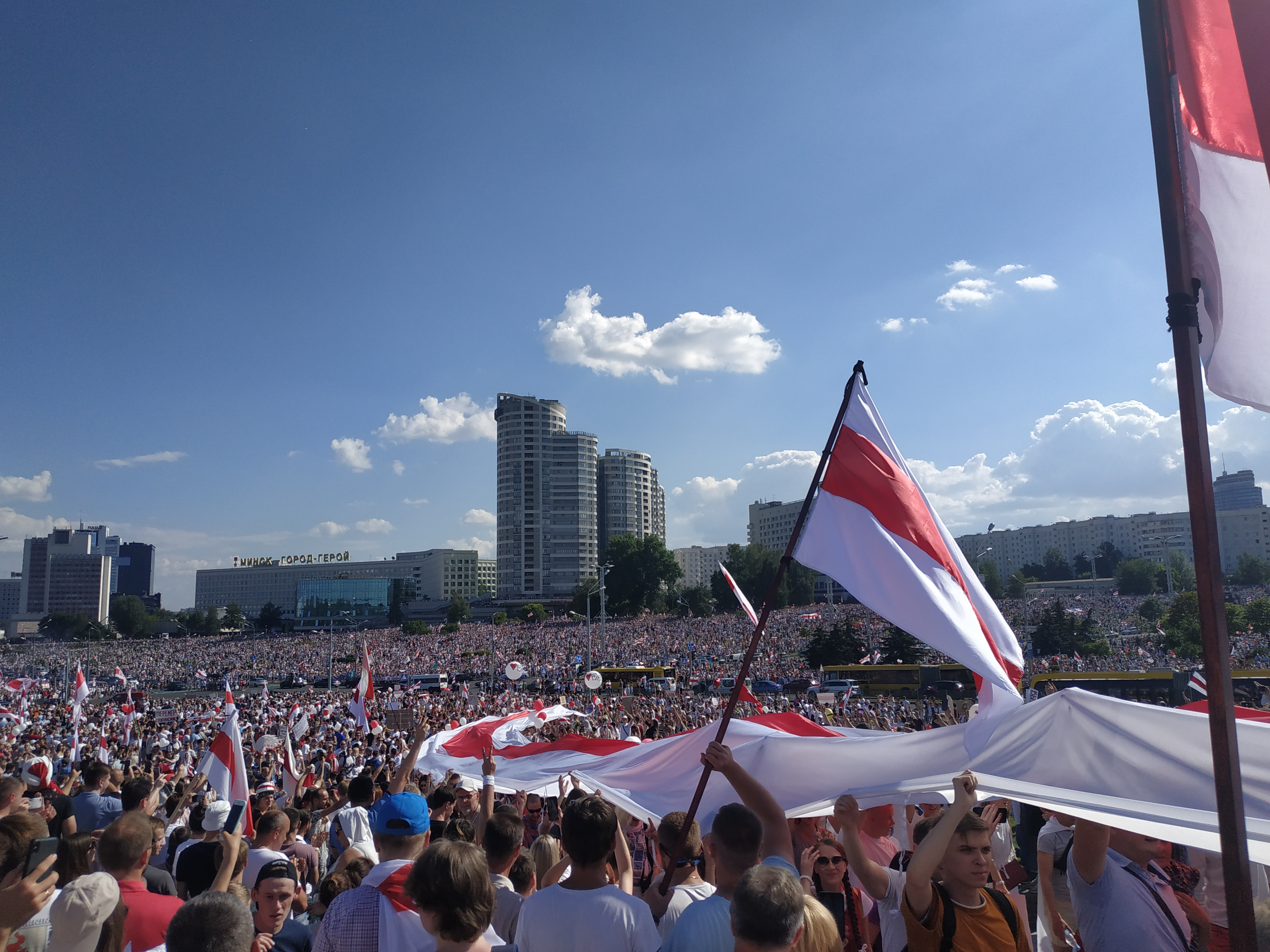
- Protests on 16 August 2020 in Minsk
- Date: 24 May 2020 – 25 March 2021 (10 months and 1 day)
- Location: Belarus
- Caused by: Authoritarianism and political repression; Arrest of opposition presidential candidates Viktar Babaryka and Sergei Tikhanovsky; Persistent electoral fraud in the country's elections; Alexander Lukashenko seeking a sixth presidential term in the 2020 Belarusian presidential election; Economic and social policies of the government; Mishandling of the COVID-19 pandemic in Belarus
- Goals: Resignation of Alexander Lukashenko; Resignation of the government; Economic liberalisation; New free and fair presidential elections; Release of political prisoners; Ending police brutality; Recount of the presidential election
- Methods: Demonstrations; Protest marches; Online activism; Road blockades; Civil disobedience; General strike; Riots
- Result: Protests quelled: No policy/leadership change in response to the protests; Main opposition leaders either in exile or in prison; Intensified authoritarianism moving forward; Emergence of the Belarusian partisan movement

Parties
| Coordination Council (since 14 August); National Strike Committee (since 18 August) Belarusian opposition: Association of Belarusian Students; Christian Democracy; Congress of Democratic Trade Unions; Conservative Christian Party – BPF; Left Party "A Just World"; Movement "For Freedom"; Party of Freedom and Progress; BPF Party; Social Democratic Assembly; Social Democratic Party (Assembly); Social Democratic Party (People's Assembly); United Civic Party; Young Front; Youth Bloc; Anarchists: Revolutionary Action; Anarchist Black Cross; Pramen; Supported by: Rada of the BPR (in exile); Right Alliance; Tell the Truth; BAPC; 30 countries; Belsat TV | Government of Belarus; KGB; Alpha Group; Ministry of Internal Affairs; Internal Troops; OMON; Almaz; Militsiya; GUBOPiK; Armed Forces of Belarus (limited Involvement); 38th Guards Air Assault Brigade; 5th Spetsnaz Brigade; Presidential Security Service (parts); Political parties: Agrarian Party; Communist Party; LDPB; Patriotic Party; BSSP; Republican Party; RPTS; SDPPA; Public associations: Belaya Rus; Federation of Trade Unions of Belarus; Republican Youth Union; Counter-protests; Supported by: Russia |

Lead figures
| Sviatlana Tsikhanouskaya; Sergei Tikhanovsky; Viktar Babaryka; Valery Tsepkalo; Veronika Tsepkalo; Maria Kalesnikava; Pavel Latushko; Mikola Statkevich; Svetlana Alexievich; Paval Sieviaryniec; Zmitser Dashkevich; Maxim Znak; Illia Salei; Tadevuš Kandrusievič | Alexander Lukashenko; Roman Golovchenko; Lidia Yermoshina; Yury Karayeu; Ivan Kubrakov; Andrei Ravkov; Valery Vakulchik; Alexander Volfovich; Viktor Khrenin; Nikolai Karpenkov; Viktor Lukashenko; Vladimir Makei |

Number
| 16 August: Minsk: (Note: Freedom March) 200,000–400,000; Grodno: ~40,000; Mogilev: 10,000+; 23 August: Minsk: (Note: March of New Belarus) ~250,000; across the country: ~500,000 | 16 August: Minsk: ~5,000–65,000; Total: ~100,000 police and soldiers |

Casualties and losses
| 1,373 injured 4–11 dead 30,000+ arrested 6+ missing | 121 injured |
- At least a few journalists wounded

Casualties
- Arrested: 220 (June); 700 (July)
- Fined: 107

The 2020–2021 Belarusian protests were a series of mass political demonstrations and protests against the Belarusian government and President Alexander Lukashenko. The largest anti-government protests in the history of Belarus, the demonstrations began in the lead-up to and during the 2020 presidential election, in which Lukashenko sought his sixth term in office. In response to the demonstrations, a number of relatively small pro-government rallies were held.

The protests intensified nationwide after the official election results were announced on the night of 9 August, in which Lukashenko was declared the winner. Sviatlana Tsikhanouskaya, the main opponent of Lukashenko, rejected the results as falsified and claimed instead to have received 60–70% of the votes. On 14 August, she announced the creation of the Coordination Council, with membership applications open to all Belarusians who agreed that the official election had been falsified.

On 23 September, Belarusian state media announced that Lukashenko had been inaugurated for another five-year term in a brief ceremony which was held privately. The following day, the EU published a statement that rejected the legitimacy of the election, called for new elections, and condemned the repression and violence against the protesters.

The protesters faced violent persecution by the authorities. A statement by the United Nations Human Rights Office on 1 September cited more than 450 documented cases of torture and ill-treatment of detainees, as well as reports of sexual abuse and rape. At the end of 2020, the Viasna Human Rights Centre documented 1,000 testimonies of torture victims.

== Background ==
Alexander Lukashenko has been the head of state of Belarus since 1994, and did not have a serious challenger in the previous five elections, resulting in being referred to as "Europe's last dictator" by media outlets. Under his authoritarian rule, the government has frequently repressed the opposition.

Lukashenko had faced greater public opposition amid his handling of the COVID-19 pandemic, which Lukashenko had denied as a serious threat. Of the five elections won by Lukashenko, only the first one in 1994 was credibly deemed free and fair by international monitors.

== Before the election ==
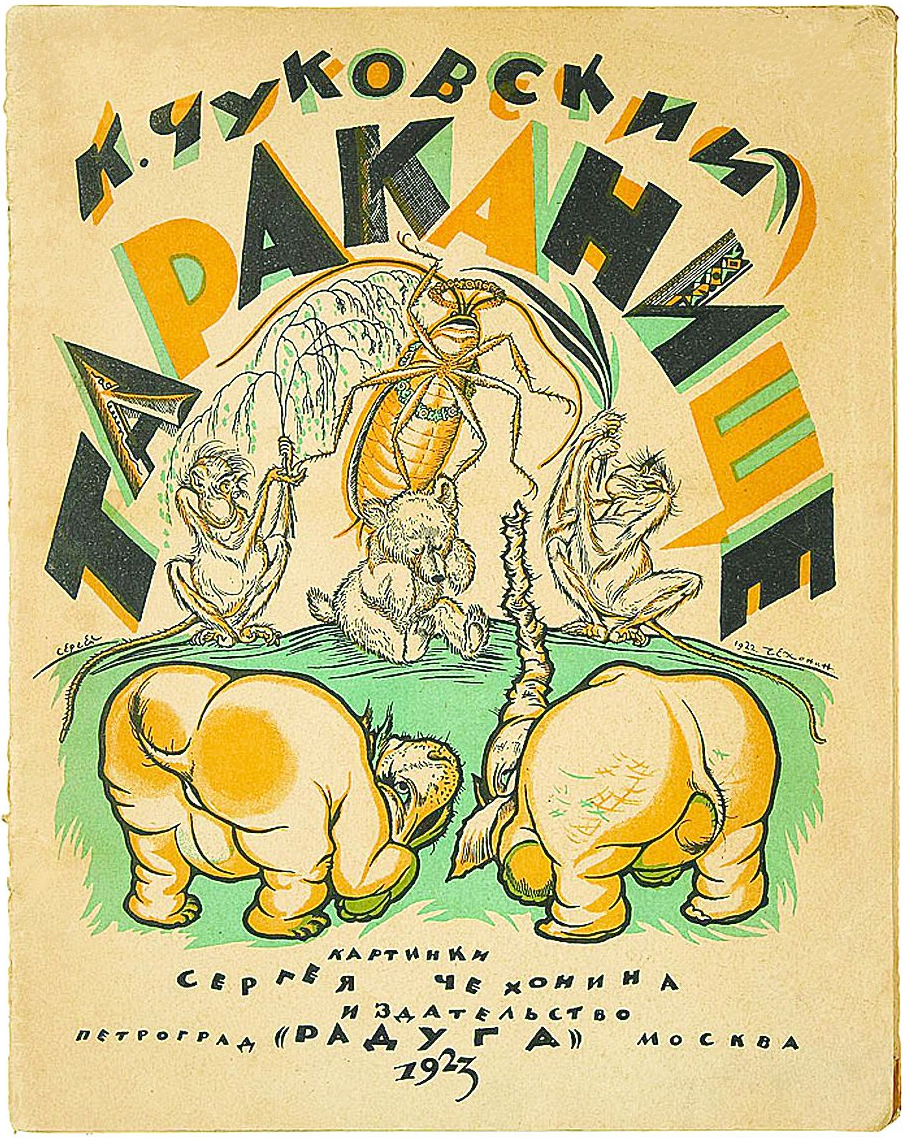
The nickname "cockroach" for Lukashenko was adopted from Korney Chukovsky's 1921 children's poem Tarakanishche (The Monster Cockroach).

The protests, nicknamed the Slipper Revolution and the Anti-Cockroach Revolution, were initiated by businessman and blogger Sergei Tikhanovsky when he made a reference to the children's poem The Monster Cockroach (Russian: Тараканище, romanized: Tarakanishche) by Korney Chukovsky.

The original story, published in 1923, concerns a dictatorial yet fragile insect and his brief, chaotic reign of terror over all the other animals. It has been compared to The Emperor's New Clothes. In his reference, Tikhanovsky compared Lukashenko to the cockroach in the story. In the original poem, the cockroach is eventually eaten by a sparrow; Tikhanovsky refers to a slipper signifying stamping on the cockroach.

Tikhanovsky travelled across Belarus and streamed interviews with random people on his YouTube channel Country for life (Russian: Страна для жизни, romanized: Strana dlya zhizni). Most of his respondents expressed disagreement with Lukashenko and the current government.

Tikhanovsky was detained in late May 2020 by Belarusian authorities, and was formally accused of being a foreign agent. In June 2020, street protests against Lukashenko took place. Several opposition candidates were registered for the 2020 Belarusian presidential election, but many of them were arrested.

During an interview, Lukashenko claimed that the opposition protests were a part of a plot orchestrated by foreigners, whom he suggested might be Americans, NATO members, Russians, or even Ukrainians. On 19 June, Lukashenko announced that he had "foiled a coup attempt", resulting in the arrest of main opposition rival Viktar Babaryka. According to CNN, Babaryka stated that the charges of bribery and corruption were falsified and the arrest was politically motivated to stop him from winning the presidential election.

When Babaryka was detained by authorities, people began walking in the streets to show their disapproval. Opposition activists, protesters, journalists, and bloggers were arrested as part of the crackdown. The human rights group Viasna estimated that around 1,300 people had been detained for protesting between early May and early August.

Tikhanovsky's wife Sviatlana Tsikhanouskaya registered as a candidate in the election after the arrest of Babaryka. Lukashenko insisted the country was not ready for a woman to become president. Unregistered candidate Valery Tsepkalo's wife Veronika Tsepkalo announced that she and Maria Kalesnikava, head of Babaryka's presidential campaign staff, would join Sviatlana Tsikhanouskaya's campaign and provide support.

The protests led to questions of how long the crisis may last, and whether it would escalate into violence, possibly evolving into a full revolution, akin to how the Euromaidan protests turned into a revolution in Ukraine in 2014. The German Marshall Fund, a US think tank, noted that the protests were more widespread, and more brutally repressed than previous protests in Belarus.

The Organization for Security and Co-operation in Europe (OSCE) reported that it would not be monitoring the 2020 election as it wasn't invited to do so. This was the first time since 2001 that the OSCE's Office for Democratic Institutions and Human Rights (ODIHR) did not monitor elections in Belarus. The OSCE has not recognized any elections in Belarus as free and fair since 1995, and the government has obstructed past OSCE election-monitoring missions in the country.

=== May protests ===
On 24 May, hundreds protested against president Alexander Lukashenko and his decision to run for the 2020 Belarusian presidential election. Anti-government protesters held slippers as a sign of protest against the regime. Rallies and demonstrations continued strongly throughout May and June. On 27 May, protesters marched throughout the country and clashed with police. Slippers were pelted at the police and chants such as "You Cockroach" and "Resign you Rat" were heard. Elderly women and men protested daily until the elections. Balaclava-wearing police were then seen arresting popular YouTuber Sergei Tikhanovsky.

=== Presidential campaign ===
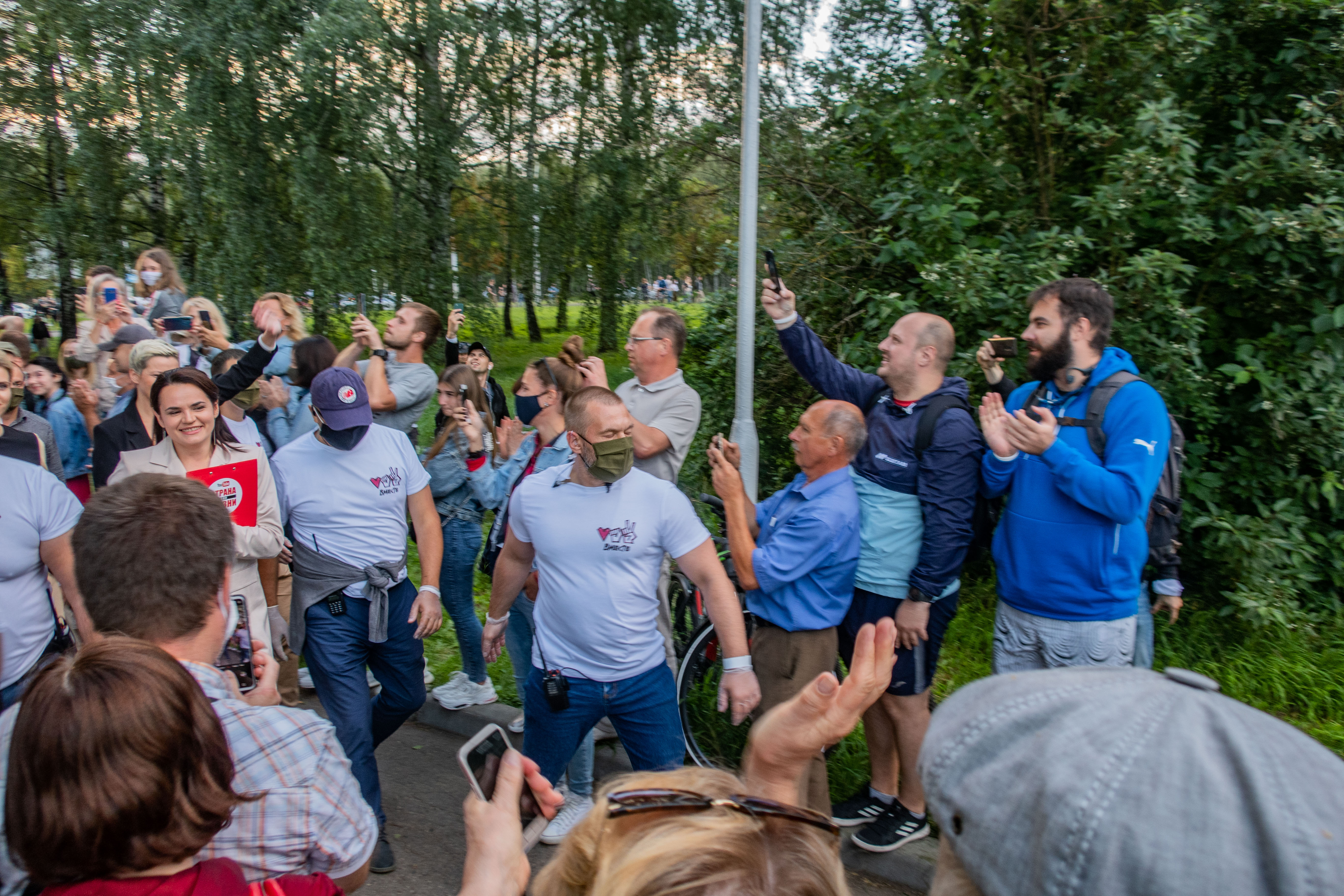
Opposition candidate Sviatlana Tsikhanouskaya (left) alongside a crowd of supporters in Minsk on 30 July

Rather than relying on experienced politicians, the joint campaign of Sviatlana Tsikhanouskaya, Maria Kalesnikava, and Veronika Tsepkalo largely mobilized what research describes as “venture opposition”. The members of the headquarters consisted of entrepreneurs and professionals from the media, marketing, and tech sectors, who introduced novel campaigning methods.

On 30 July, a permitted rally of presidential candidate Sviatlana Tsikhanouskaya took place in the Friendship of Peoples Park in Minsk. According to human rights activists, 63,000–70,000 people gathered, but a statement from the Belarusian Interior Ministry alleged that only 18,250 people had been recorded passing through the metal-detecting checkpoints set up at the event.

On 6 August an estimated 5,000 peaceful protesters took to the streets in Minsk, waving white ribbons, calling for free and fair elections.

=== Wagnergate ===
On 29 July, 33 mercenaries from the Wagner Group, a Russian private military company, were arrested in a sanatorium near Minsk. Members of the group were allegedly lured to Minsk as part of a Ukrainian intelligence operation.

Belarusian authorities claimed that Tikhanovsky was working with Russians to destabilize Belarus. All but one of the mercenaries, who was a Belarusian national and remained in custody, were deported to Russia on 14 August despite a request from Ukraine for their extradition.

== Election day ==
External videos
- Anthem used by protestors Pahonia
- "Mury" song -one of the songs of Belarusian protest

Protests during election night

On 9 August, all roads and entry points to Minsk were blocked by the police and army early in the morning.

In the middle of the day, the Internet in Belarus was partially blocked. Government officials claimed that the reason was a heavy denial-of-service attack originating from outside Belarus. However, independent IT specialists claimed that the Belarusian state Internet monopoly Beltelecom and affiliated state agencies deliberately used deep packet inspection (DPI) technology or traffic shaping, and that issues with the filtering equipment used may have been the cause. Telegram was the only working instant messaging application.

In the evening of the election day immediately after the close of polling stations, the Belarusian government-sponsored TV aired exit poll results showing a supposed landslide with Lukashenko receiving 80.23% of the votes, and Tsikhanouskaya receiving 9.9%. The landslide was so great that even pro-government parts of the Belarusian population found that it was unlikely to be true. This caused an immediate reaction by supporters of Tsikhanouskaya to head to the streets in all major cities in Belarus, such as Brest, Minsk, Viciebsk, Hrodna, Mazyr, Pinsk, Homel, and Babruisk. Protesters were expressing their dissatisfaction and were calling for a fair count of votes. Protests started as peaceful in the middle of the night, but in Minsk, the situation escalated into violence between protesters and authorities. Protesters started building barricades to block traffic on the streets. The number of protesters in Minsk could not be measured as they were not concentrated in a single spot.

At night, after breaking up big crowds, police officers chased smaller groups of protesters through downtown Minsk for several hours. A fight against security forces and police continued in the major cities of Belarus. Law enforcement officers used police batons, rubber bullets (fired from shotguns), grenades with lead balls, water cannons, tear gas, and stun grenades. They used them to suppress the protests as people were chased in the suburbs all night. In Brest, protesters gradually dispersed, leaving a crowd of 200–300 from an estimated previous total of 5,000. That night in Minsk, security forces dropped grenades near people, leaving some with critical injuries.

People were reported to be arrested while waiting for the election results near their polling stations. In Minsk, a 73-year-old man with a daughter and grandchildren were arrested with nearly 20 other people who gathered near the 86th school after the closure of the polling station. It was reported that they were sentenced to 10 and 25 days in jail. In Baranavichy, two Roman Catholic priests were arrested among others; they were waiting for the results near their polling station.

== Coordination Council and National Anti-Crisis Management ==
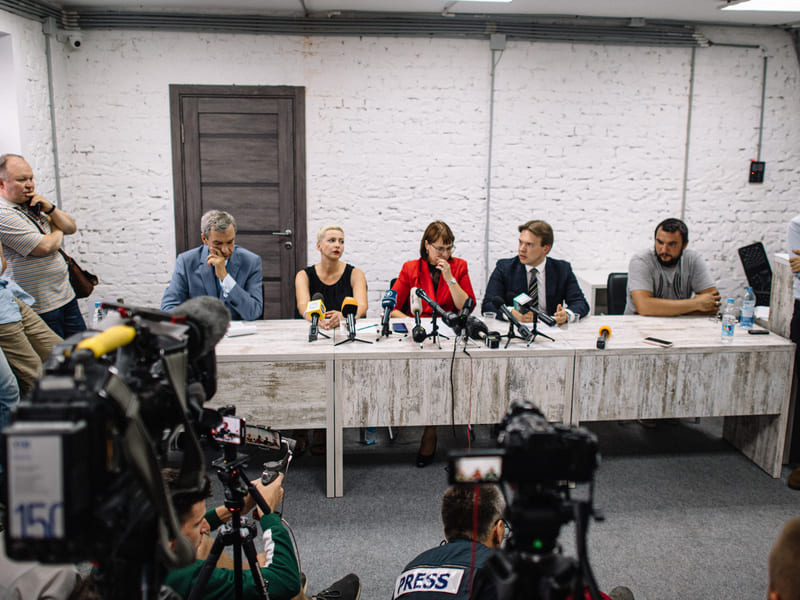
First press conference of the Coordination Council on 18 August 2020

On 14 August 2020, in a video in which Tsikhanouskaya claimed that she had received 60–70% of the vote, she announced the creation of the Coordination Council for the Transfer of Power.

Tsikhanouskaya stated that the council should be made of "civil society activists, respected Belarusians and professionals" to handle the transfer of power from Lukashenko. Applications for membership of the transitional council were open to any Belarusian citizen who recognised the election as having been falsified, and who was in a position of social trust such as a doctor, a teacher, a business leader, an author, or a sportsperson.

On 17 August 2020, Tsikhanouskaya released a video in which she stated that she was ready to lead a transitional government and to organise a new, free, and fair presidential election. A list of members was circulated on 17 August 2020 and included Nobel Prize laureate Svetlana Alexievich. The first meeting of the Council took place on 18 August 2020 and its leadership was elected the following day.

Lukashenko decried the creation of the council as an 'attempt to seize power' and promised "appropriate measures". On 20 August 2020, the chief prosecutor launched a criminal case against the council, calling it unconstitutional.

United States Secretary of State, Mike Pompeo, in a statement urged the Belarusian government to actively engage Belarusian society, including through the newly established Coordination Council, "in a way that reflects what the Belarusian people are demanding, for the sake of Belarus' future, and for a successful Belarus."

Dmitry Peskov, spokesperson for Russian President Vladimir Putin welcomed the fact that the leadership of the Coordination Council did not want to reduce their ties with Russia and instead hoped to continue with good bilateral relationships between the two countries.

On 17 September 2020, the European Parliament recognized the coordination council as the "interim representation of the people" of Belarus.

In late October 2020, the Coordination Council created a shadow government, called National Anti-Crisis Management (NAM), for organising the detailed administrative tasks for a peaceful transfer of power to a fairly and freely elected president. NAM is led by Pavel Latushko and states that it will lose its powers when a new president is inaugurated. In November 2020, NAM published internal reports from the Belarusian Ministry of Internal Affairs showing that 4000 complaints for torture and other illegal actions by security forces had been submitted between 9 August 2020 and 9 November 2020, but all had been ignored by the ministry.

== Deaths ==
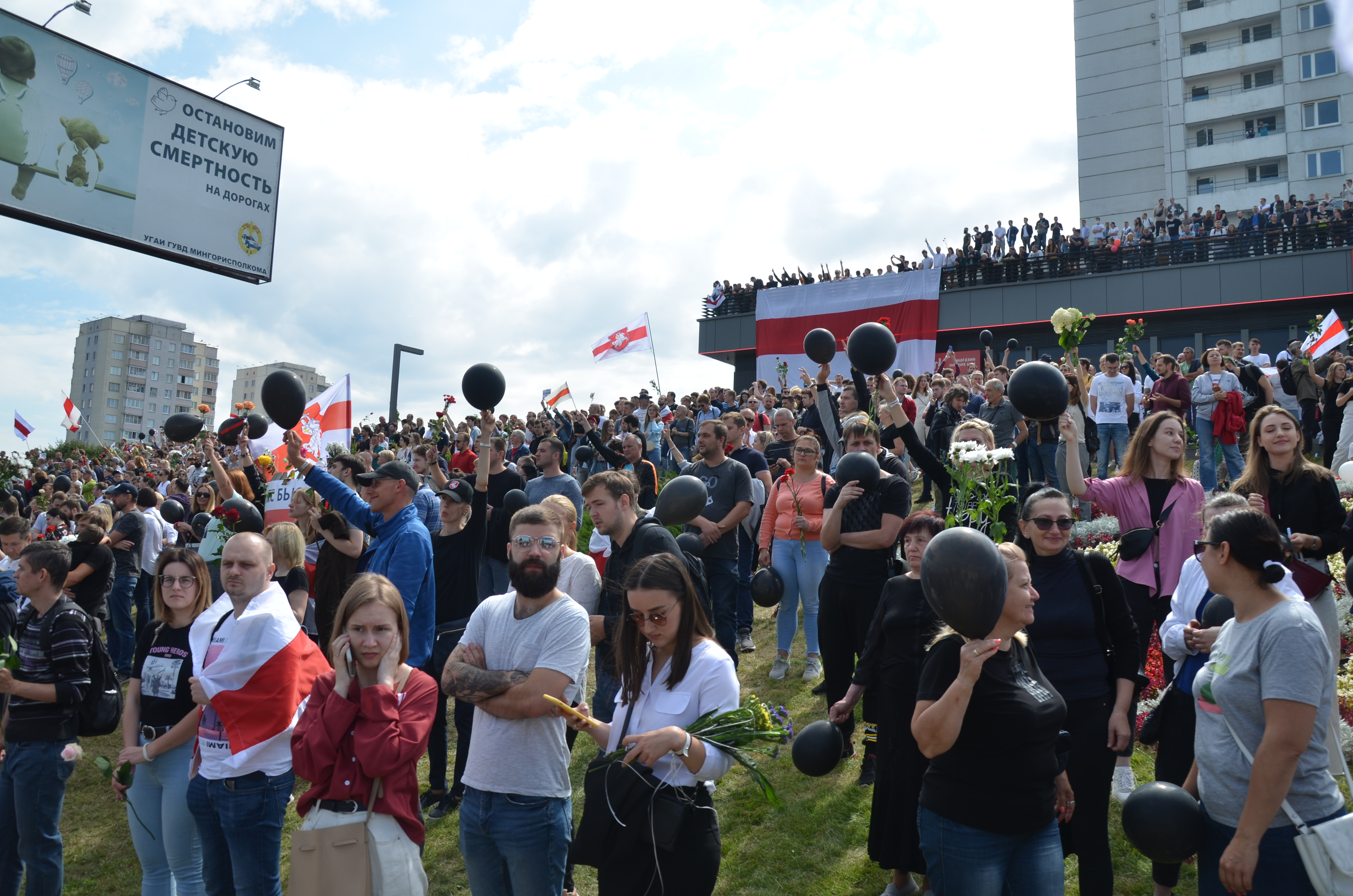
Rally in memory of Alexander Taraikovsky on 15 August

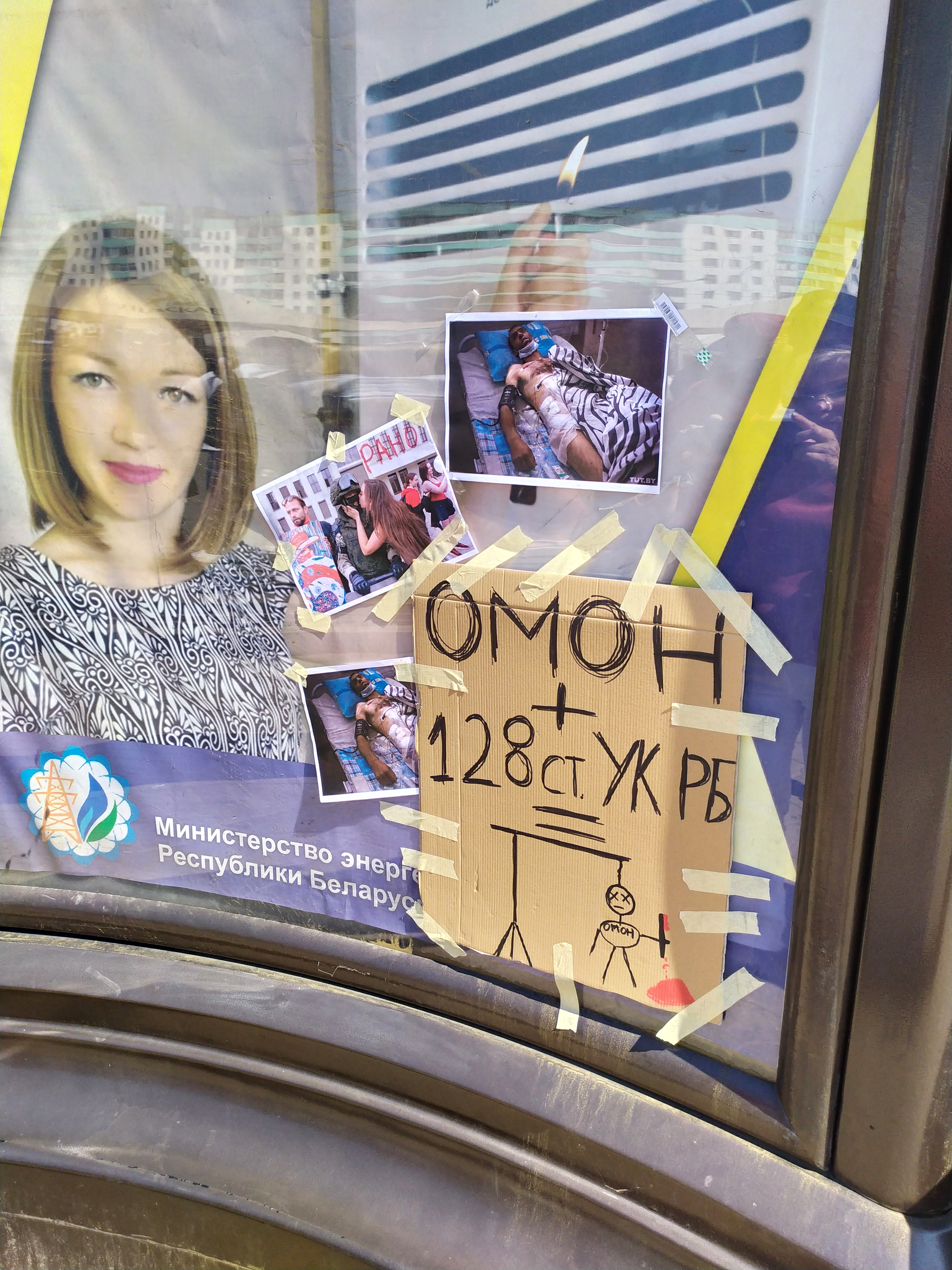
Makeshift board with photographs and a drawing to represent a dead OMON officer on a gallows, holding a bloody stick.

On 10 August, a protester, Alexander Taraikovsky, died near Pushkinskaya metro station. According to the Ministry of Internal Affairs, the protester tried to throw an explosive device at the government troopers and it exploded in his arms. However, some doubts in the circumstances of the death of the 34-year-old man were expressed. It was reported that a massive blood loss due to an open chest wound was recorded in a death certificate. A video was published on 15 August that showed the empty-handed protester being shot at by police. On 15 August, the Associated Press published a single frame from a video made on 10 August. It showed a man in a white shirt that looked similar to Taraikovsky and that was staggering unsteadily with a big red spot on his chest. No further commentary from the Ministry of Internal Affairs followed, however, according to the Belarusian Investigative Committee, as of 15 August 2020, the circumstances of the Taraikovsky's death were under investigation. Elena German, the wife of Taraikovsky, saw the body in the morgue and reported that there were no injuries to his hands, but there was a small hole in his chest, consistent with a bullet hole. On 15 August, thousands of people gathered at the funeral in Minsk.

On 12 August, 25-year-old Alexander Vikhor died in Homel. He is believed to have had a heart-related disease. According to preliminary information, he died due to waiting in a security forces detainee van for several hours in hot weather. He was in the van because the city's temporary detention centres were overcrowded. Vikhor was sentenced to 10 days in prison, but it was reported that he didn't receive proper medical attention in time.

Also on or around 12 August, 28-year-old Nikita Krivtsov went missing. His body was found on 22 August near Minsk. Krivtsov was a fan of FC Maladzyechna, whose home ground is in the city of Maladzyechna. On 9 August, the day of the election, there was a peaceful protest in Maladzyechna against the official election result. Photographs show Krivtsov at the front of the protest, carrying a white-red-white flag, confronting a line of police. A friend stated that Krivtsov phoned him on 10 August, stating that he was in Minsk and had nearly been arrested by riot police. The friend said Krivtsov phoned him again on 11 August saying that he spent much of the day in a bar. On 12 August, the friend tried phoning Krivtsov but got no answer, which he said was out of character. Another report suggests that on 12 August, Krivtsov was in the city of Zhodzina, where his estranged wife lives with their five-year-old daughter, and that he left Zhodzina to go to the village of Karaliou Stan, where he worked, but he never arrived. On 22 August a watchman found Krivtsov's body in a forest near Minsk. The body was hanging by the neck, but its feet were on the ground. The condition of the body suggested that Krivtsov had been dead for about a week. Police claim that Krivtsov committed suicide, but his family stated that they didn't believe them.

On 15 August, 29-year-old Kanstantsin Shyshmakou, director of the Bagration Military History Museum in Vaukavysk, disappeared. As a member of the election commission, he refused to sign the protocols, called his wife at about 5 pm and said: "I will not work here anymore, I am going home." Shishmakov was later found dead in a river. This was announced by the search and rescue squad "Angel".

On 17 August, the human rights advocates from the Belarusian education and social association "Zvyano" ("Link") issued a report, which said that at least five people had been murdered during the protests, and seven people were in critical medical condition.

On 19 August, 43-year-old Hienadz Shutau died in the Minsk military hospital after he had received gunshot wounds in the head during the 11 August protests in Brest. It was reported that the shot may have been fired by the police. MediaZona later released footage from a security camera, showing the official version a lie, and Shutau in effect being murdered from behind without warning.

On 3 October, Denis Kuznetsov, a 41-year-old male who was detained on 29 September, died in an intensive care unit after being transported there from Akrestsina. According to Kuznetsov's relatives and his medical history, during transportation to the hospital, he informed the medics that he was beaten by the Akrestsina staff, who, in turn, claimed that Kuznetsov "fell from the top of a bunk bed". The Kuznetsov's clinical diagnosis, among other things, included moderate traumatic brain injury, numerous hematomas, basilar skull fracture, subarachnoid hemorrhage, and fractures of 11 right ribs. In a further comment by the Belarusian Ministry of Internal Affairs, it was reported that results of the preliminary investigation supported the version presented by the Akrestsina staff.

On 11 November, Raman Bandarenka, a 31-year-old Minsk resident, a manager and an art-designer, was attacked and kidnapped from his yard in The Square of Changes. After some time, an ambulance was called to the Central District Department of Internal Affairs, which found Bandarenka unconscious. He was admitted to the intensive care unit of the Minsk BHMP (Minsk City Emergency Hospital) on 12 November 2020 at 00:05, where he was diagnosed with a severe closed traumatic brain injury, the acute subdural hematomas of the head, cerebral hemorrhage, and multiple soft tissue injuries. He was in a coma and underwent surgery, but medics were unable to save Bandarenka due to his serious condition. Bandarenka died on the evening of 12 November 2020.

The authorities and leaders of the Ministry of Internal Affairs never claimed that people died at the hands of police representatives.

== Human rights issues ==
According to numerous publications, the suppression of the 2020 Belarusian protests was accompanied by extreme police violence, and systematic violation of human rights throughout stages of the detention process.

On 14 August, the World Organisation Against Torture (OMCT) issued a statement that condemned the arbitrary detainment and torture of protesters across Belarus following the election. According to the statement, such actions suggested crimes against humanity. The statement also called for an unbiased worldwide investigation into the "systematic and extremely violent oppression" of peaceful protests in Belarus.

On 19 August, the classification of these events as crimes against humanity, in accordance with the Rome Statute of the International Criminal Court, was supported in a Human Rights Foundation (HRF) statement. According to the statement, HRF identified fifteen persons from the Belarusian state apparatus who were responsible for the arbitrary detention, beating, and torture of thousands of peaceful protesters. Letters informing these persons of imminent criminal prosecution for crimes against humanity were sent to each of them on 17 August.

On 17 August, the human rights advocates from the Belarusian education and social association "Zvyano" ("Link") issued the "Report on the violation of human rights of the participants in the protests in Belarus from 7 to 14 August 2020", based on interviews with 30 victims of the police abuse, as well as on interviews with doctors of several Minsk hospitals. Some of the cases were supported by audio or video evidence. On that same day, a statement to the Prosecutor General's Office of Belarus with request to perform an investigation of the police' actions on the basis of 16 articles of Criminal Code of Belarus, including murder, torture, and rape, was issued by Viktar Babaryka's electoral campaign manager, Maria Kalesnikava.

The numerous human rights violations were corroborated and condemned by a number of former or current Belarusian police officers, such as Sergei Mikhasev, former employee of the Viciebsk police department, who was detained along with other protesters and spent several days in a detention centre, and Yuri Makhnach, a police officer from Lida, who stated that the authorities had prepared them for a war against their own people.

In a 20 August statement by the United States Secretary of State, Mike Pompeo underlined that the USA supported international efforts to look independently into Belarus' electoral irregularities, the human rights abuses that surrounded the election, and the crackdown that had followed.

In a 21 August statement by the UN High Commissioner for Human Rights, it was noted that, despite the majority of the detainees being released, serious concerns remained about the eight missing protesters and the sixty accused of serious criminal acts. The statement underlined the lack of information about the detainees' status and called for the government to stop unlawfully detaining people. The Commissioner also confirmed that there were four deaths and was greatly concerned about the allegations of large-scale torture and ill-treatment of people, including journalists and children.

On 1 September, in a statement by the UN human rights experts, more than 450 documented cases of torture and ill-treatment of detainees were mentioned, including sexual abuse and rape with rubber batons of men, women, and children.

The Ministry of Internal Affairs of Belarus rejected allegations of abuse and torture of citizens detained during the protests. However, the beatings of the detainees, including at Akrestsina, were recognized by Alexander Lukashenko himself.

On 26 October, Anais Marin, the UN human rights investigator, called on the Belarus government to "stop repressing its own people". Around 20,000 people were detained in August and September, while hundreds have been reportedly beaten, intimidated, tortured, or ill-treated in custody, according to the sources described by Anais Marin. Belarus has witnessed large-scale demonstrations against President Alexander Lukashenko's re-election to a sixth term in the August 9 voting, which the opposition argues was rigged.

On 3 November 2020, UN experts criticized Belarus government for targeting women human rights defenders, during the mass protests. Three women human rights defenders were detained and persecuted by the authorities for their work as rights activists in September and early October.

On 6 November 2020, the Organization for Security and Co-operation in Europe revealed in a letter about the human rights violations and cases of torture in Belarus, following the elections, where security forces used excessive violence against protesters. The report also stated to hold new presidential elections and initiated an investigation into allegations of torture.

On 15 November 2020, the UN human rights office said the government of Belarus continued to commit human rights violations with impunity against peaceful protesters three months after the country's disputed presidential elections. The UN claimed that the government had responded to these peaceful demonstrations in a heavy-handed manner, with the use of unnecessary or excessive force by law enforcement officials.

On 22 November, more than 200 people were detained in Minsk.

== Attacks on journalists and censorship ==
During the 2020 Belarusian presidential election, reports of attacks increased. On 23 July, Lukashenko stated during a meeting with the leaders of the country's economic bloc, that his main concern was that the BBC and Radio Free Europe/Radio Liberty had encouraged riots while streaming protests. Lukashenko also threatened to expel media and ban them from reporting on the election.

On 9–11 August, several independent journalists were arrested in Minsk, Brest, and Babruisk. According to a statement by the Belarusian Association of Journalists, on 10 August, internal troops and other government forces deliberately shot rubber bullets at independent journalists in Minsk (including TUT.BY and Nasha Niva). The journalists wore special high visibility jackets and had personal IDs. Nasha Niva editor-in-chief (also wearing a jacket) disappeared during the night. He managed to send an SOS SMS message to his wife, saying he was arrested. His fate was unknown as of 13:30 local time, and the Nasha Niva website was not updated for several hours after his presumed arrest. Several journalists, including foreigners, were slightly injured during the suppression of the protests. A rubber bullet hit the plastic ID of Getty Images' photojournalist Michal Fridman. Several Russian journalists from both official media and Internet projects were arrested but released soon after.

On 10 August, local journalists reported problems with all major communication platforms and pro-opposition websites.

On 11 August, it was reported that police officers and other government agents forcibly took away memory cards from journalists' devices. They also forced them to delete photos or crushed their cameras. BBC News Russia reported that three of its journalists were beaten by the government forces that night while covering the protests. Russian journalist Nikita Telizhenko was heavily beaten in Belarusian jail: he was arrested in Minsk and sent to Zhodzina because of jails' overcrowding in Minsk. In Zhodzina he was beaten on his kidneys, legs, and neck, but he was soon released at the Russian embassy's request. Arrested Russian journalist Artyom Vazhenkov was reported to be accused of mass rioting (punishable by up to 15 years of prison in Belarus).

On 12 August, Belsat journalist Jauhien Merkis was arrested in Homel while covering the protests. Even though he was there as a journalist, the next day, the local court sentenced him to 15 days in jail for "participation in an unauthorized mass event". He was released soon after, but on 21 August he was arrested again and was given 5 days in jail. Journalist Ruslan Kulevich from Hrodna, arrested on 11 August, was freed on 14 August with fractures of both hands.

One of the few communication systems that managed to avoid censorship was the independent Belarusian-owned Nexta Telegram channel based in Warsaw. The channel's subscribers rose from 100,000 on election night to over a million after a day. The channel published user-generated videos, photos, and comments of the protests. The founder of Nexta himself faced up to 15 years of prison after being indicted by the regime. The use of Telegram software provided the protesters with communication channels to share information and coordinate protest action. Its sister channel Nexta TV has more than 700,000 followers. Belarus of the Brain's had over 470,000 followers. Officials opened a criminal probe into Stsiapan Putsila, founder of Nexta, on charges of fomenting mass riots. Ihar Losik, founder of the Telegram channel "Republic of Belarus of the Brain", was arrested before the election, but the channel also continued to operate.

On 15 August, a meeting was held with the head of the upper chamber of Parliament of Belarus Natalia Kochanova and press Secretary of the President of Belarus Natalia Eismont. The audience, the workers at the Belarusian TV and radio company in Minsk, asked why the station was not broadcasting the truth. The officials had been escorted to the building by riot police who took control of the building. Thousands of protesters outside demanded the station show people the truth. It was also reported that some staff had resigned and one hundred were planning to strike on Monday.

It was reported that on 18 June, reporters from various countries, arriving in Minsk airport, were pulled out of passport control, interrogated and locked up before being refused entry and being told to buy a plane ticket to some other country, in an attempt to suppress the media.

On 21 August 72 to 73 websites were blocked in Belarus, including several independent news portals (Radio Liberty/Free Europe in Belarus svaboda.org, by.tribuna.com sport news, euroradio.fm (European Radio for Belarus), Belsat.eu (Belsat TV), gazetaby.com, the-village.me/news and others), electoral sites of Tsepkalo and Babaryka, "Golos" and "Zubr" platforms, spring96.org human rights portal, and several VPN services.

As of 21 August, the Belarusian edition of Komsomolskaya Pravda newspaper failed to print three editions, and Narodnaja Volya failed to print a newspaper edition (both newspapers had a contract with the government-controlled printing house). The Belarusian Association of Journalists stated that the real cause was not technical troubles, but an attempt to block information about the protests and violations of human rights. Two other independent newspapers (BelGazeta and Svobodnye Novosti) also were unable to print new editions in Belarus. New editions of Komsomolskaya Pravda and Narodnaja Volya were printed in Russia, but the state network of newsstands "Belsoyuzpechat'" denied to take them for sale. These newspapers also reported that the post service delayed the delivery by subscription.

On 27 August, around 20 journalists, from both local and international media, were detained on Freedom Square in Minsk. The journalists were taken to the Kastrychnitski district police supposedly to check their identity and accreditation.

On 29 August, accreditation of several foreign journalists was revoked; they worked for Radio Free Europe/Radio Liberty, Associated Press, Reuters, AFP, BBC, ARD, Radio France Internationale, Deutsche Welle and Current Time TV. It was reported that some of them (including Paul Hansen) were deported from Belarus. Independent news web sites naviny.by and nn.by (Nasha Niva) were blocked in Belarus.

On 1 September, 6 Belarusian journalists who covered the protest march of students in Minsk were detained. Initially they were taken to the police office to check the documents, but they were later charged with "participation in an unauthorized mass event" and coordination of the protests.

Starting 5 October, only state-approved and sponsored media were allowed to act as journalists in Belarus. This was achieved through journalist licenses, which was first announced on 2 October after TUT.BY, and several other news organizations were stripped of their journalist mandates. The licenses were strictly issued by the Belarusian government and forbid all medias from chronicling protests, demonstrations and other material deemed as "anti-governmental" by the state.

Photographers working for the Russian state-owned agencies Komsomolskaya Pravda and TASS were detained on 12 October during the second seniors' march.

On 12 November, anarchist activist and journalist Mikola Dziadok was arrested in a safe house in Asipovichy District. His Telegram channel was captured by the police. He was beaten during the arrest. The "Anarchist Black Cross" claimed that he was tortured to give access to his computer data.

On 19 November, NEXTA founder Stsiapan Putsila and former chief-editor Roman Protasevich were added to the terrorism list by the Belarusian KGB. The list included 726 persons, Putsila and Protasevich were the only Belarusian citizens on it.

On 3 December, a court in Minsk stripped TUT.BY of its media license over allegedly spreading "false information."

On 23 May 2021, Belarusian authorities ordered Ryanair Flight 4978, a passenger plane flying from Greece to Lithuania, to land while over Belarusian airspace, and sent a fighter jet to intercept the plane and escort it to Minsk. While there police entered the plane and arrested Roman Protasevich, a Belarusian journalist who had been critical of Lukashenko's government; the plane was then allowed to leave. The action prompted widespread condemnation and sanctions from various European countries.

On 1 June, Belarusian prisoner Stepan Latypov, detained in a crackdown on protests, attempted to cut his own throat with a pen during a court hearing after telling his family that he had been held in a torture cell for 51 days and being informed by police that his relatives and neighbours would be prosecuted under criminal law if he did not confess.

== Persecution on religious grounds ==
The Christian Vision working group of the Coordination Council reported that during the election campaign and during the protests in 2020, a number of employees of religious organisations were dismissed or forced to resign because of their political beliefs. A number of pastors and priests were detained, sentenced to arrest or fined, received formal warnings from law-enforcing agencies or lost a permission for pastoral activity in Belarus for participating in protests, their public support, or being close to protest sites. Orthodox priest Vladimir Drobyshevsky and his family, the family of Old Believers German and Natalia Snezhkov and Roman Catholic priest Dzmitry Prystupa left Belarus escaping persecution. The Investigative Committee submitted the content of Roman Catholic priest Viachaslau Barok's video blog for examination on suspicion of extremism. The Belarusian Orthodox Church and two Greek Catholic parishes received formal warnings of violating the law, which, in case of repeated violations, could have been used by courts to close these religious organisations down. The head of the Belarusian Orthodox Church, Metropolitan Pavel (Ponomarev), resigned as Patriarchal Exarch of All Belarus; he admitted that the change of Exarch was due to the political situation. Roman Catholic Archbishop Tadeusz Kondrusiewicz was refused re-entry to the country and lived in exile for four months. The broadcast of Sunday's Roman Catholic Mass was cancelled by the national radiostation. Peacefully protesting or just praying lay believers were detained and arrested on various grounds. Some were tortured. The right of arrested believers to have objects of worship and to use religious literature in pre-trial detention and penitentiary institutions has been repeatedly violated.

On August 22, 2020, Alexander Lukashenko called on religious communities to not support the protests, shamed them for their participation in protests, and warned that "the state will not look at it with indifference."

== Economic impact ==
One of the industries most affected by the government's reactions to protests was the Belarusian IT industry.

Multiple IT companies operating in Belarus began moving their employees and operations outside of the country due to internet shutdowns, namely in Minsk. The intermittent cut-offs, starting in August 2020, were said to have caused major difficulties in the IT industry. A survey conducted by Belarus IT CEO Club shortly after the presidential elections in 2020, in conjunction with RegisConsult, surveyed 270 owners and managers of IT companies in Belarus. 38% of the participants stated that their companies were exploring options for changing their offices' location. 11% of participants said that their companies had already left or were in the process of transferring part of their workforce outside of the country; 3% of the surveyed stated that their companies had left Belarus completely or were in the process of relocating all employees.

Global success story World of Tanks relocated employees from Belarus to Vilnius, Kyiv and other countries. However the company did not take a public stance against the government's actions, possibly out of fear that its employees could be detained as hostages.

Software developer SoftSwiss transferred more than 100 employees to Ukraine in August 2020, claiming it was unable to continue to provide its services otherwise. The company stated they were planning a permanent move outside of Belarus by the end of 2021, stating their reasons are linked to the volatile situation in the country.

Global game developer, Gismart, was also affected. While Gismart is headquartered in the United Kingdom, it employed dozens of people in Belarus. Similar to SoftSwiss, in August 2020, Gismart began to move its Belarus-based employees out of the country. The company launched a relocation program in response to the growing number of requests from employees concerned about the unrest in Belarus. The company said that these employees' work would not have been possible without a stable internet connection.

== International reactions ==
International reactions to Lukashenko's re-election Belarus Congratulated Lukashenko Recognised Tsikhanouskaya as winner Not recognised result Expressed criticism over conflict escalation No reaction

Countries and organisations voiced their opinions with some accepting and rejecting the election result. Many have commented about the protests with more condemning the violence. Some have done the following actions in relation with Belarus.

=== International sanctions ===
- On 14 August, EU High Representative for Foreign Affairs and Security Policy Josep Borrell announced that the EU would bring in sanctions against Belarusian officials responsible for "violence and falsification". Charles Michel, President of the European Council went further on 19 August saying the EU would soon impose sanctions on a "substantial number" of individuals responsible for violence, repression, and election fraud. The European Commission announced it would divert €53 million earmarked for Belarus away from the government and towards civil society, victims of the state crackdown on protesters and the country's fight against the coronavirus pandemic.
- On 18 August, the Lithuanian parliament agreed to impose economic sanctions.
- On 19 August, the prime minister of Slovakia stated that the Government of Slovakia introduced sanctions against Belarus in the new legislative session.
- On 31 August, Estonia, Latvia and Lithuania imposed sanctions on 30 Belarusian officials, including Alexander Lukashenko.
- On 10 September, the EU sanctions on Belarus were delayed by a separate dispute between Cyprus and Turkey, which has occupied the northern part of Cyprus since July 1974. Greece and Cyprus were pushing for a sanction on Turkey in a dispute in the Eastern Mediterranean.
- On 25 September, Estonia, Latvia and Lithuania imposed sanctions on around a hundred Belarus officials.
- On 29 September, personal sanctions against members of the regime, including Alexander and Viktor Lukashenko, were imposed by the UK and Canada. 8 and 11 individuals were affected, respectively. The sanctions included travel bans and asset freezes.
- On 2 October, the EU imposed sanctions on 40 Belarusian officials. Lukashenko was exempted from the sanctions as the EU aims to encourage Lukashenko to engage in talks with the opposition. Hours later, Belarus retaliated with sanctions against EU officials. On the same day, the US imposed sanctions on 8 Belarusian individuals.
- On 13 October, Switzerland joined the EU sanctions against 40 Belarusian individuals.
- On 15 October, Canada imposed sanctions on 31 additional Belarusian individuals.
- On 6 November, the EU imposed sanctions on Alexander Lukashenko and 14 other officials for repression of the pro-democracy movement following August's contested election. Their assets in EU member states were frozen and they are banned from entering EU territory. On the same day, Canada imposed sanctions on 13 Belarusian individuals.
- On 19 November, the EU announced an upcoming list of sanctions targeting the country's firms and entrepreneurs that finance Lukashenko. According to Borrell, up to date no positive signs were seen from the regime and the new measures will increase economic pressure on the self-proclaimed president.
- On 20 November, Iceland, Liechtenstein, Norway, North Macedonia, Montenegro, Albania and Ukraine aligned themselves with the October EU sanctions against 40 Belarusian individuals. Separately on the same day, Estonia, Latvia and Lithuania imposed sanctions on 28 Belarusian individuals.
- On 24 November, Iceland, Liechtenstein, Norway, North Macedonia, Montenegro and Albania aligned themselves with the November EU sanctions against 15 Belarusian individuals.
- On 11 December, Switzerland joined the November EU sanctions against 15 Belarusian individuals.
- On 17 December, the EU imposed a third round of economic sanctions on dozens of Belarusian individuals and entities. They include restrictive measures imposed on the head of Belarusian state television, Ivan Eismont, Deputy Prime Minister Anatol Sivak, Information Minister Ihar Lutsky, and 26 other individuals. The sanctions package also included asset freezes on seven Belarusian companies, including arms exporter CJSC Beltechexport.
- On 23 December, the US imposed sanctions on one Belarusian individual and four entities, including Central Election Commission of Belarus.

=== Allegations of foreign interference ===
According to Russia's press service statement issued on 19 August 2020, "Russia pointed out that foreign attempts to interfere in the country's domestic affairs were unacceptable and could further escalate tensions". Georgy Saralidze, advisor to the director of the All-Russia State Television and Radio Broadcasting Company on program policy, noted in an interview with Vestnik Kavkaza that western countries had been striving to isolate Belarus away from Russia for several years. "The main goal is to prevent the expansion of the Union State, and ideally just to destroy it. What Vladimir Putin said to Merkel and Macron is a very symptomatic thing, because now there are attacks that Russia allegedly interferes in the affairs of Belarus. Moreover, there are no statements on the part of Russia, apart from the recognition of the election results. If you call it interference, then those who do not recognize the election also interfere in the affairs of Belarus."

Lukashenko announced a week after the election that NATO forces were, "at the gates" and threatening the country (which was denied by NATO), prompting President Putin to offer to send in military assistance, A Kremlin spokesman, Dmitry Peskov, on 19 August stated that there was no need for Russia to help Belarus militarily or otherwise at present. Belarus and Russia are members of the Collective Security Treaty Organisation (CSTO), a Russia-led military alliance of six former Soviet states, and part of a Belarus–Russia Union State. President of the European Council Charles Michel spoke on 19 August about interference in Belarus, "It's important for both the EU and Russia to support the democratic process in Belarus. We want to avoid external interference in Belarus." He added that he had read recent statements from Kremlin that it does not intend to interfere militarily.

On 18 September 2020, Belarus Foreign Minister accused United Nations Human Rights Council of meddling in Belarus internal affairs over the UN Human Rights Council's resolution calling for the close monitoring of alleged rights violations in Belarus. The resolution came after the violent crackdown on protests of disputed presidential election.

On 17 April 2021, the Russian FSB issued a statement that it had prevented an attempt at a coup d'état in Belarus, said to have been planned with the support of the United States, in collaboration with the Belarusian KGB. Some political pundits and the US Department of State dismissed the allegation as false.

In a May 2021 Zoom call, Carl Gershman and other senior officials of the National Endowment for Democracy (NED) claimed to Russian comedians Vovan and Lexus (posing as Belarusian opposition leader Svetlana Tikhanovskaya and an aide) that the NED "support[s] many, many groups and [has] a very, very active program throughout the country" and that it had helped inspire the Belarusian protests.

== Support for victims ==
On 14 August 2020, the Belarus Solidarity Foundation (BYSOL) was established. Its main aims are to support courtyard initiatives, emergency relocation, support for the families of political prisoners and helping those fired for political reasons. In 2020, BYSOL raised €2.9 million to support those fired for political reasons, striking factories, and people forced to relocate.

Unregistered candidate Valery Tsepkalo created a non-profit organization "Belarus of the Future". The primary goal of the program was to support citizens of Belarus who suffered from political repression. Before the organization existed, people self-organized the funds with the intention to support victims of oppression in Belarus, using the funds to pay for fines received during the protests.

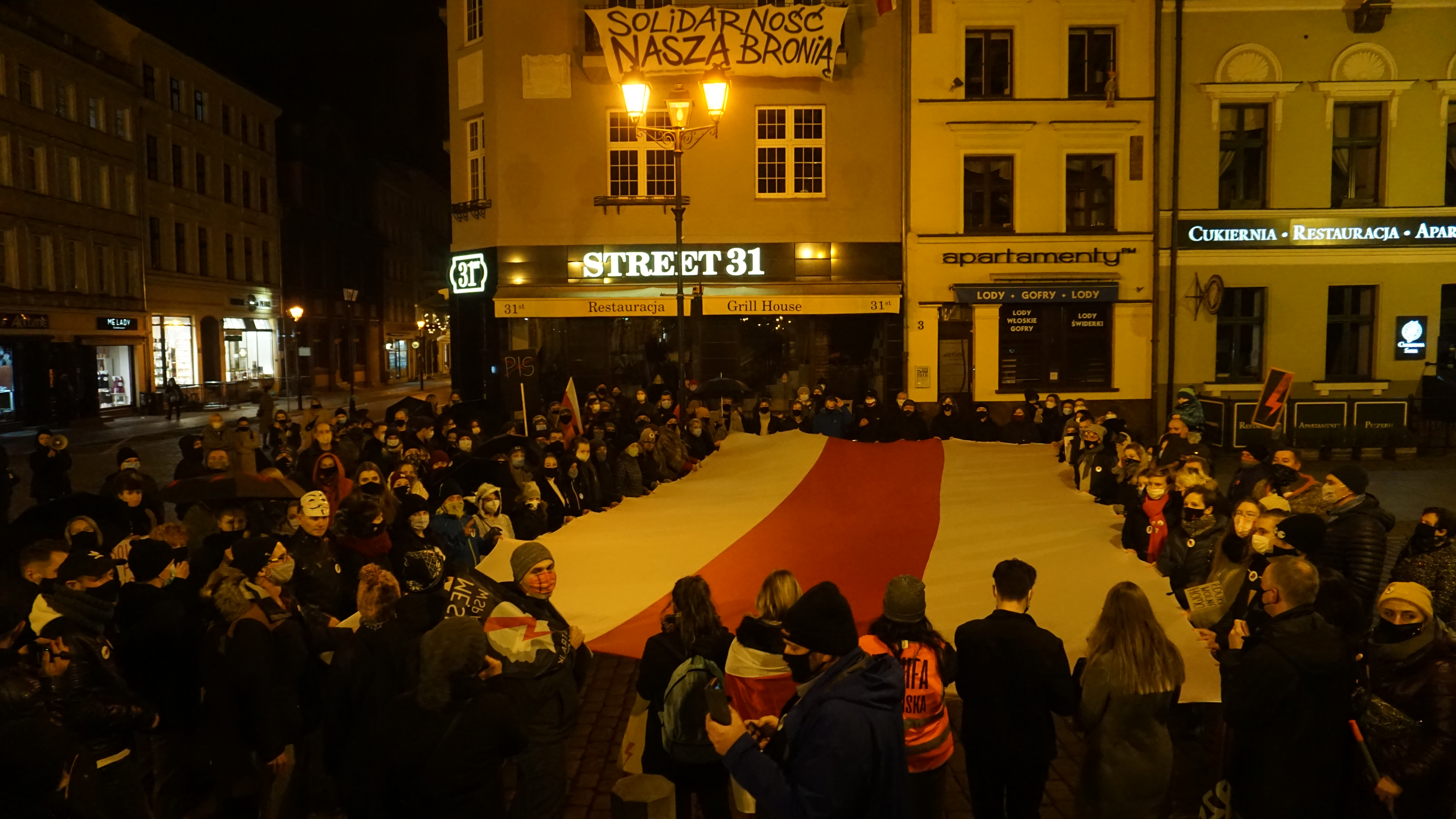
9 November 2020 protest in Toruń against Poland's new abortion laws: protesters supporting Belarus democratic rallies

Mikita Mikado, the CEO of PandaDoc, which has Belarusian roots, offered to support authorities (police officers, army and security forces) that want to retire, but cannot for financial reasons. The CEO was planning to resign based on the latest events. Mikado published a video and asked to contact him directly to get full support.

Alexandre Schneerson, the CEO of ISSoft, announced "The Belarusian society has invested a lot in the IT industry. We are part of the people of Belarus and we believe that the time has come for IT specialists to support those who suffered during the peaceful protests."

The Polish Prime Minister Mateusz Morawiecki announced on 14 August an €11 million fund to help protesters get visas and settle in Poland. Morawiecki stated that Poland would provide support for Belarusian independent media and non-governmental organisations, and scholarships would also be available to Belarusian students in Poland. Lithuania offered medical assistance to injured protesters.

On 19 August, the EU promised €2 million to assist the victims of state violence and €1 million to support independent media as part of a €53 million package to support a peaceful transition.

Mikhail Orda, chairman of the Federation of Trade Unions of Belarus, called for law officers to investigate every case of violence in a detailed and objective manner, adding that the trade unions were willing to provide legal assistance to all victims.

== Symbols ==
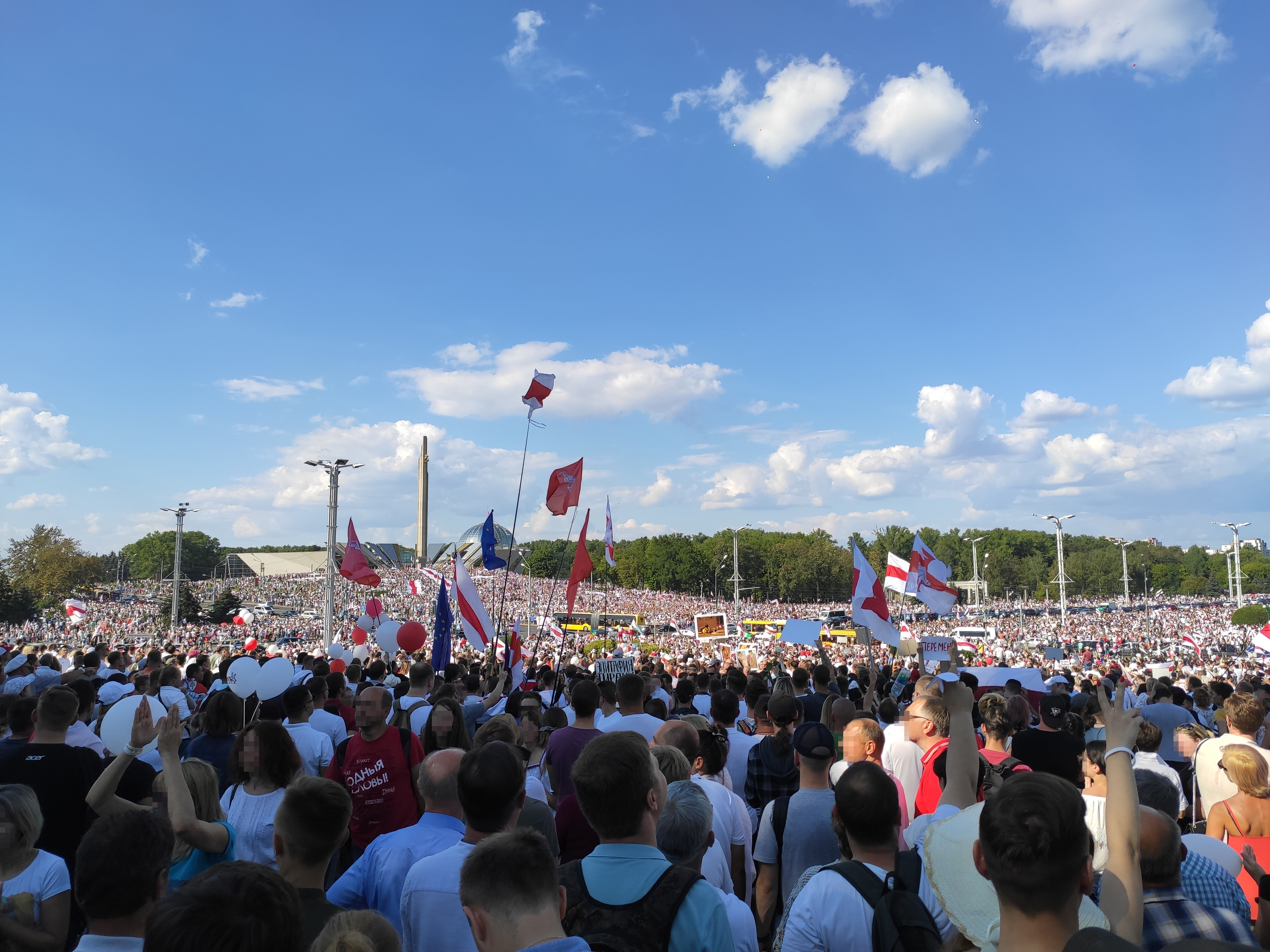
Protesters waving the European Union and white-red-white flags during a rally against Lukashenko, on 16 August 2020.

The white-red-white flag, which was the official flag of independent Belarus from 1991 to 1995, has been adopted by the pro-democracy opposition and became a symbol for everyone who actively opposed Lukashenko. De facto banned by the authorities, the flag has been frequently confiscated by the police at demonstrations. Other symbols used by opposition supporters include the former coat of arms of Belarus, known as the Pahonia (the historical coat of arms of the Grand Duchy of Lithuania), and the song Vajacki marš, which was the national anthem of the short-lived Belarusian People's Republic, as well as the song Pahonia (lyrics based on the poem by Maksim Bahdanovich, music by Mikola Kulikovich). A common slogan used by protesters is the phrase Long live Belarus! (Жыве Беларусь!, romanised: Žyvie Biełaruś!). Anti-Lukashenko protesters have also used the current state flag of Belarus on rare occasions. In a few isolated cases anti-Lukashenko demonstrators have used the flag of Europe.

The current state flag of Belarus has been universally used at demonstrations in support of Alexander Lukashenko. In a few isolated cases pro-Lukashenko demonstrators have used the flag of Russia, the Banner of Victory against Nazi Germany, the flag of the Soviet Union and the Ribbon of Saint George.

Current state flag of Belarus

The former flag of Belarus

Historic coat of arms of Belarus known as the Pahonia

Variant of the former flag of Belarus with the Pahonia coat of arms

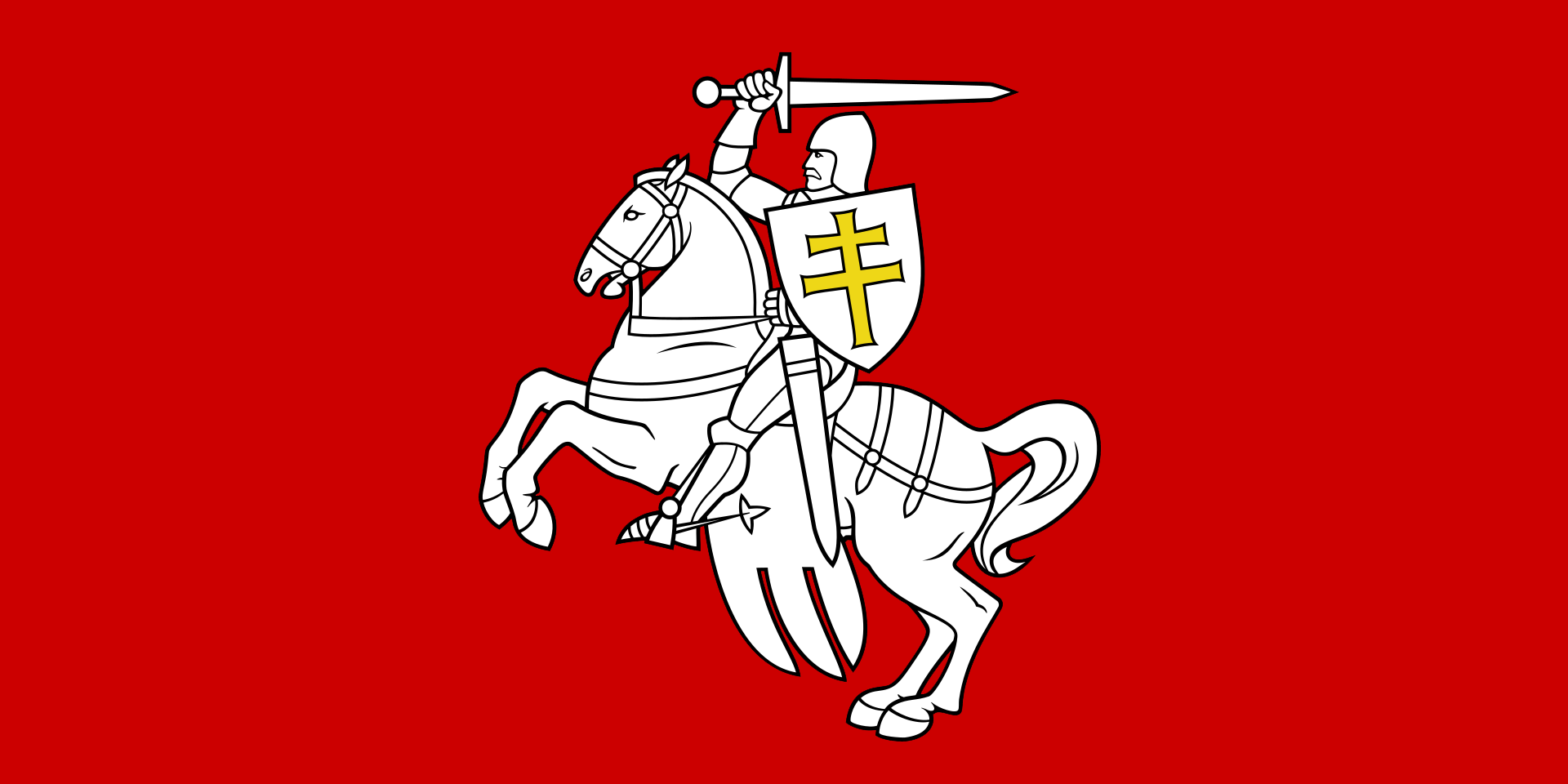
Heraldic banner of the Pahonia coat of arms

== Gallery ==
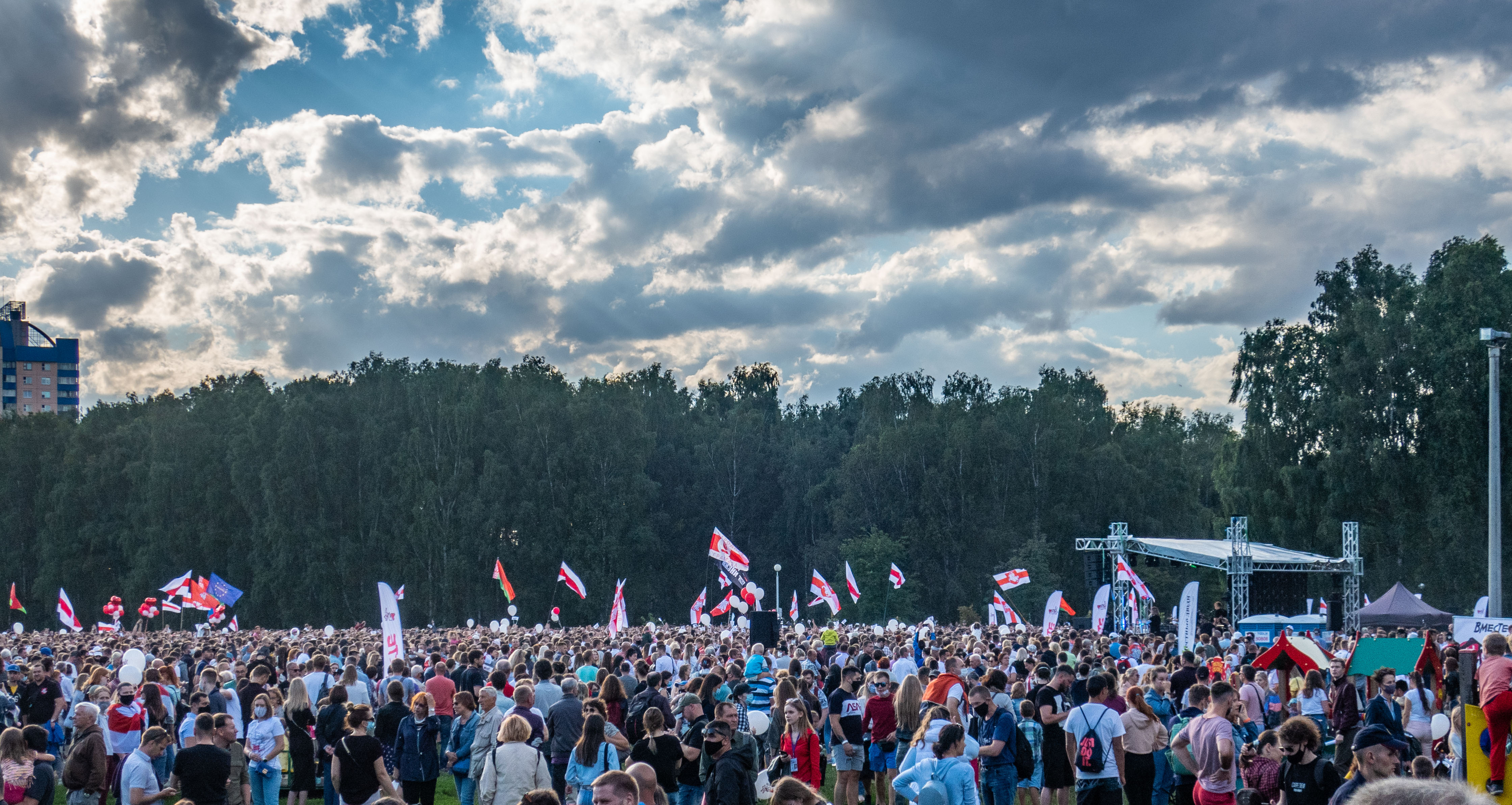
Rally in support of Tsikhanowskaya, 30 July

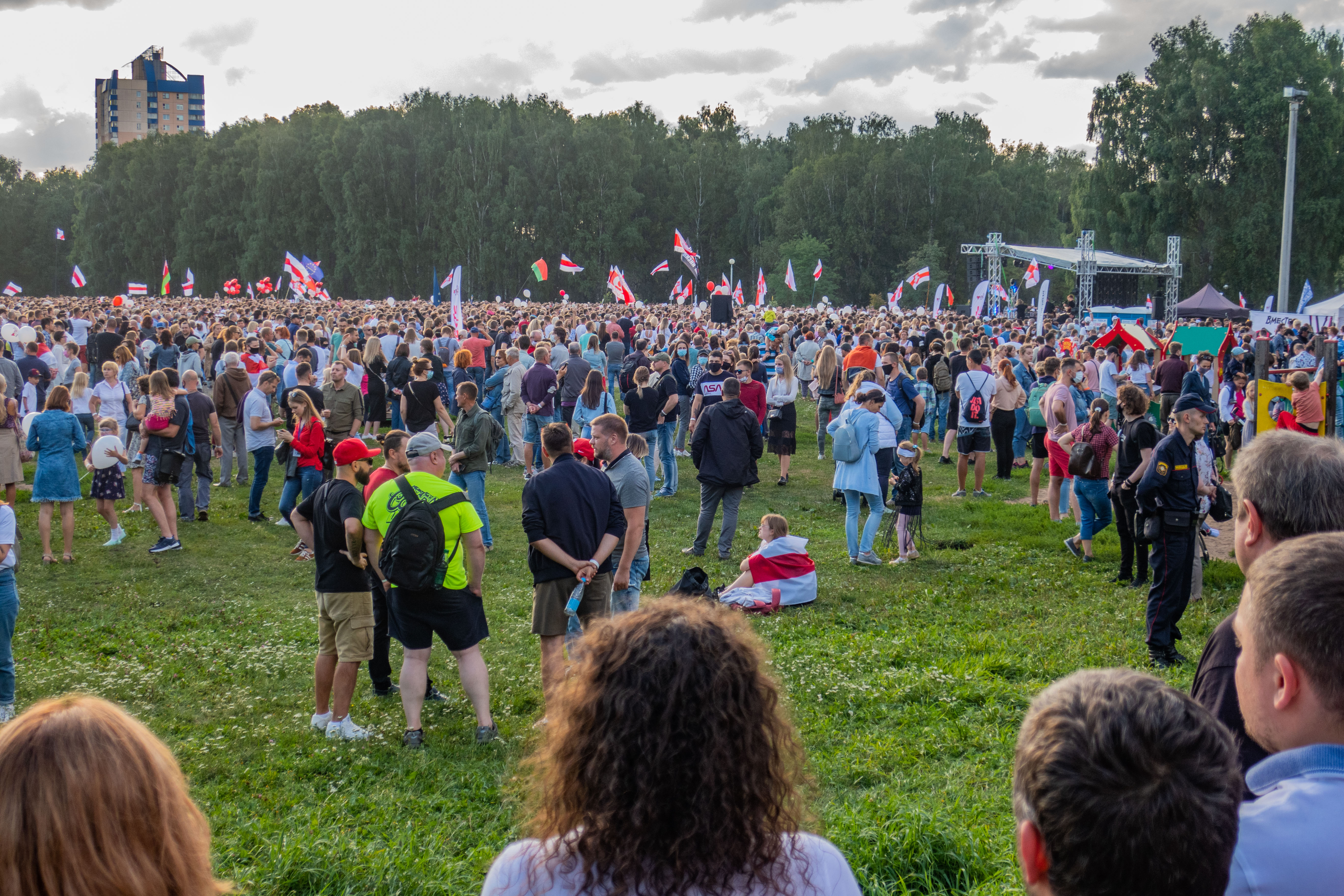

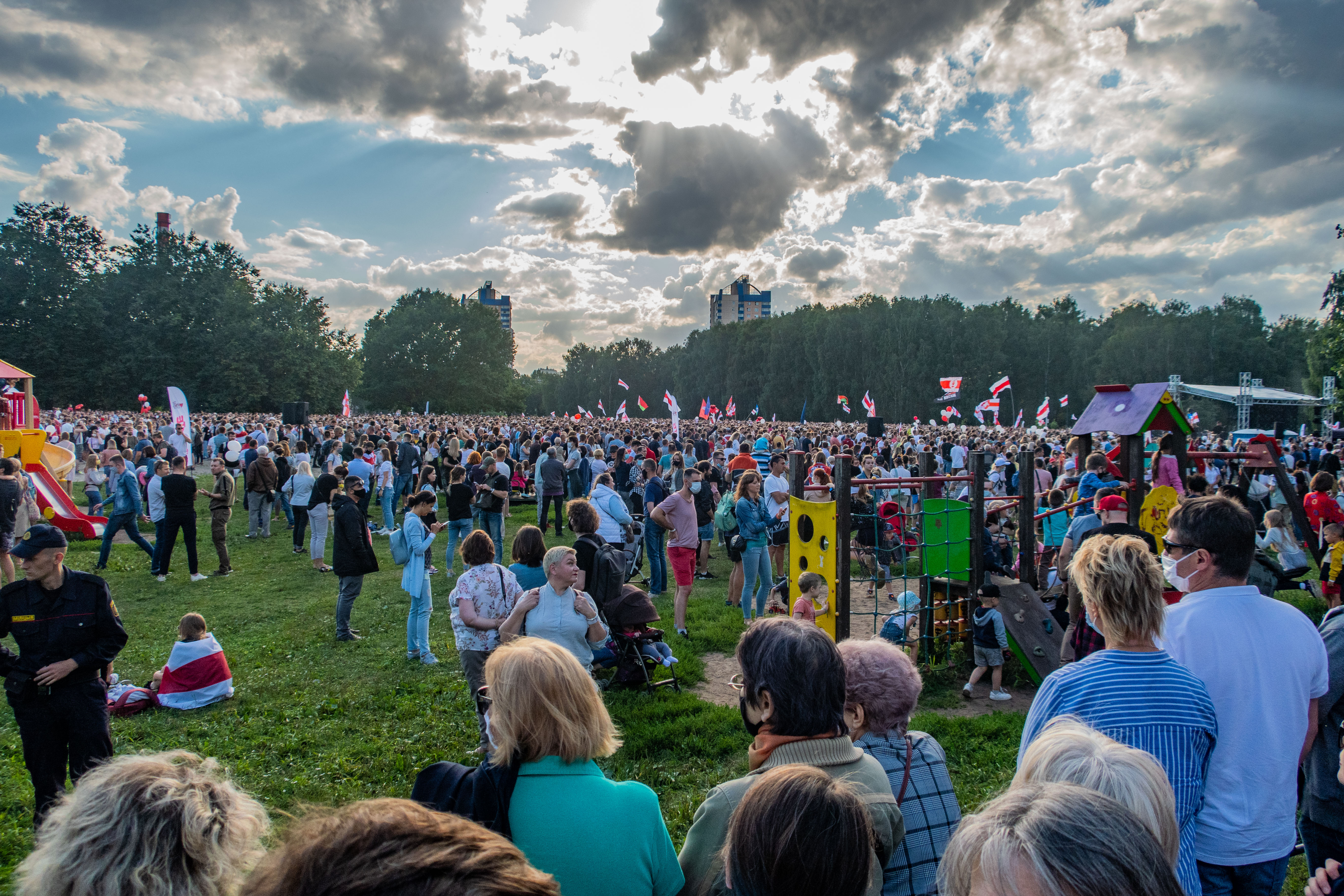

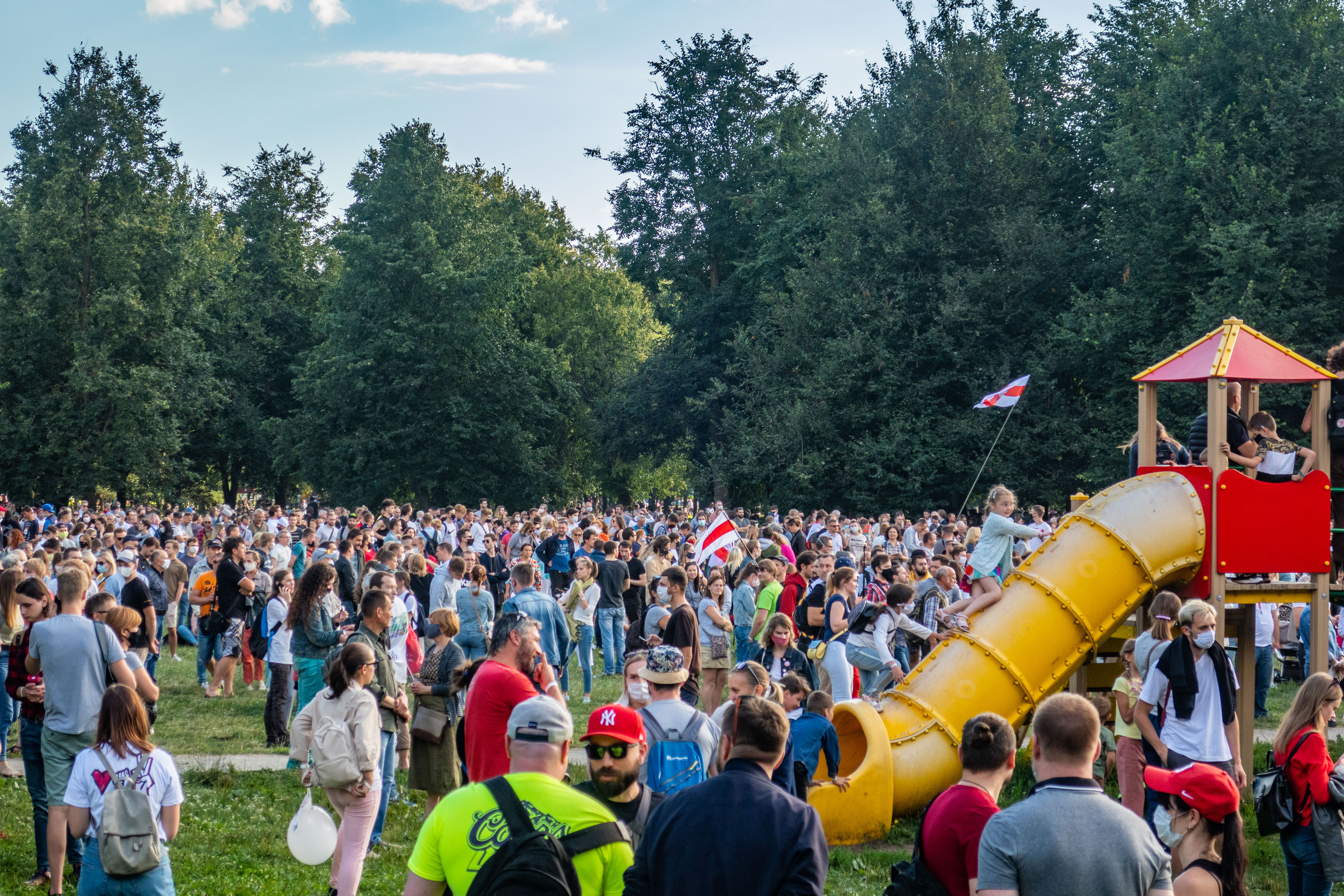

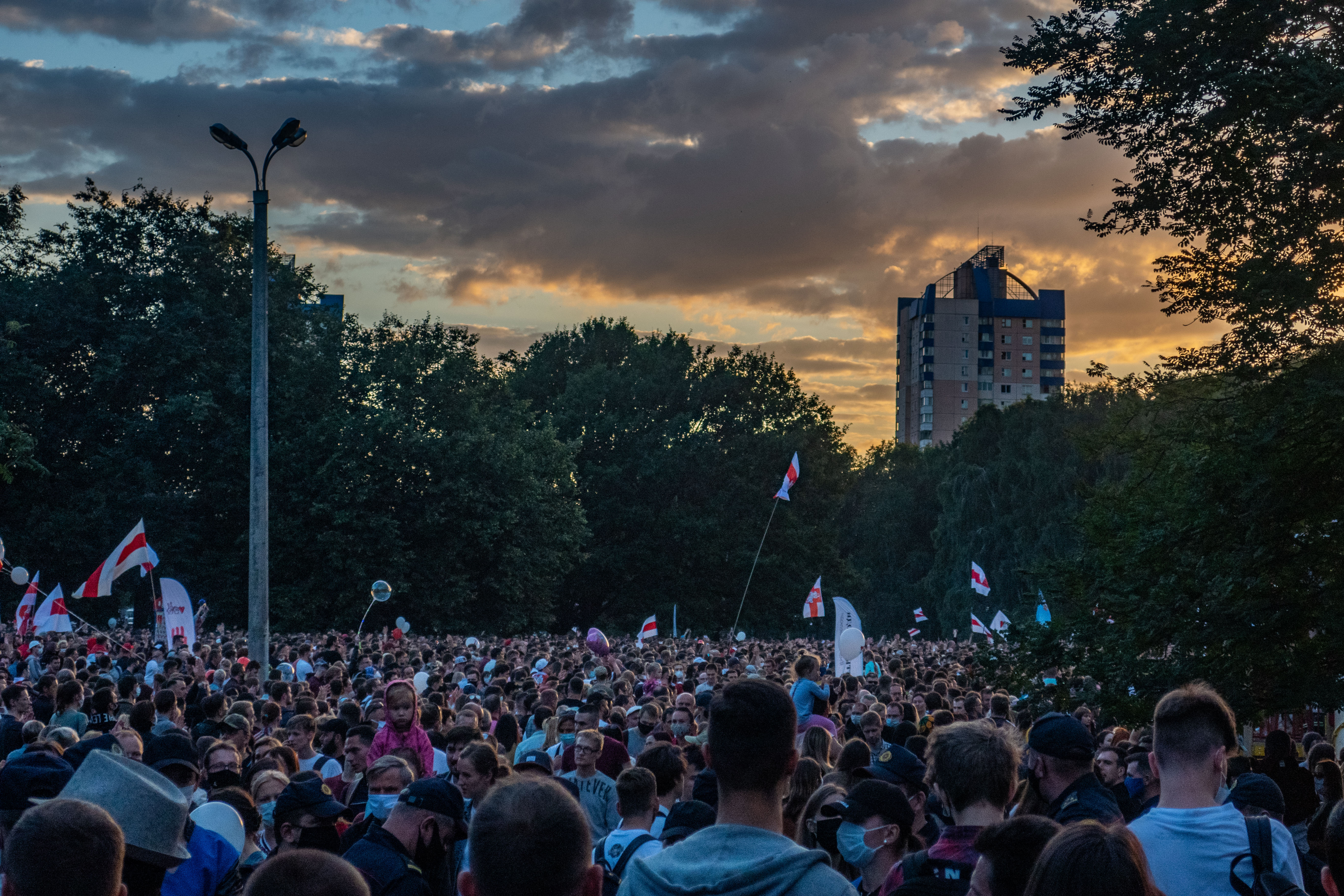

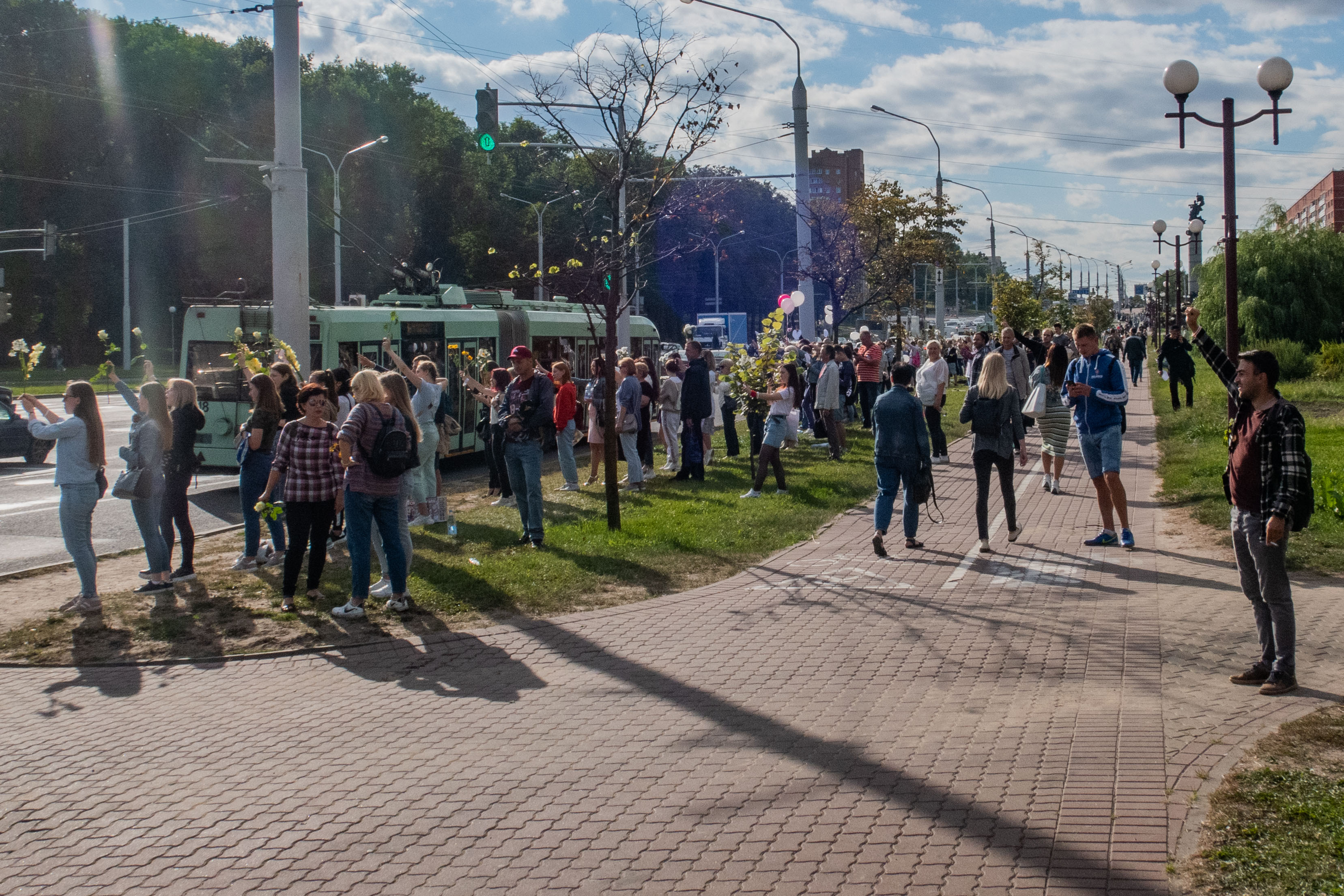
Local lines of solidarity during mass protests in Minsk, 13 August

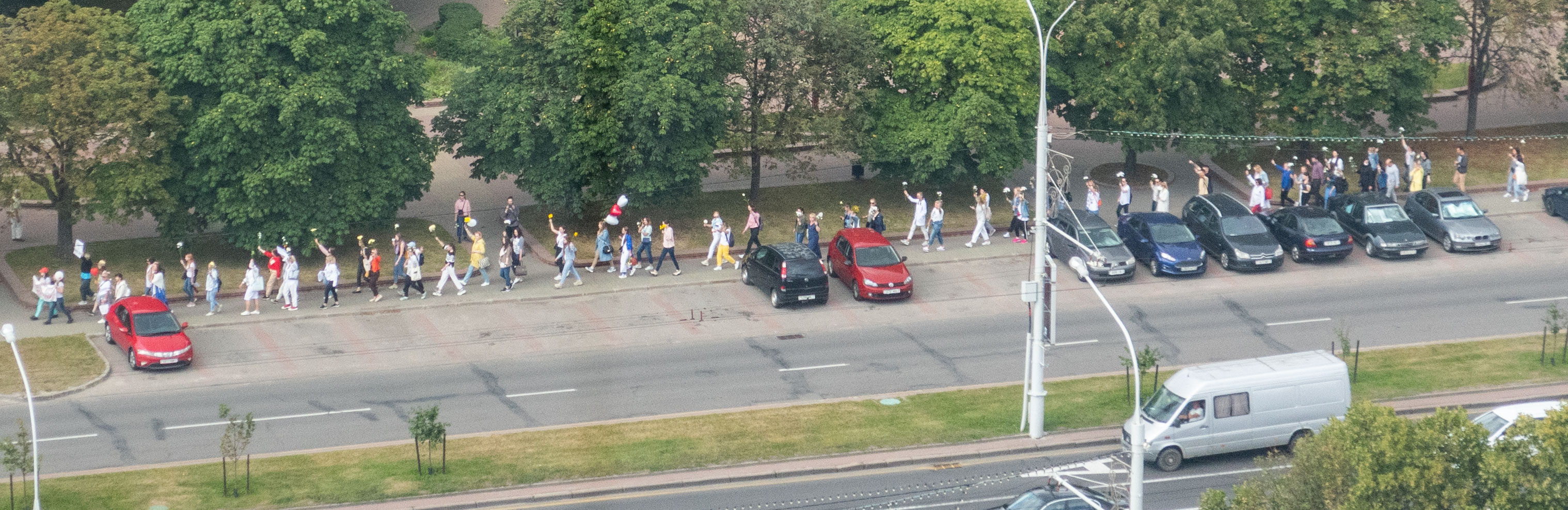

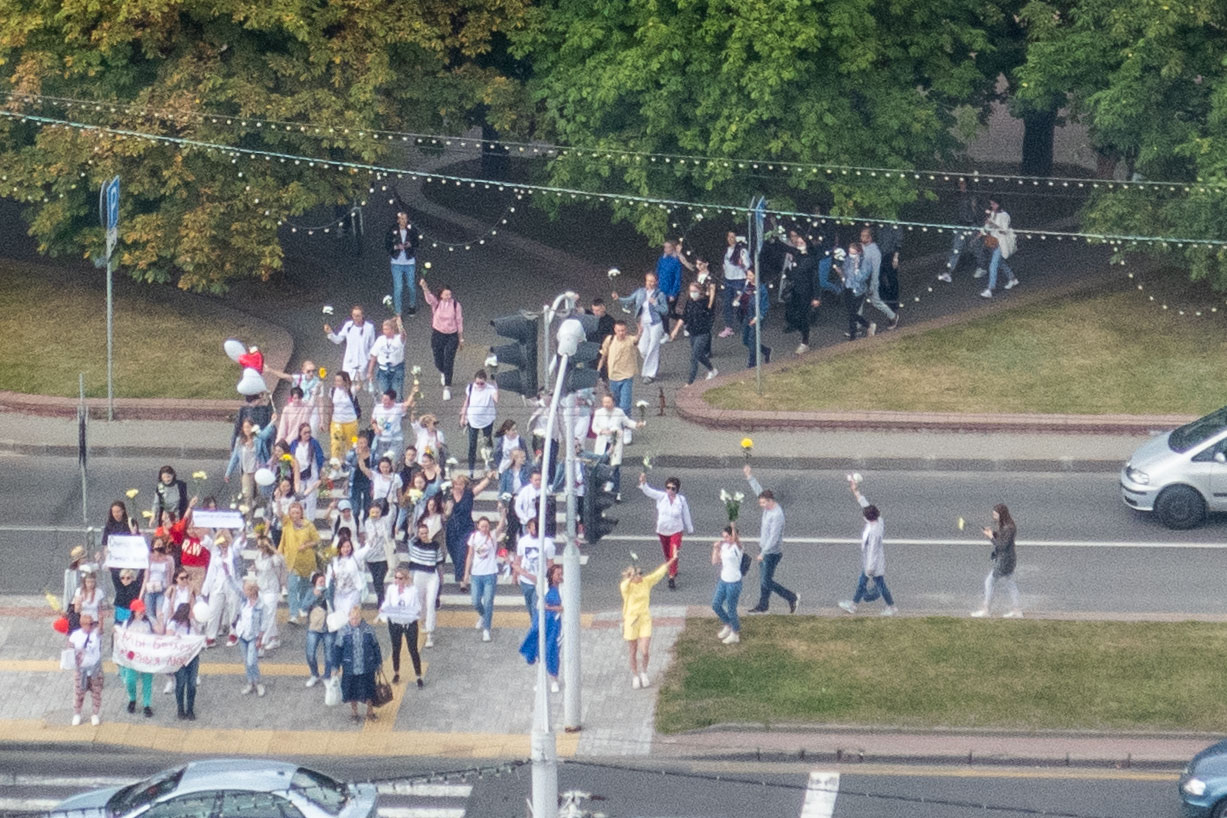

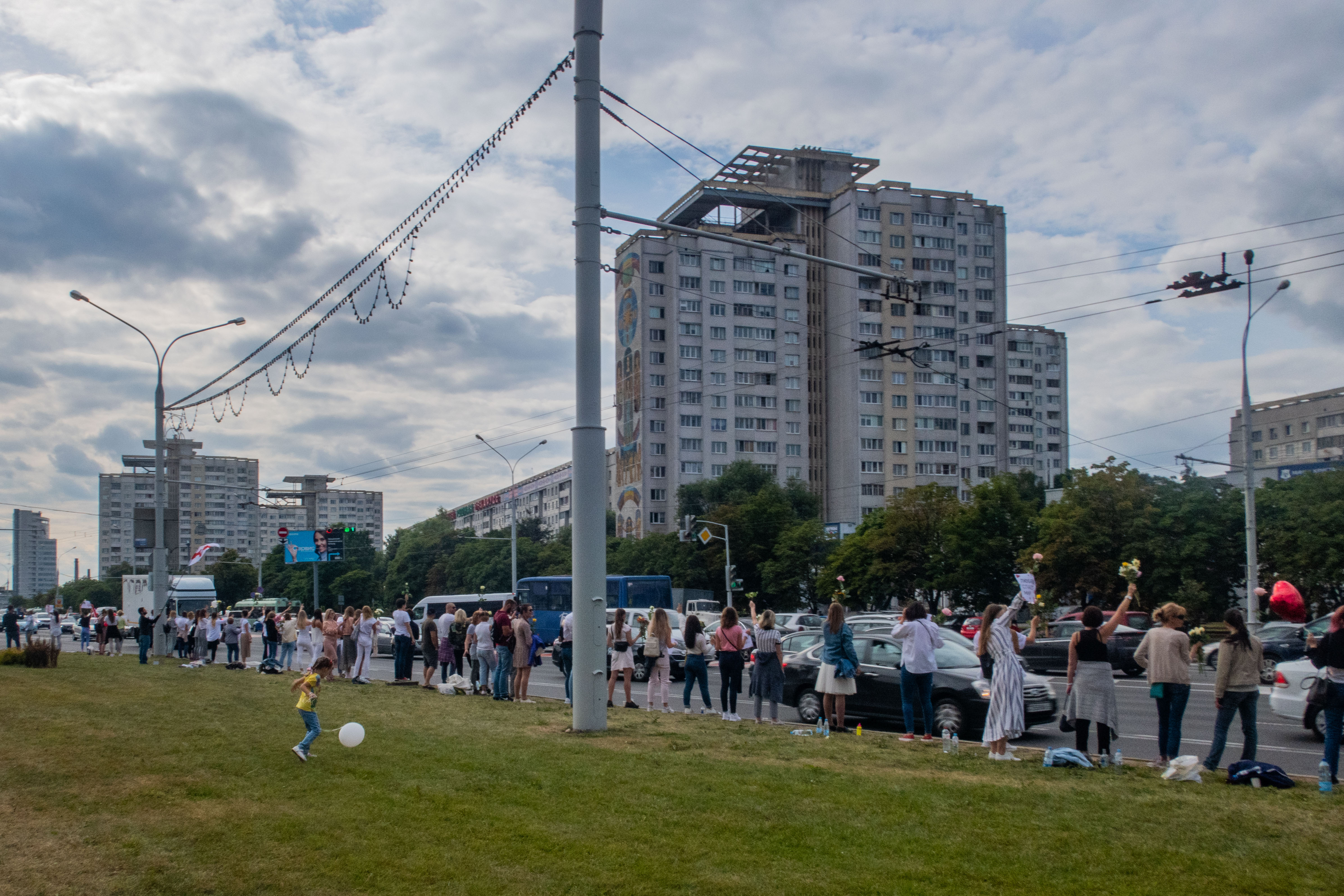
Local lines of solidarity in Minsk, 14 August

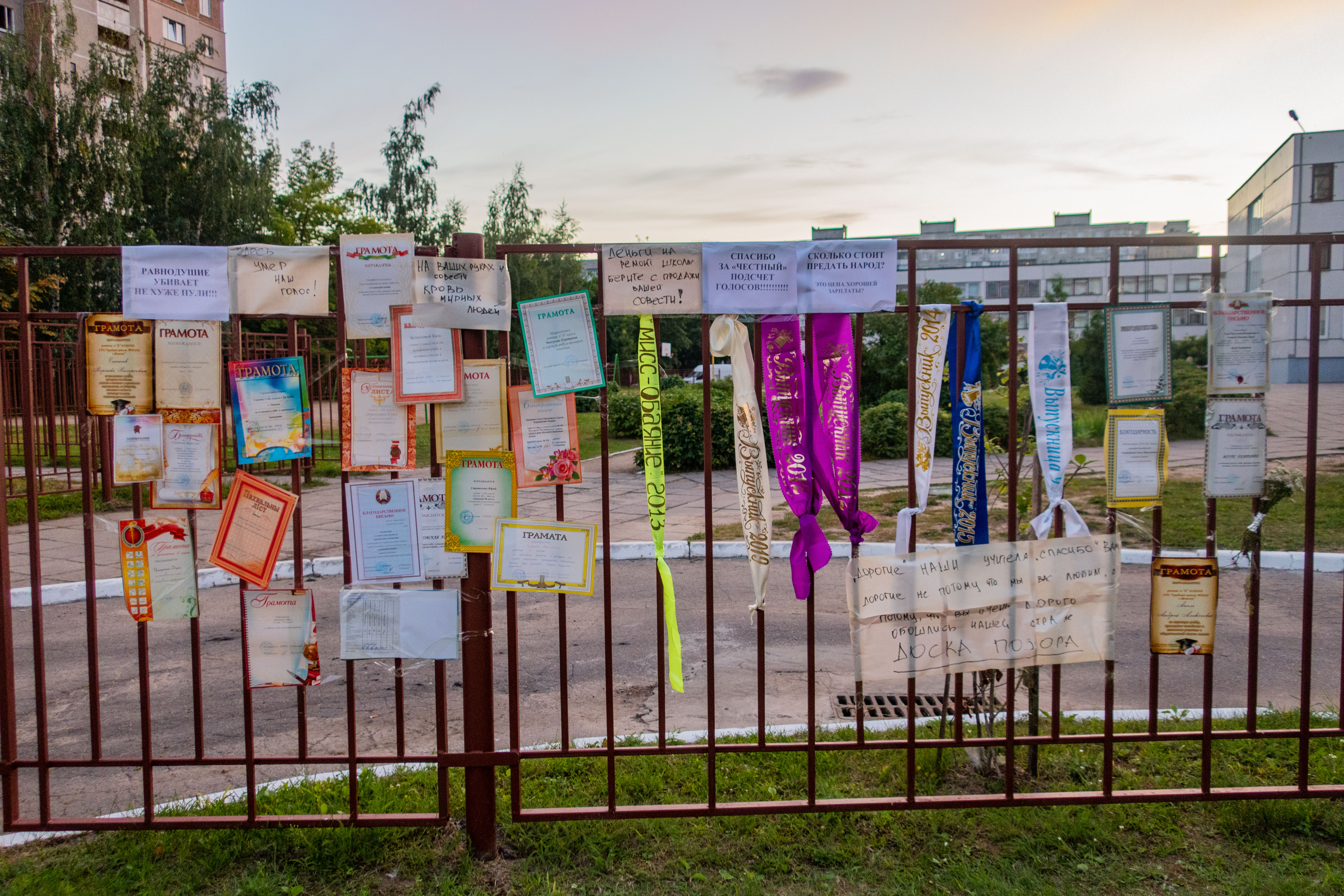
"Wall of shame" near a school with diplomas issued by the school, graduate sashes and protest inscriptions. Such installations were made in protest against presumable falsifications by the teachers

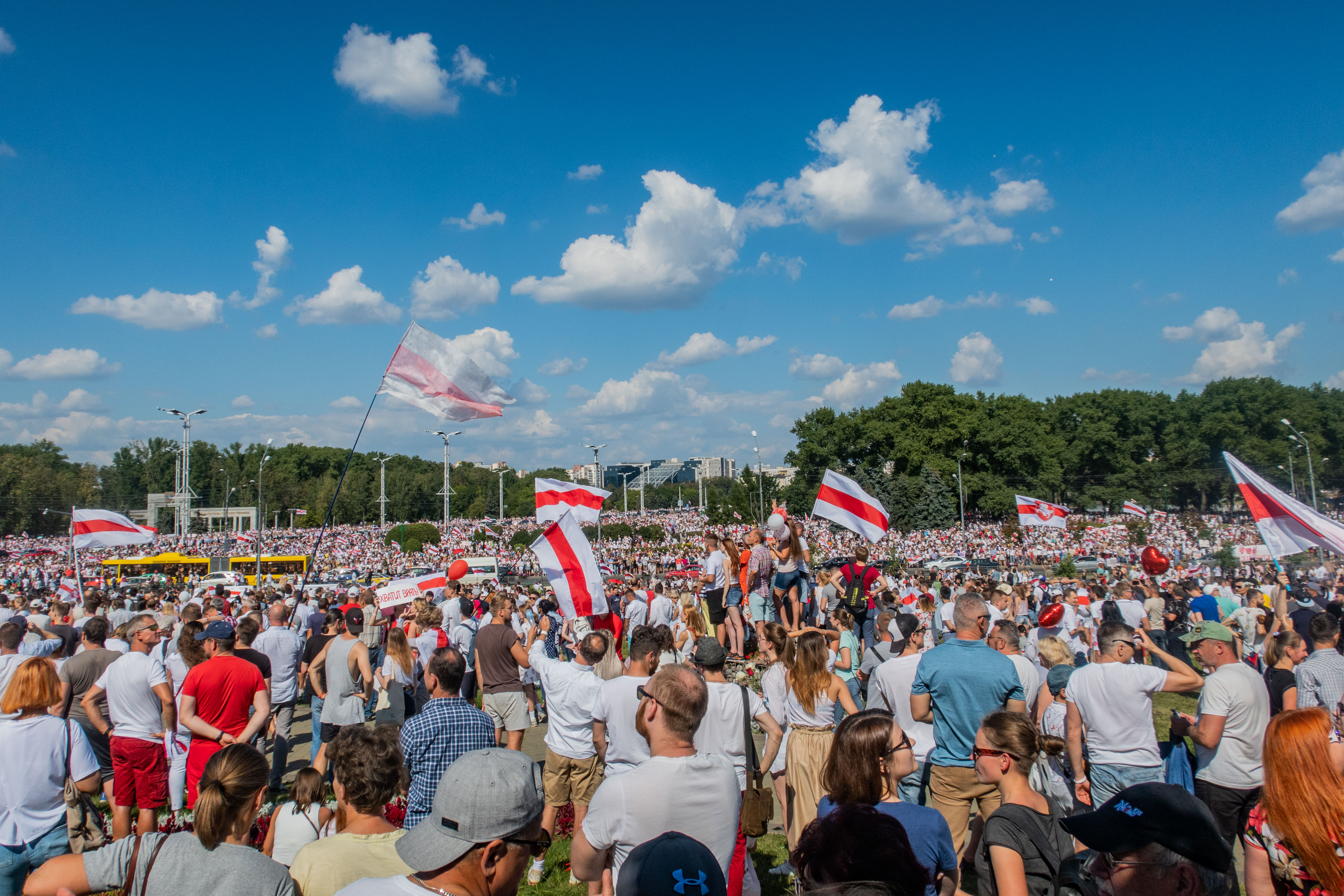
Protesters in Minsk on 16 August

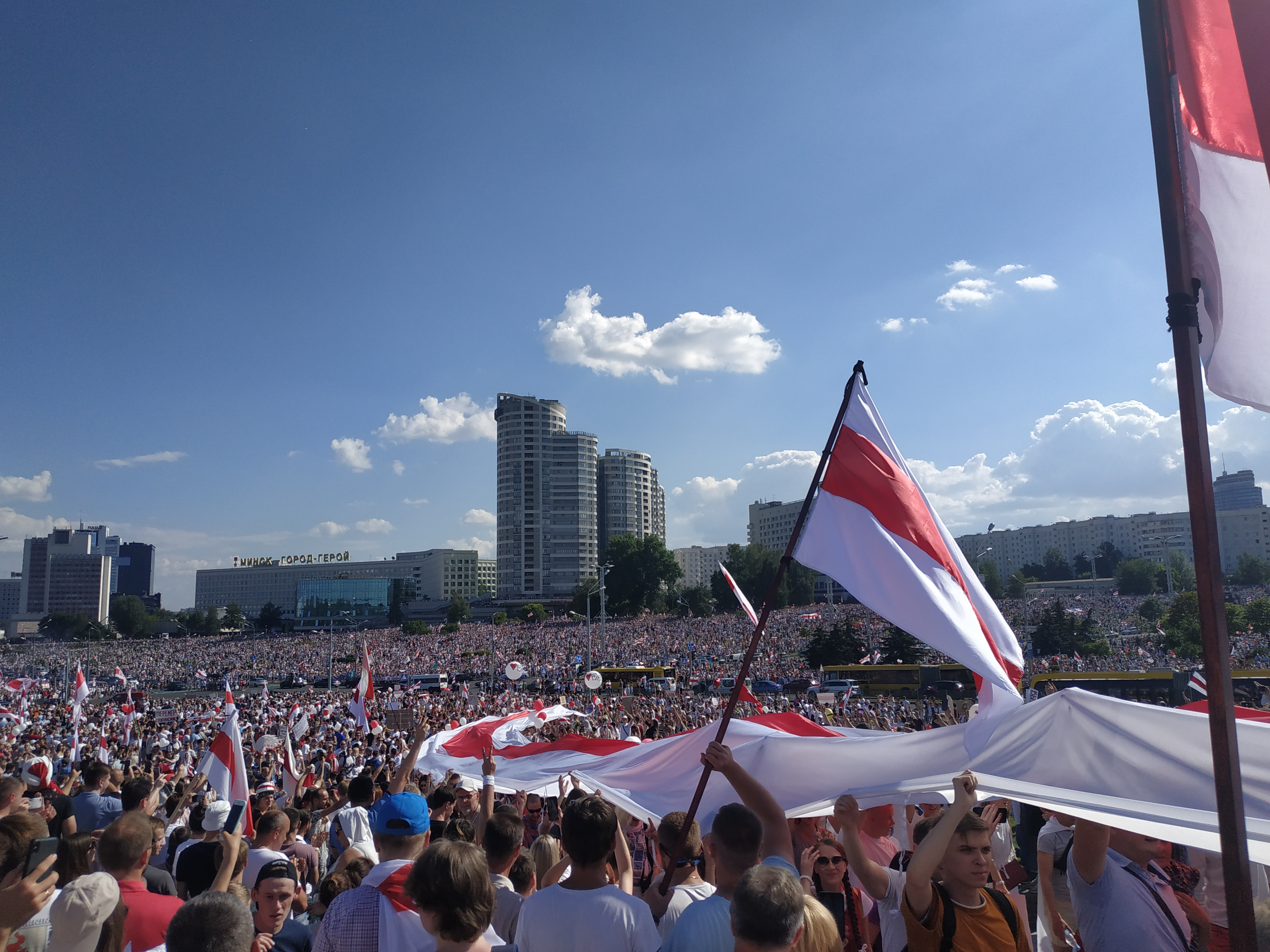

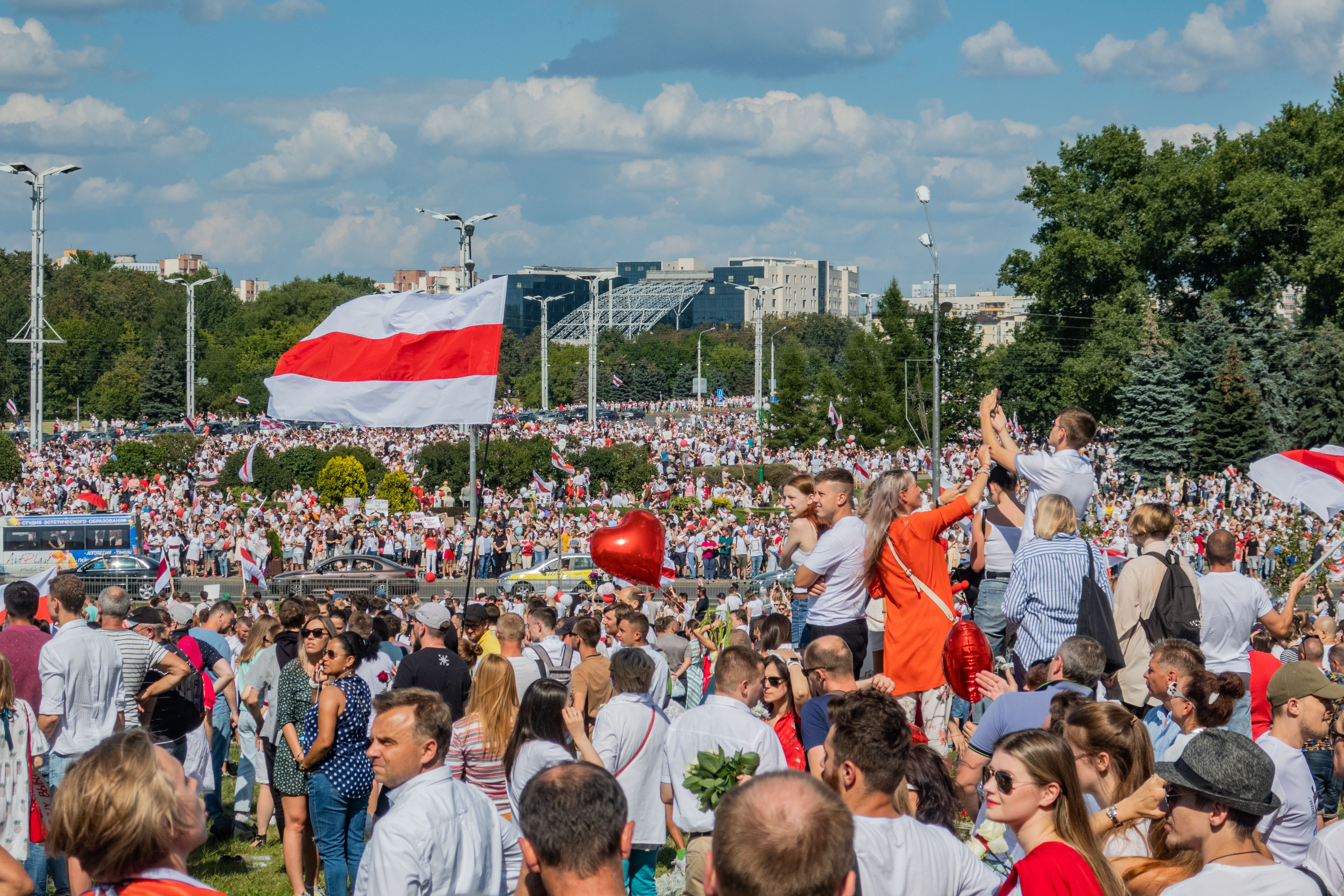

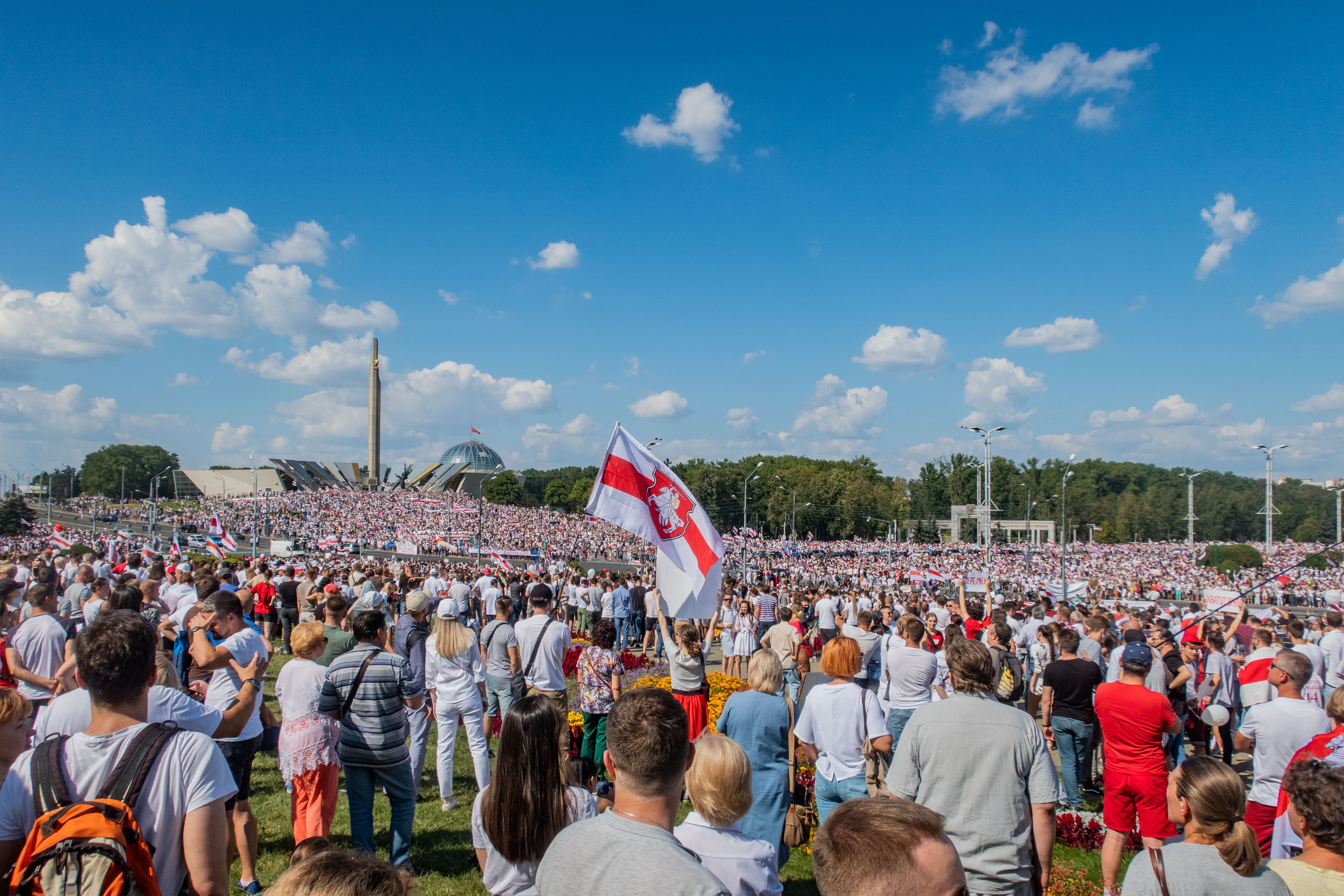

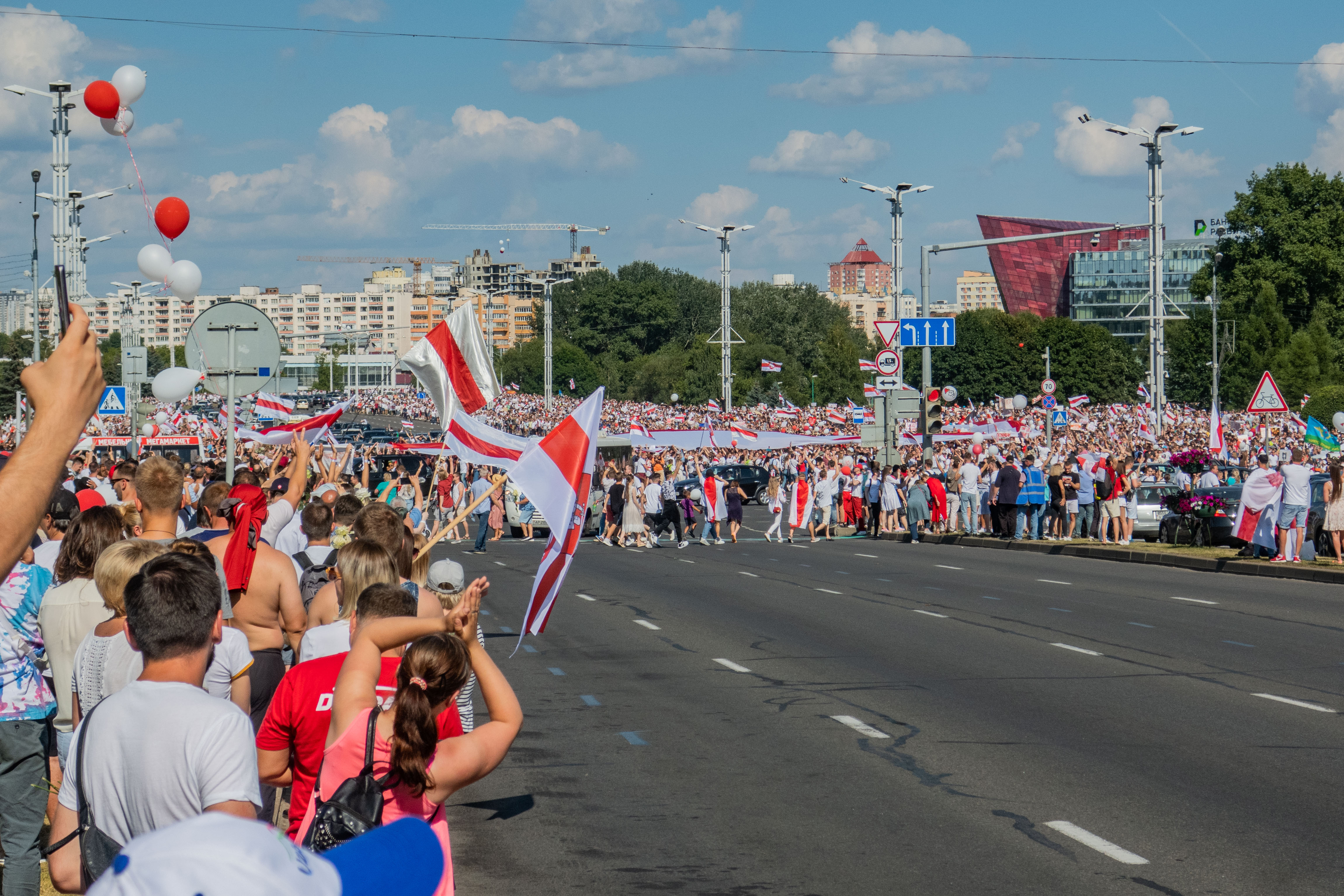

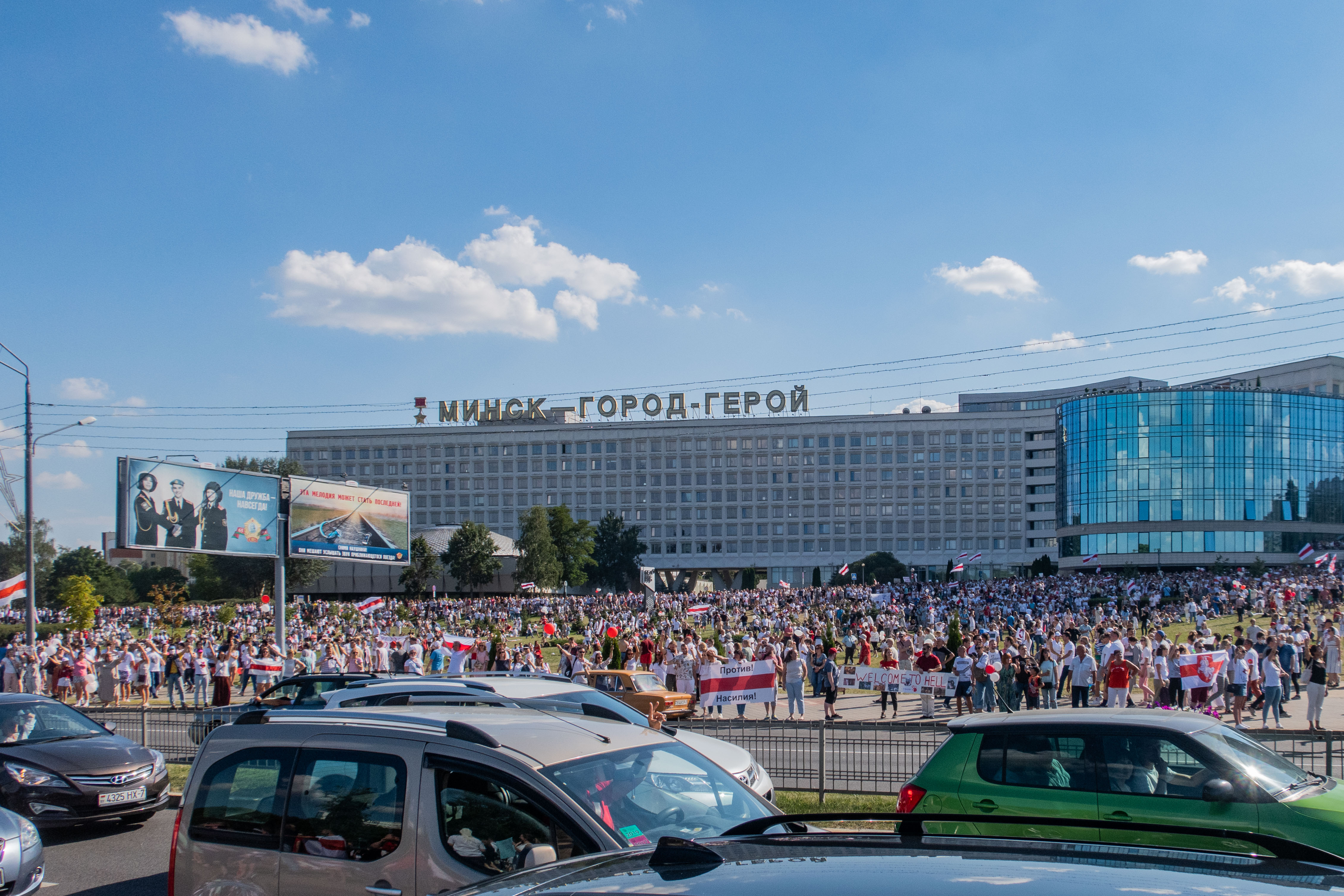

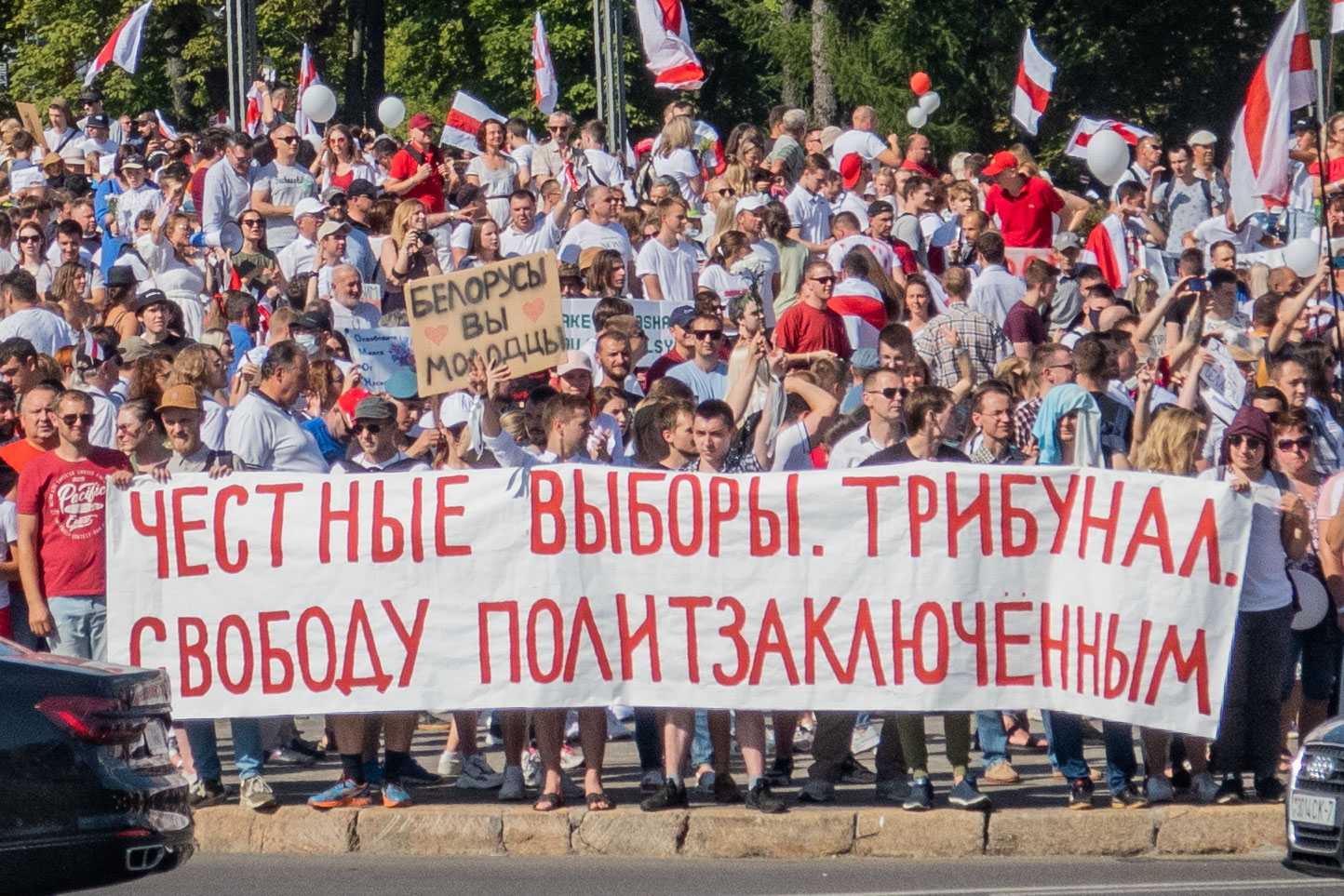
Protest poster: "Fair elections. Tribunal. Freedom for political prisoners", 16 August

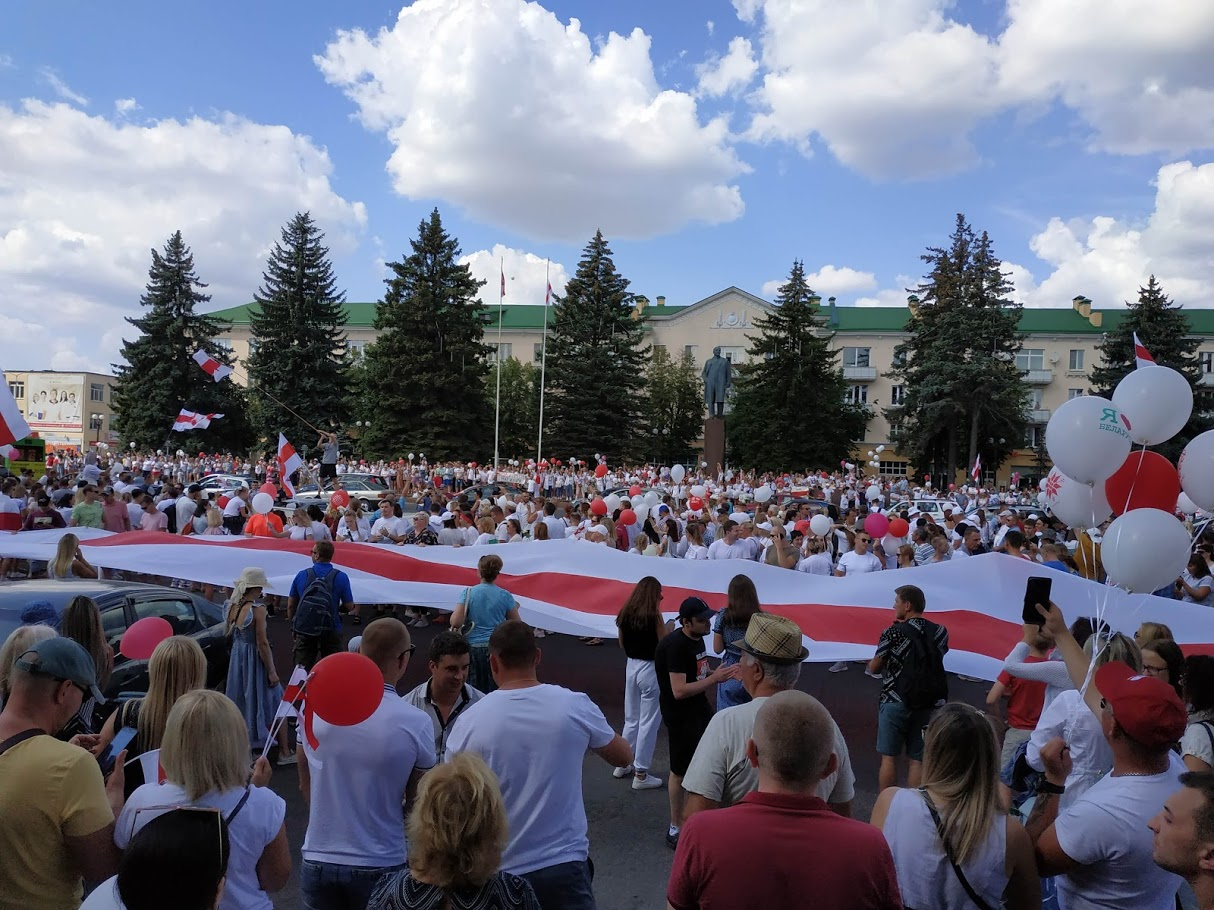
Rally against Lukashenko and violence, in Baranavichy, 16 August

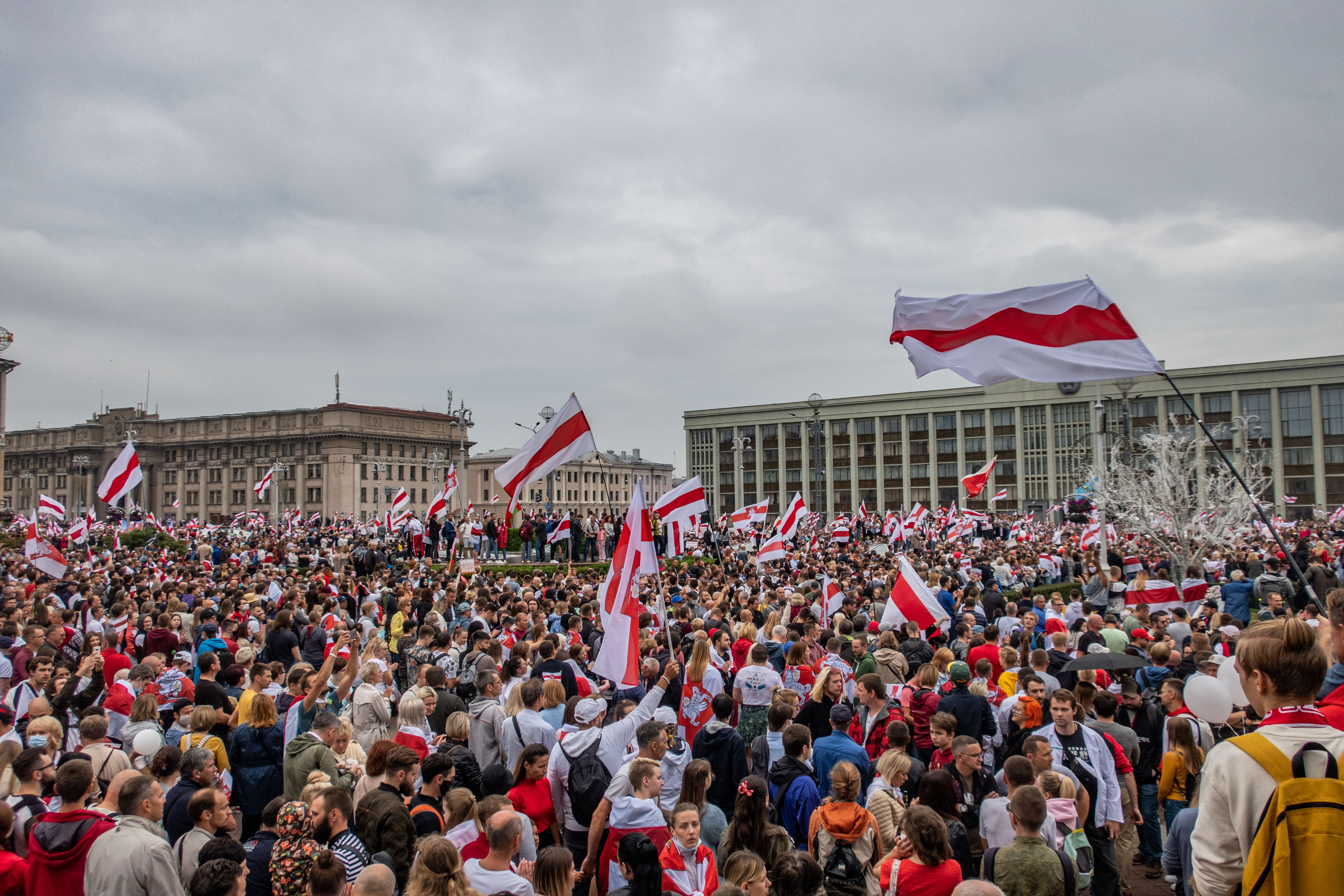
Rally against Lukashenko in Minsk, 23 August

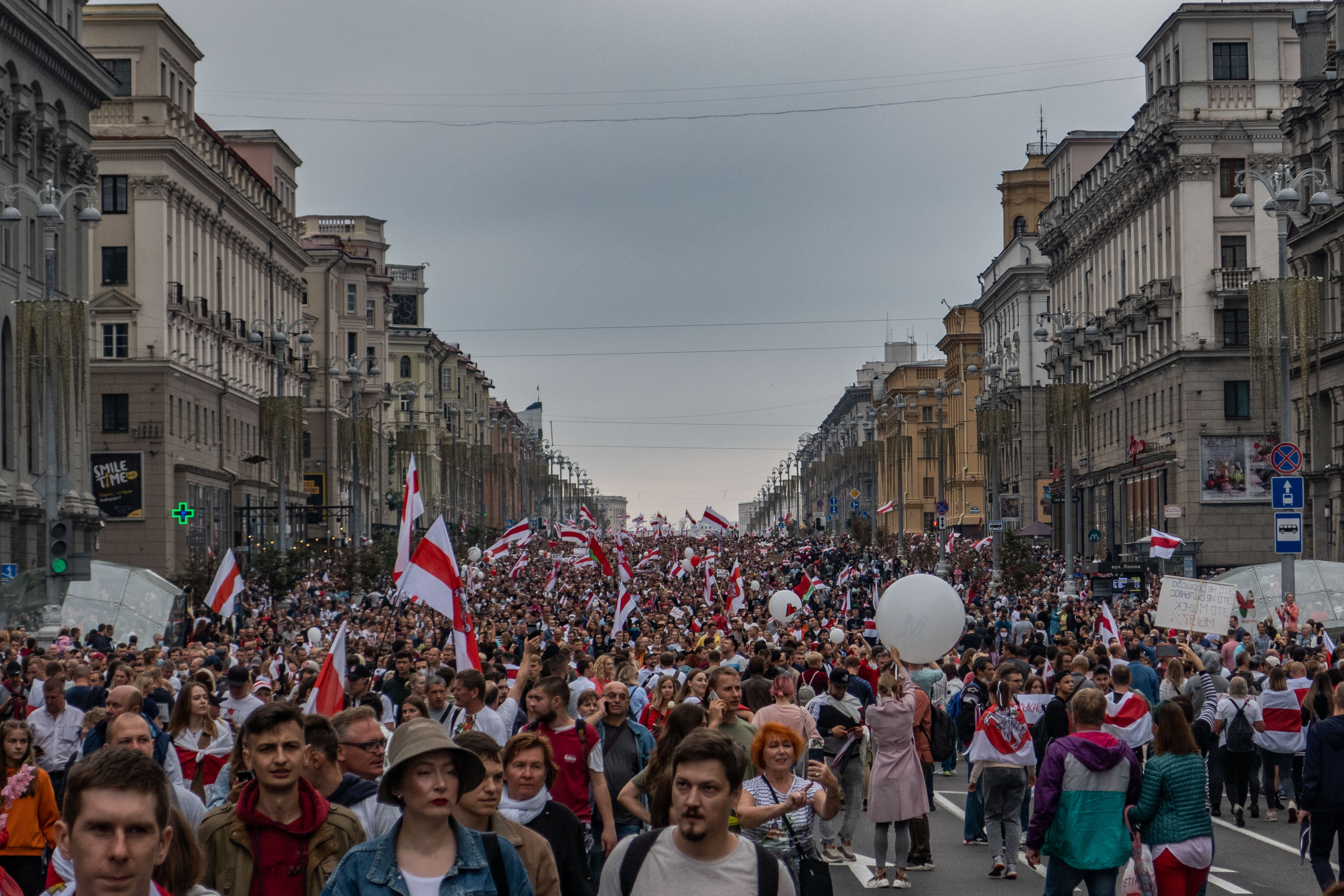

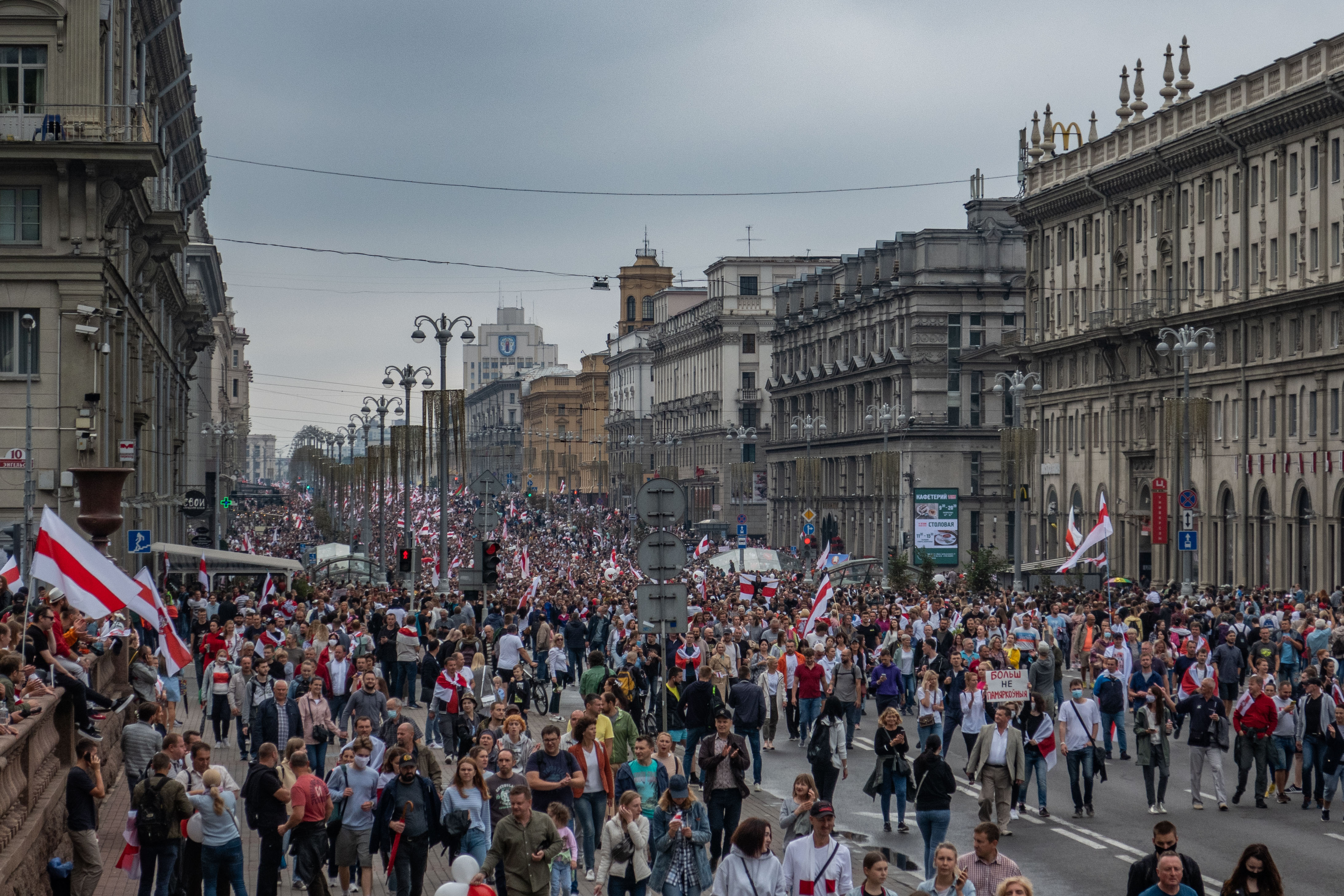

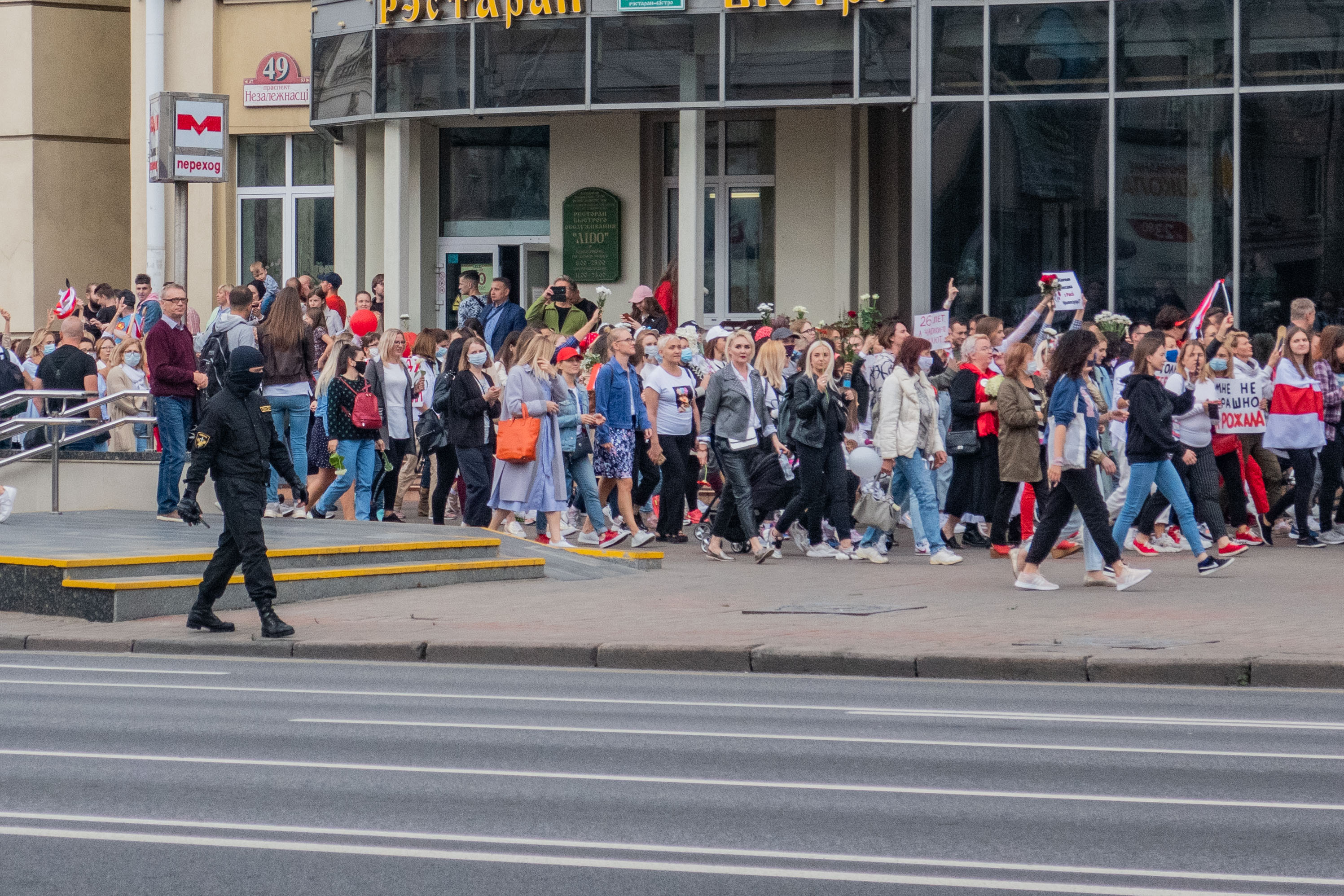
"Women's march" against Lukashenko in Minsk, 29 August

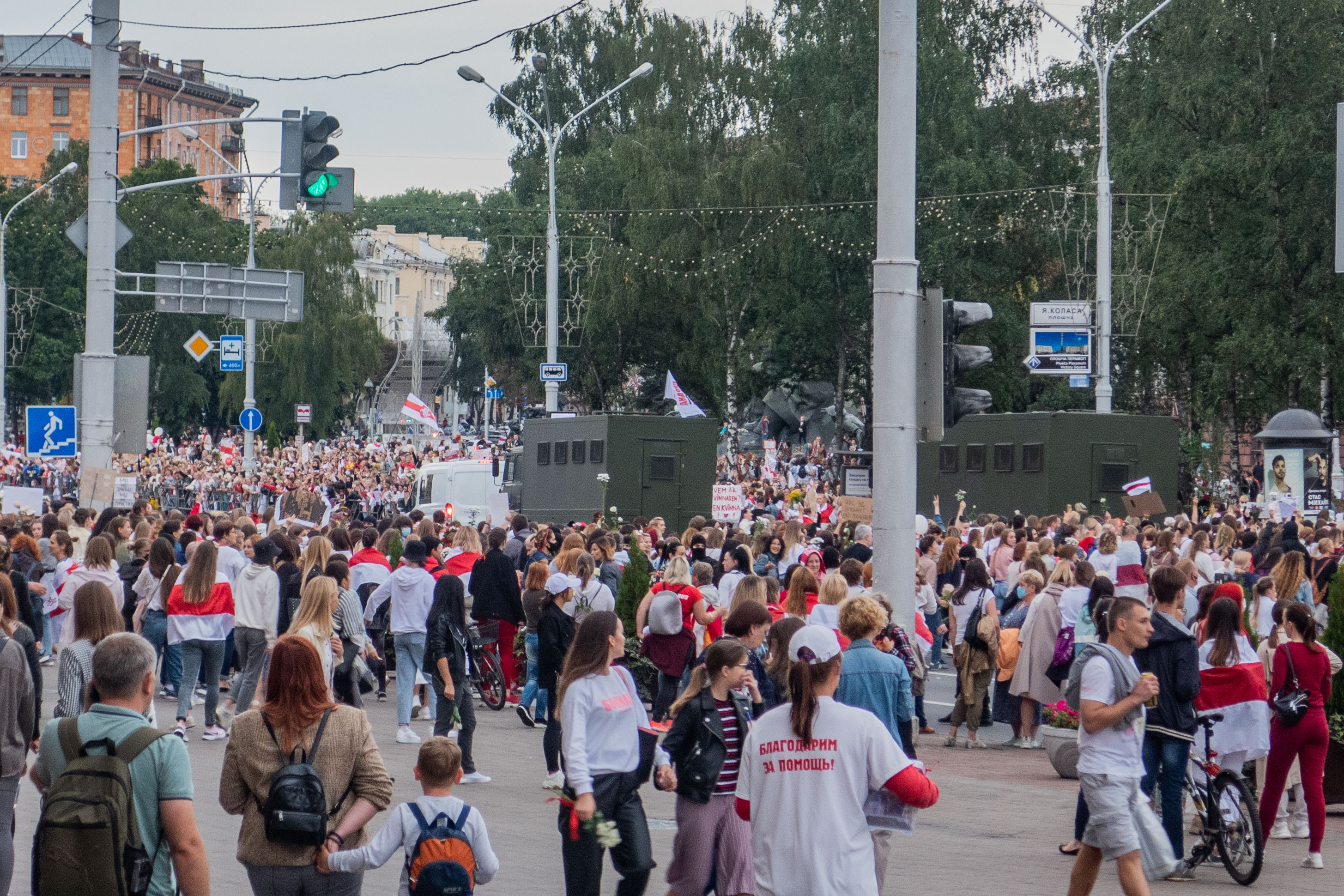

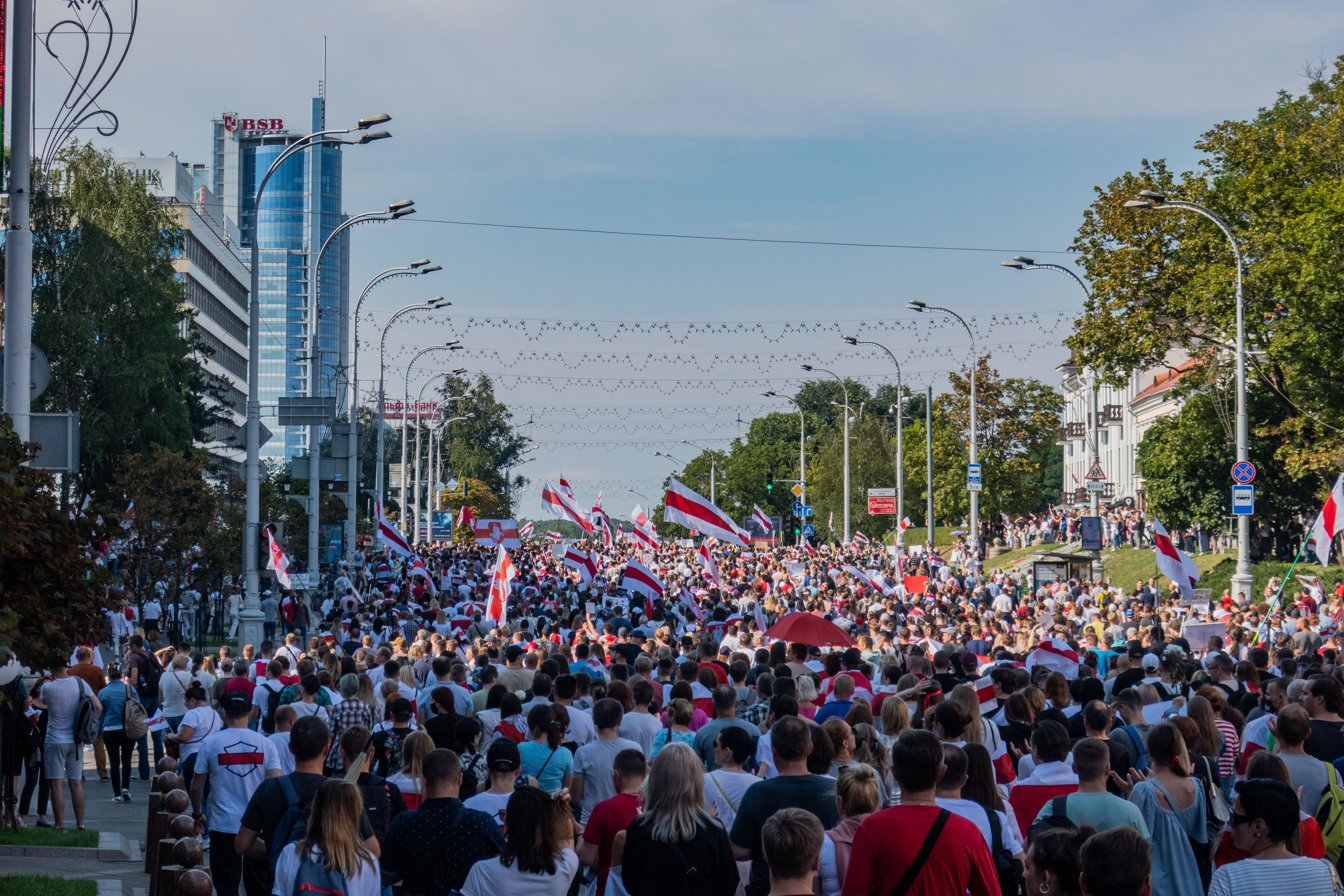
Rally against Lukashenko in Minsk, 30 August

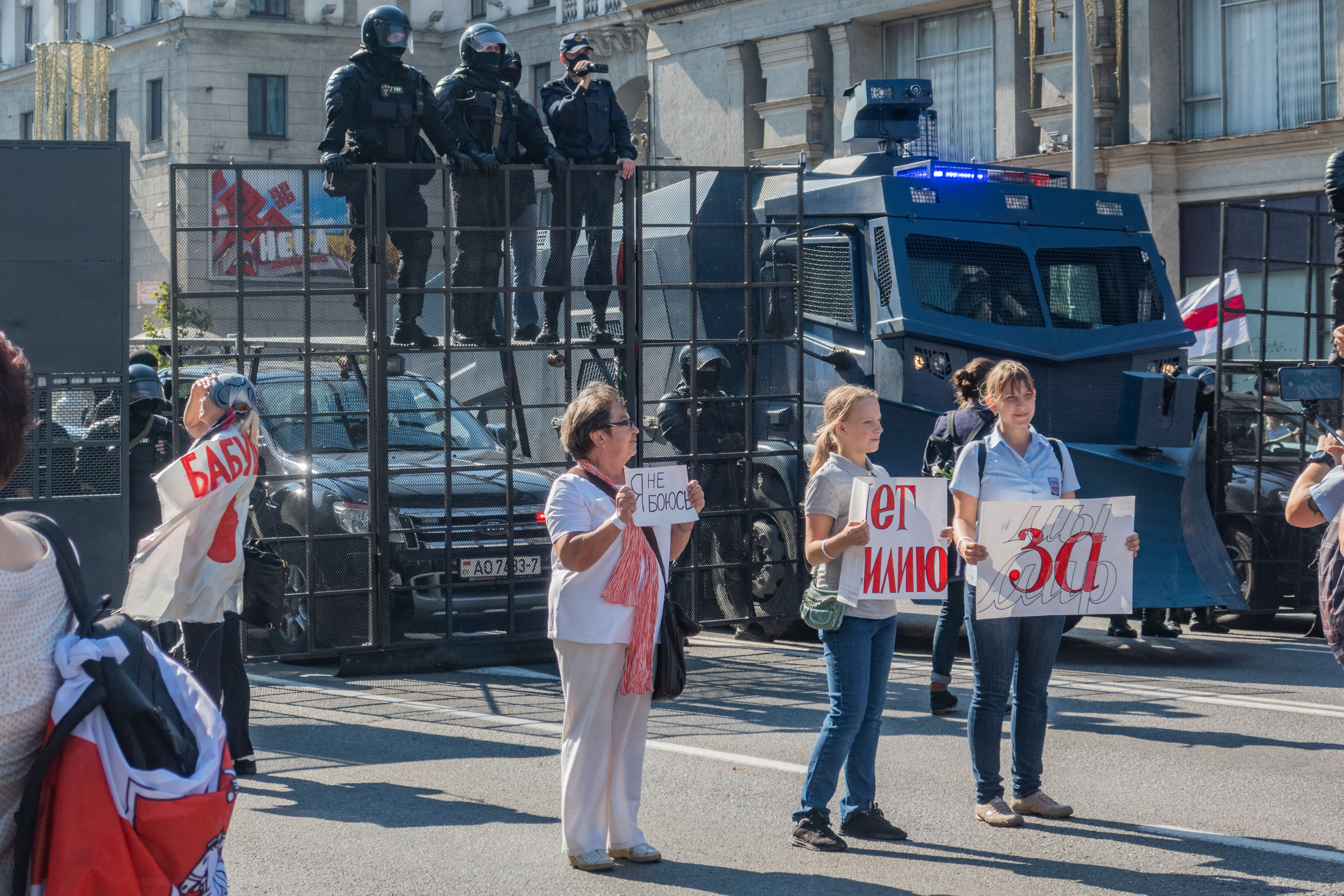
Special vehicles of the internal troops or AMAP/OMON: moving two-level fences and water cannons with dozer blades

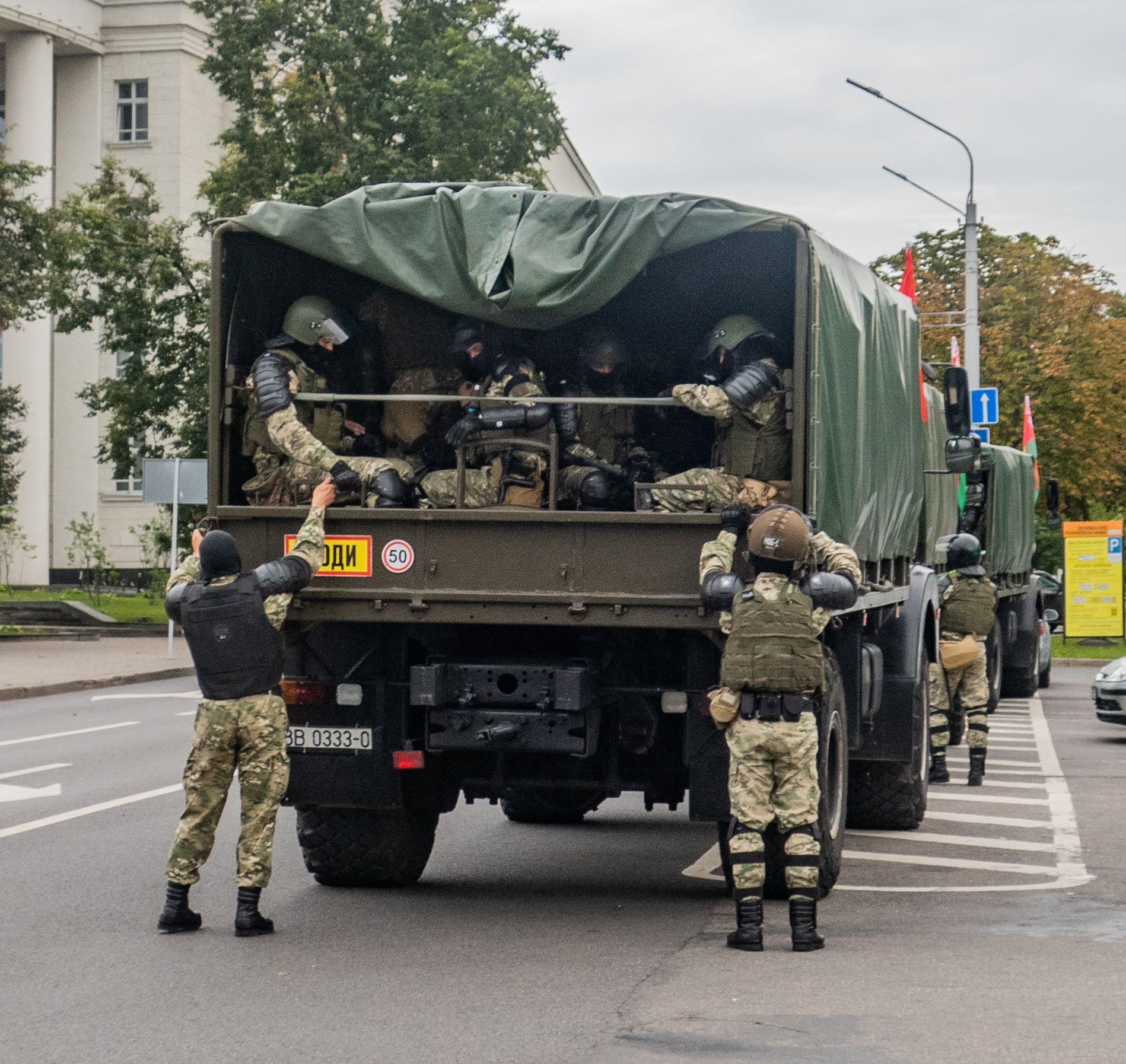
Internal troopers getting into the truck

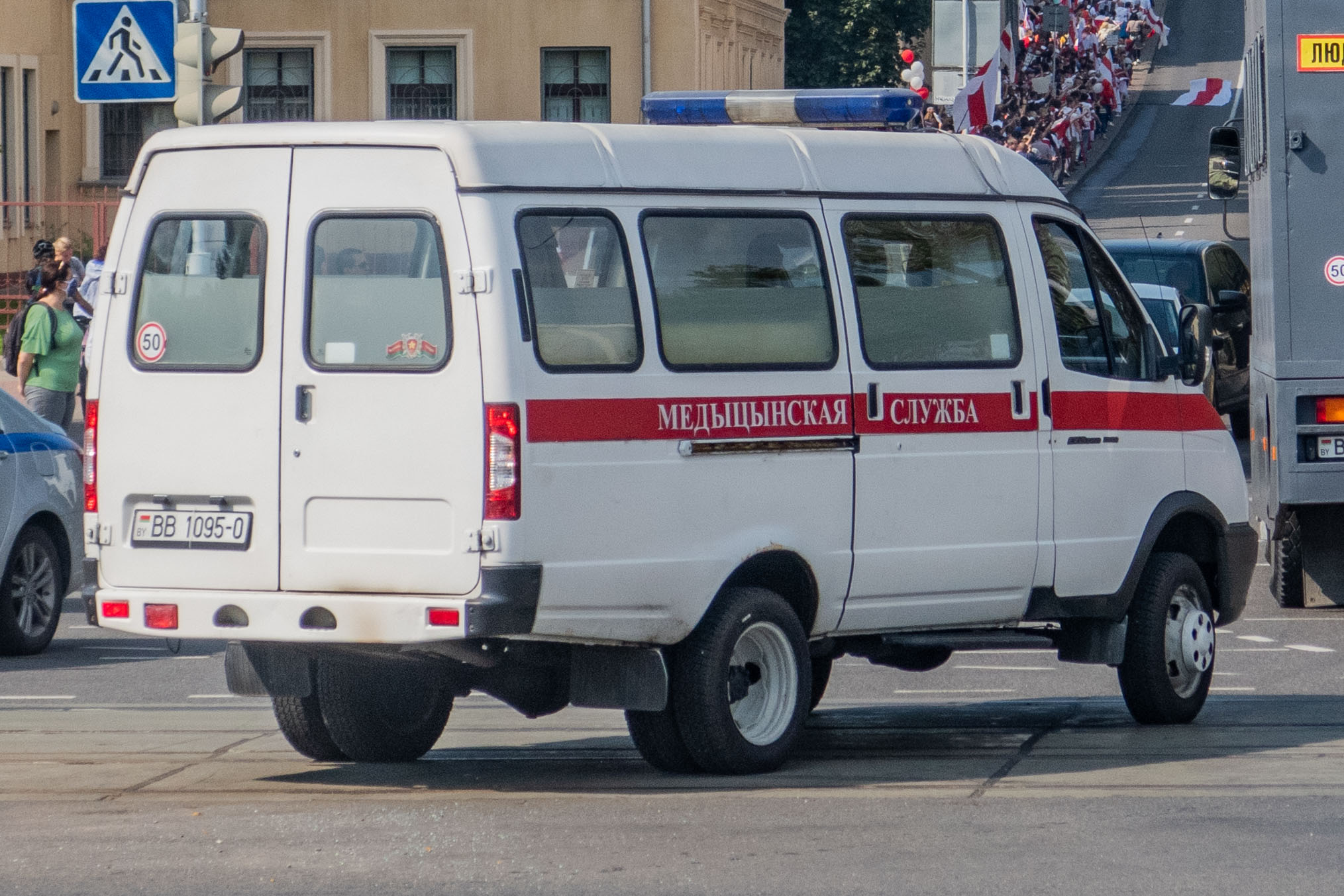
An ambulance-looking van with the registration plate of the Internal troops (BB-0)

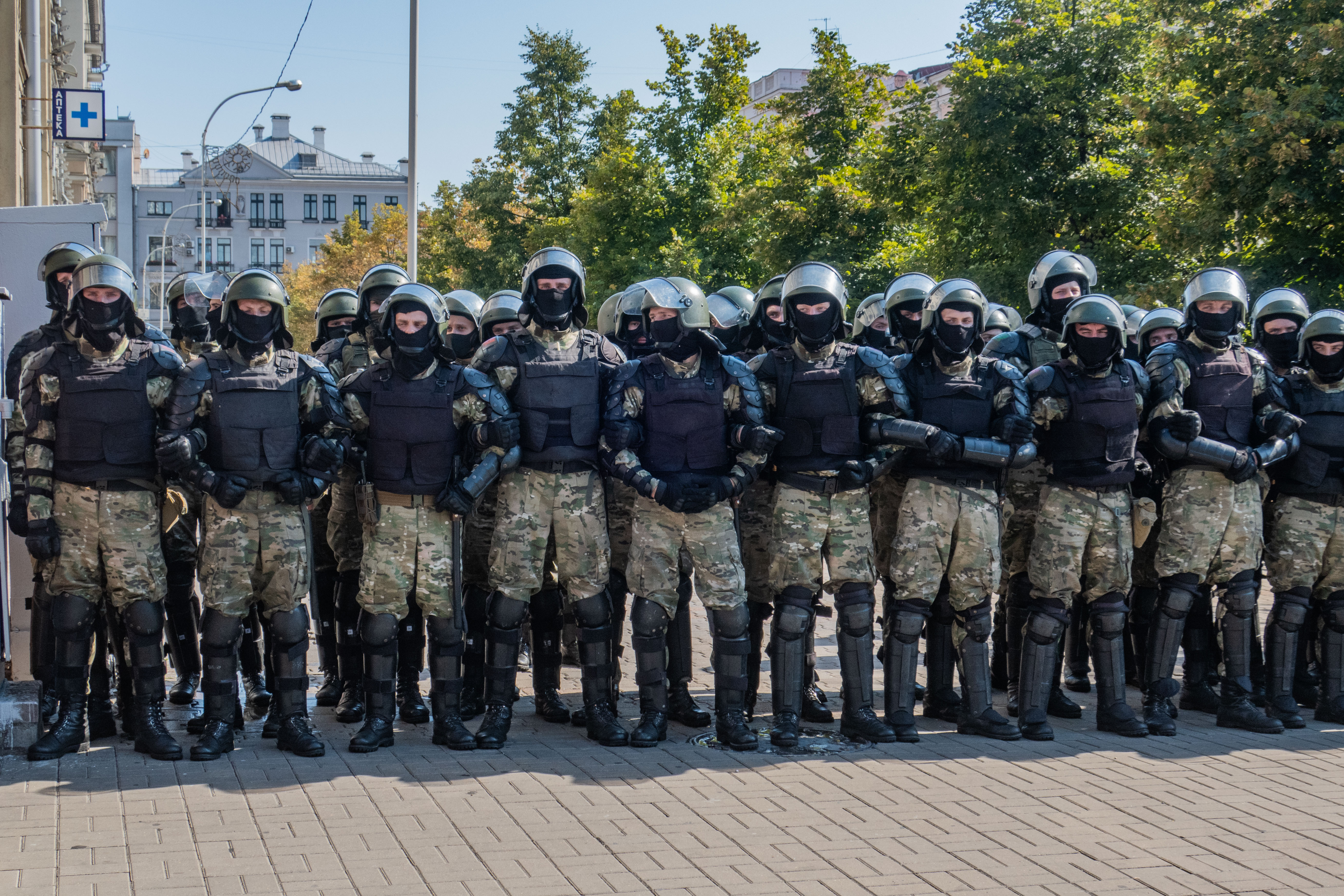
Internal troopers in Minsk

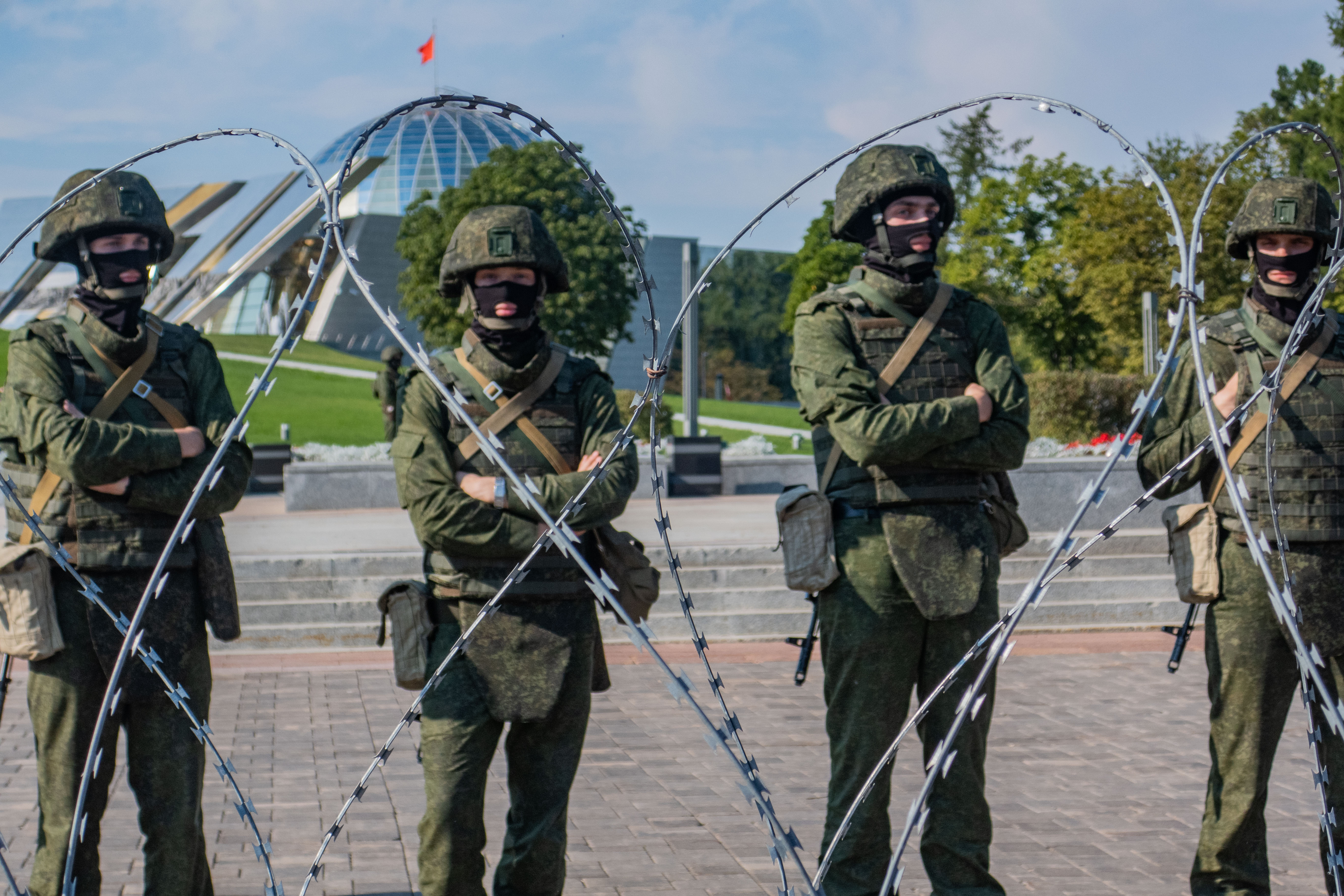
Soldiers of the Belarusian ground forces during the protests

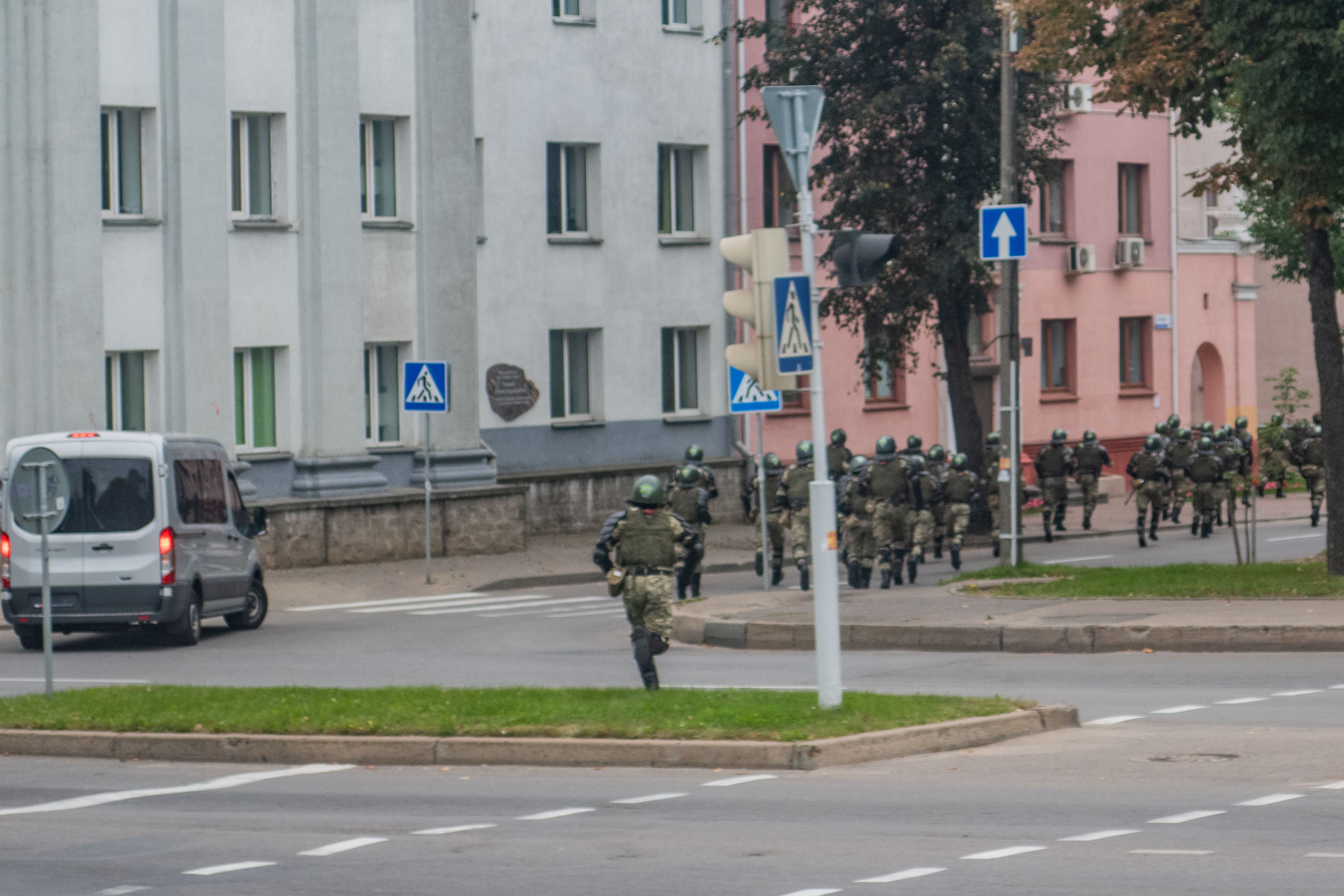
Running internal troopers in Minsk. Note the van with darkened glasses and without the registration plate: such vans are reported to be used by the government forces to bring reinforcements and detain people

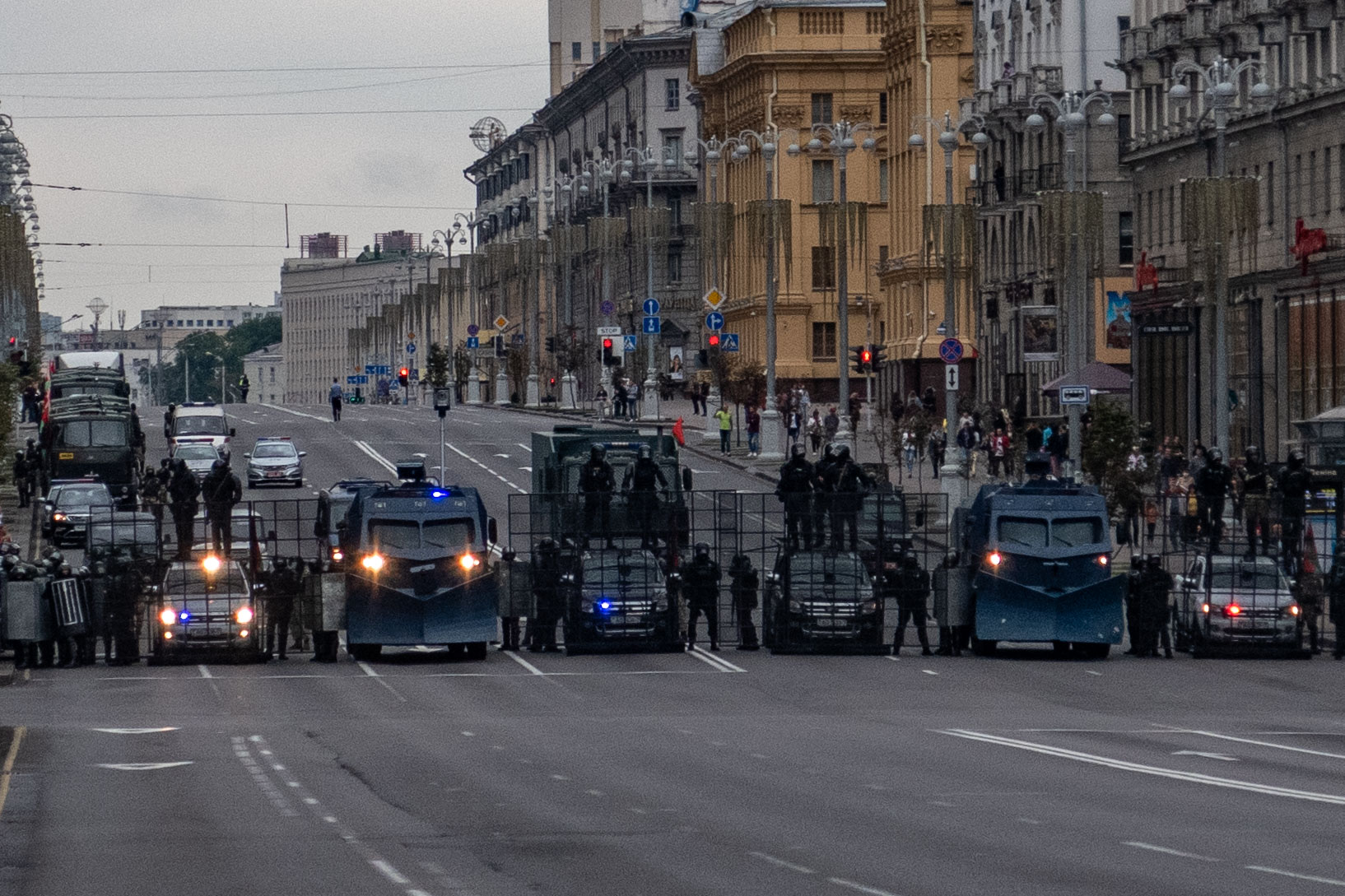
Independence avenue (Minsk), blocked by the special vehicles: moving two-level fences and water cannons with dozer blades

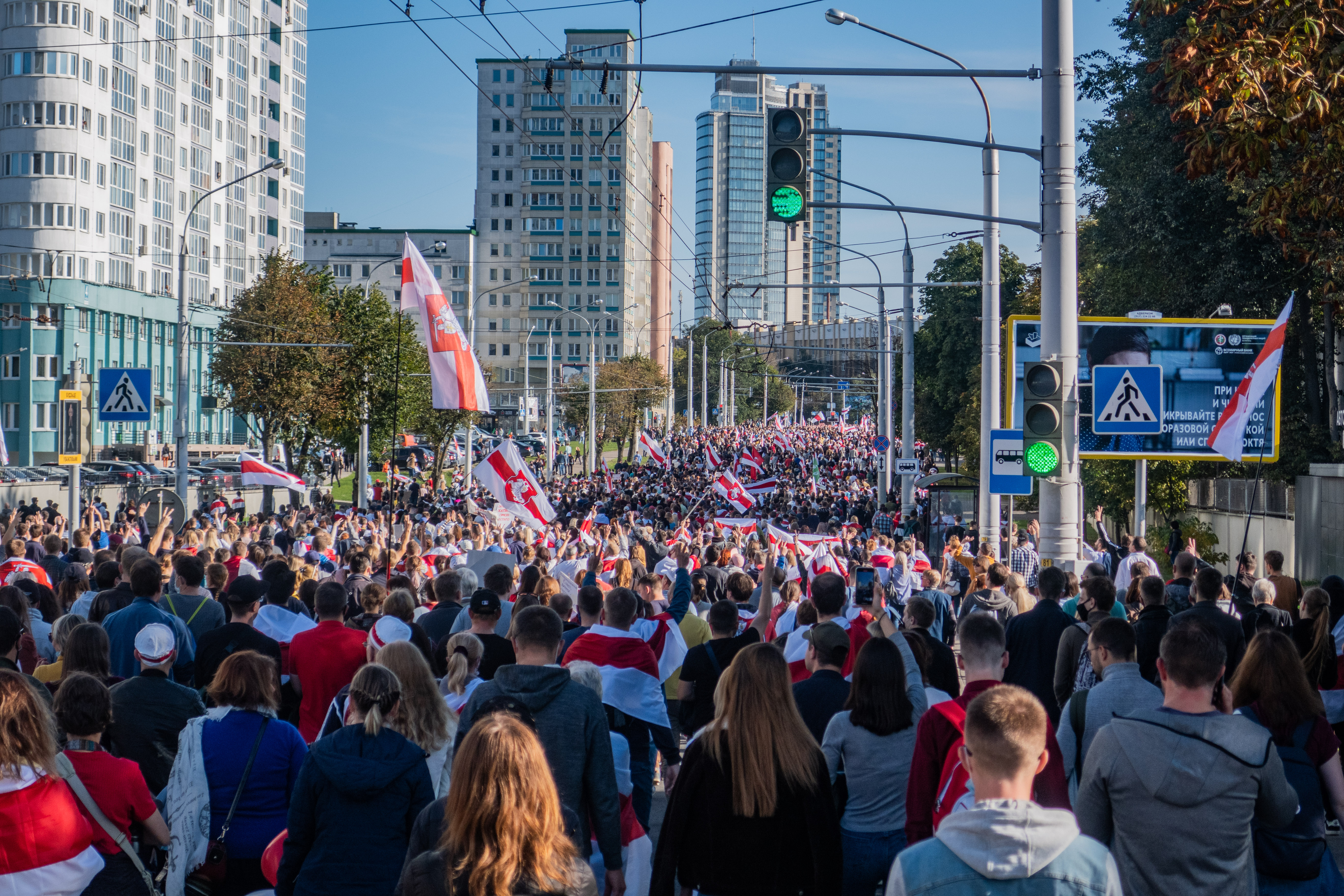
"March of justice". Minsk, 20 September

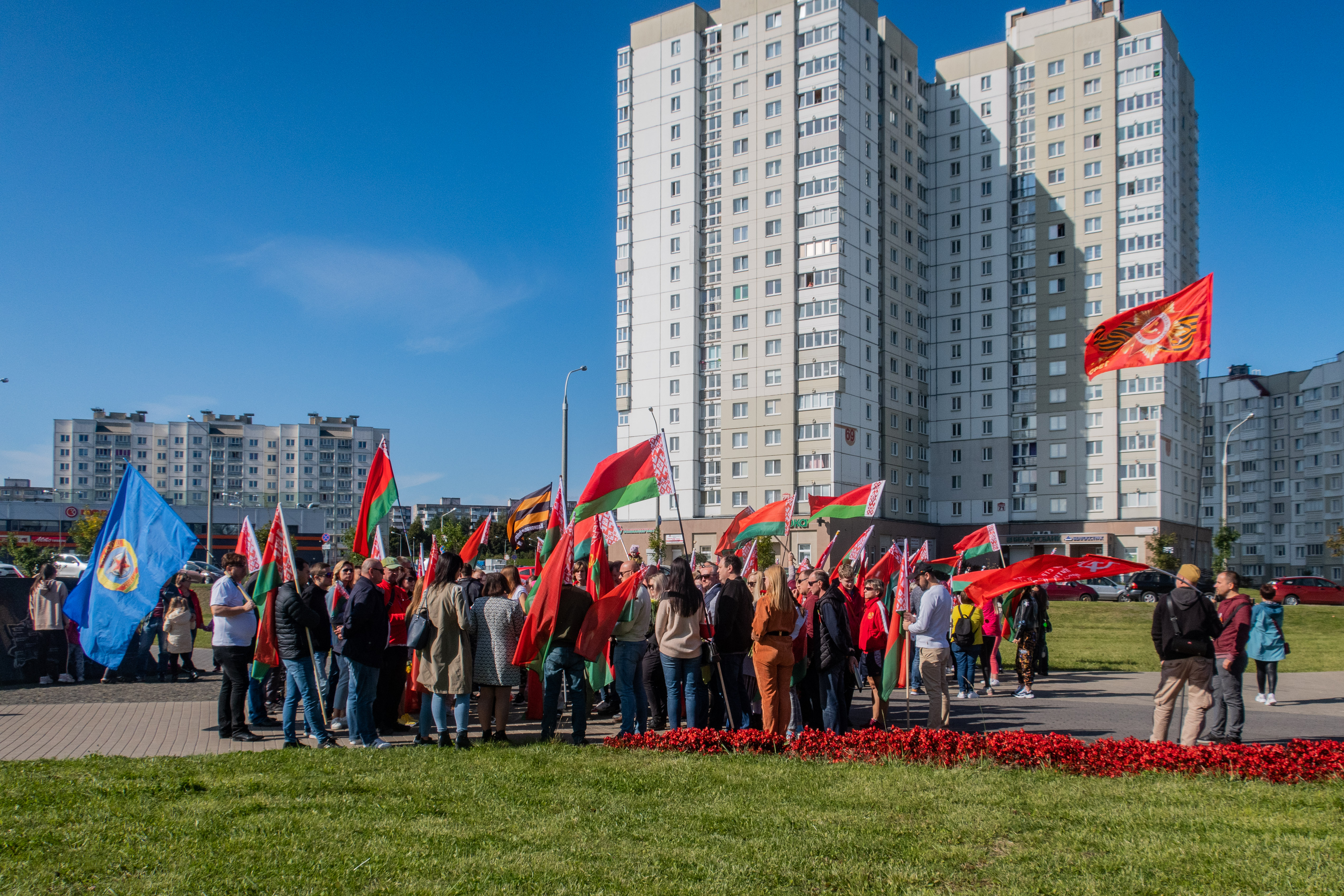
Pro-Lukashenko rally. Note the orange-black pro-Putin NOD flag. Minsk, 20 September

Government forces slowly cut the protesting crowd a few minutes before the suppression began. Minsk, 20 September

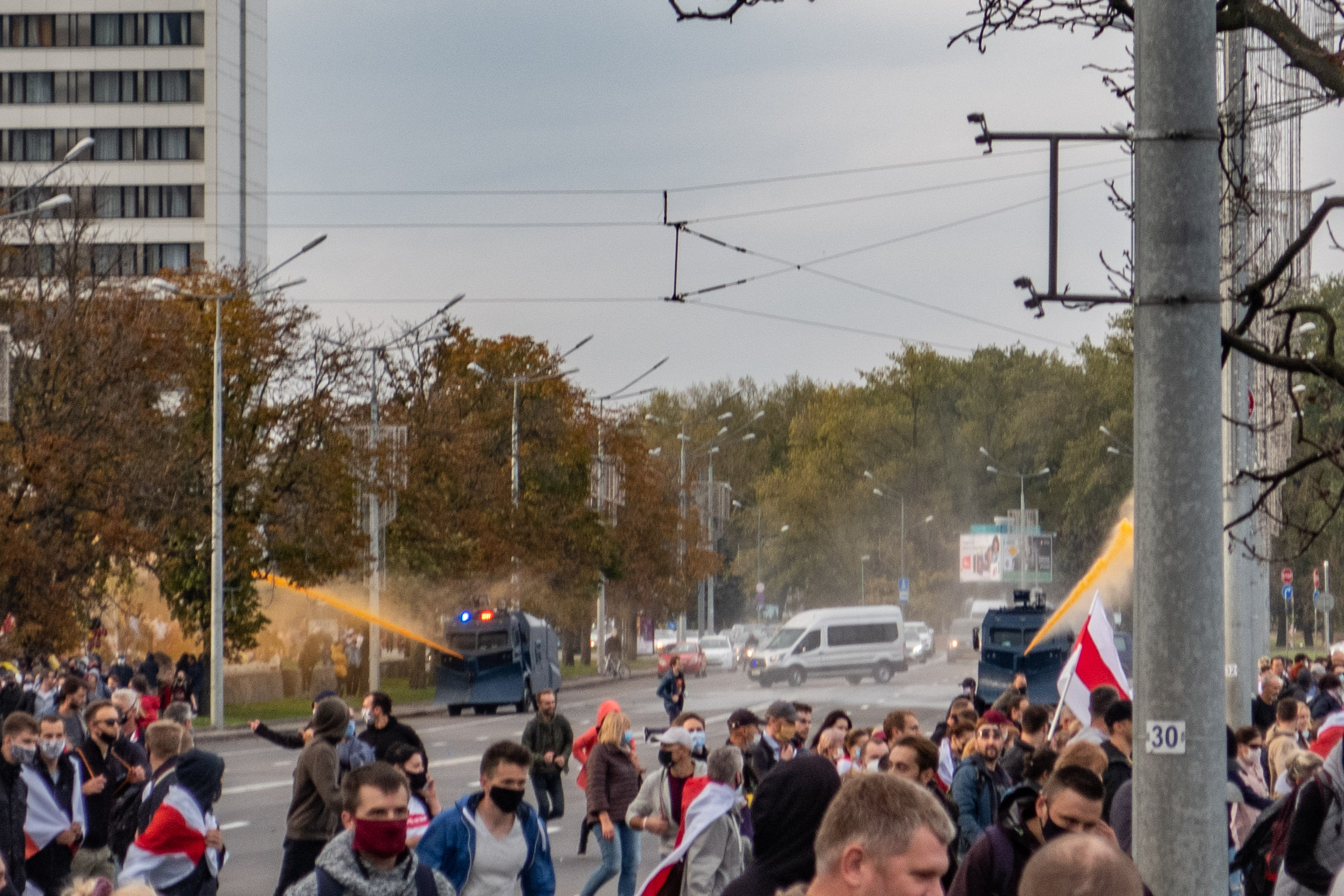
Use of water cannons in Minsk, 4 October. Note the orange colour of the water: it makes visible traces on clothes

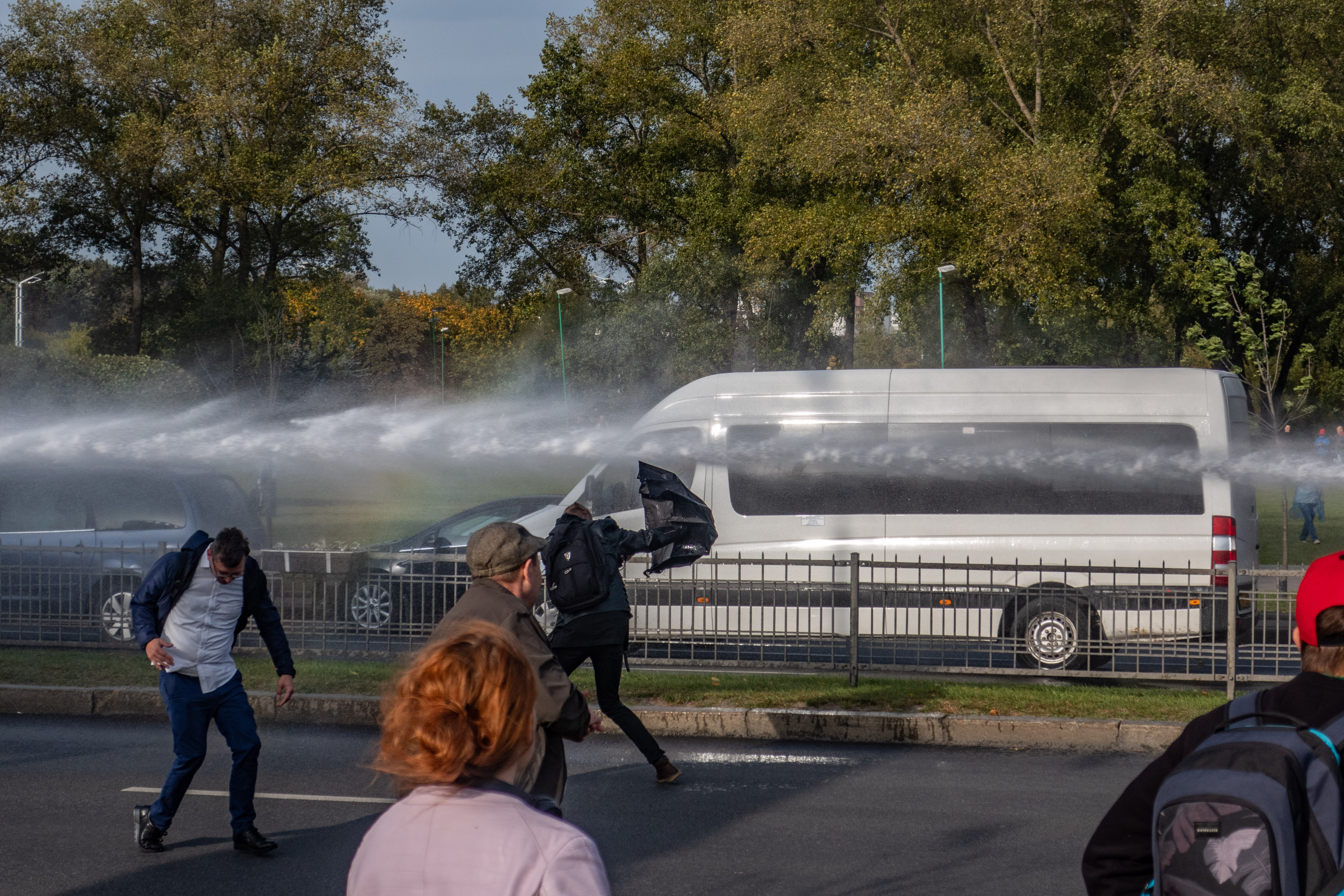
Use of water cannons in Minsk, 4 October (water in this water cannon was without dye)

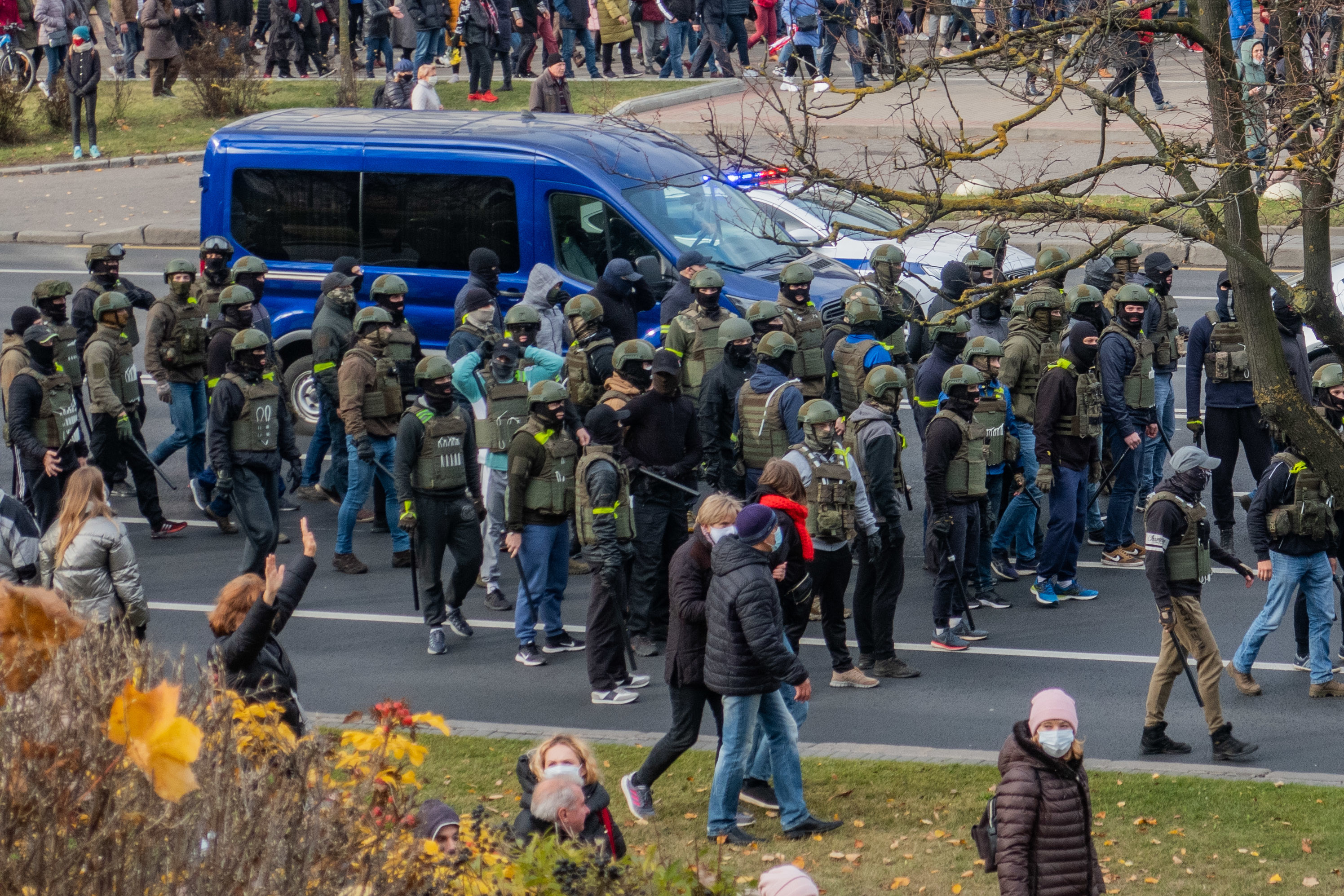
A group of armed troopers in casual clothes

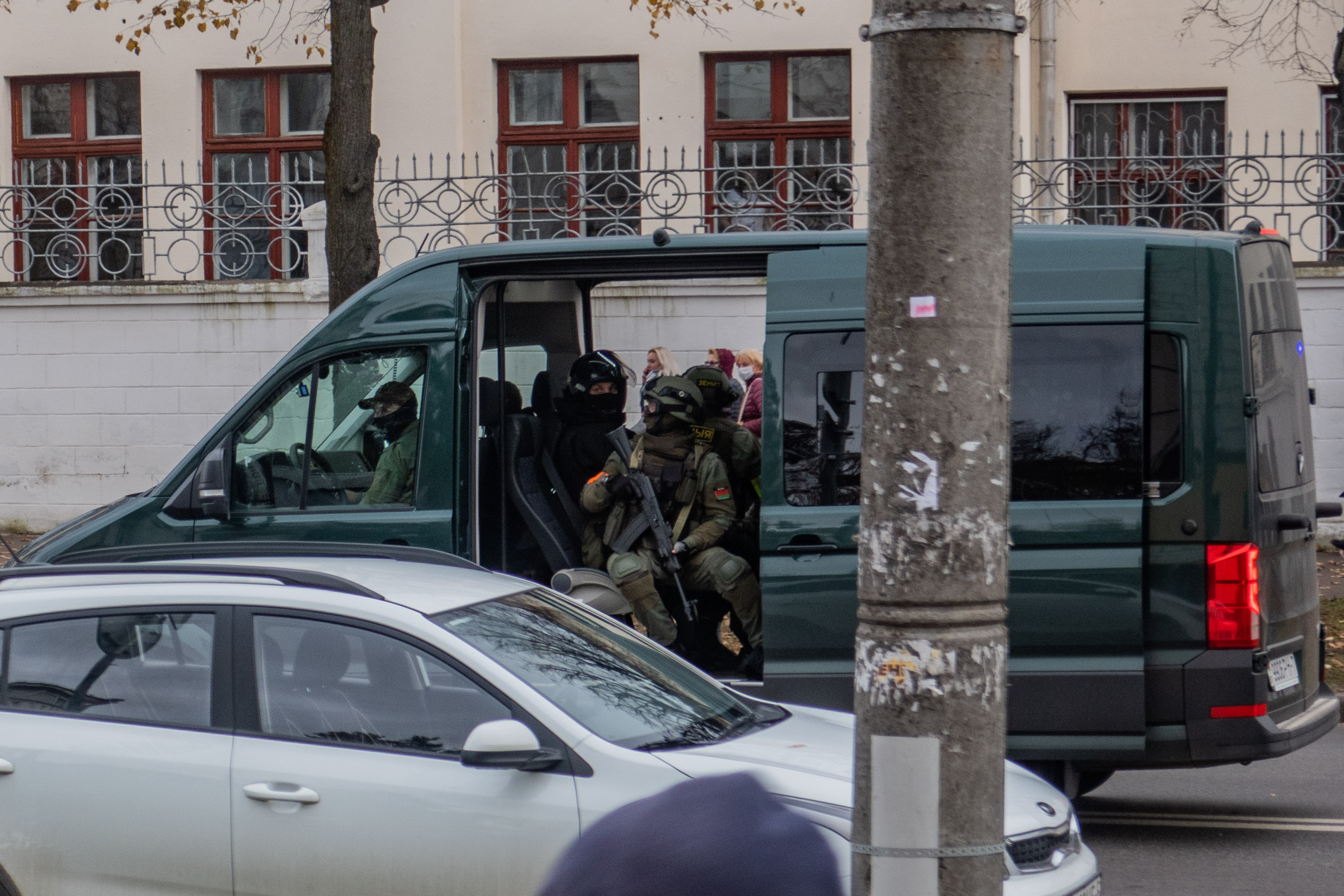
A minivan with armed troopers

Shooting in the air

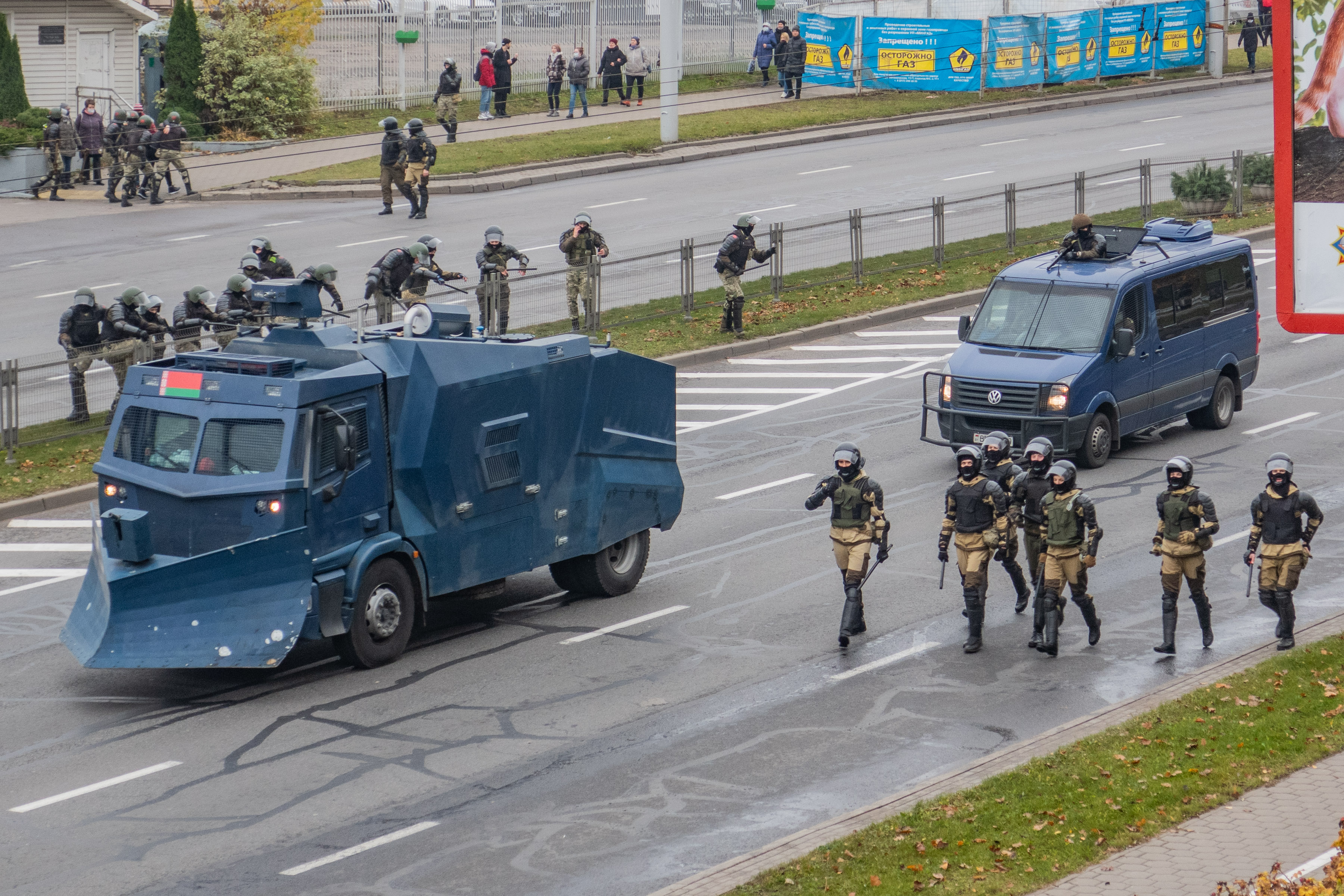
Approaching internal troopers supported by water cannon and assault van with a gunner. Minsk, 15 November

== See also ==
- List of deaths related to the 2020–2021 Belarusian protests
- 2017 Belarusian protests
- 2011 Belarusian protests
- 1996 Belarusian protests
- 1991 Belarusian Revolution
- 2022 Kazakh protests
- 2021 Russian protests
- Belarusian partisan movement
- 2020 United States presidential election
- Attempts to overturn the 2020 United States presidential election
