= List of political parties in Belarus =

This article lists political parties in Belarus.

== Officially registered parties ==
According to the "press service of the president of Belarus" only four parties are officially registered:

Name	Abbr.	Founded	Leader	Ideology	Representatives	Councilors	Locals	Political position	Alliances
Belaya Rus; Белая Русь	BR; БР	2007	Oleg Romanov	State nationalism; Conservative socialism; Pro-Lukashenko	51 / 110	16 / 64	3,234 / 12,514	Centre	RKSKPPGA
Republican Party of Labour and Justice; Республиканская партия труда и справедливости Рэспубліканская партыя працы і справядлівасьці	RPTS; РПТС; РППС	1993	Alexander Stepanov	Socialism; Pro-Lukashenko	8 / 110	0 / 64	186 / 12,514	Centre-left	RKSKPPGA; FSS CIS
Communist Party of Belarus; Коммунистическая партия Беларуси; Камуністычная партыя Беларусі	CPB; КПБ	1996	Aliaksiej Sokal	Communism; Marxism–Leninism; Soviet patriotism; Belarusian–Russian unionism	7 / 110	1 / 64	307 / 12,514	Far-left	RKSKPPGA; UCP–CPSU; IMCWP
Liberal Democratic Party of Belarus; Либерально-демократическая партия Беларуси; Ліберальна-дэмакратычная партыя Беларусі	LDPB; ЛДПБ	1994	Oleg Gaidukevich	Belarusian–Russian unionism	4 / 110	1 / 64	0 / 12,514	Right-wing	LDPR

== Parties that have never been registered ==
Name	Abbr.	Leader (s)	Ideology	Political position	Founded	Alliances
National Bolshevik Party of Belarus; Национал-большевистская партия Беларуси; Нацыянал-бальшавіцкая партыя Беларусі	NBP RB; НБП РБ		National Bolshevism; Russian nationalism; Neo-Sovietism; Russian irredentism; Anti-Western sentiment; Belarusian–Russian unionism; Anti-Lukashenko	Syncretic; Fiscal: Far-left; Social: Far-right	1999	Regional: The Other Russia
Party of Freedom and Progress; Партыя свабоды і прагрэсу Партия свободы и прогресса	PFP; ПСП	Uładzimier Navasiad	Liberalism; Pro-Europeanism	Centre	2003	European: ALDE Party (observer)
Belarusian Christian Democracy; Беларуская хрысьціянская дэмакратыя Белорусская христианская демократия	BCD; БХД	Paval Sieviaryniec; Vital Rymasheuski; Hieorhij Dzmitruk; Olga Kovalkova	Christian democracy; Liberal conservatism; Social conservatism; Pro-Europeanism	Centre-right	1917 (historical) 2005 (current)	BNB; European: EPP (observer); International: IDU (observer)
Together; Разам; Вместе	Razam; Разам; Вместе	Maria Kalesnikava	Democratization; Anti-Lukashenko	Big tent	2020	Coordination Council

== Deregistered parties ==
Name	Abbr.	Leader (s)	Ideology	Political position	Years active	Alliances
BPF Party; Партыя БНФ; Партия БНФ	PBNF; ПБНФ	Ryhor Kastusioŭ	Belarusian nationalism Christian democracy Conservatism; Pro-Europeanism	Centre-right to right-wing	1993–2023	BNB, UDF; European: ECR Party; International: IDU
Conservative Christian Party – BPF; Кансерватыўна-хрысціянская партыя — БНФ; Консервативно-христианская партия — БНФ	CChP–BPF; КХП–БНФ	Zianon Pazniak	Belarusian nationalism National conservatism Social conservatism Christian right	Right-wing	1999–2023	
Belarusian Green Party; Беларуская партыя «Зялёныя» Белорусская партия «Зелёные»	BGP; БПЗ	Dźmitry Kučuk	Green politics Eco-socialism; Environmentalism; Anti-capitalism; Alter-globalism	Left-wing	1994–2023	BNB; European: EGP (associate); International: GG (associate)
Belarusian Left Party "A Just World"; Беларуская партыя левых «Справядлівы свет» Белорусская партия левых «Справедливый мир»	BPL; БПЛ	Sergey Kalyakin	Socialism; Anti-Lukashenko	Left-wing	1991–2023	National: UDF; European: PEL
Belarusian Patriotic Party; Белорусская патриотическая партия Беларуская патрыятычная партыя	BPP; БПП	Nikolai Ulakhovich	Socialism; Pro-Lukashenko	Left-wing	1994–2023	RKSKPPGA
Belarusian Social Democratic Assembly; Беларуская сацыял-дэмакратычная Грамада; Белорусская социал-демократическая Грамада	BSDA; БСДГ	Siarhiej Čeračań	Social democracy Civic nationalism Environmentalism; Pro-Europeanism	Centre-left	1991–2023	
Belarusian Social Democratic Party (People's Assembly); Беларуская сацыял-дэмакратычная партыя (Народная Грамада); Белорусская социал-демократическая партия (Народная Громада)	BSDP (People's Assembly); БСДП (НГ)	Mikola Statkevich	Social democracy Sustainable development Non-interventionism	Centre-left	1996–2005	International: PA, SI
Belarusian Social Democratic Party (Assembly); Беларуская сацыял-дэмакратычная партыя (Грамада); Белорусская социал-демократическая партия (Грамада)	BSDP (Assembly); БСДП (Грамада)	Ihar Barysaŭ	Social democracy Liberal democracy Pro-Europeanism	Centre-left	2005–2023	UDF; European: PES; International: PA (observer)
Belarusian Social Sporting Party; Белорусская социально-спортивная партия Беларуская сацыяльна-спартыўная партыя	BSSP; БССП	Vladimir Alexandrovich	Welfarism; Pro-Lukashenko; Russophilia	Centre-left	1994–2023	RKSKPPGA
Belarusian Women's Party "Nadzieja"; Беларуская партыя жанчын «Надзея» Белорусская партия женщин «Надзея»	BWP "Nadzieja"; БПЖ «Надзея»	Aliena Jaśkova	Women's rights Social democracy	Centre-left	1994–2007	UDF; European: International: PA
Republican Party; Республиканская партия Рэспубліканская партыя	RP; РП	Uladzimir Belazor	Eurasianism; Pro-Lukashenko	Centre (official)	1994–2023	RKSKPPGA
Social Democratic Party of Popular Accord; Социал-демократическая партия народного согласия Сацыял-дэмакратычная партыя Народнай Згоды	SDPPA; СДПНС; СДПНЗ	Sergey Yermak	Social democracy Pro-Lukashenko	Centre-left	1997–2023	RKSKPPGA
United Civic Party; Аб'яднаная грамадзянская партыя Объединённая гражданская партия	UCP; АГП; ОГП	Mikalaj Kazloŭ	Liberal conservatism Economic liberalism Pro-Europeanism	Centre-right	1995–2023	UDF; European: EPP (observer); International: IDU

== Political movements ==
Name	Abbr.	Leader(s)	Ideology	Political position	Founded	Alliances
Belarusian Students' Association; Задзіночанне беларускіх студэнтаў	BSA; БРСМ		Youth rights		1988	ESU
Belarusian Republican Youth Union; Белорусский республиканский союз молодёжи Беларускi рэспубліканскі саюз моладзі	BRSM; БРСМ	Dmitry Voronyuk	Patriotism; Moral values; Pro-Lukashenko	Big tent	2002	RKSKPPGA
Legalize Belarus			Liberalism; Drug liberalization		2017	
Young Front; Малады фронт Молодой фронт	MF; МФ	Dzianis Urbanovič	Belarusian nationalism; Christian democracy	Centre-right to right-wing	1997	UDF; European: YEPP, EDS
Young Democrats; Маладыя дэмакраты Молодые демократы	MD; МД	Alaksandar Šumkievič	Christian democracy	Centre-right	1997	BNB; European: YEPP (observer); ECPYouth (observer)
Right Alliance; Правы альянс Правый альянс	PFP; ПСП	Juraś Karetnikaŭ	Conservatism; Traditionalism; Civic nationalism; Belarusian nationalism	Right-wing to far-right	2004	
Young Belarus; Маладая Беларусь; Молодая Беларусь	MB; МБ	Artur Fińkievič	Belarusian nationalism; Christian democracy; Conservatism	Centre-right to right-wing	2004	BNB
Youth Bloc; Моладзевы блок	MB; МБ		Classical liberalism	Center	2019	IFLRY (associate member)
Revolutionary Action; Рэвалюцыйнае дзеянне Революционное действие	RD; РД	Collective leadership	Anarcho-communism; Social anarchism; Insurrectionary anarchism; Illegalism; Platformism	Far-left	2005	Regional: AD
Movement "For Freedom"; Рух «За свабоду» Движение «За свободу»	Za svabodu За свабоду За свободу	Yury Gubarevič	Liberal democracy; Pro-Europeanism	Big tent	2006	UDF, BNB
Tell the Truth! Гавары праўду! Говори правду!	GP; ГП	Andrey Dmitriyeu; Tatsiana Karatkevich	Democratization; Anti-Lukashenko	Big tent	2010	

== Historical parties and movements (1991–present) ==
Name	Abbr.	Leader (s)	Ideology	Political position	Years active
Belarusian Popular Front "Revival"; Беларускі народны фронт «Адраджэньне» Белорусский народный фронт «Возрождение»	BPF; БНФ	Zianon Pazniak	Anti-communism; Belarusian nationalism National democracy	Centre-right	1989–1993 (successed by BPF Party and CChP–BPF)
United Democratic Party of Belarus; Аб'яднаная дэмакратычная партыя Беларусі; Объединённая демократическая партия Беларуси	UDPB; АДПБ; ОДПБ	Stanislaŭ Bahdankievič	Liberal conservatism	Centre-right	1990–1995 (merged into UCP)
Belarusian Peasant Party; Беларуская сялянская партыя Белорусская крестьянская партия	BPP; БСП; БКП	Jaŭhien Luhin	Agrarianism; Liberalism; Belarusian nationalism	Centre-right	1991–1999
Belarusian Christian Democratic Union; Беларуская хрысціянска-дэмакратычная злучнасць Белорусский христианско-демократический союз	BCDU; БХДЗ; БХДС	P. Silka	Christian democracy Belarusization	Centre-right	1991–?
Belarusian Party of Communists; Партыя камуністаў беларуская Партия коммунистов белорусская	PCB; ПКБ	Sergey Kalyakin	Communism; Marxism; Socialism	Left-wing to far-left	1991–2009 (rebranded into A Just World)
Slavic Council "Belaya Rus"; Славянскі сабор «Белая Русь» Славянский собор «Белая Русь»	SCBR; ССБР	Mikalaj Siarhiejeŭ; Valieryj Suriajeŭ; Michail Iĺin	Great Russian nationalism Russian irredentism Russophilia; Slavophilia; Pan-Slavism	Right-wing to far-right	1992–1999
People's Accord Party; Партыя народнай згоды Партия народного согласия	PAP; ПНЗ; ПНС	Hienadź Karpienka	Social democracy	Centre-left	1992–1996 (merged into SDPPA)
Belarusian Freedom Party; Беларуская партыя свабоды Белорусская партия свободы	BFP; БПС	Serhiy Visotskiy	Belarusian nationalism National conservatism Russophobia	Far-right	1992–2003 (successed by PA)
Belarusian Ecological Green Party; Беларуская экалягічная партыя зялёных Белорусская экологическая партия зеленых	BEGP; БЭПЗ	Mikalaj Kartaš	Green politics	Centre-left	1992–2007
Belarusian Agrarian Party; Белорусская аграрная партия Беларуская аграрная партыя	BAP; БАП	Mikhail Rusy	Agrarian socialism Pro-Lukashenko	Left-wing	1992–2023
Beer Lovers Party; Партыя аматараў піва Партия любителей пива	BLP; ПАП; ПЛП	Andrej Ramašeŭski	Joke party Liberalism	Centre-right	1993–1997
Polish Democratic Association; Польскае дэмакратычнае аб’яднанне Польское демократическое объединение Polskie Zjednoczenie Demokratyczne	PZD; ПДА; ПДО	Edward Ochrem; Konstanty Tarasiewicz	Polish minority interests Christian democracy	Centre-right	1993–1995
Belarusian Labour Party; Беларуская партыя працы Белорусская партия труда	BPT; БПП; БПТ	Aliaksandar Buchvostaŭ	Social democracy Labourism	Centre-left	1993–2009 (merged into BSDP)
Civic Party; Грамадзянская партыя Гражданская партия	GP; ГП	Jaroslav Romanchuk	Liberal conservatism	Centre-right	1994–1995 (merged into UCP)
Belarusian Popular Party; Беларуская народная партыя Белорусская народная партия	BPP; БНП	Victor Tereshchenko	Social liberalism	Centre	1994–1999
Belarusian Women's Party "Nadzieja"; Беларуская партыя жанчын «Надзея» Белорусская партия женщин «Надзея»	BWP "Nadzieja"; БПЖ «Надзея»	Aliena Jaśkova	Women's rights Social democracy	Centre-left	1994–2007 (officially deregistered)
Belarusian National Party; Беларуская нацыянальная партыя Белорусская национальная партия	BNP; БПНП	Anatoĺ Astapienka	Belarusian nationalism Christian conservatism	Right-wing	1994–1999
Belarusian Party "Green Peace"; Беларуская партыя «Зялёны мір» Белорусская партия «Зелёный мир»	BPGP; БПЗМ	Anatoĺ Astapienka	Green politics Pacifism	Centre-left	1994–1999
Belarusian Christian Democratic Party; Беларуская хрысціянска-дэмакратычная партыя Белорусская христианско-демократическая партия	BCDP; БХДП	Mikalaj Krukoŭski	Christian democracy	Centre to centre-right	1994–1999
All-Belarusian Unity and Accord Party; Партыя ўсебеларускага адзінства і згоды Партия всебелорусского единства и согласия	PVES; ПЎАЗ; ПВЕС		Social liberalism	Centre	1994–1999
Christian Democratic Choice; Хрысціянска-дэмакратычны выбар Христианско-демократический выбор	CDV; ХДВ	Valieryj Saroka	Christian democracy	Centre	1995–1999
National Democratic Party of Belarusians; Нацыянальна-дэмакратычная партыя беларусаў Национально-демократическая партия белорусов	NDBP; НДПБ	Viktar Navumienka	Belarusian nationalism National democracy	Right-wing	1995–?
Belarusian Socialist Party; Беларуская сацыялістычная партыя Белорусская социалистическая партия	BSP; БСП	Michail Padhajny	Socialism; Democratic socialism	Left-wing	1995–1999
Belarusian Ecological Party; Беларуская экалягічная партыя Белорусская экологическая партия	BEP; БЭП	Michail Frydliand	Green politics Environmentalism	Centre-left	1995–1998 (merged into BEGP)
Belarusian Republican Party; Беларуская рэспубліканская партыя Белорусская республиканская партия	BRP; БРП	Valier Artyšeŭski	Liberalism; Belarusian nationalism	Centre-right	1995–1999
Belarusian Social Democratic Party (People's Assembly); Беларуская сацыял-дэмакратычная партыя (Народная Грамада); Белорусская социал-демократическая партия (Народная Громада)	BSDP (PA); БСДП (НГ)	Mikola Statkevich	Social democracy Sustainable development Non-interventionism	Centre-left	1996–2005 (officially deregistered, merged into BSDP)
Belarusian Resistance Movement "ZUBR"; Беларускі Рух Супраціву "ЗУБР"; Белорусское движение сопротивления "ЗУБР"	ZUBR; ЗУБР	Mikita Sasim; Jaŭhien Afnahieĺ	Nonviolent resistance Liberal democracy Pro-Europeanism	Catch-all	2001–2006
European Coalition Free Belarus; Еўрапейская кааліцыя «Свабодная Беларусь» Европейская коалиция «Свободная Беларусь»	ECFB; ЕКСБ	Andrej Sańnikaŭ	Liberal democracy Pro-Europeanism	Centre	2003–2005
People's Coalition 5 Plus; Народная каалица 5 Плюс; Народная коалиция 5 Плюс	5 Plus; 5 Плюс	Collective leadership	Big tent Pro-Europeanism	Catch-all	2004–2006 (merged into UDF)
Civil Alliance for Just and Fair Elections for a Better Life "Talaka"; Грамадзянскі альянс за справядлівыя і сумленныя выбары для лепшага жыцця «Талака» Гражданский альянс за справедливые и честные выборы для лучшей жизни «Талака»	Talaka; Талака	Collective leadership	Big tent Anti-Lukashenko; Pro-Europeanism	Catch-all	2013–2015

== Soviet parties (1918–1991) ==
=== CPB ===
Name		Abbr.	Leader (s)	Ideology	Political position	Years active
Sole legal party (before 1990)
	Communist Party of Byelorussia; Коммунистическая партия Белоруссии; Камуністычная партыя Беларусі	CPB; КПБ	Alexander Miasnikian (first); Anatoly Malofeyev (last)	Communism; Marxism–Leninism	Far-left	1918–1991 (succeeded by PCB)
(in Poland)	Communist Party of Western Belorussia; Камуністычная партыя Заходняй Беларусі; Komunistyczna Partia Zachodniej Białorusi	KPZB; КПЗБ	Joseph Loginovich; Stephan Mertens; Vera Kharuzhaya	Communism; Marxism–Leninism; National communism	Far-left	1923–1938
(in Poland)	Belarusian Peasants' and Workers' Union; Беларуская сялянска-работніцкая грамада Białoruska Włościańsko-Robotnicza Hromada	BPWU; БСРГ; BWRH	Branislaw Tarashkyevich	Belarusian separatism Socialism; Left-wing nationalism Agrarian socialism	Left-wing	1925–1927

=== Clandestine parties ===
Name	Abbr.	Leader (s)	Ideology	Political position	Years active
Belarusian Party of Socialist Revolutionaries; Беларуская партыя сацыялістаў-рэвалюцыянераў Белорусская партия социалистов-революционеров	BPS-R; БПС-Р	Paluta Badunova	Neo-Narodism; Agrarian socialism Revolutionary socialism	Left-wing	1918–1924
Belarusian National Socialist Party; Беларуская нацыянал-сацыялістычная партыя Белорусская национал-социалистическая партия	BNSP; БНСП	Fabijan Akinčyc	Belarusian nationalism Nazism; Antisemitism; Anti-communism	Far-right	1933–1943
Belarusian Independence Party; Беларуская незалежніцкая партыя Белорусская независимая партия	BNP; БНП	Vincent Hadleŭski; Mikalaj Ščors	Belarusian nationalism Fascism; Nazism; Anti-communism	Far-right	1939/42–1950s
Belarusian Popular Front "Adradžeńnie"; Беларускі народны фронт «Адраджэньне» Белорусский народный фронт «Возрождение»	BPF; БНФ	Zianon Pazniak	Anti-communism; Belarusian nationalism National democracy	Centre-right	1989–1993 legalized in 1990

== Independence parties (1917–1918) ==
Name	Abbr.	Leader (s)	Ideology	Political position	Years active
General Jewish Labour Bund in Lithuania, Poland and Russia; Усеагульны яўрэйскі рабочы саюз у Літве, Польшчы і Расіі אַלגעמײנער ײדישער אַרבעטער־בונד אין ליטע, פּױלן און רוסלאַנד	Bund; Бунд בונד	Victor Alter	Bundism; Socialism; Jewish Autonomism; Non-Zionism; Secularism	Left-wing	1897–1921
Belarusian Socialist Assembly; Беларуская сацыялістычная грамада Белорусская социалистическая грамада	BSA; БСГ	Anton Luckievich; Ivan Luckievič; Alaiza Pashkevich	Neo-Narodism; Belarusian nationalism; Agrarian socialism; Left-wing nationalism	Left-wing	1902–1918

== See also ==
- List of political parties by country
- Politics of Belarus
