= List of right-wing political parties =

The following is a list of right-wing political parties. It includes parties from the centre-right to the far-right and ultra right.

== Active ==
=== A ===
Abkhazia

Logo	Name	Abbr.	Leader	Founded	Position	Ideology	Legislature	Notes
	Forum for the National Unity of Abkhazia	FNUA	Daur Ashba	February 8, 2005	Right-wing	Nationalism	People's Assembly: 0 / 35	
	United Abkhazia		Sergei Shamba	March 25, 2004	Centre-right	Social conservatism Republicanism	People's Assembly: 0 / 35	
	Ainar		Tengiz Jopua	2010	Right-wing	Direct democracy	People's Assembly: 0 / 35	

Afghanistan

All parties in Afghanistan are officially banned. The following parties operate either underground or in exile.

Logo	Name	Abbr.	Leader	Founded	Position	Ideology	Notes
	Islamic Dawah Organization of Afghanistan		Abdul Rasul Sayyaf	2005	Right-wing	Islamism; Pashtun interests Tajik interests	
	National Islamic Front of Afghanistan			1979	Right-wing	Afghan nationalism Pashtun interests Royalism	

Åland Islands

Logo	Name	Abbr.	Leader	Founded	Position	Ideology	Legislature	Notes
	Non-aligned Coalition	ObS	Marcus Måtar	1987	Centre-right	Conservatism; Regionalism; Euroscepticism Ålandic independence	Lagting: 5 / 30	
	Moderate Coalition for Åland	MS	Wille Valve	2015	Centre-right	Liberal conservatism	Lagting: 4 / 30	
	Ålandic Democracy	ÅD	Stephan Toivonen		Right-wing	National conservatism Anti-immigration; Right-wing populism	Lagting: 0 / 30	
	Future of Åland		Pia Eriksson	2001	Centre to centre-right	Liberalism; Ålandic independence Souverainism; Cultural conservatism Pacificism	Lagting: 0 / 30	

Albania

Logo	Name	Abbr.	Leader	Founded	Position	Ideology	Legislature	Notes
	Democratic Party of Albania	PD or PDSH	Sali Berisha	December 12, 1990	Centre-right	Conservatism; Liberal conservatism Pro-Europeanism	Kuvendi: 41 / 140	
	Opportunity Party	PM	Agron Shehaj	June 1, 2024	Centre-right to right-wing	Conservatism Economic liberalism Pro-Europeanism Anti-corruption	Kuvendi: 2 / 140	
	Republican Party of Albania	PR or PRSH	Fatimir Mediu	January 10, 1990	Right-wing	National conservatism	Kuvendi: 1 / 140	
	Legality Movement Party	PLL	Shpëtim Axhami	November 24, 1962	Right-wing	Monarchism; Social conservatism	Kuvendi: 1 / 140	
	Party for Justice, Integration and Unity	PDIU	Shpëtim Idrizi	March 1, 2011	Right-wing	Cham issue	Kuvendi: 1 / 140	
	Albania Becomes Movement	LSHB	Adriatik Lapaj	September 18, 2023	Centre to centre-right	Direct democracy Anti-corruption Civic nationalism Pro-Europeanism	Kuvendi: 1 / 140	
	Euroatlantic Democrats	DEA or KEA	Lulzim Basha	June 14, 2024	Centre-right	Liberal conservatism Pro-Europeanism Atlanticism Anti-corruption	Kuvendi: 0 / 140	
	Movement for National Development	LZHK	Dashamir Shehi	2004	Centre-right	Monarchism	Kuvendi: 0 / 140	
	New Democratic Spirit	FRD	Sali Shehu	April 30, 2012	Centre-right	Liberal conservatism Pro-Europeanism	Kuvendi: 0 / 140	
	Christian Democratic Party of Albania		Dhimiter Muslia	2013	Centre-right	Christian democracy Conservatism	Kuvendi: 0 / 140	
	Macedonian Alliance for European Integration (Macedonian Party)		Vasil Sterjovski	October 30, 2004	Centre-right to right-wing	Regionalism; Conservatism; Macedonian minority interests	Kuvendi: 0 / 140	
	National Unity Party		Idajet Beqiri	1991	Far-right	Albanian nationalism	Kuvendi: 0 / 140	
	Albanian National Front Party	PBK	Adriatik Alimadhi	December 23, 1989	Far-right	Albanian irredentism Albanian nationalism Anti-communism; National conservatism Right-wing populism Social conservatism	Kuvendi: 0 / 140	
	Demochristian Party of Albania	PDK	Nard Ndoka	December 11, 1991	Centre-right	Christian democracy Christian people's interests	Kuvendi: 0 / 140	
	Party of the Vlachs of Albania	PVSH	Edmond Petraj	October 28, 2011	Centre-right	Aromanian interests Pro-Europeanism	Kuvendi: 0 / 140	
	Red and Black Alliance	AK	Lumturi Ratkoceri	March 20, 2012	Far-right	Albanian nationalism Greater Albania	Kuvendi: 0 / 140	
	Challenge for Albania	SFIDA!	Hektor Ruci	2016	Centre to centre-right	Populism; Direct democracy	Kuvendi: 0 / 140	
	Djathas 1912	DJATHAS	Enkelejd Alibeaj	October 12, 2024	Centre-right	Liberal conservatism Pro-Europeanism	Kuvendi: 0 / 140	

Algeria

Logo	Name	Abbr.	Leader	Founded	Position	Ideology	Notes
	Algerian National Front	FNA	Moussa Touati	1990s	Right-wing	National conservatism	
	Hizb ut-Tahrir	HT	Ata Abu Rashta	1953		Pan-Islamism; Islamism; Muslim supremacism Caliphalism; Salafism; Jihadism; Desecularization; Anti-Western sentiment Anti-nationalism; Antisemitism; Anti-Zionism; Anti-democracy; Anti-liberalism; Anti-capitalism; Anti-communism	Banned
	Islamic Renaissance Movement	MRI	Mohammed Dhouibi	1990	Centre-right, Right-wing	Conservative democracy Islamic democracy	
	Justice and Development Front		Abdallah Djaballah	2011	Right-wing	Islamic democracy Algerian nationalism	
	Movement for National Reform		Filali Ghouini	1999	Right-wing	Islamism; Islamic democracy	
	Movement of Society for Peace	MSP	Abderrazak Makri	6 December 1990		Sunni Islamism; Islamic democracy Social conservatism Pan-Islamism; Economic liberalism Anti-Zionism	
	National Construction Movement	Binaa	Abdelkader Bengrina	March 2013		Islamic democracy Algerian nationalism	

Andorra

Logo	Name	Abbr.	Leader	Founded	Position	Ideology	Notes
	Democrats for Andorra	DA	Xavier Espot Zamora	February 22, 2011	Centre-right	Liberal conservatism Civic nationalism	
	Lauredian Union			2001	Centre-right	Conservatism; Localism	
	Liberal Party of Andorra	L'A	Cristina Rico	1992	Centre-right	Conservative liberalism Pro-Europeanism	
	Third Way	TV	Josep Pintat Forné	2018	Centre-right to right-wing	Conservatism; Souverainism	

Angola

- National Liberation Front of Angola
- UNITA

Anguilla

- Anguilla Progressive Party

Argentina

- Civic Front of Córdoba
- Conservative People's Party
- Democratic Party
- Federal Peronism
- Federal Popular Union
- Fuerza Republicana
- La Libertad Avanza
- Liberal Libertarian Party
- Libertarian Party
- Light Blue and White Union
- Patriot Front
- Republican Proposal
- Salta Renewal Party
- UNIR Constitutional Nationalist Party
- Union of the Democratic Centre

Armenia

- Adequate Party
- Christian-Democratic Rebirth Party (Shirinyan-Babajanyan Alliance of Democrats)
- Conservative Party (Free Homeland Alliance)
- Constitutional Rights Union
- Hosank
- I Have Honor Alliance
  - Homeland Party
  - Republican Party of Armenia
- Mighty Fatherland
- National Agenda Party
- Orinats Yerkir
- People's Party
- Prosperous Armenia
- Ramgavar
- Sasna Tsrer Pan-Armenian Party (National Democratic Pole)
- United Liberal National Party

Aruba

- Aruban People's Party

Australia

- Australia First Party
- Australian Christians
- Australian Citizens Party
- Australian Federation Party
- Australian Protectionist Party
- Christian Democratic Party
- Civil Liberties & Motorists Party
- Coalition
  - Country Liberal Party
  - Liberal National Party of Queensland
  - Liberal Party of Australia
    - Liberal Party of Australia (A.C.T. Division)
    - Liberal Party of Australia (New South Wales Division)
    - Liberal Party of Australia (South Australian Division)
    - Liberal Party of Australia (Tasmanian Division)
    - Liberal Party of Australia (Victorian Division)
    - Liberal Party of Australia (Western Australian Division)
    - Young Liberals
  - National Party of Australia
    - National Party of Australia (SA)
    - National Party of Australia (WA)
    - National Party of Australia – NSW
    - National Party of Australia – Victoria
- Derryn Hinch's Justice Party
- Great Australia Party, The
- Katter's Australian Party
- Libertarian Party
- Love Australia or Leave
- North Queensland First
- Pauline Hanson's One Nation
- Shooters, Fishers and Farmers Party
- United Australia Party

Austria

- Alliance for the Future of Austria
- Austrian People's Party
- Black-Yellow Alliance
- Christian Party of Austria
- Freedom Party of Austria
- Free Party Salzburg
- Neutral Free Austria Federation
- Team HC Strache – Alliance for Austria
- Reform Conservatives, The

Azerbaijan

- Azerbaijan Democratic Enlightenment Party
- Azerbaijan Liberal Party
- Azerbaijani Popular Front Party
- Azerbaijan National Independence Party
- Civic Solidarity Party
- Democratic Reforms Party
- Great Order Party
- Motherland Party
- National Revival Movement Party
- New Azerbaijan Party

=== B ===
Bahamas

- Democratic National Alliance
- Free National Movement

Bahrain

- Al Asalah
- Hizb ut-Tahrir (Banned)

Bangladesh

- Bangladesh Jamaat-e-Islami
- Bangladesh Muslim League
- Bangladesh Tarikat Federation
- Islami Andolan Bangladesh
- National Democratic Party

Belarus

- Belarusian Christian Democracy
- BPF Party
- Conservative Christian Party – BPF
- Liberal Democratic Party of Belarus
- Right Alliance
- United Civic Party
- YCSU Young Democrats
- Young Belarus
- Young Front

Belgium

- Christian Democratic and Flemish
- DéFI
- Liberal Democrats
- Libertair, Direct, Democratisch
- National Force
- New Flemish Alliance
- Open Flemish Liberals and Democrats
- Partei für Freiheit und Fortschritt
- People's Party
- Reformist Movement
- Vlaams Belang
- VLOTT

Belize

- United Democratic Party

Bermuda

- Free Democratic Movement
- One Bermuda Alliance

Bhutan

- Druk Phuensum Tshogpa

Bolivia

- Bolivian Socialist Falange
- Christian Democratic Party
- Creemos
- Nationalist Democratic Action
- New Republican Force
- Revolutionary Nationalist Movement
- Solidarity Civic Unity

Bosnia and Herzegovina

- Bosnian Movement of National Pride
- Bosnian-Herzegovinian Patriotic Party
- Croatian Democratic Union 1990
- Croatian Democratic Union of Bosnia and Herzegovina
- Croatian Party of Rights of Bosnia and Herzegovina
- Croatian Peasant Party of Bosnia and Herzegovina
- Democratic People's Alliance
- Democratic Union
- Liberal Democratic Party
- National Democratic Movement
- Party of Croatian Right
- Party of Democratic Action
- Party of Democratic Progress
- Party of Justice and Trust
- People and Justice
- Serb Democratic Party
- Union for a Better Future of BiH
- United Srpska

Brazil

- Brazilian Labour Renewal Party
- Brazilian Woman's Party
- Brazil Union
- Christian Democracy
- Democratic Renewal Party
- Liberal Party
- New Party
- Podemos
- Progressistas
- Republicans

Bulgaria

- Agrarian People's Union (Stand Up.BG! We are coming!)
- Attack
- Bulgaria for Citizens Movement (Stand Up.BG! We are coming!)
- Bulgarian Democratic Center
- Bulgarian National Union – New Democracy
- National Front for the Salvation of Bulgaria
- Union of Patriotic Forces and Militaries of the Reserve Defense
- Volya Movement
- Democratic Party
- Democrats for a Strong Bulgaria
- GERB
- George's Day Movement
- IMRO – Bulgarian National Movement
- Middle European Class
- National Democratic Party
- National Movement for the Salvation of the Fatherland
- Nationalist Party of Bulgaria
- Reformist Bloc
- Republicans for Bulgaria
- Revival
- Order, Law and Justice
- Union of Democratic Forces
- Union of Free Democrats
- United People's Party (Stand Up.BG! We are coming!)

Burkina Faso

- National Rebirth Party

Burundi

- National Council for the Defense of Democracy – Forces for the Defense of Democracy

=== C ===
Cambodia

- Cambodian Liberty Party
- FUNCINPEC
- Khmer Democratic Party
- Khmer National United Party
- Khmer Power Party
- Khmer Republican Party

Cameroon

- Cameroon People's Democratic Movement
- National Union for Democracy and Progress

Canada

- Alberta Advantage Party
- British Columbia Liberal Party
- British Columbia Libertarian Party
- British Columbia Party
- Buffalo Party of Saskatchewan
- Canadians' Choice Party
- Christian Heritage Party of Canada
  - Christian Heritage Party of British Columbia
- Coalition Avenir Québec
- Coalition Vancouver
- Conservative Party of British Columbia
- Conservative Party of Canada
- Conservative Party of Quebec
- Équipe Autonomiste
- Libertarian Party of Canada
- Manitoba First
- National Citizens Alliance
- Nationalist Party of Canada
- New Blue Party of Ontario
- Non-Partisan Association
- Ontario Alliance
- Ontario Party
- People's Alliance of New Brunswick
- People's Party of Canada
- Progressive Conservative Association of Nova Scotia
- Progressive Conservative Party of Manitoba
- Progressive Conservative Party of New Brunswick
- Progressive Conservative Party of Newfoundland and Labrador
- Progressive Conservative Party of Ontario
- Progressive Conservative Party of Prince Edward Island
- Progressive Conservative Party of Saskatchewan
- Quebec Liberal Party
- Reform Party of Alberta
- Reform Party of British Columbia
- Republican Party of Alberta
- Saskatchewan Party
- Trillium Party of Ontario
- United Conservative Party
- Vancouver 1st
- Western Canada Concept Party of British Columbia
- Wildrose Independence Party of Alberta
- Yukon Party

Cape Verde

- Democratic and Independent Cape Verdean Union

Central African Republic

- Movement for Democracy and Development

Chile

- Chile Vamos
  - Evópoli
  - Independent Democratic Union
  - National Renewal
- Christian Social Front
  - Christian Conservative Party
  - Republican Party
- National Citizen Party (United Independents)
- New Time
- Party of the People

China

- Democracy Party of China (Banned)
- National Democratic Party of Tibet (Banned)

Colombia

- Citizen Option
- Colombian Conservative Party
- Democratic Center
- Independent Movement of Absolute Renovation
- New Democratic Force
- Radical Change

Comoros

- National Front for Justice

Congo, Democratic Republic of the

- Forces for Renewal
- Movement for the Liberation of the Congo
- Union of Mobutist Democrats

Cook Islands

- Cook Islands Party
- One Cook Islands Movement

Costa Rica

- Accessibility without Exclusion
- Christian Democratic Alliance
- Costa Rican Renewal Party
- Liberal Progressive Party
- Libertarian Movement
- National Integration Party
- National Restoration Party
- New Generation Party
- New Republic Party
- Social Christian Republican Party
- Social Christian Unity Party

Croatia

- Alliance for Croatia
  - Croatian Dawn – Party of the People
  - Croatian Democratic Alliance of Slavonia and Baranja
  - Croatian Party of Rights
- Authentic Croatian Party of Rights
- Bloc for Croatia
- Bridge, The
- Croatian Christian Democratic Union
- Croatian Civic Party
- Croatian Demochristian Party
- Croatian Democratic Union
- Croatian Growth
- Croatian Party of Rights 1861
- Croatian Pure Party of Rights
- Croatian Republican Union
- Croatian Sovereignists
- Democratic Centre
- Democratic Party of Zagorje
- Homeland Movement
- Međimurje Party
- Only Croatia – Movement for Croatia
- Party of Danube Serbs

Cuba

- Cuban Liberal Union (Banned)

Curaçao

- Movement for the Future of Curaçao

Cyprus

- Democratic Rally
- ELAM
- Solidarity Movement

Czech Republic

- Alliance for the Future
- ANO 2011
- Civic Conservative Party
- Conservative Party
- Europe Together
- Freeholder Party of the Czech Republic
- Freedom and Direct Democracy
- Koruna Česká
- Motorists for Themselves
- National Democracy
- Oath Civic Movement
- Order of the Nation
- PRO Law Respect Expertise
- Rally for the Republic – Republican Party of Czechoslovakia
- Right Bloc
- Spolu
  - Civic Democratic Party
  - TOP 09
- Svobodní
- Tricolour
- United Democrats – Association of Independents
- Urza.cz

=== D ===
Denmark

- Conservative People's Party, The
- Danish People's Party
- Freedom List
- Hard Line
- Liberal Alliance
- National Socialist Movement of Denmark
- New Right
- Progress Party
- Venstre

Dominica

- Dominica Freedom Party
- People's Party of Dominica

Dominican Republic

- National Progressive Force
- National Unity Party
- Quisqueyano Christian Democratic Party
- Social Christian Reformist Party

=== E ===
East Timor

- Association of Timorese Heroes
- People's Party of Timor
- Timorese Democratic Union

Ecuador

- Coalition Movement
- Creating Opportunities
- Social Christian Party

Egypt

- Al-Nour Party
- Authenticity Party (Anti-Coup Alliance)
- For the Love of Egypt
  - Conservative Party
  - New Wafd Party
- Freedom and Justice Party (Anti-Coup Alliance)
- Hizb ut-Tahrir (Banned)
- Modern Egypt Party
- National Party of Egypt
- Nubian Nile Party
- Union Party
- Young Egypt Party

El Salvador

- Grand Alliance for National Unity
- National Coalition Party
- Nationalist Republican Alliance

Equatorial Guinea

- Popular Union of Equatorial Guinea
- Progress Party of Equatorial Guinea (Banned)

Eritrea

- Eritrean Islamic Jihad
- Eritrean Liberation Front

Estonia

- Conservative People's Party of Estonia
- Estonian Independence Party
- Isamaa

Eswatini

- Sive Siyinqaba National Movement

Ethiopia

- National Movement of Amhara

European Union

- European Christian Political Party
- European Conservatives and Reformists Party
- European People's Party
- Europe of Sovereign Nations
- Patriots.eu

=== F ===
Faroe Islands

- People's Party (The Conservative People's Party)
- Union Party (Venstre)

Fiji

- Social Democratic Liberal Party
- Unity Fiji Party

Finland

- Blue and White Front
- Blue Reform
- Blue-and-Black Movement
- Change 2011
- Christian Democrats
- Finnish People First
- Finns Party
- Movement Now
- National Coalition Party
- Power Belongs to the People

Flanders

- Libertair, Direct, Democratisch
- New Flemish Alliance
- Open Flemish Liberals and Democrats
- Vlaams Belang

France

- Action Française
- Agir (Ensemble Citoyens)
- Alliance Royale
- Comités Jeanne
- Debout la France
- Democratic European Force
- Ecology Generation
- Horizons (Ensemble Citoyens)
- La France Audacieuse
- League of the South
- Movement for France
- National Centre of Independents and Peasants
- National Rally
- National Republican Movement
- Party of France
- Patriots, The
- Rally for France
- Republicans, The
- Reconquête
- Rurality Movement
- VIA, the Way of the People

French Polynesia

- Tahoera'a Huiraatira

=== G ===
Gabon

- Gabonese Democratic Party

Gambia, The

- Alliance for Patriotic Reorientation and Construction

Georgia

- Alliance of Patriots of Georgia
- Christian-Democratic Movement
- Conservative Party of Georgia
- Conservatives for Georgia
- Democratic Movement – United Georgia
- Free Georgia
- Georgian March
- Girchi – More Freedom
- Industry Will Save Georgia
- Law and Justice
- National Democratic Party
- Party of The Free
- Republican Party of Georgia
- United National Movement

Germany

- Alliance C – Christians for Germany
- Alternative for Germany
- Bavaria Party
- CDU/CSU
  - Christian Democratic Union of Germany
  - Christian Social Union in Bavaria
- Centre Party
- Christian Centre
- Citizens in Rage
- Ecological Democratic Party
- Family Party of Germany
- Free Democratic Party
- Free Voters
- German Freedom Party
- German Party
- German Social Union
- The III. Path
- Liberal Conservative Reformers
- National Democratic Party of Germany
- Party of Bible-abiding Christians
- Party of Reason
- Pro Germany Citizens' Movement
- The Republicans (Germany)
- The Right (Germany)

Ghana

- New Patriotic Party

Gibraltar

- Gibraltar Conservatives
- Gibraltar Social Democrats

Greece

- Christian Democratic Party of the Overthrow
- Ecologists of Greece
- Golden Dawn
- Greek Solution
- Greek Unity
- Greeks for the Fatherland
- Independent Greeks
- National Front
- National Hope
- National Popular Consciousness
- National Unity Association
- New Democracy
- New Right
- Party of Greek Hunters
- Popular Orthodox Rally
- Recreate Greece
- Society – Political Party of the Successors of Kapodistrias
- Union for the Homeland and the People

Greenland

- Atassut
- Cooperation Party

Grenada

- New National Party

Guam

- Republican Party of Guam

Guatemala

- Bienestar Nacional
- Citizen Prosperity
- Commitment, Renewal and Order
- National Advancement Party
- National Change Union
- National Convergence Front
- Podemos
- Todos
- Unionist Party
- Valor
- Vamos

Guyana

- United Force, The

=== H ===
Haiti

- Alternative League for Haitian Progress and Emancipation
- Haiti in Action
- Haitian Tèt Kale Party
- National Reconstruction Front
- Rally of Progressive National Democrats

Honduras

- Anti-Corruption Party
- Christian Democratic Party of Honduras
- Honduran Patriotic Alliance
- National Party of Honduras

Hong Kong

- Conservative Party
- HK First (Pro-democracy camp)
- Hong Kong and Kowloon Trades Union Council (Pro-ROC camp)
- Pro-Beijing camp
  - Business and Professionals Alliance for Hong Kong
  - Civil Force
  - Democratic Alliance for the Betterment and Progress of Hong Kong
  - Economic Synergy
  - Federation of Public Housing Estates
  - Kowloon West New Dynamic
  - Liberal Party
  - New Century Forum
  - New People's Party
  - New Territories Association of Societies
  - Roundtable
- Shatin Community Network

Hungary

- Civic Response
- Civil Movement
- Democratic Community of Welfare and Freedom
- Fidesz–KDNP
  - Christian Democratic People's Party
  - Fidesz
- Independent Smallholders, Agrarian Workers and Civic Party
- Jobbik
- National Self-Government of Germans in Hungary
- New World People's Party
- Our Homeland Movement
- Sixty-Four Counties Youth Movement
- Tisza Party
- Volner Party

=== I ===
Iceland

- Centre Party
- Freedom Party
- Households Party
- Icelandic National Front
- Independence Party
- People's Party
- Viðreisn

India

- Shiv Sena (2022-present)
- Bharatiya Janata Party
- Hindu Mahasabha
- Lok Satta Party
- Maharashtra Navnirman Sena
- Shiromani Akali Dal
- Shiv Sena (Uddhav Balasaheb Thackeray)

Indonesia

- Crescent Star Party
- Democratic Party
- Golkar Party
- Great Indonesia Movement Party
- National Mandate Party
- Perindo Party
- Prosperous Justice Party
- Ummah Party
- United Development Party

Iran

- Alliance of Builders of Islamic Iran
- Coalition of the Pleasant Scent of Servitude
- Constitutionalist Party of Iran
- Executives of Construction Party (Council for Coordinating the Reforms Front (Iranian Reformists))
- Iranian Principlists
  - Ansar-e Hezbollah
  - Association of Islamic Revolution Loyalists
  - Fada'iyan-e Islam
  - Front of Followers of the Line of the Imam and the Leader
    - Islamic Association of Physicians of Iran
    - Islamic Coalition Party
    - Islamic Society of Athletes
    - Islamic Society of Employees
    - Islamic Society of Engineers
    - Islamic Society of Students
    - Zeynab Society
  - Front of Transformationalist Principlists'
    - Society of Devotees of the Islamic Revolution
    - Society of Pathseekers of the Islamic Revolution
  - Front of Islamic Revolution Stability
  - Modern Thinkers Party of Islamic Iran
  - Progress and Justice Population of Islamic Iran
  - Resistance Front of Islamic Iran
    - Development and Justice Party
    - Green Party
  - Summit of Freethinkers Party
  - Two Societies, The
    - Combatant Clergy Association
    - Society of Seminary Teachers of Qom
  - YEKTA Front
- Monotheism and Justice Front
- Nation Party of Iran (Iranian dissidents)
- National Council of Resistance of Iran (People's Mujahedin of Iran)
- Pan-Iranist Party (Iranian dissidents)

Iraq

- Bet-Nahrain Democratic Party
- Chaldean Syriac Assyrian Popular Council
- Fatah Alliance
- Iraqi Islamic Party
- Iraqi Turkmen Front
- Islamic Dawa Party
- Islamic Supreme Council of Iraq
- Kurdistan Conservative Party
- Kurdistan Islamic Union
- Sadrist Movement

Ireland

- Direct Democracy Ireland
- Fine Gael
- Human Dignity Alliance
- Independent Ireland
- Renua
- Immigration Control Platform
- National Party
- Irish Freedom Party

Israel

- Ahi
- Derekh Eretz
- Eretz Yisrael Shelanu
- Jewish Home, The
- Likud
  - Betar
- New Hope
- Religious Zionist Party
  - Atid Ehad
  - Noam
  - Otzma Yehudit
- Shas
  - Bnei Akiva
- Tzomet
- United Torah Judaism
  - Agudat Yisrael
  - Degel HaTorah
- Yachad
- Yamina
  - New Right
- Yisrael Beiteinu
- Yisrael HaMithadeshet
- Zehut

Italy

- Brothers of Italy
- CasaPound
- Cambiamo!
- Coraggio Italia
- Die Freiheitlichen
- Diventerà Bellissima
- Forza Italia
- Identity and Action
- League / Northern League
- New Force
- The People of the Family
- Populars for Italy
- Sardinian Action Party
- South American Union of Italian Emigrants
- South Tyrolean Freedom
- Southern Action League
- Tricolour Flame
- Unitalia

Ivory Coast

- Democratic Party of Ivory Coast – African Democratic Rally

=== J ===
Jamaica

- Jamaica Labour Party
- National Democratic Movement

Japan

- Conservative Party of Japan
- Japan First Party
- Liberal Democratic Party
- Party of Do It Yourself

Jordan

- Islamic Action Front
- Islamic Centre Party
- Zamzam

=== K ===
Kazakhstan

- Adal
- Ak Zhol Democratic Party
- Democratic Choice of Kazakhstan

Kenya

- Democratic Party
- Jubilee Party
  - Kenya African National Union
  - Party of Development and Reforms

Kosovo

- Albanian Christian Democratic Party of Kosovo
- Alliance for the Future of Kosovo
- Democratic League of Kosovo
- Democratic Party of Kosovo
- Guxo
- Serb List

Kuwait

- Civil Conservative Party
- Hadas
- Islamic Salafi Alliance
- National Democratic Alliance
- Popular Action Bloc

Kyrgyzstan

- Ak Jol
- Ata-Zhurt
- United Kyrgyzstan

=== L ===
Latvia

- Awakening
- Christian Democratic Union
- For a Humane Latvia
- For Latvia's Development
- Honor to serve Riga
- Liepāja Party
- National Alliance
- National Union "Justice"
- New Conservative Party
- Rising Sun for Latvia
- Unity

Lebanon

- Amal Movement (March 8 Alliance)
- Christian Democratic Union (March 8 Alliance)
- Future Movement (March 14 Alliance)
- Guardians of the Cedars
- Hezbollah
  - Loyalty to the Resistance Bloc (March 8 Alliance)
- Independence Movement
- Islamic Group (March 14 Alliance)
- Kataeb Party (March 14 Alliance)
- Lebanese Democratic Party (March 8 Alliance)
- Lebanese Forces (March 14 Alliance)
- Marada Movement (March 8 Alliance)
- Najjadeh Party
- National Liberal Party (March 14 Alliance)
- Ramgavar (March 14 Alliance)

Lesotho

- Basotho National Party
- Marematlou Freedom Party

Liberia

- National Patriotic Party (Coalition for Democratic Change)

Libya

- Liberian People's Party

Liechtenstein

- Democrats for Liechtenstein
- Independents, The
- Progressive Citizens' Party

Lithuania

- Christian Union
- Civic Democratic Party
- Electoral Action of Poles in Lithuania – Christian Families Alliance
- Freedom and Justice
- Homeland Union
- Liberal Movement
- Lithuanian Nationalist and Republican Union
- Order and Justice
- Samogitian Party
- Young Lithuania

Luxembourg

- Alternative Democratic Reform Party
- Party for Full Democracy

=== M ===
Macau

- Pro-Beijing camp
  - Alliance for Change
  - Macau United Citizens Association
  - Macau-Guangdong Union

Madagascar

- Tiako I Madagasikara

Malawi

- Malawi Congress Party
- People's Party

Malaysia

- Barisan Nasional
  - Malaysian Chinese Association
  - Malaysian Indian Congress
  - Parti Bersatu Rakyat Sabah
  - United Malays National Organisation
- Gabungan Parti Sarawak
  - Parti Pesaka Bumiputera Bersatu
  - Progressive Democratic Party
- Gabungan Rakyat Sabah
  - Homeland Solidarity Party
  - Malaysian Chinese Association
  - Malaysian Indian Congress
  - Malaysian Islamic Party
  - Malaysian United Indigenous Party
  - Parti Bersatu Rakyat Sabah
  - United Malays National Organisation
  - United Sabah Party
- HINDRAF
- Liberal Democratic Party
- Love Malaysia Party
- Love Sabah Party
- Malaysia Makkal Sakti Party
- Malaysia National Alliance Party
- Malaysian Advancement Party
- Malaysian Ceylonese Congress
- Malaysian Indian Justice Party
- Malaysian Indian Muslim Congress
- Malaysian Indian United Party
- Malaysian United People's Party
- Minority Rights Action Party
- Pan-Malaysian Islamic Front
- Parti Aspirasi Rakyat Sarawak
- Parti Bansa Dayak Sarawak Baru
- Parti Bersatu Bugis Sabah
- Parti Bumi Kenyalang
- Parti Bumiputera Perkasa Malaysia
- Parti Ekonomi Rakyat Sarawak Bersatu
- Parti Gagasan Rakyat Sabah
- Parti Rakyat Gabungan Jaksa Pendamai
- Parti Sejahtera Angkatan Perpaduan Sabah
- Penang Front Party
- Perikatan Nasional
  - Homeland Solidarity Party
  - Malaysian Islamic Party
  - Malaysian United Indigenous Party
- Punjabi Party of Malaysia
- Sabah National People's Unity Organisation
- Sabah Nationality Party
- Sabah Native Co-operation Party
- Sabah Peace Party
- Sabah People's Hope Party
- Sabah Truth Party
- United Sabah National Organisation (New)
- United Sabah Party

Malta

- ABBA
- Alleanza Bidla
- Aħwa Maltin
- Imperium Europa
- Moviment Patrijotti Maltin
- Nationalist Party

Mauritania

- Republican Party for Democracy and Renewal

Mauritius

- Mauritian Solidarity Front
- Parti Mauricien Social Démocrate

Mexico

- Ecologist Green Party of Mexico
- National Action Party
- National Synarchist Union
- Nationalist Front of Mexico

Moldova

- Alliance for the Union of Romanians
- Democracy at Home Party
- Democratic Action Party
- Dignity and Truth Platform Party
- European People's Party of Moldova
- Liberal Democratic Party of Moldova
- Liberal Party
- National Liberal Party
- National Unity Party
- Party of Action and Solidarity
- Pro Moldova
- Romanian Popular Party
- Union Political Movement

Monaco

- Horizon Monaco
  - Rally & Issues

Mongolia

- Democratic Party
- Mongolian Traditional United Party

Montenegro

- Albanian List
  - Albanian Alternative
  - New Democratic Force
- Bosniak Party
- Croatian Civic Initiative
- Democratic Front
  - Movement for Changes
  - New Serb Democracy
  - United Montenegro
- Democratic League in Montenegro (Albanian Coalition)
- Democratic Party (Albanian Coalition)
- Democratic Party of Unity
- Democratic Serb Party
- Democratic Union of Albanians
- Liberal Party of Montenegro
- Ne damo Crnu Goru
- Popular Movement
- True Montenegro

Morocco

- Constitutional Union
- Democratic and Social Movement
- Istiqlal Party
- Justice and Development Party
- National Democratic Party
- Party of Renaissance and Virtue
- Popular Movement

Mozambique

- Democratic Movement of Mozambique
- RENAMO

Myanmar

- Arakan National Party
- Kokang Democracy and Unity Party
- National Development Party
- Peace and Diversity Party
- Shan Nationalities Democratic Party
- Union Solidarity and Development Party
- Unity and Democracy Party of Kachin State

=== N ===
Namibia

- Christian Democratic Voice
- Monitor Action Group
- National Unity Democratic Organisation
- Popular Democratic Movement
- Republican Party

Nauru

- Nauru First

Nepal

- Nepal Pariwar Dal
- Nepal Shivsena
- People's Progressive Party
- Prajatantrik Shakti Party
- Rastrabadi Ekta Party
- Rastriya Janashakti Party
- Rastriya Prajatantra Party
- Rastriya Prajatantra Party Nepal
- Shivsena Nepal

Netherlands

- Belang van Nederland
- Dutch People's Union
- Farmer–Citizen Movement
- Forum for Democracy
- Forza! Nederland
- JA21
- Jezus Leeft
- Libertarian Party
- Livable Netherlands
- Otten Group
- Party for Freedom
- People's Party for Freedom and Democracy
- Reformed Political Party
- Trots op Nederland
- VoorNederland

New Caledonia

- Caledonia Together
- Caledonian Republicans

New Zealand

- ACT New Zealand
- Heartland New Zealand Party
- New Conservative Party
- New Zealand National Front
- New Zealand National Party
- New Zealand Sovereignty Party
- ONE Party
- Vision NZ

Nicaragua

- Alliance for the Republic
- Central American Unionist Party
- Conservative Party
- Constitutionalist Liberal Party
- Independent Liberal Party
- Independent Liberal Party for National Unity
- Neoliberal Party
- Nicaraguan Liberal Alliance
- Nicaraguan Party of the Christian Path
- Popular Conservative Alliance

Niger

- National Movement for the Development of Society
- Nigerien Democratic Movement for an African Federation
- Patriotic Movement for the Republic

Nigeria

- Action Congress of Nigeria
- All Nigeria Peoples Party
- Peoples Democratic Party
- People's Redemption Party
- United Nigeria People's Party
- Young Progressives Party

North Macedonia

- Alliance for Albanians
- Besa Movement
- Democratic Party of Albanians
- National Democratic Revival
- Serbian Progressive Party in Macedonia
- United for Macedonia
- VMRO – People's Party (Social Democratic Union of Macedonia)
- VMRO-DPMNE
  - Democratic Party of Serbs in Macedonia
  - United Party of Roma in Macedonia

Northern Cyprus

- Democratic Party
- National Unity Party
- Rebirth Party

Northern Mariana Islands

- Republican Party

Norway

- Capitalist Party
- Christians, The
- Coastal Party
- Conservative Party
- Democrats in Norway
- Liberal People's Party
- Norwegian People's Party
- Progress Party
- Christian Unity Party

=== P ===
Pakistan

- Jamiat Ahle Hadith
- Jamiat Ulema-e-Islam (S)
- Muttahida Majlis-e-Amal
  - Jamaat-e-Islami Pakistan
  - Jamiat Ulema-e-Islam (F)
- Pakistan Christian Congress
- Pakistan Muslim League (N)
- Pakistan Tehreek-e-Insaf
- Pakistan Muslim League (Z)
- Pakistan Rah-e-Haq Party
- Sunni Tehreek
- Awaam Pakistan
- Pakistan Rights Movement
- Tehreek-e-Labbaik Pakistan

Palestine

- Hamas

Panama

- Democratic Change
- Nationalist Republican Liberal Movement
- Panameñista Party
- People's Party

Papua New Guinea

- Triumph Heritage Empowerment Party

Paraguay

- Colorado Party
- National Union of Ethical Citizens

Peru

- All for Peru
- Alliance for Progress
- Christian People's Party
- Contigo
- Go on Country – Social Integration Party
- National Victory
- Peru Nation
- Peru Secure Homeland
- Podemos Perú
- Popular Force
- Popular Renewal
- Sí Cumple
- We Are Peru

Philippines

- Ang Kapatiran
- Bagong Lakas ng Nueva Ecija
- Bagumbayan–VNP
- Centrist Democratic Party of the Philippines
- Democratic Party of the Philippines
- Kilusang Bagong Lipunan
- Liberal Party (Philippines)
- Nacionalista Party
  - Paglaum Party
- Nationalist People's Coalition
- Partido Federal ng Pilipinas
- Partido Magdalo
- Partido Navoteño
- Partido para sa Demokratikong Reporma
- People's Champ Movement
- Social Justice Society
- United Bangsamoro Justice Party
- United Nationalist Alliance

Poland

- Christian Democracy of the 3rd Polish Republic
- Christian National Union
- Civic Coalition
- Confederation Liberty and Independence
  - Confederation of the Polish Crown
  - KORWiN
  - National Movement
    - Real Politics Union
- Confederation of Independent Poland
- Congress of the New Right
- Labour Party
- League of Polish Families
- National League
- National Revival of Poland
- National Radical Camp
- National-Catholic Movement
- Party of Drivers
- Piast Faction
- Polish Agreement
- Polish National Party
- Poland Together
- Right Wing of the Republic
- United Right
  - Agreement
  - Kukiz'15
  - Law and Justice
  - Republicans, The
  - United Poland

Portugal

- Alliance
- CDS – People's Party
- Enough
- Earth Party
- Ergue-te
- Liberal Initiative
- People's Monarchist Party
- Social Democratic Party
- We, the Citizens!

Puerto Rico

- Libertarian Party
- Nationalist Party of Puerto Rico
- New Progressive Party
- Partido Republicano Puertorriqueño
- Proyecto Dignidad
- Republican Party of Puerto Rico

=== R ===
Romania

- National Liberal Party
- Alliance of Liberals and Democrats
- National Democratic Party
- Christian Democratic National Peasants' Party
- New Republic
- New Generation Party
- National Identity Bloc in Europe
  - Greater Romania Party
  - United Romania Party
  - New Right
- M10
- People's Movement Party
- Everything For the Country Party
- Hungarian People's Party of Transylvania
- Social Christian People's Union

Russia

- Civic Initiative
- Civic Platform
- Democratic Party of Russia
- Eurasia Party
- Great Russia
- Liberal Democratic Party of Russia
- Libertarian Party of Russia
- Monarchist Party
- National Sovereignty Party of Russia
- New People
- Pamyat
- Party of Direct Democracy
- Party of Growth
- People's Freedom Party
- Rodina
- Russian All-People's Union
- Russian National Socialist Party
- Russian National Unity
- United Russia

=== S ===
Saint Kitts and Nevis

- People's Action Movement

Saint Lucia

- United Workers Party

Saint Pierre and Miquelon

- Archipelago Tomorrow

Saint Vincent and the Grenadines

- New Democratic Party

San Marino

- Sammarinese Christian Democratic Party
- Sammarinese Union of Moderates

Serbia

- Serbian Progressive Party
- Strength of Serbia Movement
- Serbian Renewal Movement
- New Serbia
- United Serbia
- Serbian Radical Party
- Democratic Party of Serbia
- Dveri
- Leviathan Movement
- Serbian Party Oathkeepers

Singapore

- People's Action Party

Slovakia

- Freedom and Solidarity
- Christian Democratic Movement
- Slovak National Party
- Christian Union
- NOVA
- Civic Conservative Party
- Republic
- We Are Family
- Hungarian Alliance
- People's Party Our Slovakia

Slovenia

- New Slovenia
- Slovenian Democratic Party
- Slovenian People's Party
- Slovenian National Party

South Africa

- Democratic Alliance (South Africa)
- uMkhonto weSizwe Party
- Inkatha Freedom Party
- ActionSA
- Freedom Front Plus
- National Conservative Party of South Africa
- African Christian Democratic Party
- Herstigte Nasionale Party
- Spectrum National Party
- United Christian Democratic Party
- Christian Democratic Party
- Cape Independence Party

South Korea

- People Power Party (South Korea)
- Liberty Republican Party
- Pro-Park New Party
- Saenuri Party (2017)
- Christian Liberal Party
- Dawn of Liberty

Spain

- People's Party
- Vox
- Asturian Forum
- Navarrese People's Union
- National Democracy
- Falange Española de las JONS
- Spanish Alternative
- España 2000

Sri Lanka

- United National Party
- Jathika Hela Urumaya
- Sri Lanka Podujana Peramuna

Sudan

- National Congress

Sweden

- Alliance (Sweden)
  - Christian Democrats
  - Moderate Party
  - Liberal People's Party
  - Centre Party
- Centre Democrats
- Citizens' Coalition
- Liberal Party
- Sweden Democrats
- Alternative for Sweden
- Nordic Resistance Movement

Switzerland

- Christian Democratic People's Party of Switzerland
- Conservative Democratic Party of Switzerland
- Swiss People's Party
- FDP.The Liberals
- Ticino League
- Evangelical People's Party of Switzerland
- Geneva Citizens' Movement
- Swiss Democrats
- Freedom Party of Switzerland
- Federal Democratic Union of Switzerland
- Swiss Nationalist Party

Syria

- Movement for Justice and Development in Syria

=== T ===
Republic of China (Taiwan)

- Pan-Blue Coalition
  - Kuomintang
  - New Party

Tajikistan

- Democratic Party
- Islamic Renaissance Party of Tajikistan

Thailand

- Democrat Party
- Pheu Thai Party
- Palang Pracharath Party
- Bhumjaithai Party
- Chartthaipattana Party
- Thai Pakdee Party
- United Thai Nation Party

Tunisia

- Ennahda Movement
- Afek Tounes
- Justice and Development Party
- Reform Front Party

Turkey

- Justice and Development Party
- Nationalist Movement Party
- Good Party
- Democracy and Progress Party
- Felicity Party
- Future Party
- Free Cause Party
- New Welfare Party
- Democrat Party
- Victory Party
- Key Party
- Great Union Party
- National Path Party
- Motherland Party
- True Path Party
- Justice Party
- Nation Party
- Conservative Ascension Party
- Technology Development Party
- Homeland Party

=== U ===
Uganda

- Conservative Party

Ukraine

- Petro Poroshenko Bloc
- People's Front
- Self Reliance
- All-Ukrainian Union "Fatherland"
- All-Ukrainian Union "Svoboda"
- Congress of Ukrainian Nationalists
- Ukrainian National Assembly – Ukrainian National Self Defence
- Right Sector
- People's Movement of Ukraine
- Revival
- 5.10
- Ukrainian Platform "Sobor"
- Ukrainian People's Party
- Republican Christian Party
- Our Ukraine
- Civil Position
- For Ukraine!
- New Russia Party
- Ukrainian Republican Party

United Kingdom

- British Democratic Party
- Britain First
- British National Party
- Christian Party
- Christian Peoples Alliance
- Conservative Party
  - Welsh Conservatives
  - Scottish Conservatives
  - Northern Ireland Conservatives
  - London Conservatives
- Democratic Unionist Party
- English Democrats
- Heritage Party
- National Front
- Traditional Unionist Voice
- Reclaim Party
- Reform UK
- UK Independence Party
- Ulster Unionist Party
- Veterans and People's Party

United States

- Republican Party
- Constitution Party
- Covenant Party
- Objectivist Party
- American Independent Party
- American Party
- Prohibition Party
- Christian Liberty Party
- Conservative Party of New York State
- New York State Right to Life Party
- Taxpayers Party of New York
- Alaskan Independence Party
- American Solidarity Party
- Tax Revolt Party
- Law & Freedom Party
- American Reform Party
- National Justice Party

Uruguay

- Colorado Party
- National Party
- Open Cabildo

=== V ===
Vanuatu

- Union of Moderate Parties
- Land and Justice Party
- Vanuatu Republican Party
- Nagriamel

Venezuela

- Copei – Social Christian Party of Venezuela

Vietnam

- People's Action Party of Vietnam
- Vietnam Reform Party

=== Y ===
Yemen

- Al-Islah

== Dissolved right-wing political parties/coalitions ==
- Albania: Albanian Fascist Party
- Algeria: Front Algérie Française
- Andorra: Century 21
- Anguilla: Anguilla National Alliance
- Argentina: Concordancia, Federalist Party, National Autonomist Party, National Civic Union, National Democratic Party, People's Reconstruction Party, Union of the Argentine People
- Armenia: Justice Alliance, Law and Unity
- Australia: All for Australia League, Australian Conservative Party, Australian Conservatives, Australian Fishing and Lifestyle Party, Australian National Socialist Party, Australians Against Further Immigration, Centre Party, City Country Alliance, Commonwealth Liberal Party, Confederate Action Party of Australia, Family First Party, Fraser Anning's Conservative National Party, Freedom and Prosperity Party, Free Trade Party, Liberal Reform Party, National Action, National Defence League, Nationalist Party, National Liberal Party, National Socialist Party of Australia, New Country Party, One Nation NSW, Outdoor Recreation Party, Pauline's United Australia Party, Progressive Conservative Party, Progress Party, Rise Up Australia Party, Smokers' Rights Party, United Australia Party, Western Australian Liberal Party, Yellow Vest Australia
- Austria: Christian Social Party, Fatherland Front, Federation of Independents, German-National Party, Greater German People's Party, Heimwehr, Nazi Party, Team Stronach
- Azerbaijan: Islamic Party of Azerbaijan
- Bahamas: United Bahamian Party
- Belarus: Beer Lovers Party, Belarusian Peasant Party, Belarusian Popular Front, Civic Party
  - Byelorussian Soviet Socialist Republic: Belarusian Independence Party
- Belgium: Catholic Party, National Front, Rexist Party, Vlaams Blok, Vlaamsch Nationaal Verbond
- Bermuda: United Bermuda Party
- Bolivia: Conservative Party, Popular Consensus, Social Democratic Power
- Bosnia and Herzegovina: Party of Democratic Activity, Serbian Radical Party of Republika Srpska
- Brazil: Alliance for Brazil, Brazilian Black Front, Brazilian Integralist Action, Brazilian Labour Party (1981), Christian Democratic Party, Conservative Party, Conservative Republican Party, Democratic Party, Democratic Social Party, Democrats, Humanist Party of Solidarity, Liberal Party (1985), Liberator Party, National Democratic Union, National Labour Party, National Renewal Alliance, Party of the Reconstruction of the National Order, Patriota, Republican Party of São Paulo, Popular Representation Party, Progressive Republican Party, Reform Progressive Party, Republican Party of Minas Gerais, Social Christian Party, Social Liberal Party, Social Progressive Party
- Bulgaria: National Social Movement, United Democratic Forces, United Patriots, Zveno
- Cambodia: Buddhist Liberal Democratic Party, Community of Royalist People's Party, Khmer People's National Liberation Front, Khmer Renovation, Liberal Democratic Party, Liberal Party, MOULINAKA, Norodom Ranariddh Party, Republican Party, Social Republican Party
- Cameroon: Cameroonian National Union, Cameroonian Union
- Canada: Action civique de Québec, Action démocratique du Québec, Alberta First Party, Alberta Social Credit Party, Alliance of the North, British Columbia Social Credit Party, Canada Party, Canadian Alliance, Canadian Union of Fascists, Christian Democrat Party of Canada, Civic Party of Montreal, Confederation of Regions Party of Canada, Conservative Party of Quebec, Freedom Conservative Party of Alberta, Liberal-Conservative Party, Manitoba Party, National Unity Party, Parti bleu, Parti nationaliste chrétien, Progressive Conservative Association of Alberta, Progressive Conservative Party of Quebec, Ralliement national, Reconstruction Party of Canada, Reform Party of Canada, Representative Party of Alberta, Social Credit Party of Canada, The Heritage Party of Alberta, Union Nationale, Progressive Canadian Party, Wildrose Party
- Chile: Conservative Party, Liberal Party, National Party, National Party (1966–1973), National Socialist Movement of Chile, Union of the Centrist Center
- China: Chinese Youth Party, Democratic Party, Kuomintang, Progressive Party, Republican Party, Union of Chinese Nationalists, Unity Party
- Congo, Democratic Republic of the: ABAKO, CONAKAT, Popular Movement of the Revolution
- Congo, Republic of the: Democratic Union for the Defense of African Interests
- Costa Rica: National Republican Party, National Unification Party, National Union Party
- Croatia: Autonomist Party, Croat-Serb Coalition, Croatian Bloc, Croatian Popular Party, Serb Democratic Party, Serb People's Radical Party Party of Rights Ustaše
- Cuba: National Liberal Party of Cuba, Progressive Action Party, Republican Party of Havana
- Cyprus: EOKA, European Party, New Horizons
- Czech Republic: Christian Democratic Party, Civic Democratic Alliance, Dawn – National Coalition, Democratic Union, European Democratic Party, Freedom Union – Democratic Union, Head Up – Electoral Bloc, National Party, Party of Conservative Accord, Public Affairs, Realists, Workers' Party
- Czechoslovakia: Carpathian German Party, Czechoslovak Agrarian and Conservative Party, Czechoslovak National Democracy, Czechoslovak Traders' Party, Democratic Party, German National Socialist Workers' Party, Jewish Conservative Party, Juriga's Slovak People's Party, National Fascist Community, National Unification, Party of National Unity, Provincial Christian-Socialist Party, Republican Party of Farmers and Peasants, Slovak National Party, Slovak People's Party, Sudeten German Party, Sudeten German Rural League, Vlajka
- Denmark: Danish People's Party (1941–43), Danish People's Party (1993), Independent Party, National Socialist Workers' Party of Denmark
- Dominican Republic: Dominican Party, Red Party
- Ecuador: Conservative Party
- Egypt: Democratic Front Party, Ittihad Party, Liberal Socialists Party, Wafd Party, Watani Party
- El Salvador: National Pro Patria Party
- Estonia: Estonian Free Party, Estonian National Independence Party, Pro Patria Union, Res Publica Party, Vaps Movement
- Eswatini: Imbokodvo National Movement, United Swaziland Association
- Ethiopia: Coalition for Unity and Democracy
- Fiji: Alliance Party, Christian Democratic Alliance, Conservative Alliance-Matanitu Vanua
- Finland: Finnish Labor Front, Finnish National Socialist Labor Organisation, Finnish People's Blue-Whites, Finnish People's Organisation, Finnish-Socialist Workers' Party, Lapua Movement, Liberals, National Socialists of Finland, National Socialist Union of Finland, Organisation of National Socialists, Party of Finnish Labor, Patriotic People's Movement, Patriotic People's Party, Young Finns
- France: Club de Clichy, Democratic Republican Alliance, French and European Nationalist Party, French Popular Party, French Social Party, Rally for the Republic, Rally of the French People, Republican Party, Union for a Popular Movement
- Georgia: Conservative Movement, State for the People
- Germany: Citizens for Mecklenburg-Vorpommern, Free German Workers' Party, German Freedom Party, German People's Union, Party for a Rule of Law Offensive
  - Divided Germany: Alliance for Germany, All-German Bloc/League of Expellees and Deprived of Rights, Democratic Awakening, Deutsche Rechtspartei, German Party, German Social Union, Socialist Reich Party
  - Nazi Germany: Nazi Party
  - Weimar Republic: Bavarian People's Party, Christian Social People's Service, Conservative People's Party, German-Hanoverian Party, German National People's Party, German People's Party, German Völkisch Freedom Party, German Workers' Party, National Socialist Freedom Movement
  - German Empire: Christian Social Party, Free Conservative Party, German Conservative Party, German Fatherland Party, German Social Party
- Ghana: Progress Party, United Gold Coast Convention, United Party
- Gibraltar: Party for the Autonomy of Gibraltar, Progressive Democratic Party
- Greece: 4th of August Party, Democratic Renewal, English Party, Freethinkers' Party, Front Line, Greek National Socialist Party, Greek Rally, Hellenic Front, Liberal Democratic Center, Movement of Free Citizens, National Alignment, National Democratic Party, National Democratic Union, National Party of Greece, National Political Union, National Radical Union, Nationalist Party, New Party, Party of Hellenism, Party of New Liberals, Patriotic Alliance, People's Party, Political Spring, Politically Independent Alignment, Progressive Party, Russian Party, United Nationalist Movement, Union of Royalists
- Greenland: Association of Candidates
- Guatemala: Institutional Republican Party, National Liberation Movement, Patriotic Party, Renewed Democratic Liberty
- Hong Kong: Co-operative Resources Centre, Democratic Alliance, Federation for the Stability of Hong Kong, Hong Kong Progressive Alliance, Liberal Democratic Federation of Hong Kong, New Hong Kong Alliance, Progressive Hong Kong Society
- Hungary: Arrow Cross Party, Christian Economic and Social Party, Christian National Party, Christian National Socialist Front, Conservative Party, Deák Party, Holy Crown Society, Hungarian Democratic Forum, Hungarian Democratic People's Party, Hungarian Freedom Party, Hungarian Justice and Life Party, Hungarian National Socialist Party, Liberal Party, Modern Hungary Movement, National Constitution Party, National Legitimist Party, National Party of Work, United Hungarian National Socialist Party, Unity Party
- Iceland: Citizens' Party, Liberal Party, Nationalist Party
- India: All-India Muslim League, Unionist Party (Punjab), Congress Nationalist Party, Bharatiya Jana Sangh, Swatantra Party, Shiv Sena
- Indonesia: Catholic Party, Indonesian Christian Party, League of Supporters of Indonesian Independence, Islamic Education Movement, Masyumi Party
- Iran: Azure Party, Islamic Republican Party, Rastakhiz Party, SUMKA
- Ireland: Progressive Democrats
- Israel: Development and Peace, Free Centre, Gahal, General Zionists, Gesher, Hatzohar, Herut, Herut – The National Movement, Kach, Mekhora, Morasha, National Religious Party, Ometz, One Israel, Tehiya, Shlomtzion, Yamin Yisrael, Yisrael BaAliyah, Yiud
- Italy: Christian Democracy, Citizens' Union for South Tyrol, Forza Italia, Italian Nationalist Association, Italian Social Movement, National Alliance, National Fascist Party, Social Action, The Right, National Movement for Sovereignty
- Japan: Party for Future Generations, Sunrise Party, Japan Innovation Party, New Renaissance Party, Liberal League
  - Empire of Japan: Rikken Seiyūkai, Kokumin Dōmei, Tōhōkai
- Korea (Japanese rule): Iljinhoe
- Latvia: All for Latvia!, Civic Union, For Fatherland and Freedom/LNNK, Latvia's First Party, National Union, Pērkonkrusts, Reform Party
- Liechtenstein: German National Movement in Liechtenstein
- Lithuania: Liberal and Centre Union, Lithuanian Nationalist Union
- Luxembourg: Volksdeutsche Bewegung
- Mexico: Mexican Democratic Party, National Synarchist Union
- Montenegro: Montenegrin Federalist Party
- Netherlands: General League of Roman Catholic Caucuses, Anti-Revolutionary Party, Catholic People's Party, Centre Democrats, Centre Party, Christian Historical Party, Christian Historical Union, Free Anti Revolutionary Party, Pim Fortuyn List, National Socialist Movement in the Netherlands, Reformatory Political Federation, Reformed Political League, Roman Catholic State Party
- New Zealand: New Zealand Reform Party, Social Credit Party
- Nicaragua: Nationalist Liberal Party
- Nigeria: Northern People's Congress
- Norway: Christian Unity Party, Nasjonal Samling
- Pakistan: Muslim League
- Peru: Revolutionary Union, Odriíst National Union
- Poland: National Democracy
- Portugal: Republican Union, Catholic Centre Party, National Republican Party, Republican Liberal Party, Reconstitution Party, Nationalist Republican Party, Union of Economic Interests, National Syndicalists, National Union
- Romania: Iron Guard
- Russia: Baltic Republican Party, Christian Democratic Party of Russia, Conceptual Party "Unity", Congress of Russian Communities, Conservative Party of Russia, Constitutional Democratic Party – Party of Popular Freedom, Democratic Choice of Russia, Democratic Choice of Russia – United Democrats, Democratic Union, Derzhava, For Women of Russia, Forward, Russia!, Front of National Revolutionary Action, Great Fatherland Party, Liberal Russia, Male State, Movement Against Illegal Immigration, Nashi, Nation and Freedom Committee, National Republican Party of Russia, National Socialist Russian Workers' Party, National Socialist Society, New Course — Automobile Russia, Northern Brotherhood, Oprichny Dvor, Our Home – Russia, Party of Economic Freedom, Peasant Party of Russia, People's Militia named after Minin and Pozharsky, People's National Party, People's Union, Popular Patriotic Party, Power to the People!, Right Cause, Russian Party, Russian Socialist Party, Russian Unity, Russians, Slavic Union, Russian All-National Union, Russian National Union, Russian National Unity, Union of Right Forces, Union of the Russian People, Unity
  - Soviet Union: Liberal Democratic Party of the Soviet Union, Lithuanian Activist Front, VSKhSON
  - Russian Empire: Party of Return to Serfdom, Russian Assembly, Russian Monarchist Union, Progressive Party, Union of October 17, Union of the Muslims of Russia, Union of the Russian People, United Nobility
- San Marino: Sammarinese Fascist Party
- Serbia: Chetniks, Party of Serbian Unity, Yugoslav Radical Union, G17 Plus, United Regions of Serbia
- Slovakia: Slovak People's Party, Slovak Democratic and Christian Union – Democratic Party
- South Africa: Conservative Party, Herstigte Nasionale Party, National Party, New National Party
- South Korea: Korea Independence Party, Liberal Party, Democratic Republican Party, Democratic Justice Party, United Liberal Democrats, Democratic Liberal Party, United Liberal Democrats, Liberty Forward Party, Pro-Park Coalition, Liberty Korea Party, New Conservative Party, Onward for Future 4.0, Bareunmirae Party, New Alternatives, Our Republican Party
- Spain: Moderate Party, Conservative Party, Traditionalist Communion, Spanish Patriotic Union, Popular Action, Spanish Renovation, Spanish Agrarian Party, Liberal Republican Right, Spanish Confederation of Autonomous Rights, FET y de las JONS, National Union, Popular Alliance
- Sweden: Hats, New Democracy, Party of the Swedes, National Socialist Workers' Party
- Thailand: Thai Nation Party, Khana Ratsadon, Seri Manangkhasila Party
- Timor-Leste: Timorese Popular Democratic Association
- Togo: Rally of the Togolese People
- Turkey: Nation Party, Democrat Party, Republican Nation Party, Republican Villagers Nation Party, Democratic Party, New Turkey Party, Justice Party, Motherland Party, Great Turkey Party, True Path Party, Nationalist Task Party, Democrat Turkey Party, National Order Party, National Salvation Party, Virtue Party, Welfare Party, Turkey Party, People's Voice Party
- Uganda: Kabaka Yekka
- United Kingdom: British Union of Fascists, Tory Party
- United States: American Nazi Party, Anti-Masonic Party, Dixiecrats, German American Bund, Modern Whig Party, National States' Rights Party, Silver Legion
- Zimbabwe: Rhodesian Front

== See also ==
- List of left-wing political parties
- List of centrist political parties
- List of syncretic political parties

=== Politics ===
- Right-wing politics
- Centre-right
- Far right
- Radical right (disambiguation)
- Liberalism
- Conservatism
- Nationalism
- Fascism

=== Parties ===
- Christian Democratic Party
- Centrist Democrat International
- Conservative Party
- International Democrat Union
- National Front
- National Party
- People's Party
