= Belarusian Independence Bloc =

Belarusian political alliance

Belarusian Independence Bloc Беларускі Незалежніцкі Блок
- Founded: 2009
- Headquarters: Minsk
- Ideology: Christian democracy (majority); Anti-Lukashenko; Pro-Europeanism
- Political position: Centre-right
- Colours: Red
- House of Representatives: 0 / 110
- Council of the Republic: 0 / 64

The Belarusian Independence Bloc (Belarusian: Беларускі Незалежніцкі Блок, romanized: Biełaruski Nezaležnicki Błok) is one of three major opposition coalitions in Belarus. The coalition was formed in 2009 as an alternative to the United Democratic Forces of Belarus (UDF). The group intention is to choose a single candidate to defeat the incumbent Alexander Lukashenko, the president since 1994.

== Member parties ==
There are 8 political parties in the Belarusian Independence Bloc of Belarus coalition, these are:

- Banned party:
  - Partyja BPF
- Party with registration status in progress:
  - Belarusian Christian Democracy
- Unregistered parties and movements:
  - Za svabodu
  - Malady Front
  - YCSU Young Democrats
  - Right Alliance
  - Young Belarus
  - Razam

New members are accepted in Belarusian Independence Bloc only if agreed by all existing members. That was a reason European Coalition was not admitted to Belarusian Independence Bloc

== Participation in elections ==
At local elections in 2010 Belarusian Independence Bloc had over 500 candidates, significant campaigns were run by Aleś Łahviniec, Źmicier Babicki, Maksim Hubarevič, Taciana Kuǔšynava and a few others. From all of them, just 3 candidates of Belarusian Christian Democracy have won elections in their districts.
