= Democratic Centrist Coalition =

Political alliance in Belarus

The Democratic Centrist Coalition (Belarusian: Кааліцыя дэмакратычных цэнтристаў, romanized: Kaalicyja Demakratyčnych Centrystaŭ) was a political alliance in Belarus, that opposes the administration of president Alexander Lukashenko. In legislative elections held between October 13–17, 2004, the coalition did not secure any seats.

The coalition was formed by the following parties:

- Republic (Respublika)
- Young Belarus (Maladaja Bielaruś)
- European Coalition Free Belarus (Jeŭrapiejskaja Kaalicyja Svabodnaja Bielaruś)
- Belarusian Social Democratic Party - People's Assembly (Sacyjal-Demakratyčnaja Partyja Bielarusi (Nardonaja Hramada))
- Belarusian Women's Party Hope (Bielaruskaja Partyja Žančyn "Nadzieja")
