= Young Democrats =

Young Democrats may refer to:

- Young Democrats of America
- Young Democrats for Europe
- Young Democrats (Netherlands)
- Young Democrats (Italy)
- YCSU Young Democrats (Belarus)
- Young Democrats (Germany)
- Alliance of Young Democrats (Hungary, this original full name supplanted by abbreviated Fidesz in the 21st century)

== See also ==
- International Young Democrat Union
