= European Coalition Free Belarus =

European Coalition Free Belarus Еўрапейская кааліцыя «Свабодная Беларусь» Европейская коалиция «Свободная Беларусь»
- Leader: Andrei Sannikov
- Founded: 1 November 2003
- Dissolved: June 2005
- Headquarters: Minsk
- Ideology: Liberal democracy Pro-Europeanism
- Political position: Centre
- Colours: Blue and yellow

The European Coalition Free Belarus (Belarusian: Еўрапейская кааліцыя Свабодная Беларусь, romanized: Ewrapiejskaja kaalicyja Svabodnaja Biełaruś) was a political coalition in Belarus which opposed the continued rule of President Alexander Lukashenko.

In legislative elections held between October 13–17, 2004, the ECFB was part of the Democratic Centrist Coalition which did not secure any seats.

The coalition was formed by the following parties and political youth organizations:

- Belarusian Social Democratic Party (People's Assembly) (Bielaruskaja Sacyjal-Demakratyčnaja Partyja - Nardonaja Hramada)
- Belarusian Liberal Party of Freedom and Progress (PFP) (Bielaruskaja Liberalnaja Partyja Svabody i Prahresu)

The European Coalition became part of the wider United Democratic Forces of Belarus which in October 2005 elected Alaksandar Milinkievič as their candidate for the 2006 Presidential Election.
