= Party of Conservative Accord =

Party of Conservative Accord Strana konzervativní smlouvy
- Leader: Ivan Mašek; Zuzana Bönischová
- Founded: 12 March 1998
- Dissolved: 23 June 2001
- Split from: Civic Democratic Alliance
- Merged into: Conservative Party
- Ideology: Conservatism
- Political position: Centre-right

The Party of Conservative Accord (Czech: Strana konzervativní smlouvy) was a conservative political party in the Czech Republic between 1998 and 2001. It was founded by a split of rightist wing of the Civic Democratic Alliance. Front figures of the party were Ivan Mašek, Čestmír Hofhanzl, Viktor Dobal, Zuzana Bönischová and Roman Joch. On 23 June 2001 party dissolved and merged into the Conservative Party.
