= YCSU Young Democrats =

Belarusian youth organisation

YCSU Young Democrats МХСЗ Маладыя дэмакраты
- Chairperson: Alaksandar Šumkievič
- Founded: 1997
- Ideology: Christian democracy
- National affiliation: Belarusian Independence Bloc
- International affiliation: none
- European affiliation: Youth of the European People's Party (observer); European Christian Political Youth Network (observer)
- Website: www.newgeneration.ws

The Youth Christian Social Union – Young Democrats, often shortened to the YCSU Young Democrats (Belarusian: МХСЗ Маладыя дэмакраты, romanized: MChSZ Maładyja demakraty) is a Christian democratic youth organisation from Belarus. Since 2004 the YCSU has been a member of the Youth of the European People's Party, an umbrella organization of European political youth organisations that is the official youth wing of the European People's Party. The YEPP brings together over 54 centre-right youth political organisations from over 35 countries across Europe and is considered to be the largest political youth organisation in Europe. The YCSU Young Democrats was admitted as an observer member of the European Christian Political Youth Network in 2004.

== History ==
The Youth Christian Social Union was founded in 1997 and officially registered by the Ministry of Justice of Belarus from 1998 until 2003. On the eve of the 2004 parliamentary elections, it lost its legal status when the Supreme Court decided to liquidate the YCSU Young Democrats based on the suit of the Ministry of Justice. The main reason was that members began campaigning for opposition candidates and undertaking street actions.

In 2002, the Youth Christian Social Union merged with the Youth of the United Civil Party of Belarus and a new brand YCSU Young Democrats was created. From 2002 to 2008, the YCSU Young Democrats was cooperating with the United Civil Party of Belarus, but at the last congress the decision was taken to become independent. Some members who did not support the decision left the group and stayed in the UCP Youth.

At a congress in 2009, the group supported Alaksandar Milinkievič as a candidate for the forthcoming elections, YSCU Young Democrats made one more attempt to gain legal status, but the Ministry of Justice declined, supported by the Supreme Court.

== Political activities ==
Independent observation over the 2000 parliamentary elections under the aegis of the Organization for Security and Co-operation in Europe. The YCSU supported the decision of majority of democratic organizations to take an active part in campaign of boycott of the unfree and undemocratic "parliamentary elections".

At the time of the 2001 presidential elections in Belarus, the YCSU formed a "Peramenaw!" (For Changes) coalition with other youth organisations, including Young Front, the Association of Belarusian Students, the Association of Young Entrepreneurs, Young Hramada, the UCP Youth, the Belarusian Association of Young Politicians. YSCU activists took part in work in headquarters, independent observation and mobilization campaigns. YSCU supported Alaksandar Jarošuk and Uładzimier Hančaryk.

The took active participation in the 2003 local elections (as candidates, volunteers and managers). Members of the organization served as deputies of local councils in cities including Mogilev and Rogachev.

During the 2006 presidential elections the YCSU Young Democrats supported Alaksandar Milinkievič as an opposition candidate. After the election results were broadcast, the YCSU Young Democrats took an active part in the Jeans Revolution. Ten members of the YCSU Young Democrats were arrested when police attacked the tent camp erected on October Square in Minsk.

In the 2008 parliamentary elections the YCSU Young Democrats had three candidates in the united list of 110 opposition candidates, Alaksandar Šumkievič in Maładziečna, Hanna Jahorava in Minsk, Artur Curbakoŭ in Homiel. According to the official results the opposition parties failed to gain any seats, all of which went to parties and non-partisan candidates loyal to president Alexander Lukashenko. Alaksandar Šumkievič received 5,566 votes, 10.39% of all votes in Maładziečna

The YCSU Young Democrats was among the founders of Belarusian Independence Bloc in 2009.

Numerous activists of the YCSU Young Democrats have been arrested and imprisoned by Belarusian police and secret police for their political activities.

== Board ==
=== Current board ===
- Chairman: Alaksandar Šumkievič
- Deputy Chairman: Artur Curbakoŭ
- International Secretary: Alaksandar Kuŭšynaŭ

=== Previous leaders ===
- Kirył Ihnacik
- Uładzimier Čyrvonienka
- Andrej Kazakievič
