= Young Front =

Belarusian youth movement

Young Front Малады Фронт
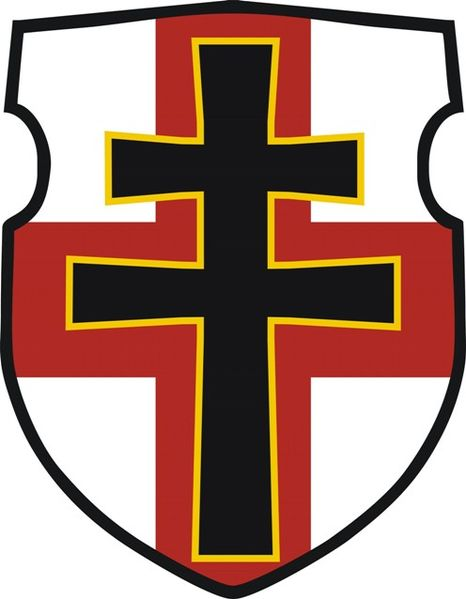
- Leader: Dzyanis Urbanovich
- Founded: 1997
- Ideology: Belarusian nationalism Christian democracy Conservatism
- European affiliation: Youth of the European People's Party, European Democrat Students
- Website: malady-front.blogspot.com

The Young Front (Belarusian: Малады Фронт, romanized: Malady Front, МФ, MF) is a Belarusian youth movement registered in the Czech Republic, a member of the European Democrat Students. As of 2012, it was the largest youth organisation of Belarus declaring democratic orientation; a pro-Western, right-wing movement advocating Christian and national-conservative values and in opposition to the personal power regime of Alexander Lukashenko. In 2022, the Belarusian authorities designated the organization as an extremist formation, with the effect of Belarusian law criminalising participation in the Young Front.

== History ==
Young Front was founded in 1997 and initially began as a loose movement of independent youth; with human rights activist Palina Sharenda-Panasiuk among its founding members. It brought together tens of youth initiatives and organizations under its umbrella. Over time, the Young Front has undergone significant development, evolving from a protest movement during the 1996–1997 period into a right-centrist organization, shaped by its political ideology.

- I YF Congress was held on 6 September 1997; Paval Sieviaryniec, Siahiej Paŭlenka, Alaksandar Asipcoŭ were elected to be co-Chairmen of the YF
- II YF Congress held on 10 February 1999 elected Paval Sieviaryniec to be Chairman of the movement.
- III Congress on 1 July 2000 reelected Paval Sieviaryniec to be YF Chairman and with adopting a program "Young Front of Changes", laid Christian principles and the national idea in the ideological foundation of organization.
- IV congress on 19 June 2002 reelected Paval Sieviaryniec to be YF Chairman.
- V YF Congress divided in two sessions, on 23 May 2004 and 23 January 2005, elected YF co-Chairmen Siarhiej Bachun and Źmicier Daškievič.
- VI YF Congress held on 9 March 2008 adopted an updated strategy of the Young Front: Reformation of the Young Front, according to which the movement left the United Democratic Forces of Belarus (UDF). The Congress elected Źmicier Daškievič to be a Chairman.

== Aims and objectives ==
The guiding principles of the Young Front are the union and education of young people on the basis of the Belarusian national identity, Christian-democratic principles, a civil society built on the foundations of democracy and free markets, and the development of a spiritually and physically strong generation.

The main objectives of the Young Front are the realizing of social and creative initiatives among young people, mass and agitation activity in order to revive Belarusian schools, culture, language, and forming young peoples' responsibility for the future of Belarus.

== Activity ==
The Young Front has about 1,000–1,500 activists in its ranks, incorporated in regional and district branches. The supreme body, the Congress, takes place at least once every two years. The organization is headed by the Sejm and the Office of the Young Front between the Congresses.

The Young Front is a member of political youth international organizations such as European Democrat Students, the Youth of the European People's Party; and has partnerships with sister organizations in Ukraine, Sweden, Lithuania, Poland and other countries.

Since 1997 the Young Front has been holding a permanent socio-political campaign "The city is ours!". On important dates and on the eve of important events, the YF activists hang massive white-red-white national flags from roofs all over Belarus. The campaign actions of "The city is ours!" were held in many cities of Belarus – more than 2000 flags are hung all in all.

As a result of active and successful activity in 1999 the Young Front has already a rating of popularity among young people of 10.8%, trailing only pro-governmental Belarusian Republican Youth Union (48.3%) and BCM (25%).

In 2000 at the parliamentary elections the Young Front held a boycott campaign under the title: "Forgery" – ridicule of electoral farce organized by Lukashenko.

The Young Front during the presidential election campaign in 2001 became the organizer of the Belarusian Youth Congress, in which more than 520 delegates from each part of Belarus took place. It also initiated the signing of special Agreement between the only candidate from the opposition and the youth. During the presidential election campaign in 2001 the Young Front became a member of the mobilization campaign "Choose!" During the selection rush the Young Front made more than 1100 moves in more than 120 Belarusian cities.

On 24 September 2001 the Young Front organized guard in the region of Kurapaty, being against the reconstruction of Minsk encircling highway, as it thought that a new road could pass the burials. More than 120 activists took part in eight months' move "Kurapaty’s Protection".

According to the Baltic Service of Gallup Institute over October 2002, the rating of the Young Front among the whole population of Belarus was 6,3%, and 14% among the youth (18–30 age). In contrast, political parties have 0,5%–5% popularity, and "the factor of fear" in society is very high.

members of the Young Front participated and won in local council elections (2003) in several districts, then took part in the elections to the House of Representatives of Belarus in 2004, but without any success. The block Young Belarus, established by the Young Front was a part of the Committee of Democratic Political Forces, and then formed a part of the United Democratic Forces of Belarus.

The activists of the Young Front collected more than 40,000 signatures against the holding of the referendum in 2004 concerning the remarks to the constitution which lifted restrictions for two presidencies. The Young Front organized a protest move at October Square (Kalinouskaga Square). Źmicier Daškievič, one of the leaders of the Young Front and Young Belarus was arrested and taken to prison for 10 days of the administrative arrest. Paval Sieviaryniec, one of the founders of the Young Front and the leader of Young Belarus was arrested and sentenced to three years of so-called labour imprisonment for organizing unauthorized demonstrations on the day of the referendum and the next day.

During the 2006 presidential election campaign, the Young Front was one of the organizers of the protests against the falsification of voting results, and also they organised "the encampment" at October Square in Minsk (20–24 March 2006).

In June 2006, the members of the Young Front, deprecating the criminal persecution of activists of the organization, went on hunger strike, which became one of the longest and mass socio-political hunger strikes. It lasted for 24 days by more than 100 people.

Some activists and leaders of the Young Front traced into the organizing committee of the establishment of the Belarusian Christian Democratic Party.

In 2008 the members of the Young Front held a number of nationwide campaigns. Within the scope of the social campaign "Belarusian Book – To Children" the activists of the Young Front collected thousands of Belarusian-language publications which were later given to orphanages in Minsk and other Belarusian cities. Money and objects which collected at the Christmas festival "Hurry To Do Good" in which many prominent Belarusian musicians and socio-political figures participated were handed to orphanages and boarding schools.

From 7 to 10 December 2008, the Young Front carried out a campaign, "Communism before a tribunal" which was finished with a daylong fast. During the campaign the Young Front organized dozens of anticommunist pickets and informational moves in Belarus, then held a social-scientific conference titled: "The Crimes of Communism. Numbers and Facts".

In 2008 during the campaign "MTS in Belarusian", firstly started by the Saligorsk blogger, fascinated people, addressing a range of letters and e-mails to the headquarters of presentation of "MTS" in Belarus. In response the mobile operator created a Belarusian-language version of website. Later the activists handed the headquarters of the company more than 2500 signs for the Belarusification of the MTS. As a result, customer support service in Belarusian appeared on the receivers of telephone subscribers.

The Young Front often organizes dozens of street protests annually. Since it was founded the organization has carried out dozens of national socio-political campaigns, the most famous of which are the following: "The Move of Love" "The City is Ours", "Belarus to Europe", "Elections", "Choose!", "No to the Third Time", "We Want the New", "Boycott 2008", "Communism Before a Tribunal", "Belarusian Book – To Children", "Christmas Festival".

In the 2011 protests following Lukashenko's disputed 2010 re-election, Daškievič and Eduard Łobaŭ were both arrested for assault. The two were sentenced to two years' and four years' hard labor, respectively. They were subsequently named prisoners of conscience by Amnesty International.

=== Controversy ===
On 5 November 2007, activists of the organization were arrested after celebrating Belarusian colllaborator Vituška's hundredth birthday.

On 25 March 2014 activists of the Young Front participated in a demonstration with a banner praising Ukrainian and Belarusian nationalist leaders who collaborated with Nazi Germany during World War II: Stepan Bandera, Michał Vituška, Roman Shukhevych, Vincent Hadleŭski. The banner bore the description: "Heroes do not die". This had led to protests from the Russian ambassador.

== Opposition to Lukashenko’s regime ==
Since 2005 the Young Front applied for registration five times from the Ministry of Justice, but it was rejected every time The members of the organization believe that the authorities deliberately do not register the organization in order not to have leverages of pressure on the activists by means of unconstitutional article 193-1 of the Criminal Code of the Republic of Belarus (sharing in the organization with no carried-out registration). Within the scope of the campaign of resistance to criminal persecution for the activity in the unregistered organization the members of the Young Front registered their own organization in the Czech Republic, the documents have been submitted for the registration to Lithuania, planning to get official status in Poland and Ukraine.

The activists of the Young Front regularly take part in unauthorized demonstrations, during which most of them are arrested by the police. The leaders of the organization and its ordinary members run the administrative persecution, the most prevailing of which are the arrest (till 25 days) and fines. Some of them were condemned; the most famous are the following – Alaksiej Šydłoŭski, Vadzim Łabkovič, Paval Sieviaryniec, Pavał Mažejka, Artur Fińkievič, Źmicier Daškievič.

After the presidential election campaign the criminal cases on Źmicier Daškievič, Siarhiej Lisičonak, Barys Harecki and Aleh Korban were opened by Article 193-1 (establishment and management of public association, religious association or political party, which infringe on personality, rights and duties of man and did not get official registration). According to the criminal case the leader of the Young Front Źmicier Daškievič was condemned for a year and a half of general regime colony (1 November 2006).

During a year other leaders and activists of the Young Front were condemned by this article: Ivan Šyła, Nasta Pałažanka, Źmicier Chviedaruk, Alaksiej Janušeŭski, Aleh Korban, Barys Harecki, Nasta Azarka, Jarasłaŭ Hryščenia, Kaciaryna Sałaŭjova, Edward Zielankoŭ. They were punished with fines or warnings.

Some criminal proceedings were brought by the same article and did not come to trial. The criminal cases were brought on the following: Kiryl Atamančyk, Andrej Cianiuta, Arsień Jahorčanka, Siarhiej Hudzilin, Jaŭhien Vaŭkaviec, Alaksandar Čarejka. The leader of the Young Front in town Žodzin Pavał Krasoŭski was suspected of complicity in explosions in Vitebsk and committing two homicides. He was taken to investigative isolation ward, and in a month Pavał Krasoŭski was released for complete lack of evidence.

The members of the Young Front and Belarusian community consider that their friends are condemned for reasons of policy for their opposition activity. The organization held sympathetic actions with the condemned and also with those who found themselves under the criminal persecution. In solidarity with the Young Front such outstanding politicians as Alaksandar Milinkievič, Anatol Labiedźka. After the discharge Alaksandar Kazulin became an honorable member of the Young Front.

Due to strong campaign of solidarity with the chairman of the Young Front Źmicier Daškievič he was discharged for 1.5 months before the given time. Mentioning the willingness "to sacrifice personal freedom, health and even life in the name of his own ideals" Belarusian daily newspaper Nasha Niva named Źmicier Daškievič "The Man of 2007". The activists of the movement believe that the aforesaid is the proof of the fact that the Belarusian regime suffered a defeat in the trials to bring to a stop the youth movement.
