= Right Alliance (Belarus) =

Right Alliance Правы альянс
- Abbreviation: PA
- Leader: Juraś Karetnikaw
- Founded: February 2004
- Preceded by: Belarusian Freedom Party
- Headquarters: Minsk
- Newspaper: «Pachodnia», «Vartawnik Dziaržavy», «Pawdniovy Zachad»
- Ideology: Ultraconservatism; Traditionalism; Civic nationalism Belarusian nationalism Anti-Russian sentiment Anti-Communism
- Political position: Far-right
- Colours: White; Red; Black
- Slogan: «Our cause is right!» (Belarusian: «Наша справа правая!»)

Party flag

Website
- aljans.org

The Right Alliance (RA or PA; Belarusian: Правы альянс, romanized: Pravy aĺjans) was a youth non-governmental organization in Belarus. It functioned as an organizing committee and aimed to get officially registered. The RA stand for conservative, traditional values and supported Belarusian national revival.

== History ==
The Right Alliance was founded in early 2004 by former members of the Belarusian Freedom Party (BFP), which was voluntarily dissolved prior and its members transferred to the newly-formed party. The RA was founded as an association of Belarusian patriotic youth initiatives. The organization's leader was Juraś Karetnikaw, and had several hundred members and representatives in all of Belarus's oblasts (regions).

During its existence, the RA has organized and conducted dozens of social and national actions and campaigns: recreation of a memorial sign in honor of Kastuś Kalinowski on Kalinowski street in Minsk, celebration of the Day of The City in Mahilow, erection of a memorial cross in the village of Dražna, torch procession at the Heroes` Day in Słucak, «Antymak» (anti-poppy) campaign, aimed at prohibition of sale of opium containing poppy-seeds.

In 2004–2008, the RA worked closely with various Belurusian right-wing parties and organizations. They participated in the "For Freedom" movement led by Aliaksandar Milinkievič, and cooperated with the organizing committee of the Belarusian Christian Democracy (BCD), the Party of Belarusian Popular Front (PBPF), as well as other right-wing organizations in Ukraine, Lithuania and Poland. Its publications include: bulletin «Pachodnia», «Vartawnik Dziaržavy» newspaper, and the «Pawdniovy Zachad» district newspaper.

In October 2005, it was engaged in organizing security during the first Congress of Democratic Forces.

During the 2006 Belarusian presidential election, members of The RA, besides spreading informational and canvassing, provided security for a joint candidate of the United Democratic Forces (UDF), Alaksandar Milinkievič.

During the local elections in 2007, 12 members of the RA became candidates for deputy (of which 4 in the capital of the country). Three members of the organization took part in the elections to the House of Representatives in 2008.

During the presidential elections in 2010 the Right Alliance provided security for candidate Uladzimir Nyaklyayew. In September 2011, the Right Alliance declared that it has ended its political activity.
