= Conservative Party (Czech Republic) =

Conservative Party Konzervativní strana
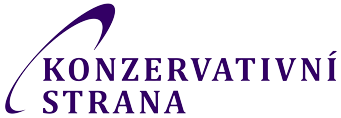
- Leader: Jan Kubalčík
- Founded: March 16, 1990
- Headquarters: Římská 26, Prague
- Ideology: Conservatism; Euroscepticism; Anti-communism
- Political position: Centre-right
- Colours: Violet

Website
- https://www.konzervativnistrana.cz

The Conservative Party (Czech: Konzervativní strana), abbreviated to KONS, is a small centre-right political party in the Czech Republic.

== History ==
Founded in 1990, the party merged with the Union Republicans in 1993, and the Party of Conservative Accord in 2001.

== Leadership ==
- 1990-1993 - Dr. Ganzwohl
- 1993-2008 - Dr. Fořt
- 2008–present - Dr. Kubalčík
