= Sammarinese Union of Moderates =

Sammarinese Union of Moderates Unione Sammarinese dei Moderati
- Leader: Romeo Morri and Glauco Sansovini
- Founded: 21 February 2008
- Dissolved: 12 November 2012
- Headquarters: Via Cà Bartoletto, 26 – RSM-47895
- Ideology: Christian democracy National conservatism
- Political position: Centre-right
- Colours: Blue, White

The Sammarinese Union of Moderates (Italian: Unione Sammarinese dei Moderati, USDM) was a centre-right, Christian-democratic, national-conservative political coalition in San Marino.

It was founded on 21 February 2008 and consisted of the Christian-democratic Sammarinese Populars and the national-conservative Sammarinese National Alliance, after a new electoral law introduced a threshold of 3.5% (both parties were below that threshold in the 2006 general election). In the 2008 general election Sammarinese Union of Moderates ran within the centrist Pact for San Marino coalition. The electoral coalition won 35 seats out of 60 in the Grand and General Council in the 2008 general election gaining 54.22% of the national vote and a governmental majority of 5, becoming the new government of San Marino. The Sammarinese Union of Moderates itself gained 2 seats and 4.17% of the national vote.

The coalition was disbanded after the disastrous 2012 general election, where the alliance obtained solely 340 votes.
