= Ivan Mašek =

Czech politician (1948–2019)

Ivan Mašek (28 July 1948 in Prague – 7 January 2019) was a Czech politician who served as a Deputy between 1993 and 1998.
