= Krepostniki =

Political faction in Russia Empire

Krepostniki (Russian: крепостники) was a reactionary political faction in the 1800s Russian Empire. It supported retaining serfdom in Russia in the run up to the Emancipation Reform of 1861.

== History ==
After the Emancipation of serfs in Russia, Alexander II began to have serious doubts about his course. After suffering a backlash from the Russian aristocracy for his act, Alexander II moved to the right, and began to replace progressive, government administrators with members from Kryepostniki. Ministers of the Interior and War (the Milyutin brothers, Nikolay Milyutin and Dmitry Milyutin) were replaced, and a whole series of government bureaus were emptied and restacked with Kryepostniki, for instance, the Liberal Emancipation Committees were replaced.

The Kryepostniki are known to represent "a vast majority of the gentry owners of Russia’s 111,555 estates." While some have advocated outright serfdom, the key-issue they advocated was a "Baltic model" of serf-emancipation, specifically where the serfs would be freed, but without any significant land being redistributed to them.

The party was known for its very vocal press, which made endless complaints about the lack of "hands" available for the estates of the nobility, as well as advocating for a number of things: abolishing the obshchina (the village community), abolishing justices of the peace (popularly-controlled judicial system), and establishing a "nobility bank," in which the government would give interest-free loans to the rich. Herbert Spencer criticized the party by saying "the reality is that few landlords care to cultivate their estates...[the landlord's wealth] have been squandered in maintaining the old standard of living..."

== Legacy ==
The famous author, Vera Broido, remembers the history of the Emancipation Act, with all of its reactionary rigor, and reflected that it satisfied nobody, "not even the Kryepostniki."
