= Belarusian Women's Party "Nadzieja" =

Banned political party in Belarus

Belarusian Women's Party "Nadzieja" Беларуская партыя жанчын «Надзея» Белорусская партия женщин «Надзея»
- Abbreviation: BWP "Nadzieja" (English); BPŽ «Nadzieja» (Belarusian); BPZh «Nadzeya» (Russian)
- Leader: Valiancina Palievikova (1994-2002); Valiancina Matusievič (2002-2006); Aliena Jaśkova (2006-2007)
- Founded: 28 April 1994; 31 years ago
- Banned: 11 October 2007; 18 years ago
- Headquarters: Minsk
- Membership (2004): 1,316
- Ideology: Women's rights Social democracy
- Political position: Centre-left
- National affiliation: United Democratic Forces
- International affiliation: Progressive Alliance
- Colours: Light blue

The Belarusian Women's Party "Nadzieja" (Belarusian: Беларуская партыя жанчын «Надзея», romanized: Biełaruskaja partyja žančyn "Nadzieja"; Russian: Белорусская партия женщин «Надзея», romanized: Belorusskaya partiya zhenshchin «Nadzeya») (Belarusian for "Hope") is a political party in Belarus which opposes the administration of president Alexander Lukashenko. In legislative elections held between 13 and 17 October 2004, the party did not secure any seats. It was created in 1994. Leader of the party is Alena Jaśkova.

On 11 October 2007, the Supreme Court of Belarus banned the Belarusian Women's Party "Nadzieja".
