= Beer Lovers Party (Belarus) =

Beer Lovers Party Партыя аматараў піва Партия любителей пива
- Abbreviation: BLP (English); PAP
- Leader: Andrej Ramašeŭski
- Founded: 10 August 1993
- Registered: 30 December 1993
- Dissolved: 1998
- Headquarters: Minsk, Belarus
- Membership (1995): 2,500
- Ideology: Joke party Liberalism
- Political position: Centre-right
- Colours: Red; White

Party flag

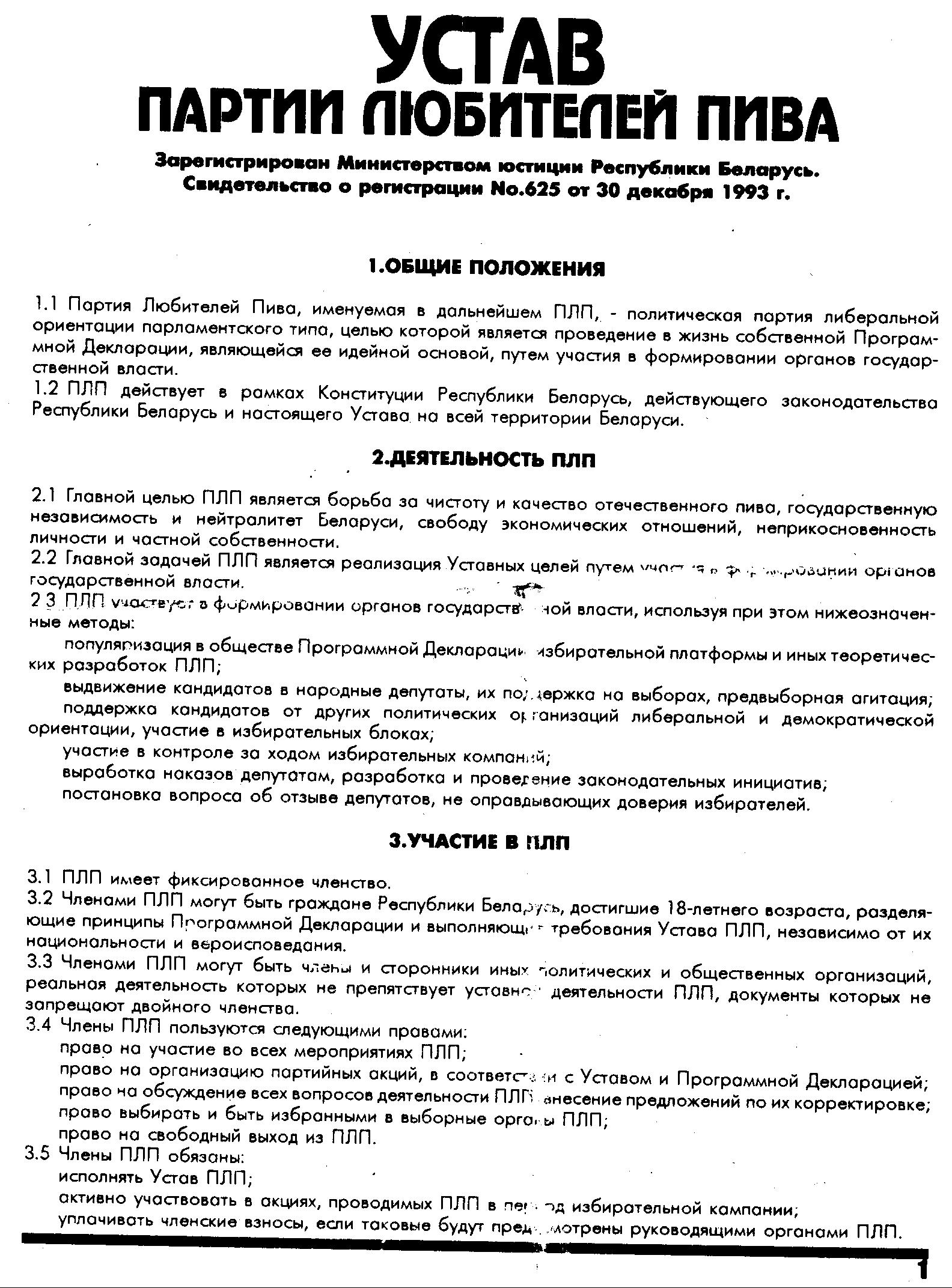
Party Statute (page 1)

Beer Lovers Party (BLP; Belarusian: Партыя аматараў піва, romanized: Partyja amataraŭ piva; Russian: Партия любителей пива, romanized: Partiya lyubiteley piva) was one of several Beer Lovers Parties created in some post-Soviet states, including Belarus. It was officially registered on 30 December 1993.

According to its statute, "the major goal of the BLP is the struggle for the cleanness and quality of the national beer, state independence and the neutrality of Belarus, freedom of economic relations, personal inviolability and the inviolability of private property".

The Chairman was Andrej Ramašeŭski (Андрэй Рамашэўскі).

In 1995 Ramašeŭski was arrested and imprisoned for burning the flag of the Byelorussian SSR in public in protest against the change of national symbols by Belarusian President Lukashenko after a controversial referendum. He was detained for hooliganism ("злостное хулиганство, совершенном с особым цинизмом", "malicious hooliganism, perpetrated with a pronounced cynicism"), and after 3 months of imprisonment, on 19 July 1996 he received suspended sentence for two years of prison. Ramašeŭski denies that it was he who burned the flag, referring to a video of the event. Later he emigrated first to Poland and later to the Czech Republic and became a Czech citizen and, lately, a member of Czech Pirate Party. After that the affairs of the party went into a disarray.

The party was liquidated in 1998 by the Supreme Court of Belarus. The declared reason of the liquidation of BLP (as well as of several other parties) was failure of the party to address the request of the Belarus Ministry of Justice about the membership statistics and management structure of the party.

The logo of the Party is an allusion to the "drunken hedgehog", a stereotype from Russian jokes.

== See also ==
- Novelty candidate
- List of frivolous political parties
