= 2006 Belarusian presidential election =

- 19 March 2006
- Registered: 7,133,978
- Turnout: 92.94% (▲9.08 pp)
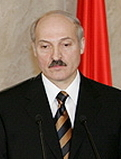

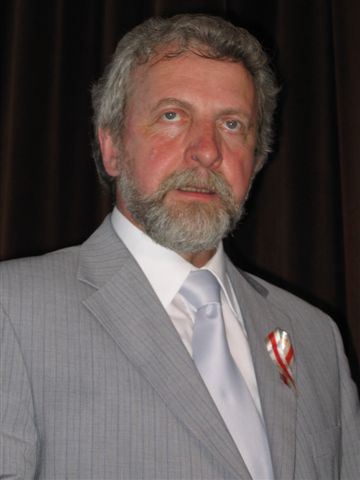
Nominee	Alexander Lukashenko	Alaksandar Milinkievič
Party	Independent	ADSB
Popular vote	5,501,249	405,486
Percentage	84.44%	6.22%
- Results by region Lukashenko: 60–65% 75–80% 80–85%
President before election
Alexander Lukashenko
Independent
Elected President
Alexander Lukashenko
Independent

The Belarusian presidential election was held on 19 March 2006. President Alexander Lukashenko won his third term against three other candidates: unified democratic opposition candidate Alaksandar Milinkievič, Sergei Gaidukevich, and Alyaksandr Kazulin.

Lukashenko had been in office since 1994. He consolidated his power and abolished presidential term limits in a 2004 referendum. The United States and the European Union criticized him for a poor human rights record and authoritarian rule. While Russia and Belarus had formally established the Union State in 1999, the relationship had experienced tensions due to difficulties in implementing full integration. The Orange Revolution in Ukraine and the Rose Revolution in Georgia prompted Russia to back Lukashenko's re-election.

The Central Election Commission of Belarus announced the results on 23 March, claiming Lukashenko won with 84.4% of the vote. The Organization for Security and Co-operation in Europe concluded that the election "failed to meet OSCE commitments for democratic elections".

The day after the election, Russian President Vladimir Putin congratulated Lukashenko on his win, while the EU and the US did not recognize the results and called for a new election. The opposition accused the government of election fraud and called for mass protests. Known as the "Jeans Revolution", the protests were dispersed by police. The European Union and the United States sanctioned high-ranking members of the Belarusian government, including Lukashenko.

== Background ==
=== Domestic ===
Alexander Lukashenko became Belarus's first president in 1994. Two years later, a conflict with the Belarusian Parliament led to a referendum in 1996 that expanded presidential power. He then won reelection in 2001, officially receiving 77.39% of the vote. In 2004, a referendum abolished term limits for the presidency, allowing him to run in 2006.

Lukashenko consolidated his power during the second term. In 2001, presidential defamation was criminalized. A year later, the OSCE mission was expelled and a law was passed that prohibited foreigners to lead religious groups. Journalist Veronika Cherkasova, who reported on arms sales to Iraq, was found dead in 2004. In 2005, discrediting the Belarusian state became a crime.

Between 2003 and 2005, the Belarusian government closed the European Humanities University, the Belarusian Humanities Lyceum, the independent pollster IISEPS, and 157 NGOs. In 2005, it passed legislation that imposed stricter requirements for NGO funding and made it harder for unregistered ones to function. The total number of NGOs did not change between 2003 and 2007, but the restrictions affected civil society, as only 10% of NGOs were involved in pro-democracy activities.

Prior to the election, Belarusian wages and pensions rose, driven by annual economic growth of 8% to 11% between 2001 and 2005.

=== International ===
Belarusian relations with the West gradually worsened after Alexander Lukashenko's election as President in 1994, and deteriorated further following the 1996 referendum. This referendum expanded presidential powers and established a new Parliament that was not recognized by the EU or the USA. The presidential elections of 2001 were deemed neither free nor fair by the OSCE.

The American invasion of Iraq further worsened relations, as Lukashenko supported that country. A top aide to Saddam Hussein was reportedly found in possession of a Belarusian passport, and American leadership repeatedly accused Belarus of supplying weapons to Iraq. In 2004, Congress passed an Act aimed at promoting democracy and civil society in Belarus. The following year, U.S. Secretary of State Condoleezza Rice called Belarus an "outpost of tyranny" and later met with Belarusian opposition leaders.

The expansion of the EU led to a common border with Belarus and the adoption of the European Neighbourhood Policy. New EU member countries, mainly Poland and Lithuania, advocated for more pressure on Lukashenko's government. In 2004, the EU introduced sanctions against six individuals for inhibiting civil rights and awarded the Sakharov Prize to the Belarusian Association of Journalists in December. In 2005, Poland and Belarus had a diplomatic dispute, with Poland accusing Belarus of repressing its Polish minority and Lukashenko accusing Poland of attempting to stage a revolution.

The early 2000s saw the Orange Revolution in Ukraine and the Rose Revolution in Georgia. In 2002, Gene Sharp said that such a revolution was "somewhat possible" in Belarus. In 2004, the Polish President said that bringing democracy to Belarus was a European task, and former Czech President Václav Havel called Belarus "The Last Totalitarian Country in Europe" and urged democratization. Lukashenko claimed that the West was plotting a similar color revolution against him.

Belarus and Russia formed the Union State in 1999. While initially both sides sought closer cooperation, the relationship worsened, with failures to adopt a common currency, military, or an anthem. In 2002, Lukashenko expelled Russian politician Boris Nemtsov from Belarus. In 2004, Russia and Belarus had a gas dispute, and in the same year, Lukashenko introduced a 75% quota for Belarusian music on radio. In 2005, Russia criticized Belarus for human rights abuses. Nevertheless, the threat of a revolution similar to Ukraine's led Russia to strongly back Lukashenko in the election, the conduct of which was announced by the Belarusian parliament just one day after a meeting between Putin and Lukashenko.

== Electoral system ==
The President of Belarus was elected for a five-year term. Since 2004, there had been no term limits for the Presidency. Candidates had to be natural-born citizens, at least 35 years old, and have lived in Belarus for at least 10 years preceding the election.

Presidential elections used a two-round system. A candidate won in the first round if they received an absolute majority. If no candidate won, a second round was held between the two leading candidates. Voter turnout had to be at least 50% for the election to be valid.

Elections were overseen by the Central Election Commission of Belarus (CEC). To be registered, a candidate had to form an initiative group of at least 100 members to collect 100,000 signatures, which were submitted for verification.

The House of Representatives of Belarus set the election date. The date had to be declared at least five months before the expiration of the current term, and the election itself had to be conducted at least two months prior to the expiration. In the 2006 Presidential election, the date was declared nine months in advance and the election was held six months before the term ended.

The presidential election in 2006 followed this timeline:

16 December 2005	The House of Representatives officially announced the election date
27 December 2005	Registration of initiative groups by the CEC
17 February 2006	Registration of candidates by the CEC
19 March 2006	Election Day
23 March 2006	The CEC declared Alexander Lukashenko as the elected President
8 April 2006	Inauguration Day

== Candidates ==
On 1–2 October 2005, Alaksandar Milinkievič was chosen as the unified candidate of the democratic opposition, receiving more votes than Anatoly Lebedko at the National Congress of Democratic Forces.

On 17 February 2006, the Central Election Commission approved the following list of candidates from the eight whose initiative groups were registered:

Candidate	Party	Position	Signatures
Alexander Lukashenko	Independent	President of the Republic of Belarus	1,905,637
Alaksandar Milinkievič	United Democratic Forces of Belarus	Program manager, Local Development Support Fund	198,798
Sergei Gaidukevich	Liberal Democratic Party of Belarus	Deputy of the House of Representatives	150,504
Alyaksandr Kazulin	Belarusian Social Democratic Party	Currently unemployed	158,014

=== Former candidates ===
- Zianon Pazniak: withdrew on 26 January
- Valeri Frolov: withdrew on 1 February in favor of Kazulin
- Alexander Voitovich: withdrew on 9 January
- Sergei Skrebets: withdrew in late January, supported Kazulin

== Campaign ==
=== Alexander Lukashenko ===
Alexander Lukashenko, based his campaign on the economic growth during his tenure. He promised to reduce bureaucracy and support private business. Regarding foreign policy, he said that the development of the Union State was a strategic goal and stated he remained open to political dialogue with other countries. Lukashenko claimed he was committed to Belarus's independence and sovereignty, and said he was not supported by the Kremlin.

His campaign relied on state-owned media, receiving 95% of prime-time television coverage and 90% in state-owned newspapers.

=== Alaksandar Milinkievič ===
Alaksandar Milinkievič, a physicist by education, became involved in politics during the late Soviet Union, serving on the Grodno City Council. He was one of the leaders of Siamion Domash's 2001 campaign staff and, despite being Belarusian and Orthodox, was accused by state media of being Polish and Catholic.

He supproted liberal economic policies and the promotion of democratic values. Milinkievič was a pro-European candidate; during his campaign he met with then-President of the European Commission José Manuel Barroso and German Chancellor Angela Merkel. He did not support Belarus's accession to NATO.

He did not believe he could officially win the election, and said his intention to "get people out into the street" comparing his stance to that of the Polish Solidarity movement in 1980. Milinkievič viewed the election as an opportunity for open campaigning, for instance, it marked the first time in five years that the opposition received any television airtime. He also described his mission as "God-given".

=== Sergei Gaidukevich ===
Sergei Gaidukevich, a military veteran and leader of the Liberal Democratic Party of Belarus, won a seat in parliament in the 2000 elections and had previously run in the 2001 presidential election.

He was the only candidate with whom Lukashenko was willing to shake hands. Gaidukevich did not actively campaign, and the signatures for his nomination were collected with state assistance. Regarding potential protests on Election Day, he said that protests were for "losers", and he would emerge as a victor.

=== Alyaksandr Kazulin ===
Alyaksandr Kazulin, a former rector of Belarusian State University, faced criticism from Lukashenko in 2001 for students' poor voting records and was subsequently removed in 2003 on corruption charges.

Kazulin criticized Lukashenko for authoritarianism, an inefficient economic system, and corruption. He was more aligned with Russia than with the West and accused Lukashenko of exploiting Russian "brotherly feelings".

Kazulin attacked the high-ranking positions achieved by Lukashenko's sons. He called Lukashenko a "thug" and reportedly broke his portrait while in police custody.

=== Events ===
Yearly mentions of Belarus in The New York Times, the 2006 Presidential elections received unprecedented amount of international attention

On 31 January, Milinkievič met with European leaders in Brussels, who warned Lukashenko to conduct free and fair elections.

On 8 February, Belarus accused Poland of espionage. Poland denied the accusation, saying it was part of Lukashenko's election campaign.

On 22 February, the Russian Ministry of Foreign Affairs criticized the OSCE, claiming they had already predetermined not to declare the Belarusian election free and fair.

On 24 February, a State Department representative urged the Belarusian government not to use force and expressed concern over the arrest of activists.

On 26 February, Belarusian state media ran a story alleging that the KGB had discovered Gallup exit polls showing Milinkievič as the victor. Baltic Gallup responded that the polls were fake.

On 1 March, the KGB head claimed that the opposition planned to seize government buildings and stage a false flag terrorist attack.

On 2 March, Kazulin was briefly arrested and beaten after attempting to enter the All-Belarusian People's Assembly meeting.

On 9 March, Belarusian Popular Front leader Vincuk Viačorka was arrested and sentenced to 15 days in prison for participating in an unsanctioned rally.

On 16 March, the head of the KGB announced that the opposition was planning a coup, alleging that they intended to poison Minsk's water supply. He threatened the death penalty for those involved in "terrorism". By this time, 60 people had already been jailed.

On 17 March, the White House published a report calling Belarus a dictatorship bordering the EU and NATO and accused Lukashenko of corruption and enrichment via the arms trade. Lukashenko dismissed the report and labeled George W. Bush "terrorist No. 1".

== Opinion polling ==
Initially, when no specific opposition candidates were named, Lukashenko was polled against a hypothetical opposition leader. The results of these IISEPI polls are as follows:

If presidential elections were tomorrow, whom would you vote for?
	10.2001	04.2002	09.2002	12.2002	03.2003	09.2003	06.2004	11.2004	03.2005	05.2005	09.2005
Lukashenko	46.0	30.9	27.0	30.5	26.2	31.7	34.2	47.7	46.4	41.7	47.3
Other candidate	11.8	8.3	6.5	5.0	2.6	4.0	3.0	1.5	1.4	2.0	3.5

Despite its official closure in April 2005, IISEPI continued to conduct polls.

Pollster	Date	Alexander Lukashenko	Alaksandar Milinkievič	Sergei Gaidukevich	Alyaksandr Kazulin
IISEPI	16–29 April	63.1	18.8	5.2	7.3
IISEPI	27 March - 6 April	64.9	21.4	2.2	5.0
Official results	19 March	84.4	6.2	3.5	2.3
VCIOM	Early March	60	11		5
IISEPI	10–20 February	64.7	18.3	5.0	2.2
Baltic Gallup	Early January	54.6	16.8		2.9

Voter demographics
Demographic subgroup	Lukashenko	Milinkievič/Kazulin	Gaidukevich	% of total vote
Total vote	67.9	28.2	3.9	100
Gender
Men	60.0	33.9	4.0	45.4
Women	72.5	23.7	3.8	54.6
Age
18–30 years old	47.4	50.0	2.6	22.1
30–50 years old	60.0	33.9	6.1	39.2
51 and older	84.0	13.5	2.5	38.7
Educational attainment
Less than general secondary	89.0	9.0	2.0	25.0
General secondary	64.0	30.2	5.8	37.0
Vocational or higher	55.2	41.3	3.5	38.0
Employment
Private	40.0	55.2	4.8	18.1
Public	67.2	27.8	4.9	41.5
Student	49.1	49.8	1.1	6.4
Retiree	88.0	9.2	2.8	28.2
Unemployed	46.9	49.4	3.8	5.8
Region
City of Minsk	49.7	46.3	4.0	16.6
Minsk	62.9	29.2	8.0	15.3
Brest	74.4	22.2	3.4	14.6
Grodno	71.4	27.6	1.1	12.0
Vitebsk	58.9	37.6	3.6	13.8
Mogilev	78.9	20.5	0.6	12.1
Gomel	85.4	9.3	5.3	15.6
Area type
Capital	49.7	46.3	4.0	16.6
Oblast center	65.1	32.8	2.1	17.0
>50,000 pop.	67.7	26.9	5.5	18.1
<50,000 pop.	73.3	23.0	3.7	17.6
Rural	75.8	20.1	4.1	30.7

== Results ==
=== Monitoring ===
The OSCE mission of 546 observers said the election did not meet democratic standards. It criticized early voting, through which 31% of eligible voters cast their ballots, and limited access to result tabulation, the exclusion of opposition members from electoral commissions, and their sparse representation among observers.

In response, the Central Election Commission of Belarus claimed that the alleged abuses were either unverified or conducted in accordance with Belarusian law, which it asserted met international standards. The 467-member delegation from the Commonwealth of Independent States said the election was open and transparent.

=== Electoral results ===
Official results, announced on 23 March, showed Lukashenko winning in a landslide.

Candidate	Party	Votes	%
Alexander Lukashenko	Independent	5,501,249	84.44
Alaksandar Milinkievič	United Democratic Forces of Belarus	405,486	6.22
Sergei Gaidukevich	Liberal Democratic Party	230,664	3.54
Alyaksandr Kazulin	Belarusian Social Democratic Party (Assembly)	147,402	2.26
Against all		230,320	3.54
Total		6,515,121	100.00
Valid votes		6,515,121	98.26
Invalid/blank votes		115,532	1.74
Total votes		6,630,653	100.00
Registered voters/turnout		7,133,978	92.94
Source: Nohlen & Stöver

=== Results by region ===
Region	Lukashenko		Milinkievič		Gaidukevich		Kazulin	
Region	Votes	%	Votes	%	Votes	%	Votes	%
Brest	802,971	82.6%	61,581	6.3%	18,450	1.9%	20,560	2.1%
Vitebsk	724,772	83.1%	39,002	4.5%	46,413	5.3%	18,941	2.2%
Gomel	959,641	90.3%	37,004	3.5%	34,942	3.3%	11,862	1.1%
Grodno	651,523	83.8%	49,384	6.4%	16,501	2.1%	14,472	1.9%
Minsk	878,763	83.5%	76,906	7.3%	19,889	1.9%	25,758	2.4%
Mogilev	716,697	88.5%	32,231	4.0%	39,600	4.9%	13,300	1.6%
City of Minsk	766,882	70.8%	109,378	10.1%	54,869	5.1%	42,509	3.9%
Total (Note: Percentages do not exclude invalid or blank votes.)	5,501,249	83.0%	405,486	6.1%	230,664	3.5%	147,402	2.2%
Source: "Central Election Commission of Belarus" (PDF). Archived from the original (PDF) on 6 May 2021.

== Reactions ==
=== Domestic ===
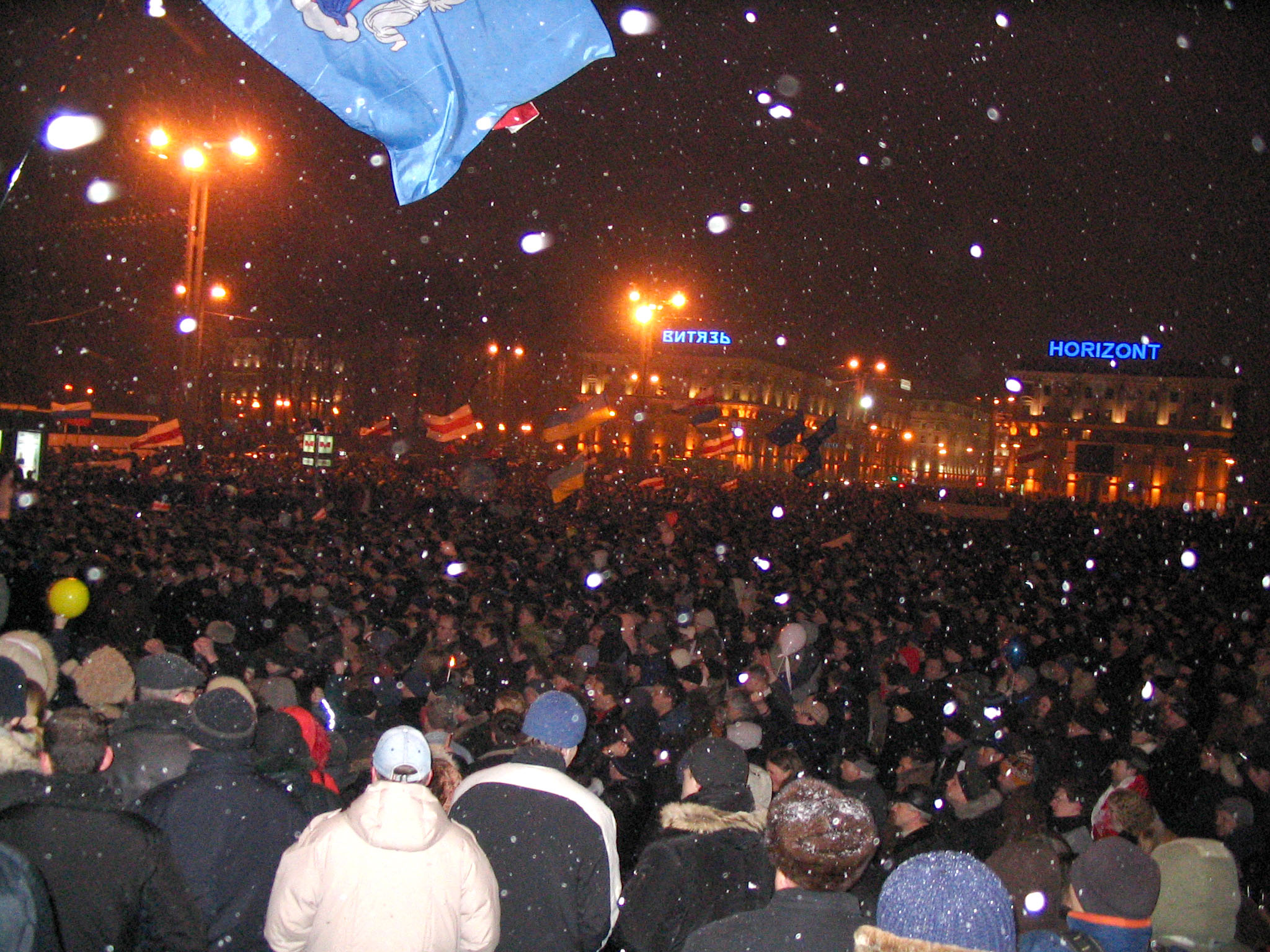
Mass opposition protests in Minsk on March 19

Following the election, an organization with ties to the government released exit poll results claiming that Lukashenko secured over 80% of the vote. Milinkievič's campaign office said that he received 25.6% of the vote, compared to Lukashenko's 47%.

Belarusian authorities said they would crush any protests following the election. Lukashenko declared victory and the defeat of the "revolution", stating that while he was unwilling to jail Milinkievič and Kazulin, he did not rule out the possibility.

Protesting the election results, approximately ten thousand people gathered at October Square in Minsk. They waved the Belarusian white-red-white flag, the flag of Europe, and flags of other nations such as Ukraine, Poland, and Russia. Several hundred protesters remained at the square overnight and thousands were present each evening.

The opposition planned a large protest for Saturday, which coincided with the anniversary of the establishment of the Belarusian People's Republic. The police dispersed the protests early on Friday, arresting hundreds. On Saturday, 6,000 people gathered, but riot police blocked their access to the central square and arrested Kazulin, who was sentenced to five and a half years in prison in July.

Jan Rybar, a reporter of the Czech daily Mlada fronta Dnes, was beaten at the opposition demonstration in Minsk. He speculated he had been attacked by agents of the Belarusian KGB. Belarusian authorities arrested the former Polish ambassador to Belarus Mariusz Maszkiewicz and Polish journalist Weronika Samolinska. In total, over 500 people were arrested during the protests.

Belarusian state television claimed that two of its reporters were beaten by protesters. The Belarusian Association of Journalists doubted the incident occurred, suggesting the reporters were at most hit with snowballs. Amidst the unrest, Lukashenko postponed his inauguration, conducting it on 8 April in military uniform. He blamed the West for inciting the protests. He later claimed in November that his true vote count was over 90% and that he had falsified it down to 80% to appear more appealing to Europeans, but they did not appreciate his gesture.

=== Western countries ===
The report of the OSCE stated that the election failed to meet democratic standards.

On 20 March, the State Department called for a new vote. In May, George W. Bush issued a proclamation restricting members of the Belarusian government from traveling to the US. In June, he introduced financial sanctions against 10 people, including Lukashenko, for undermining democratic processes.

On 6 April, the European Parliament adopted a resolution that condemned the "failed Presidential elections". The Council of the European Union sanctioned 31 people, including Lukashenko. In October, Milinkievič was awarded the Sakharov Prize, the EU's top human rights award.

Czech President Václav Klaus decided not to congratulate the Belarusian President.

=== Russia ===
Russian President Vladimir Putin called Lukashenko the day after the elections to congratulate him. A few days later, Russian Foreign Minister Sergey Lavrov claimed that the OSCE mission had played a provocative role and accused it of declaring elections illegitimate before the election day.

Pro-government media lauded the outcome as a defeat for "orange" political technologies. The liberal opposition condemned Lukashenko's actions, and organized a protest of about ten people which was dispersed.

Russia said on 30 March that Belarus's gas prices were unacceptably lower than European ones. By 19 April, Belarus agreed to cede some control of the state natural gas monopoly, Beltransgaz. Russia had sought this control since the early 1990s, nearly getting a similar deal in April 2002. The formal agreement was signed in May 2007 and allowed Gazprom to acquire a 50% stake in the company by paying $2.5 billion from 2007 to 2010.

== See also ==
- Jeans Revolution
- A Lesson of Belarusian
