= Young Belarus =

Belarusian political association

Young Belarus (Belarusian: Маладая Беларусь, romanized: Maładaja Biełaruś) is a youth political block in Belarus, founded by "Young Front" and some leaders of democratic movement on March 14, 2004. In 2009, Young Belarus became just another youth political organisation in Belarus; later that year Young Belarus separated into two separate wings, both claiming to be the real Young Belarus:

- First Young Belarus is registered in Lithuania, led by Kaśpiarovič and Tsimafei Drančuk.
- Second Young Belarus in not registered, but is considered to be a member of the Belaruski Nezaležnicki Block, which is led by Artur Fińkievič and supports Milinkievič.

== Information about the movement ==
=== Time of founding ===
The founding of the movement “Young Belarus” was officially declared on September 28, 2008, on the day of the 2008 parliamentary elections in Belarus. The idea of creating a youth movement belongs to Artur Fińkievič, a former political prisoner and the ex-Vice-Chairman of the “Young Front”. The name “Young Belarus” first appeared in the year 2004. It was the name of the pre-electoral block created before the parliamentary elections in Belarus. Artur Fińkievič was then one of the leaders of the above-mentioned pre-electoral block.

=== Age group ===
The organization is targeted towards youth in the ages of 16-35, students of higher educational establishments, technical and professional schools, secondary schools, and working youth.

=== Aim ===
The organization's stated goals are mobilizing and uniting socially active Belarusian youth, building up of the civil society on the grounds of democracy and free market, helping to form an all-round and harmonically developed generation on the basis of Belarusian national history, language and culture.

=== Platform ===
The organization was created in order to unite politically and socially active young people of different views. The organization is considered to be on the conservative side of the political spectrum, with a clear orientation toward national values.

=== Activities ===
The group's activities in October 2008 to 2010 consisted of:

- Conducting a series of street actions and pickets dedicated to victims of political repressions in Belarus, in Minsk (action in memory of the missing ex-Minister on Internal Affairs Jury Zacharanka, action in memory of deceased human rights activist Jana Palakova) and in different cities of the country (Solidarity Days)
- Art-performance on the anniversary of adopting of the Universal Declaration of Human Rights
- Action against violent military drafts
- Pickets in protest against the results of the 1996 referendum
- Hanging of the national white-red-white flags on the roofs of buildings in the central streets of Minsk and other regions
- Participation in mass street actions and demonstrations organized by Belarusian opposition structures (Day of Freedom, Čarnobylsky Šlach-2009)
- Conducting of voluntary street actions aimed at cleaning up the territory of the city
- Action-performance “Throw at me if you don’t like the regime!” on December 2, 2009
- Conducting of the campaign “For Independent Belarus!” aimed at popularization of national symbols and conceptualization of independence as the most important value for a country and its people. The time frame of the campaign was three months starting on November 3, 2009.
- Participation as a subject in the organizational committee on preparation of the Belarusian-European Forum in November 2009.
- Creator and subject of the Belarusian Pro-Independence Block created on October 27, 2009; a subject of a series of local democratic coalitions at the regional level; participation in the 2010 municipal elections.

=== Quantity of activists ===
Approximately 350 people

=== Representativeness of the movement ===
As of now, the movement “Young Belarus” is represented in the following cities of Belarus: Minsk, Mogilev, Zhodzina, Grodno, Polotsk, Novopolotsk, Vitebsk, Smalyavichy, Masty, Zelva, Ushachy, Shchuchyn, Novogrudok, Vawkavysk, Gomel, Orsha, Brest etc.
