= Alaksandar Milinkievič =

Belarusian politician and pro-democracy activist (1947–2026)

Alaksandr Milinkievič
- Аляксандр Мілінкевіч (Belarusian); Александр Милинкевич (Russian)
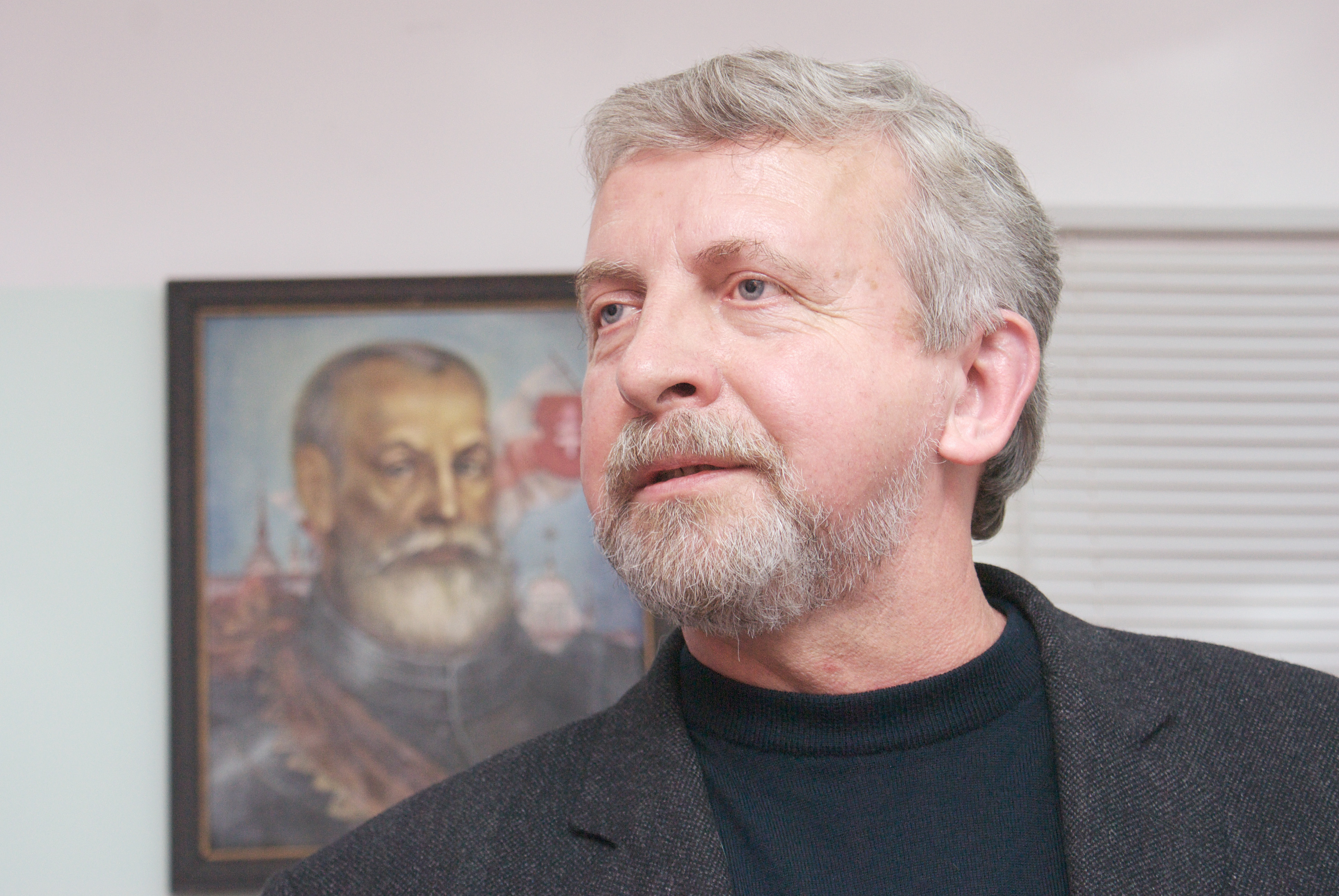
- Milinkievič in 2009
- Born: 25 July 1947; Grodno, Byelorussian SSR, Soviet Union
- Died: 11 August 2026 (aged 79)
- Education: University of Grodno
- Occupation: Politician
- Known for: Presidential candidate (2006)
- Spouse: Inna Kuley
- Children: 2

Alaksandar Uładzimieravič Milinkievič (Belarusian: Аляксандар Уладзімеравіч Мілінкевіч, Russian: Александр Владимирович Милинкевич, romanized: Aleksandr Vladimirovich Milinkievich, 25 July 1947 – 11 August 2026) was a Belarusian politician. He was nominated by the leading opposition parties in Belarus to run against incumbent Alexander Lukashenko in the 2006 presidential election.

== Background ==
Milinkevič was born in Grodno on 25 July 1947. After graduating from the University of Grodno, he defended his Ph.D. thesis at the Institute of Physics of the National Academy of Sciences of Belarus. Between 1980 and 1984 he was in charge of the (then forming) Faculty of Physics at the University of Sétif in Algeria. He also served as a docent at the University of Grodno between 1978 and 1980, and then from 1984 on to 1990. At that time he also started to cooperate with local city authorities as chief of one of the committees. Soon he reached the rank of deputy mayor of the city.

In 2001 he was the chief of staff of Siamion Domash, one of the opposition leaders running for president in the 2001 presidential elections of Belarus. In October 2005 he was chosen by the United Democratic Forces of Belarus as the joint candidate of the opposition in the presidential elections of 2006.

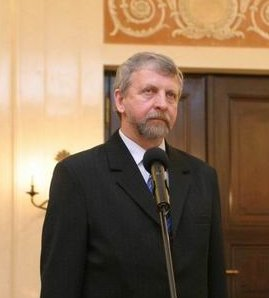
Alaksandr Milinkievič in Poland, 30 March 2006

On 12 December 2006 he was awarded the Sakharov Prize by the European Parliament.

He was the recipient of the seventh Hanno R. Ellenbogen Citizenship Award, awarded annually by Prague Society for International Cooperation and the Global Panel Foundation, as well as the recipient of the Decoration of Honor Meritorious for Polish Culture.

Milinkievič died from complications of surgery on 11 August 2026, at the age of 79. He was buried at Powązki Military Cemetery in Warsaw.

== Campaign for presidency ==
In October 2005, at a Congress of Democratic Forces, roughly 900 delegates from various political and civil society groups met in the capital Minsk to pick a single opposition candidate for the 2006 Presidential election. Milinkievič won over three other political leaders at the meeting (including Stanislav Shushkevich and Anatoly Lebedko). The unification process has the aim of selecting a single opposition figure who would run against President Lukashenko, who has run Belarus for over a decade. Belarus' opposition forces had previously tried to field a single candidate in the 2001 presidential elections.

Milinkievič compared his campaign to that of another pro-Western opposition candidate in neighboring Ukraine, Viktor Yushchenko, whose victory in late 2004 was dubbed the "Orange Revolution". Although disappointment in Yushchenko's government culminated in a political crisis in September 2005 amid renewed allegations of mass graft coupled with a worsening economic situation, Milinkievič called that year's events in Ukraine an inspiration for his supporters. "We believe that Belarus will be next after… Ukraine," he told Associated Press.

However, opposition leaders realized that an uphill struggle lay ahead, despite their support from U.S.-funded NGOs. Lukashenko's market socialism economy has significant support in rural areas of the country. Belarus is one of the few areas of the former Soviet Union where the country's social welfare network remains virtually unchanged since the Soviet era.

In the 2006 presidential election official results gave Milinkievič 6% of the vote against 83% for the incumbent Lukashenko. Confiscation of his leaflets during the campaign was found by the UN Human Rights Committee to violate his rights.

In January 2006 Milinkievič was invited to Paris by the French government.He met with the French Minister of Foreign Affairs, and gave numerous interviews to Western media, including a TV interview to Euronews. Milinkievič, just like any other opposition activist, had absolutely no TV access inside Belarus, as the media in Belarus is state-controlled. The only exception when he was allowed to appear on Belarusian television was his pre-election speech in 2006. Earlier, he had already met the new Polish prime minister Kazimierz Marcinkiewicz, and the president of Lithuania Valdas Adamkus. In February 2006 he also met the President of the European Commission, José Manuel Barroso, German Chancellor Angela Merkel, Javier Solana, and several other top European politicians. His campaign received the backing first of the Polish government and later that of prominent EU officials.

== Personal life ==
Married to Inna Kuley, he had two sons from a previous marriage. Aside from his native Belarusian Milinkievič also spoke Polish, French, and Russian.

== Persecution ==
In April 2006, Milinkievič was jailed by the government for 15 days for taking part in an unsanctioned rally.

On 23 November 2006 government police detained Milinkievič three times as he traveled around Vitebsk Region with a local opposition activist who was accused of causing a fatal hit-and-run accident in the past. On 29 November 2006 police detained Milinkievič at a Minsk airport after he returned from a NATO summit in Riga. He was accused of having a forged passport.

On 4 December 2006 Milinkievič was detained in Beloozyorsk on suspicion of illegal drug trade activity.

On 6 January 2007 Milinkevich was arrested twice: first on the suspicion of drunk driving (he was found to be sober) and then on the suspicion of being involved in a traffic accident. On 29 January 2007 Milinkevich said he was fined $2,200 after being tried in absentia for leaving Belarus illegally. He called it "revenge by Lukashenko".

== See also ==
- Knight of Freedom Award
