= United Democratic Forces of Belarus =

Belarusian political alliance

- Belarusian name: Аб'яднаныя дэмакратычныя сілы Беларусі
- Russian name: Объединённые демократические силы
- Founded: 2006
- Preceded by: People's Coalition 5 Plus
- Headquarters: Minsk
- Ideology: Anti-Lukashenko; Liberal democracy Pro-Europeanism
- Political position: Big tent
- Colours: Red
- House of Representatives: 0 / 110
- Council of the Republic: 0 / 64

Website
- udf.by

The United Democratic Forces of Belarus (Belarusian: Аб'яднаныя дэмакратычныя сілы Беларусі, romanized: Abjadnanyja demakratyčnyja siły Biełarusi; Russian: Объединённые демократические силы, romanized: Ob"edinyonnye demokraticheskie sily) is a coalition of political parties that oppose the presidency of Alexander Lukashenko, who has been in power since 1994. It was the main opposition group during the 2006 presidential election and chose Alexander Milinkevich as their candidate.

Official Belarusian statistics reported Milinevich gained 6% of the vote, however Belarusian opposition and critics from Western countries have not accepted the official results as legitimate and believe this is an example of election fraudulence. Belarusian authorities have denied all accusations of election fraud.

Currently the United Civic Party and Belarusian Left Party "A Just World" make up the majority of the coalition. The BPF Party keeps its membership in the coalition, however concentrates more on the newly created coalition of conservative parties, the Belarusian Independence Bloc.

== Members ==
- Belarusian Left Party "A Just World"
- United Civic Party of Belarus
- Belarusian Social Democratic Party (Assembly)
- Belarusian Labour Party
- BPF Party
- Movement for Freedom
