= Dzianis =

Dzianis is a given name. Notable people with the given name include:

- Dzianis Hancharonak (born 1988), Belarusian kickboxer
- Dzianis Harazha (born 1987), Belarusian sprint canoer
- Dzianis Krytski (born 1988), Belarusian handball player
- Dzianis Liseichykau (born 1979), Belarusian historian and archivist
- Dzianis Makhlai (born 1990), Belarusian sprint canoeist
- Dzianis Mihal (born 1985), Belarusian rower
- Dzianis Rutenka (born 1986), Belarusian handball player
- Dzianis Simanovich (born 1987), Belarusian racewalker
- Dzianis Zhyhadia, Belarusian sprint canoer
- Dzianis Zuev (born 1988), Belarusian kickboxer
