= Belarusian State University =

University in Minsk, Belarus

- Беларускі дзяржаўны ўніверсітэт
- Type: Public
- Established: October 30, 1921; 104 years ago
- Rector: Andrei Korol
- Administrative staff: 8,032
- Students: 44,877 (incl. 2365 international)
- Undergraduates: 29,655
- Location: Minsk, Belarus
- Campus: 4.58 hectares (11.3 acres) (main); City
- Nobel Laureates: 1
- Colours
- Website: www.bsu.by

University rankings

Global – Overall
- QS World: 387 (2023)

Regional – Overall
- QS Emerging Europe and Central Asia: 22 (2022)

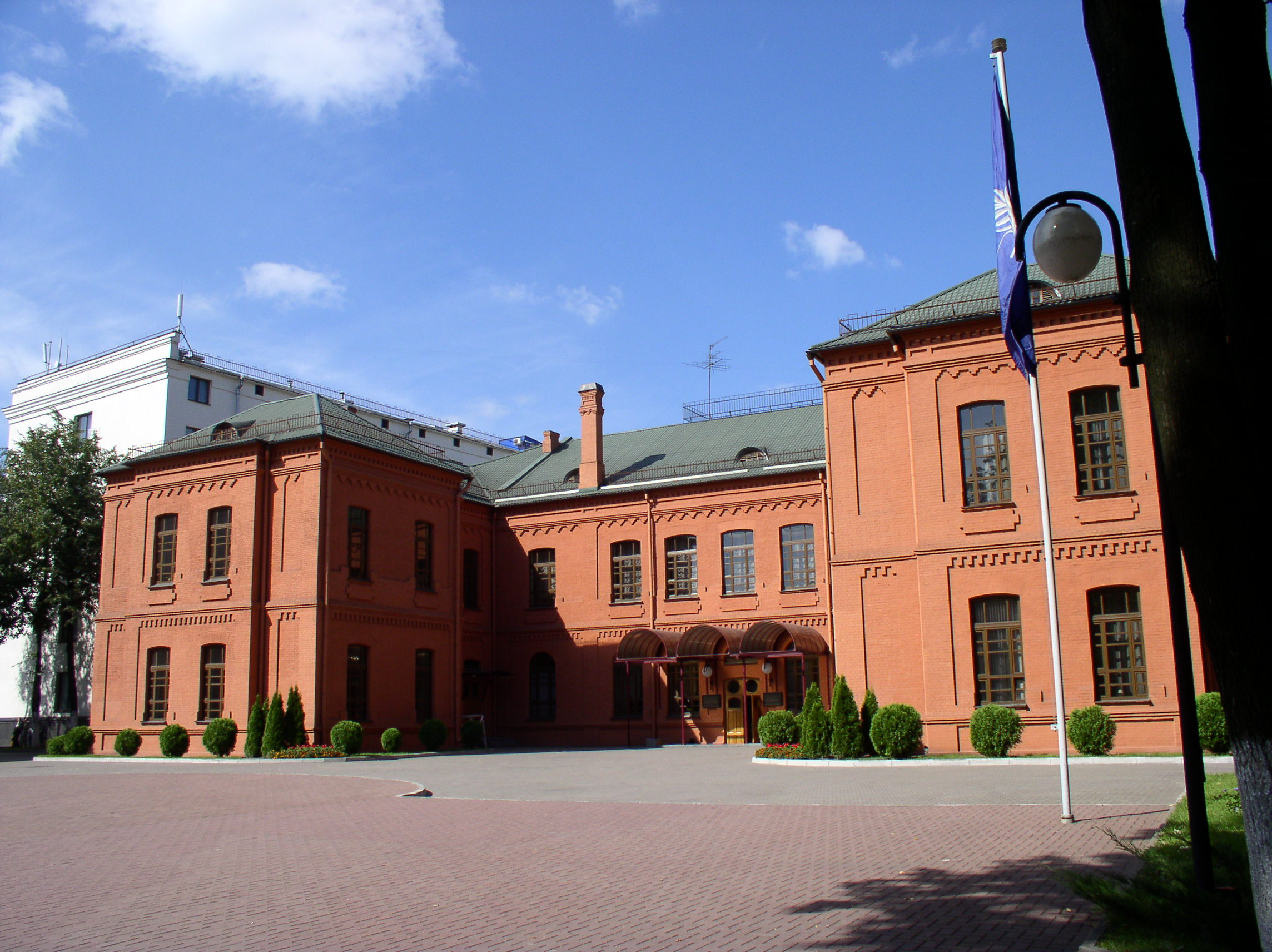
BSU's Rector's Office.

The Belarusian State University (BSU) (Belarusian: Белару́скі дзяржа́ўны ўніверсітэ́т, romanized: Biełaruski dziaržaŭny ŭniviersitet, Belarusian pronunciation: [bʲelaˈruskʲi d͡zʲarˈʒawnɨ wnʲivʲersʲiˈtɛt]; Russian: Белору́сский госуда́рственный университе́т) is a university in Minsk, Belarus. It was founded on October 30, 1921.

== History ==
=== 1919–1949 ===
On February 25, 1919, the Central Executive Committee of the Belorussian SSR resolved to establish the first national university in Belarus. However, the occupation of Minsk by the Polish army delayed these plans, and the university's opening was set back to October 30, 1921.

Initially, the university comprised three faculties (Workers, Medicine, and Humanities) that enrolled a total of 1,390 students. The faculty included 14 professors, 49 lecturers and 10 teaching assistants, most of whom were transferred from the universities of Moscow, Kazan and Kiev. In 1922, the Pedagogical Faculty was established. The first class that counted 34 economists and 26 lawyers graduated in 1925. By 1930, the university consisted of six faculties: Workers, Medicine, Pedagogical, National Economy, Law and Soviet Development, Chemical Technology.

In 1941 the university consisted of six Faculties: Chemistry, Physics and Mathematics, Biology, History, Geography, and Languages. There was also a Workers Faculty that provided part-time education to full-time employees of factories and plants, as well as special part-time Polish- and Yiddish-language sections. After Minsk was occupied by Nazi Germany in June 1941, some students and academic staff were evacuated to the east. In May 1943, the Belarusian State University was re-opened in the town of Skhodnya, 12 km northwest of Moscow. The university relocated back to Minsk in the summer of 1944 and classes resumed. In 1949, the university was named after Vladimir Lenin to commemorate the 30th anniversary of the Byelorussian SSR.

=== 1950–2007 ===
In 1975 the Faculty of Radiophysics and Electronics was split off from the Faculty of Physics, and in 1989 the Faculty of Philosophy and Economics was established. The research institutes for physico-chemical problems and nuclear problems were opened in 1978 and 1986, respectively.

Following Belarus's independence from the USSR in 1991, new faculties and institutes were created: the Faculty of International Relations (1995), the State Institute of Management and Social Technologies (2003), the Military Faculty (2003), the St. Methodius and Cyril Theological Institute (2004), the Faculty of Humanities (2004), the Institute of Business and Technology Management (2006), and the Confucius Institute for Sinology (2007).

Rector Alyaksandr Kazulin was fired in 2003 on accusations of corruption.

=== 2008–present: criticism and political controversies ===
In 2008, the activist Franak Viačorka, a member of Partyja BPF, was expelled from the Journalism Faculty of the Belarusian State University and forced into military service. In the same year, Michaił Paškievič, a member of the United Civic Party and leader of the party's youth wing, was expelled from the BSU History Faculty for political activity.

In 2009, the BSU Law Faculty expelled the student Tatsiana Shaputska, a member of the Malady Front, after her participation in the Civil Society Forum of the Eastern Partnership in Brussels.

As part of the international sanctions against the regime in Belarus following a crackdown of the opposition following the 2010 Belarusian presidential election, Siarhiej Abłamiejka, at that time rector of the Belarusian State University, was banned from entering the European Union. In its decision, the EU Council accused him of being "responsible for the expulsion of several students from the University because they participated in the demonstrations on 19 December 2010 and in other peaceful demonstrations in 2011." It was reported that students were expelled from the Belarusian State University for participating in the protests in 2010 and 2011.

According to reports by human rights organizations, politically motivated expulsions from the Belarusian State University continued also after the EU lifted most of its sanctions against Belarus in 2014.

According to reports by media and human rights organizations, many students of the Belarusian State University are being forced to vote early at elections and referendums, which is considered an essential part of centralized electoral fraud in Belarus. No election or referendum in Belarus has been recognized by the United States, the European Union, or the OSCE as free and fair since the mid-1990s.

In 2020–21, several university teachers were fired for political reasons. A number of students who participated in the protests or openly expressed their civil position were expelled. Professor Svetlana Volchek was arrested for writing to the university leadership expressing concern about police violence during the protests, and found guilty of spreading information about a planned protest.

In 2021, four previously expelled BSU students were sentenced to 2.5 years in prison for protesting in the university and "disruption of the educational process". All of them were recognized as political prisoners. Several BSU employees were witnesses.

Aliaksandr Danilevich, a university professor and a member of the Court of Arbitration for Sport, was arrested by Belarusian police on May 20, 2022. In February 2022 he had signed a petition calling for an end to the 2022 Russian invasion of Ukraine. After he signed the petition the university told him they would not extend his contract; the day before his arrest he had asked for a written explanation to why his contract was ended.

== Ranking ==
In 2023, the university was ranked 387th in the world in the QS World University Rankings.

== Campus ==
The Belarusian State University owns buildings at various locations within the city of Minsk. The main campus is located in the city center. It also offers accommodations in the Student Village on the southwestern outskirts of Minsk. Each of the university study buildings are equipped with classrooms, seminar rooms and reading lounges. There are 70 computer laboratories and 4 media classrooms.

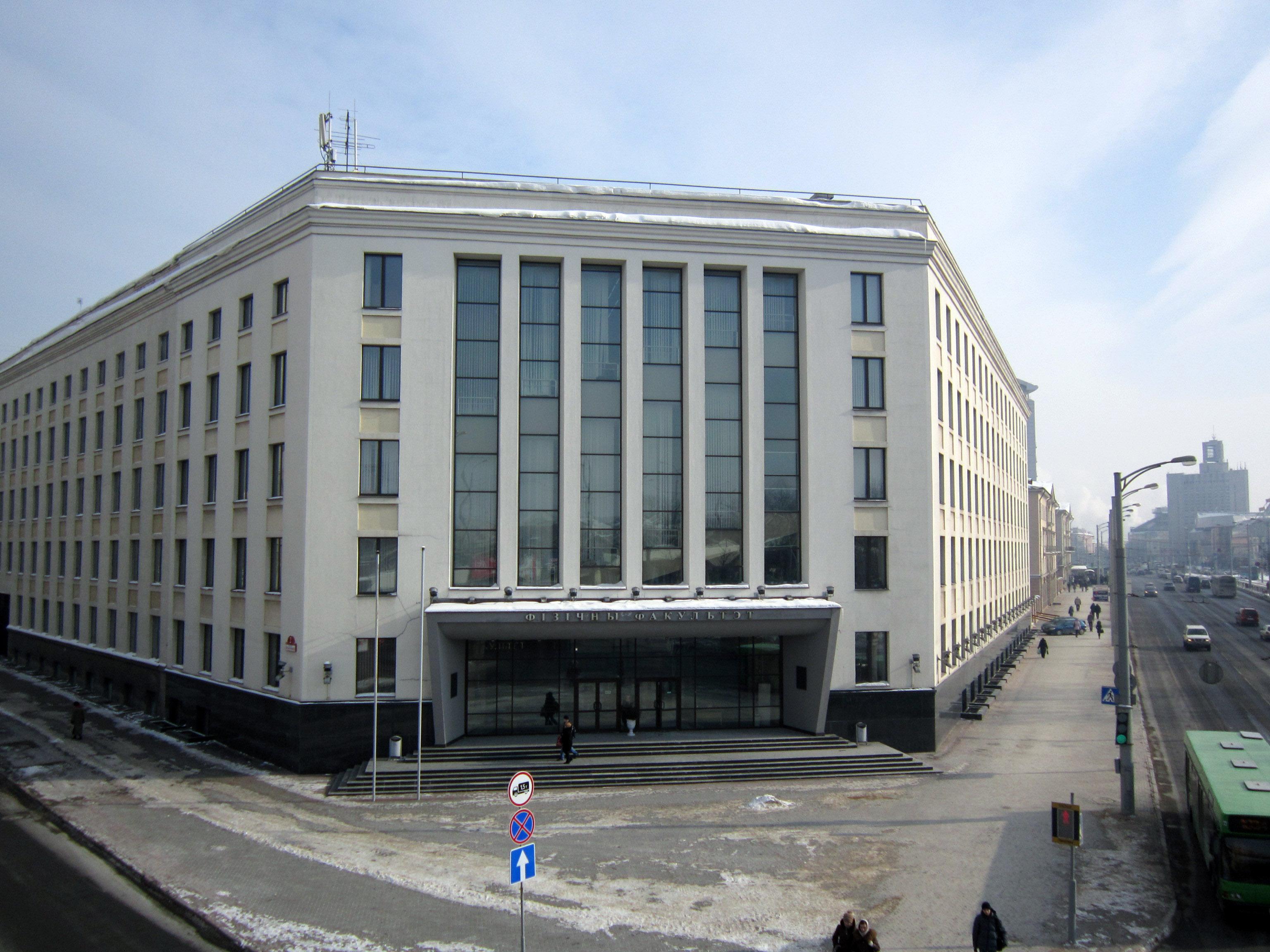
Faculty of Physics

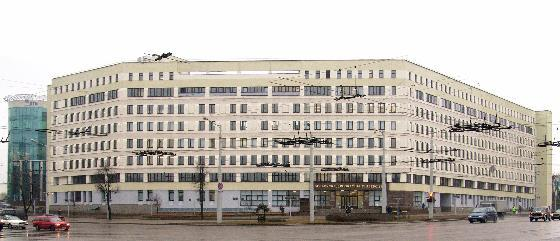
Institute of Journalistics, Faculty of Philosophy and Social Science

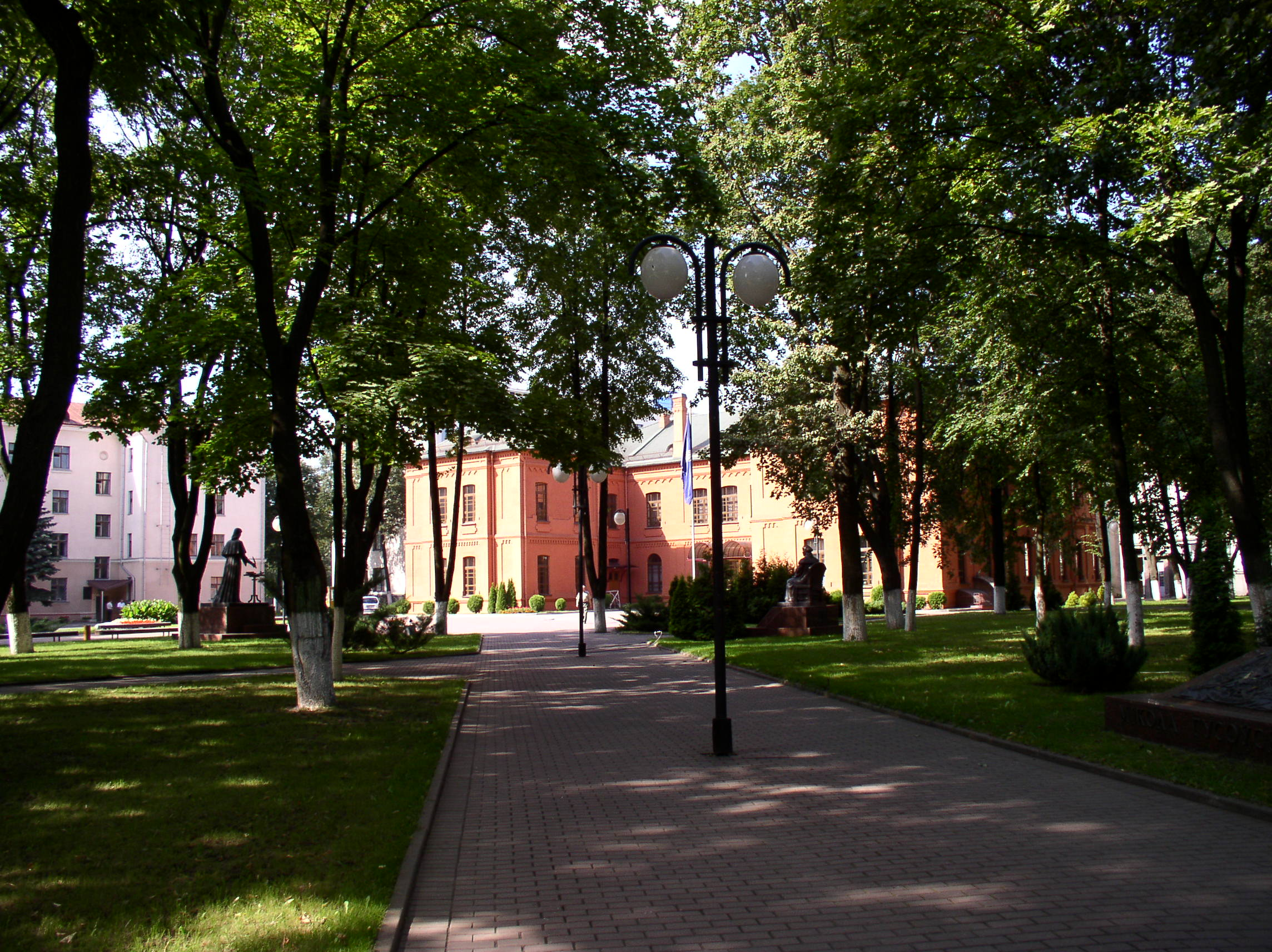
Quad on the main campus

The BSU is a complex of academic, research, production, social and cultural, administrative, auxiliary and other units. There are 16 Faculties within the university structure. BSU has 4 Educational Institutes that provide training on undergraduate and post-graduate levels of education. There are a number of Institutes that conduct retraining and advanced training of both youths and adults.

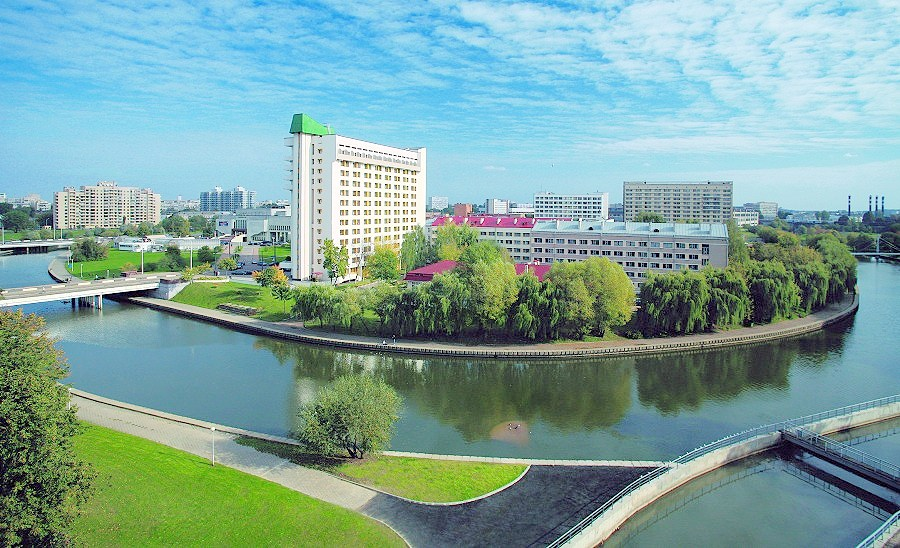
Downtown housing facilities

The BSU has 11 student dormitories. About 65% of housing provided by the university consists of rooms shared by 3-4 persons with a common kitchen and sanitary arrangements.

The BSU has created sports and recreation facilities for its students and staff. Training and health-improving complexes are available.

=== Military faculty ===
The Military Faculty of the Belarusian State University was established on 4 November 1926, by order of the Soviet Revolutionary Military Council. In 1941, at the outset of the Second World War, military training classes were interrupted only to be resumed in 1943. In the post-war years, the military department continued to train reserve officers in accounting specialties. In 2003, the military department was reorganized into the modern military faculty of BSU.

== Scientific research institutes ==
- Research Institute of Nuclear Problems
- Research Institute of physics-chemistry problems
- Research Institute of applied physics problems
- Research Institute of applied problems of Mathematics and informatics

=== National research centers ===
- National Research Center of Ozonosphere monitoring
- National Scientific and Educational Center of Particles and High-Energy Physics Republican Research Centers
- Republican Center for Human Studies

=== Inter-departmental centers ===
- Inter-departmental Center of national parks and preserves
- Inter-departmental Center research center Life Safety

=== Centers of sharing use of unique research equipment ===
- Belarusian inter-university center of research facilities
- Center of sharing use of devices and equipment of faculty of biology
- Laboratory of physical-and-chemical methods of research RI PCP
- Center of nanotechnologies and physical electronics

=== BSU research centers ===
- Center of Applied Problems of Mathematics and Informatics
- Education Development Center
- Center for youth studies
- Center of Sociological and Political studies
- Center for international studies
- Center for international technologies
- Center of informational resources and communications
- Center of IT security
- Childhood development Center
- Center for Olympic training

Research activity is conducted on the basis of 25 research centers and 115 scientific laboratories. On top of that, the university has four research institutes:

- Research Institute of Applied Physical Problems named after A.N. Sieŭčanka
- Research Institute for Nuclear Problems of Belarusian State University
- Research Institute Of Physical And Chemical Problems
- Research Institute of Applied Mathematics and Informatics

The BSU complex also includes 12 unitary scientific-productional enterprises, among them are the following:

- Unitehprom BSU (Small-scale chemical and equipment production of various purpose);
- Unihimprom BSU (Development of the technology of diesel biofuel production from vegetable oils and other accompanying products);
- Unidragmet BSU (treatment of man-caused waste containing precious and non-ferrous metals treatment);
- Adamas BSU (Production of diamond monocrystals and instruments made of them);
- Engineering department of BSU (Production of computers, traffic controllers and systems of traffic control, software&hardware for medical experts);
- Active BSU (production of training devices for physical experiment, vacuum engineering and forage additives;
- Sand BSU (production of tests systems for drug detection).

== Academic community ==
The core of the BSU is made of the academic community of teachers, researches, students and postgraduate students. In 2009 approximately 60% of the secondary school graduates from the country's regions were accepted for the full-time budget form of education. On the selection tours of the World Programming Championship BSU team always reaches the finals and gets into the top-20 teams of world.

== Programs ==
The BSU offers a variety of educational programs. The Higher Education Program is organized at the BSU major Faculties and Educational Institutes through 56 specialities and more than 250 specialisations. Training along the Magister's Degree Program is conducted through 48 specialities.

== International cooperation ==
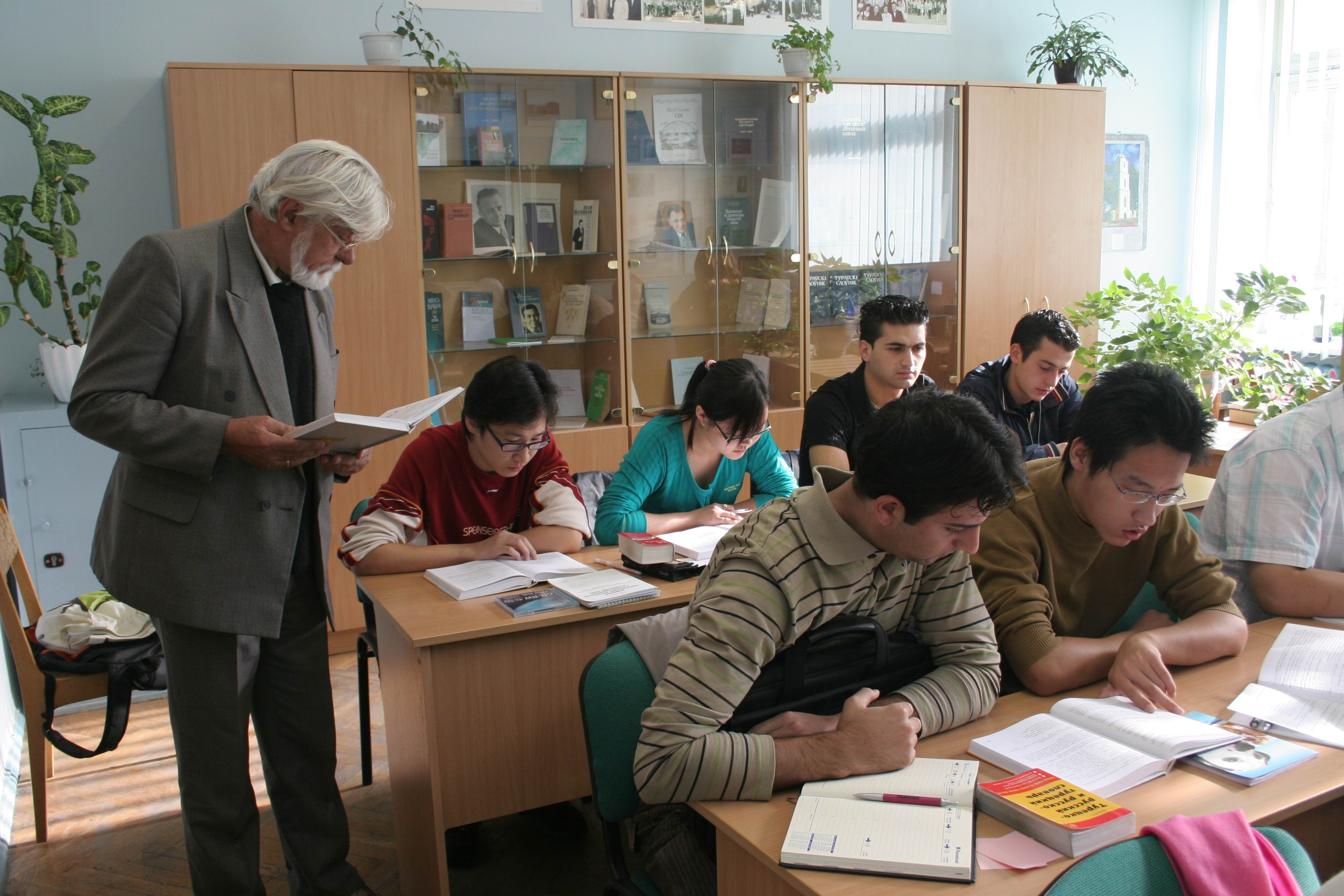
International students of the BSU

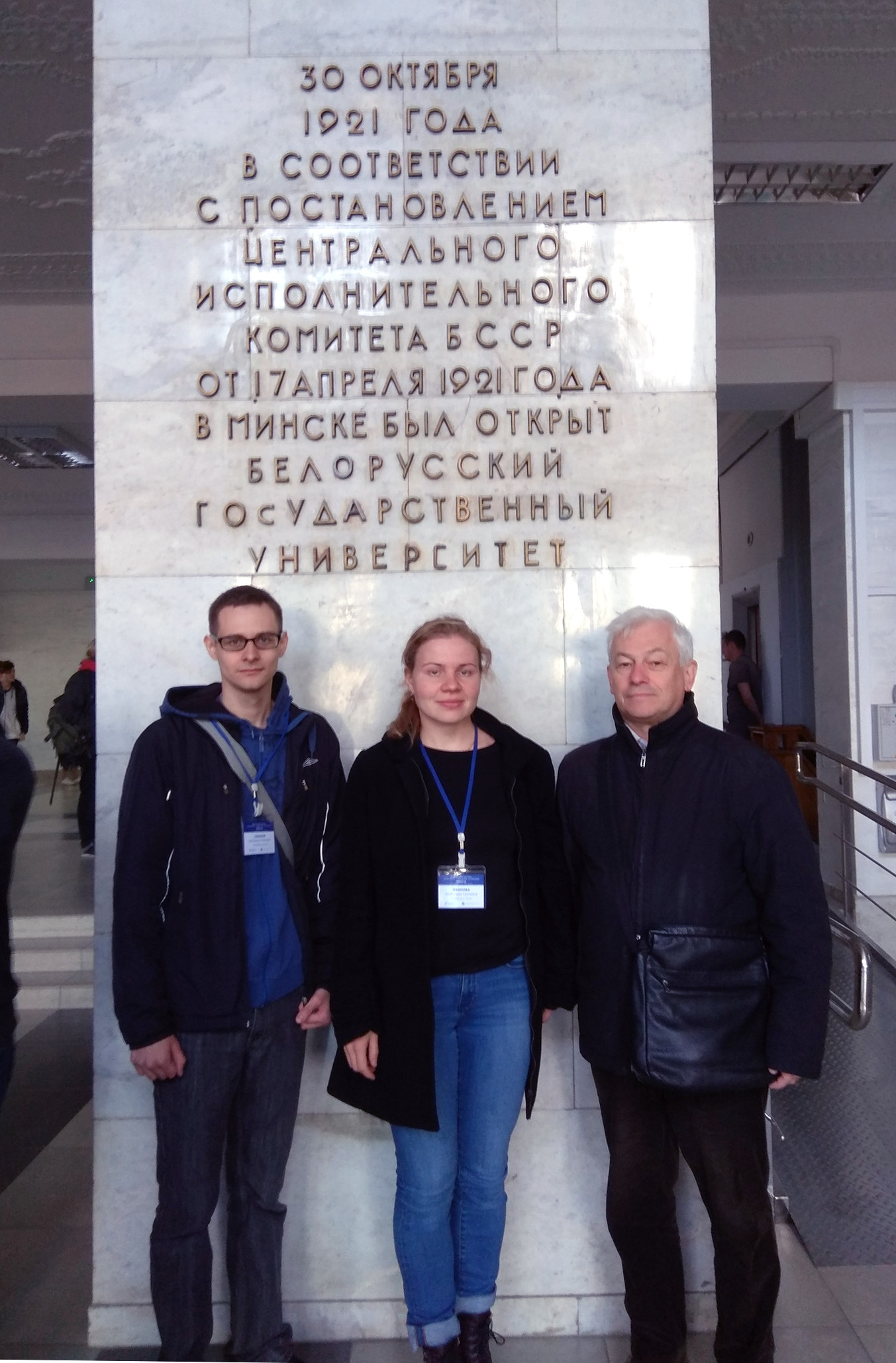
International conference and researchers from Karelian Research Centre of RAS, 2018

In late 1950s BSU became an international university with hundreds of international students. More than 4,000 students from over 102 countries of the world have studied at the BSU during Soviet times until the late 1990s. The Belarusian State University takes active part in international university networks and associations. It is an individual full member of the European University Association.

== Library ==
The BSU Fundamental Library's (BSU FL) has 820 readers’ places, 140 workers, 9 home loan departments, 17 departmental and specialised reading rooms. The following digital recourses are available for students and faculty:

- The Open Public Access Catalog (OPAC) of the Belarusian State University Fundamental Library.
- Electronic Document Delivery Service - Gives opportunity to search, order and delivery of electronic copies of documents that are contained in the funds of BSU FL and its partners-libraries.
- Databases. Access to the network (local and utter by licenses) databases.
- Digitized collections. Educational and research information materials, publications and BSU conferences’ proceedings. Documents are put on the network in accordance with the copyright law acting on the territory of the Republic of Belarus.
- Virtual exhibitions.

== Notable alumni ==
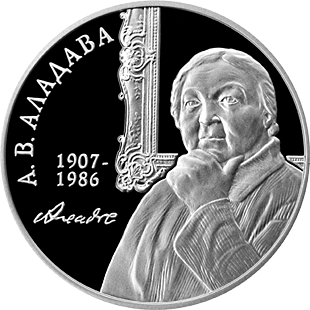
Alena Aladava

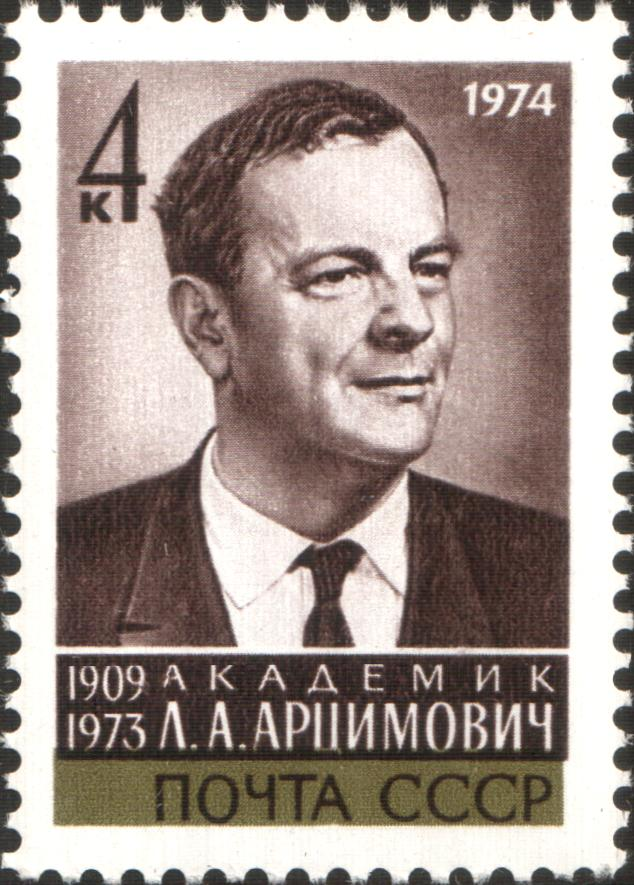
Lev Artsimovich

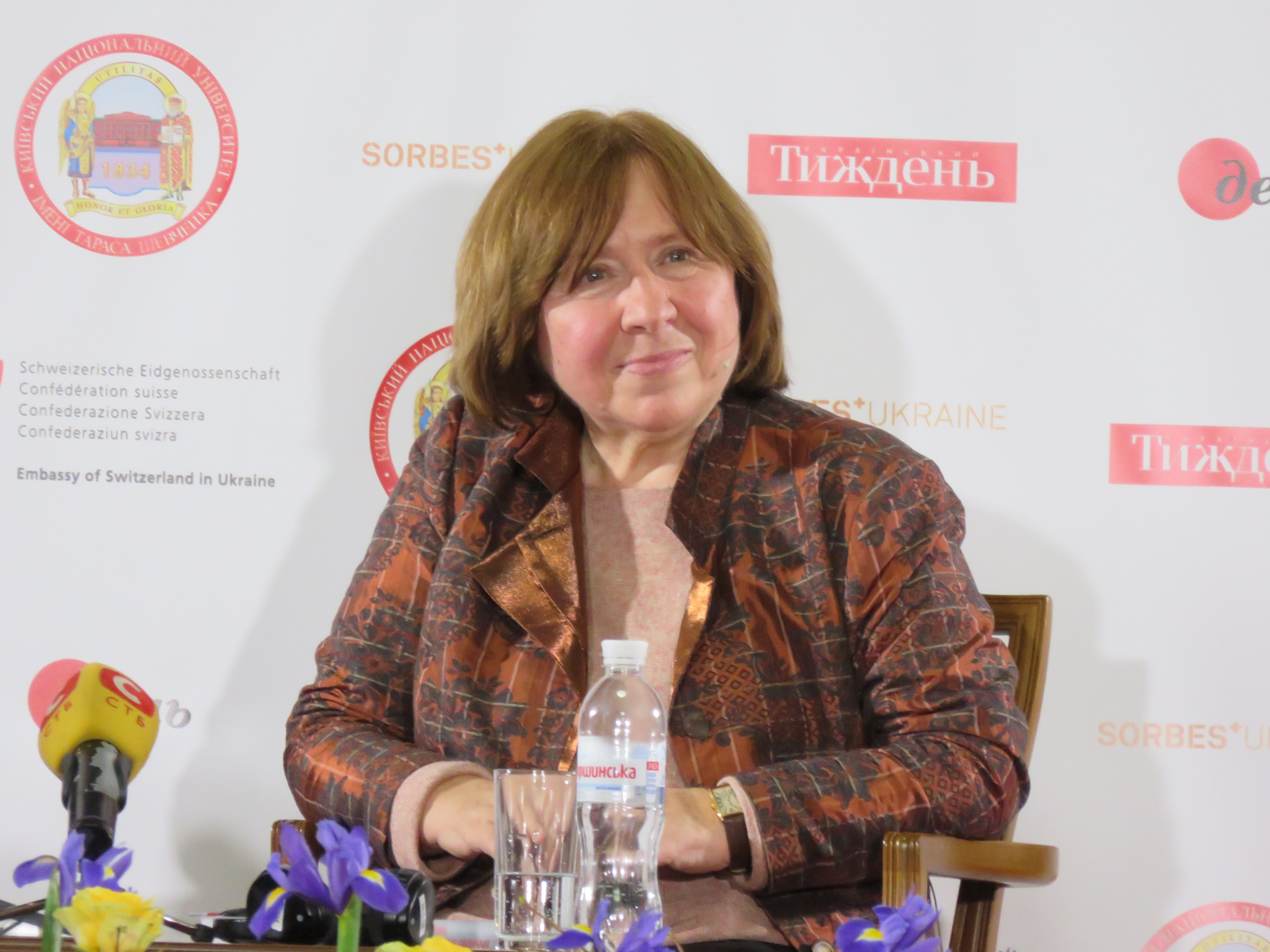
Svetlana Alexievich

- Alena Aladava (1907-1986) - Director of the Belarusian National Arts Museum
- Lev Artsimovich (1909–1973) - physicist, academician of the Academy of Sciences of the Soviet Union, member of the Presidium of the Soviet Academy of Sciences, and Hero of Socialist Labour
- Fiodar Fiodaraŭ (1911-1994) - physicist, predicted Imbert–Fiodaraŭ effect
- Ivan Mielež (1921-1976) - writer of fiction and drama
- Aleś Adamovič (1927-1994) - writer and critic
- Adam Suprun (1928-1999) - linguist, slavist
- Efraim Sevela (1928–2010) - Soviet-Israeli writer, screenwriter, director, and producer
- Anatol Hryckievič (1929-2015) - historian
- Maria Itkina (1932–2020) - runner, set multiple world records in various sprint events, competed at the 1956, 1960, and 1964 Olympics and finished four times in fourth place.
- Zinaida Mozheiko (1933–2014) - ethnomusicologist of Belarusian folk music
- Stanisłaŭ Šuškievič (1934–2022) - politician and scientist, the first leader and head of state of independent Belarus after the dissolution of the Soviet Union
- Ivan Chigrinov (1934-1996) - writer
- Hienadź Buraŭkin (1936-2016) - diplomat and poet
- Miečysłaŭ Hryb (born 1938) - politician, Chairman of the Supreme Soviet of Belarus
- Svetlana Alexievich (born 1948) - journalist and author, winner of Nobel Prize in Literature 2015
- Boris Mordukhovich (born 1948) - mathematician, professor at Wayne State University
- Uładzimier Arłoŭ (born 1953) - historian, writer, politician, and poet
- Barys Tasman (born 1954) - journalist, sports writer
- Elena Korosteleva (born 1972) - political scientist and director of the Institute for Global Sustainable Development at the University of Warwick
- Iryna Chalip (born 1967) - journalist
- Sunday Adelaja (born 1967) - Nigerian journalist, pastor
- Volha Čuprys (born 1969) - academic, first female vice rector of this university
- Natalla Piatkievič (born 1972) - politician and stateswoman
- Yury Ambrazevich (born 1975) - politician and diplomat
- Ilya Nemenman (born 1975) - Belarusian-American theoretical physicist at Emory University, where he is a Winship Distinguished Research Professor of Physics and Biology
- Pavał Sieviaryniec (born 1976) - politician
- Dzianis Liseichykau (born 1979) - historian and archivist
- Artur Granz (born 1971) - businessman
- Slavamir Adamovich (born 1962) - Belarusian poet, publicist, and translator of Norwegian literature
- Ludmila Hraznova (born 1953) - Belarusian economist, opposition politician, and human rights defender

== Rectors ==
- Uładzimier Pičeta (1921–1929)
- Jazep Karanieŭski (1929–1931)
- Ivan Jermakoŭ (1931–1934)
- Anani Dziakaŭ (1934–1935)
- Alaksiej Kučynski (1936–1937)
- Ničypar Bładyka (1937)
- Uładzimier Babraŭnicki (1938)
- Parfion Savicki (1938–1944)
- Uładzimier Tamaševič (1946–1949)
- Ivan Čymburh (1949–1952)
- Kanstancin Łukašoŭ (1952–1957)
- Anton Sieŭčanka (1957–1972)
- Usievaład Sikorski (1972–1978)
- Uładzimier Bieły (1978–1983)
- Leanid Kisialeŭski (1983–1989)
- Fiodar Kapucki (1990–1995)
- Alaksandar Kazulin (1996–2003)
- Vasil Stražaŭ (2003–2008)
- Siarhiej Abłamiejka (2008-2017)
- Andrei Korol (from 2017)
