= Artur Grants =

American businessman and publisher

- Born: Artur Gurgenovich Grants; May 5, 1971 (age 54)
- Occupation: businessman
- Known for: co-owner of BF&GH Travel Retail Limited, publisher of Forbes Ukraine

Artur Grants (Patronymic: Gurgenovich; born May 5, 1971) is a businessman, co-owner of BF&GH Travel Retail Limited, publisher of Forbes Ukraine.

== Early life ==
He was born on May 5, 1971. He graduated from the Belarusian State University in Minsk. He has been doing business in Ukraine since 2006.

== Business activities ==
=== BF&GH Travel Retail Limited ===
Grants is a co-owner of the largest Ukrainian chain of duty-free stores BF&GH Travel Retail Limited, which is a part of BF Capital Group.

In 2014, the company won tenders for a ten-year lease of 15 thousand square meters in terminals D and F of Boryspil airport. BF&GH Travel Retail Limited is an operator of duty-free stores in Boryspil and Zhuliany international airports in partnership with the German company Gebr. Heinemann.

During the period of cooperation between BF&GH Travel Retail Limited and Gebr. Heinemann, about UAH 1 billion of taxes and social payments, and about UAH 2.7 billion for renting space at the airports of Kyiv and Odesa have been paid in Ukraine.

In 2021, it became known that BF&GH Travel Retail Limited would take on lease part of the terminal of Lviv Airport.

According to Artur Grants, despite the COVID-19 pandemic, the companies BF&GH Travel Retail Limited and Gebr. Heinemann paid UAH 177 million in taxes in 2020 and UAH 182 million for 8 months of 2021.

=== Forbes Ukraine ===
He has been the publisher of Forbes Ukraine magazine since spring 2020. The right to publish the magazine was received by Uyavy! LLC, the ultimate beneficiaries of which are Grants and Volodymyr Fedoryn (editor-in-chief of the previous version of Forbes Ukraine).

In 2023, the Forbes Ukraine team received the Forbes Courage Award for resilience, courage and adaptability. The award was presented during the ninth Forbes Global Partners Summit in New York.
