= Yanka Kupala State University of Grodno =

Public university in Grodno, Belarus

- Гродзенскі дзяржаўны ўнівэрсітэт імя Янкі Купалы, Гродненский государственный университет имени Янки Купалы
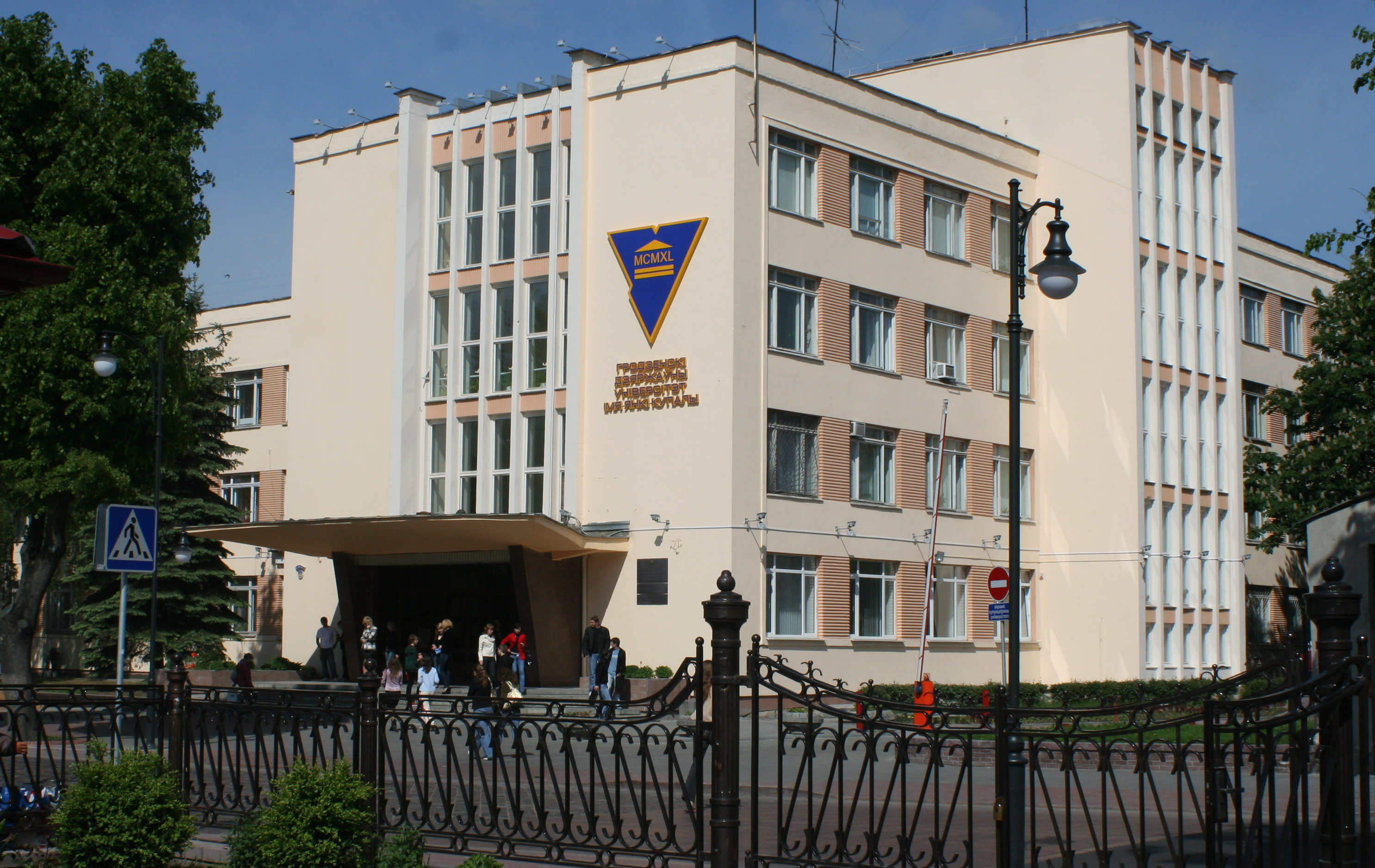
- The main building of the Yanka Kupala State University of Grodno
- Motto: Выявить, раскрыть и реализовать потенциал человека и университета в пространстве межкультурного диалога
- Motto in English: High-quality education, research, modern technologies - for good of a person, society and nation.
- Type: Public
- Established: 22 February 1940; 86 years ago
- Academic affiliations: Compostela Group of Universities
- Rector: Iryna Kiturka
- Students: 11,331
- Undergraduates: 10,763
- Postgraduates: 568
- Doctoral students: 1
- Location: Grodno, Grodno Region, Belarus; 53.68479930°N 23.84018080°E
- Campus: Urban
- Website: en.grsu.by/index.php?lang=en

University rankings

Regional – Overall
- QS Emerging Europe and Central Asia: 199 (2022)

Yanka Kupala State University of Grodno (Belarusian: Гродзенскі дзяржаўны унівэрсітэт імя Янкі Купалы; Russian: Гродненский государственный университет имени Янки Купалы) is а higher education institution located in Grodno, Belarus. It is the largest regional higher education institution in the country, integrating all levels of education. It is named after the poet and writer Yanka Kupala.

According to the international Webometrics ranking (July 2011), YKSUG ranks second among Belarusian universities and 3103 among 12 000 world universities.

It is the second (after BSU) education institution in the Republic of Belarus where the system of electronic student identification card was introduced.

== University Rectors ==
- Samuił Raskin (1940)
- Dziamiencij Kardaš (1940-1941)
- Mikałaj Ułasaviec (1944-1949)
- Josif Malukievič (1949-1955)
- Dźmitry Markoŭski (1955-1973)
- Alaksandar Badakoŭ (1973-1994)
- Leanid Kivač (1994-1997)
- Siarhiej Maskievič (1997-2005)
- Jaŭhien Roŭba (2005-2013)
- Andrei Korol (2013-2017)
- Iryna Kiturka (since 2017)

== History ==
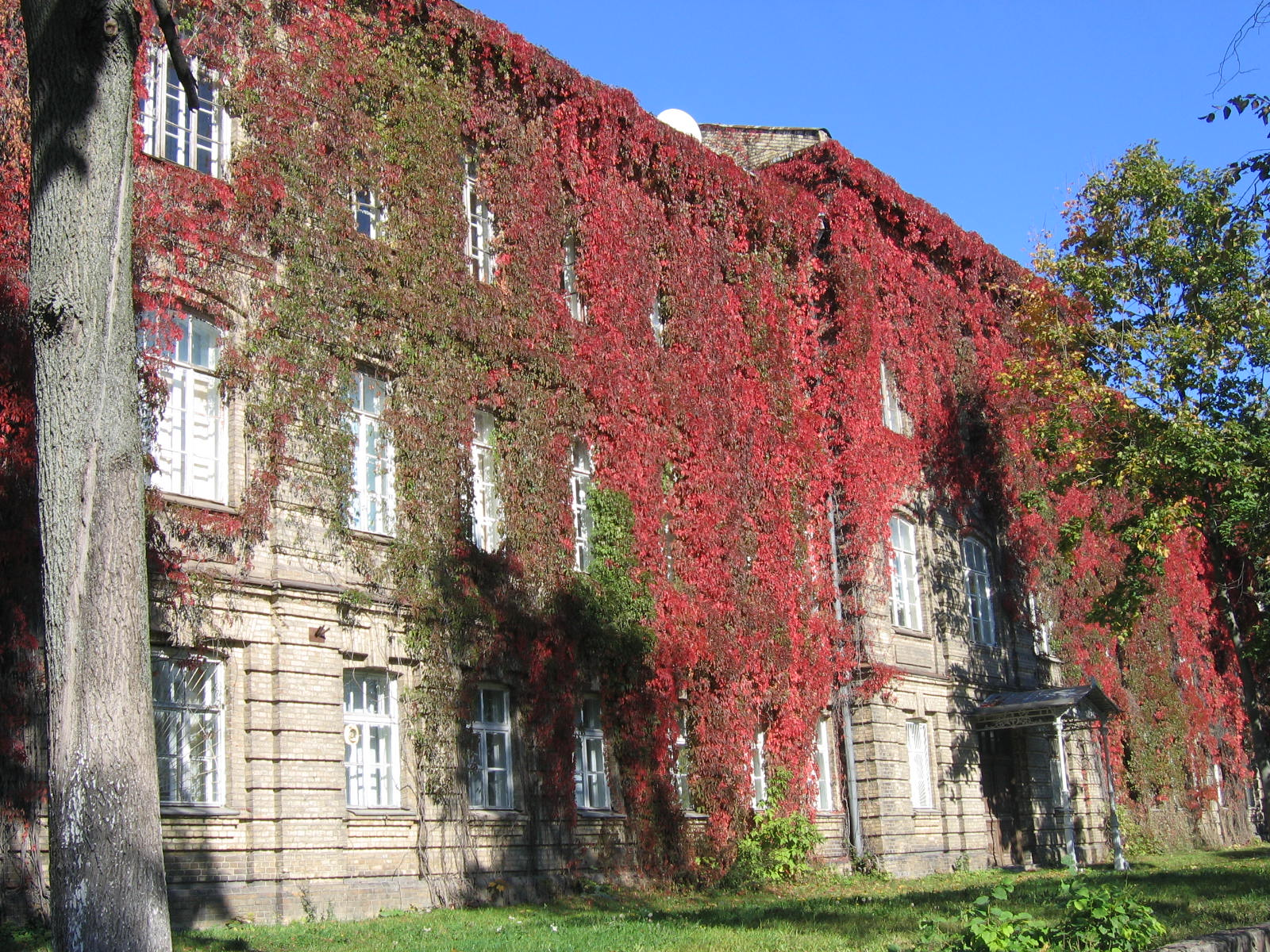
The old part of the Yanka Kupala University's main building

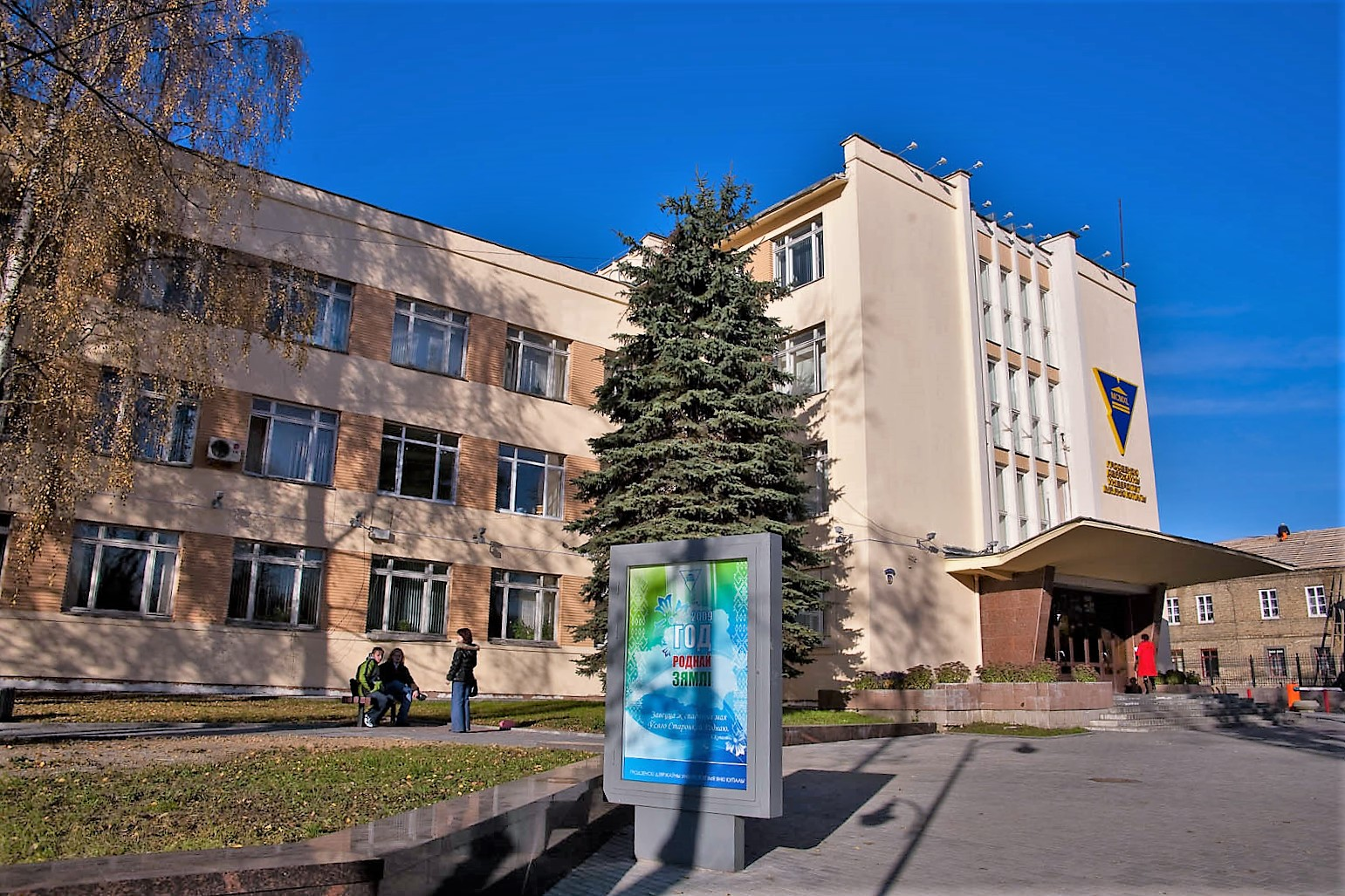
The entrance to the main building

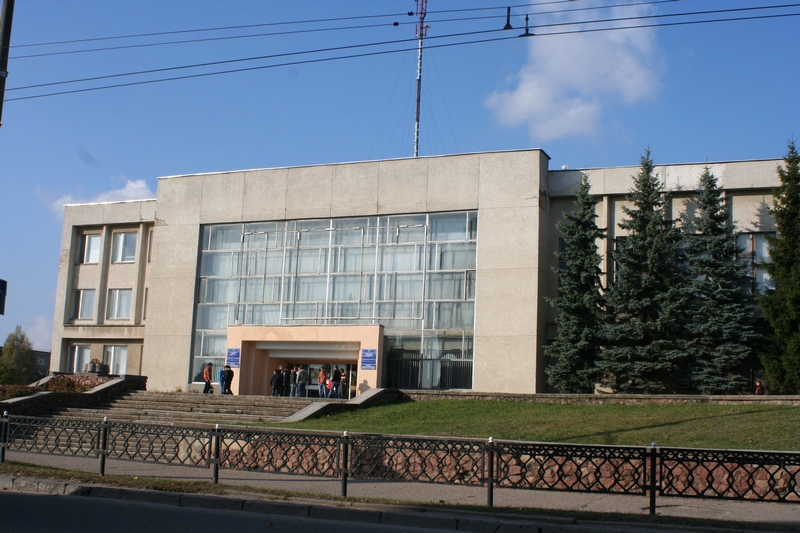
Building of the Institute for professional skills upgrading and retraining

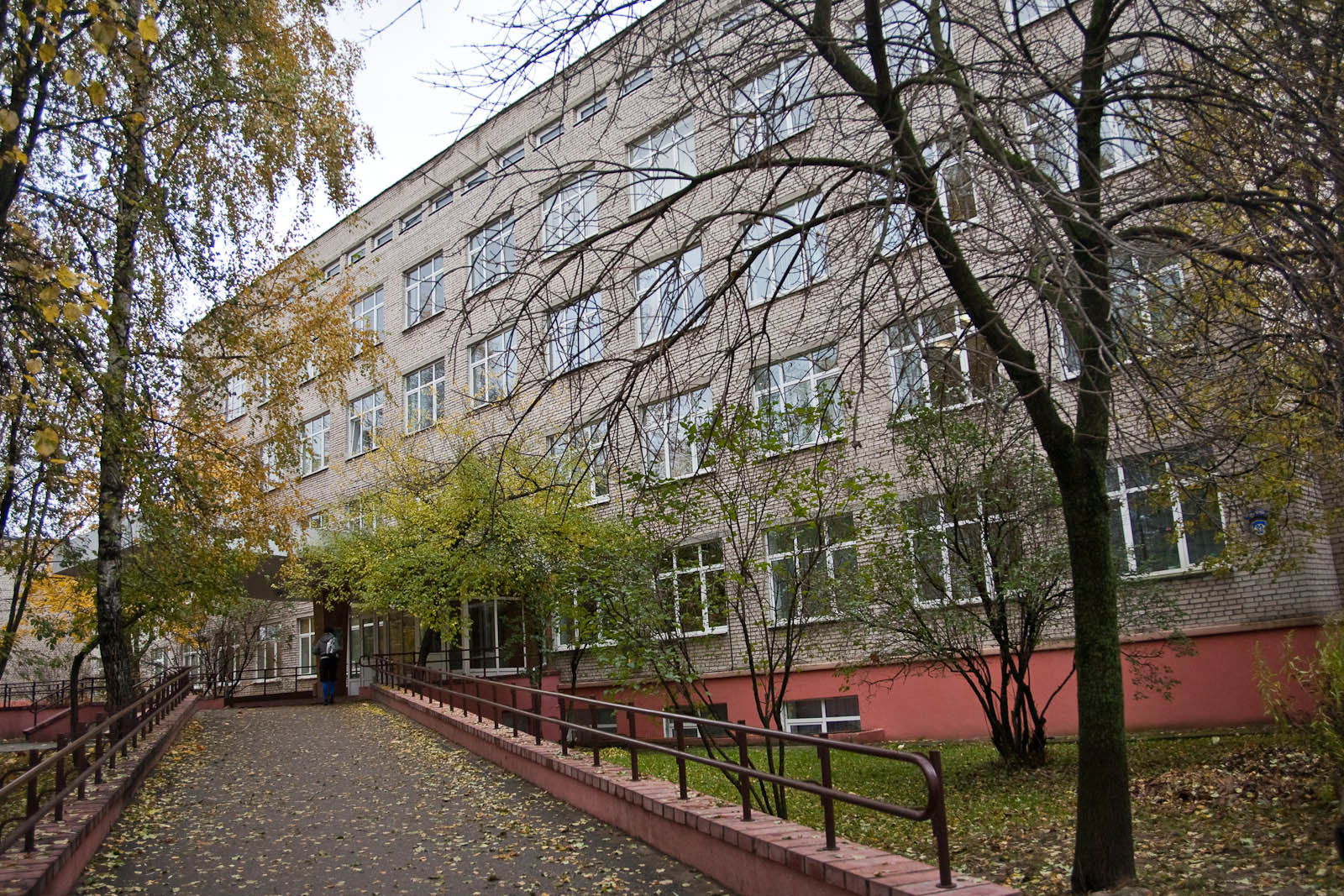
Faculty of Pedagogy

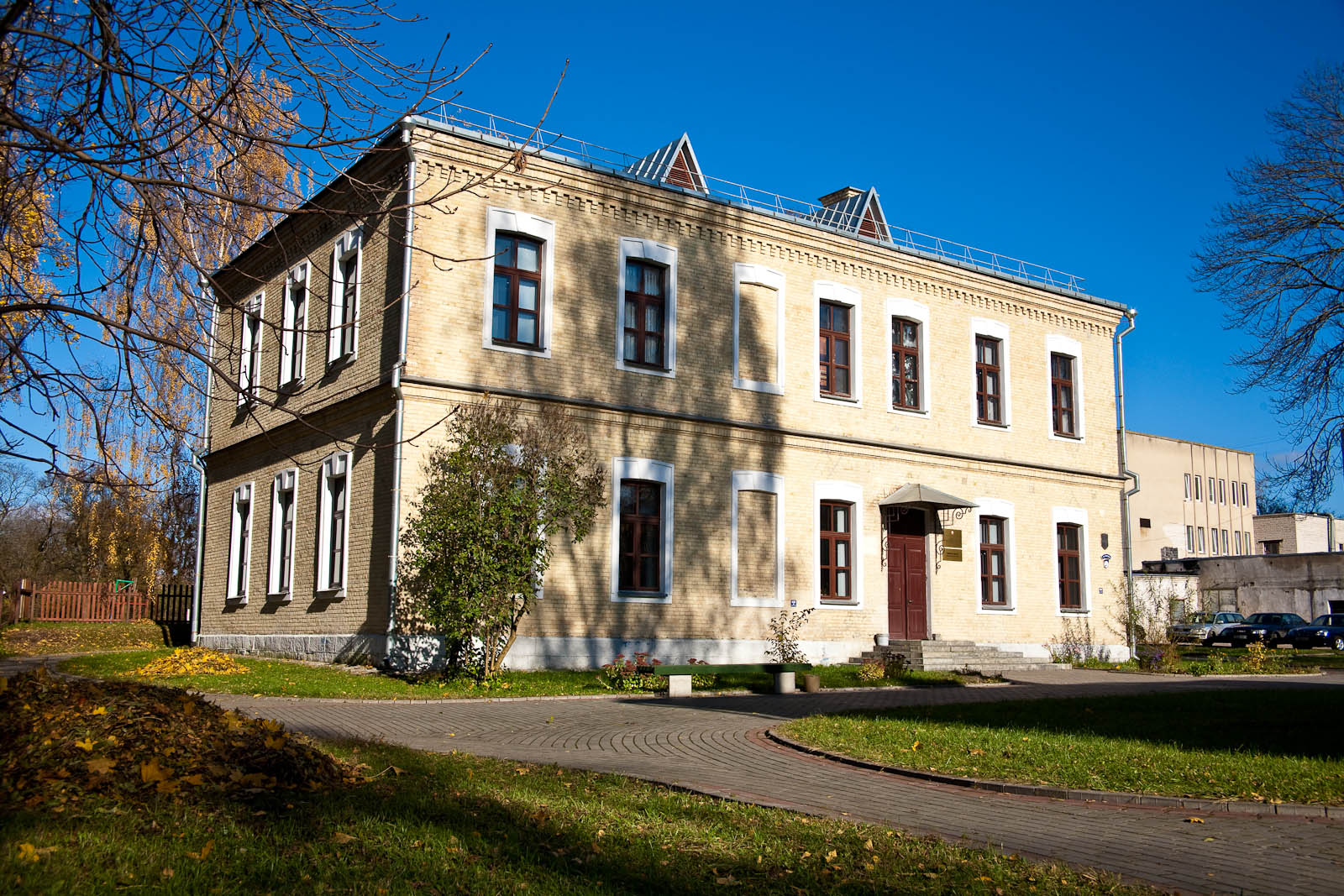
Faculty of Arts and Design

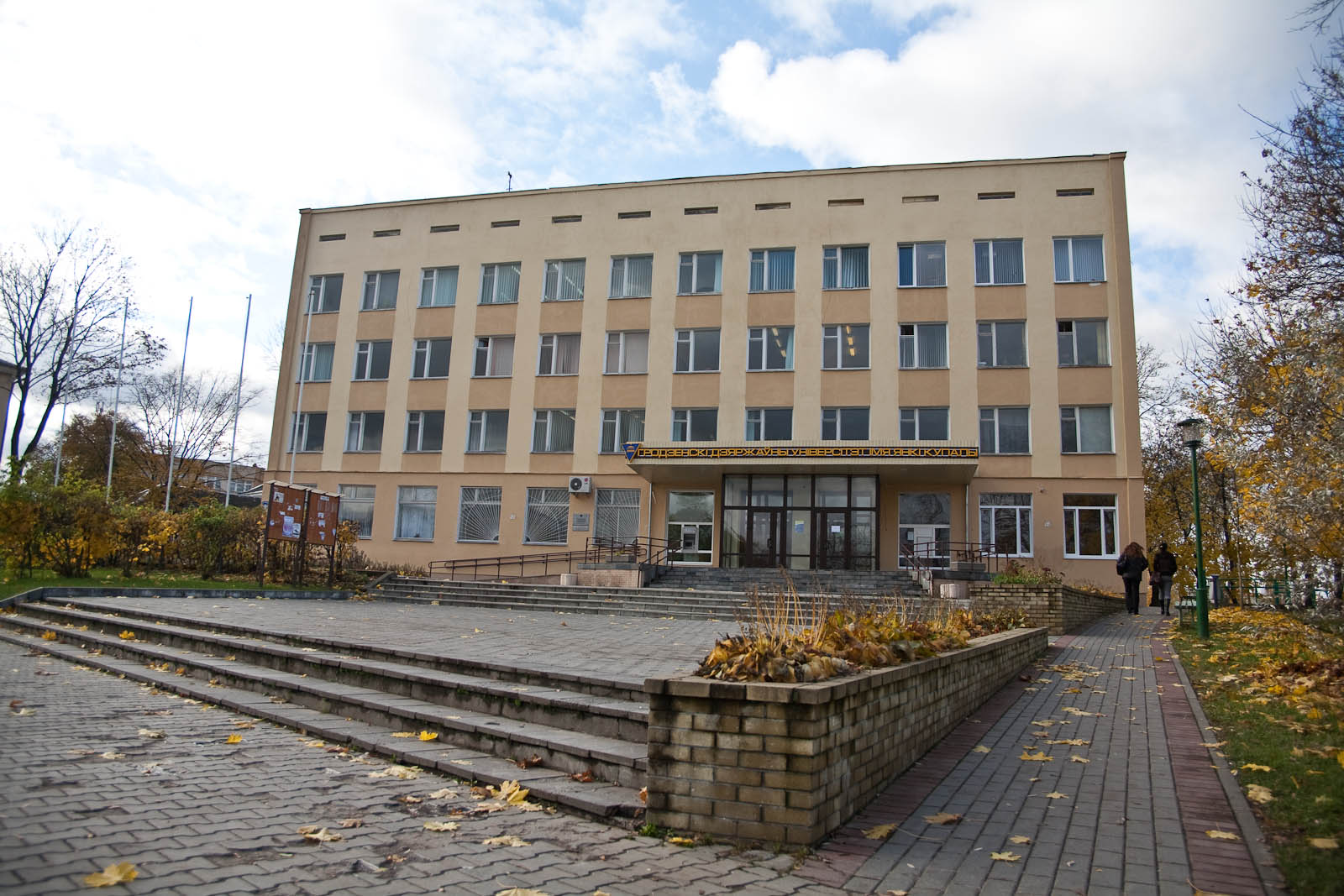
Faculty of Philology

On February 22, 1940, by the decision of the Council of People's Commissars of the BSSR Teachers' Training Institute was founded in Hrodna/Grodno. It ceased its development because of the German-Soviet War. Already in 1944 the studies continued, and the Teachers' Institute was reorganized into a pedagogical (with three Faculties – Physics and Mathematics, Faculty of Literature and Foreign languages Faculty). In 1957 the institute was honored with the name of Yanka Kupala. In 1967 the first defence of doctoral thesis took place in the institute, and in 1969 postgraduate studies were introduced. On May 1, 1978, Pedagogical Institute was reorganized into the Yanka Kupala State University of Grodno.

In 2011, it was the first university, among higher education institutions of the country, which became the winner of the national contest "Prize of the Government of the Republic of Belarus for achievements in quality".

In 2011, the Yanka Kupala State University of Grodno received the status of scientific organization.

In 2010, the Yanka Kupala University was the first university, among the regional universities of Belarus, which received national and international certificates of quality management system meeting the requirements of STB ISO 9001-2009 and ISO 9001:2008 (series of standards ISO 9000).

In the aftermath of the disputed 2020 presidential election, the BSU leadership reported that from August 9, 2020 to August 2023, 50 employees were dismissed from BSU for political reasons, two received remarks, and three received reprimands. In addition, 140 students were expelled.

== The University today ==
At present, there are: 17 098 students, 284 master students, 162 post-graduate students, 40 professors, 261 associate professors and 316 candidates of sciences. The university comprises 17 faculties and 79 departments. The university research library has more than 700 000 books.

=== Faculties ===
- Faculty of Biology and Ecology
- Military Faculty
- Faculty of Arts and Design
- Faculty of History and Sociology
- Faculty of Mathematics and Information Science
- Faculty of Pedagogy
- Faculty of Psychology
- Faculty of Engineering
- Faculty of Physical Training
- Faculty of Philology
- Faculty of Economics and Management
- Faculty of Law

In addition, the university comprises the Regional Centre for Testing and Youth Career Orientation, the Institute for Professional Skills Upgrading and Retraining and colleges:

- Vaŭkavysk College
- Humanitarian College
- Technological college
- Lida College

=== Logotype of the university and faculties ===
The logotype of the university and faculties is a stylized letter “У” of the Cyrillic alphabet with certain symbols in the centre.

== Alumni ==
- Danuta Bičel-Zahnietava - poet
- Ivan Cichan - athlete
- Alaksiej Karpiuk - writer
- Volha Korbut – gymnast
- Ivan Lepiešaŭ - linguist

== See also ==
- Mikola Silčanka — former professor

== Photos ==
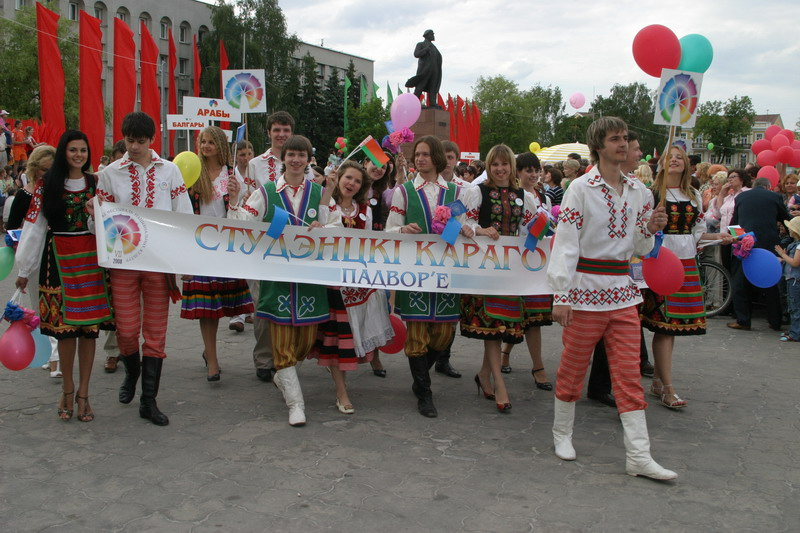

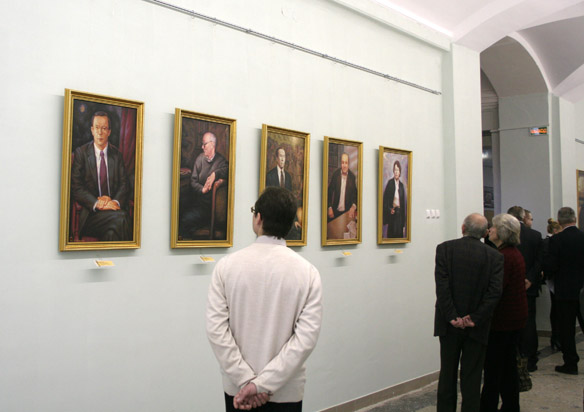

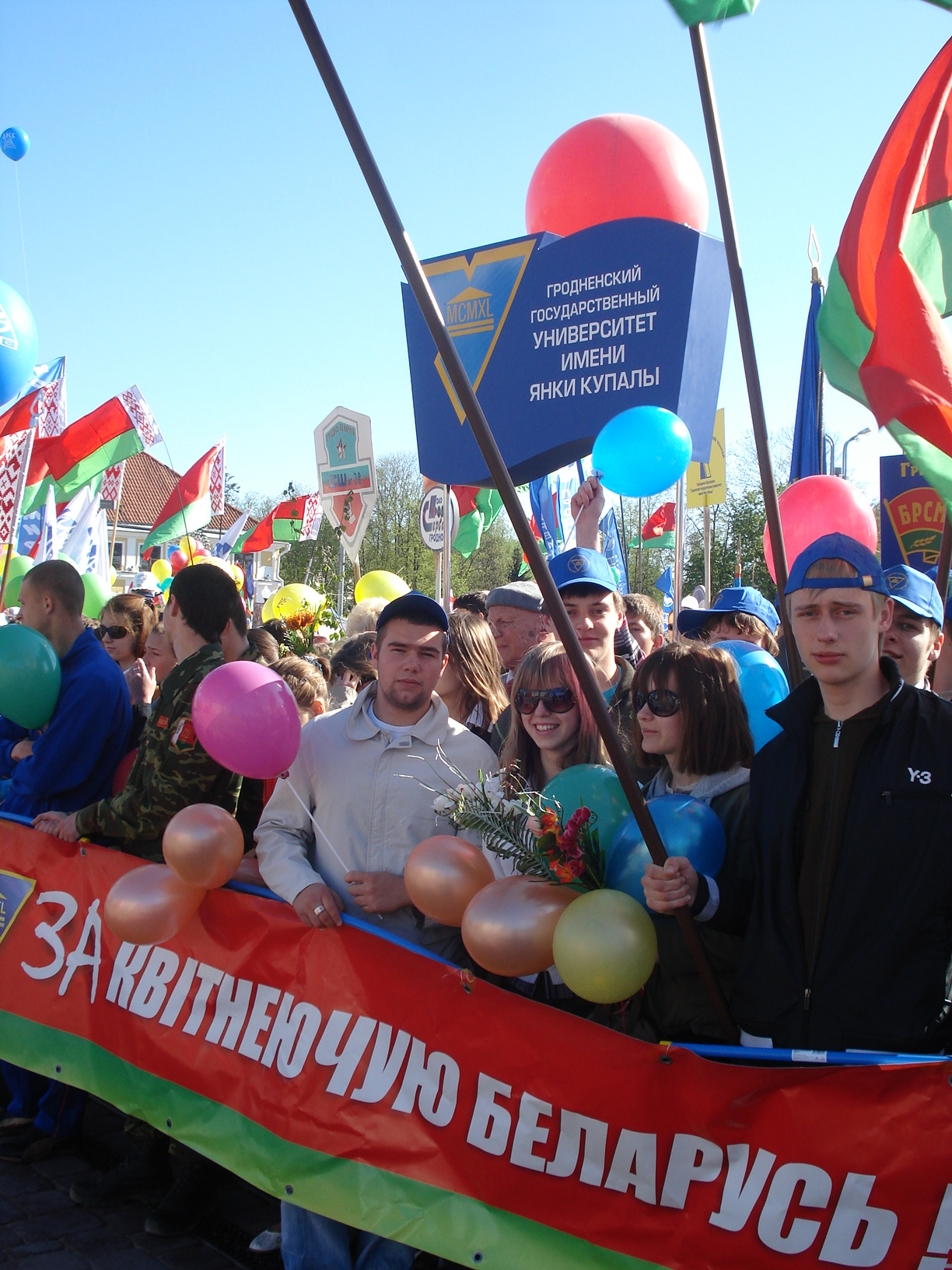

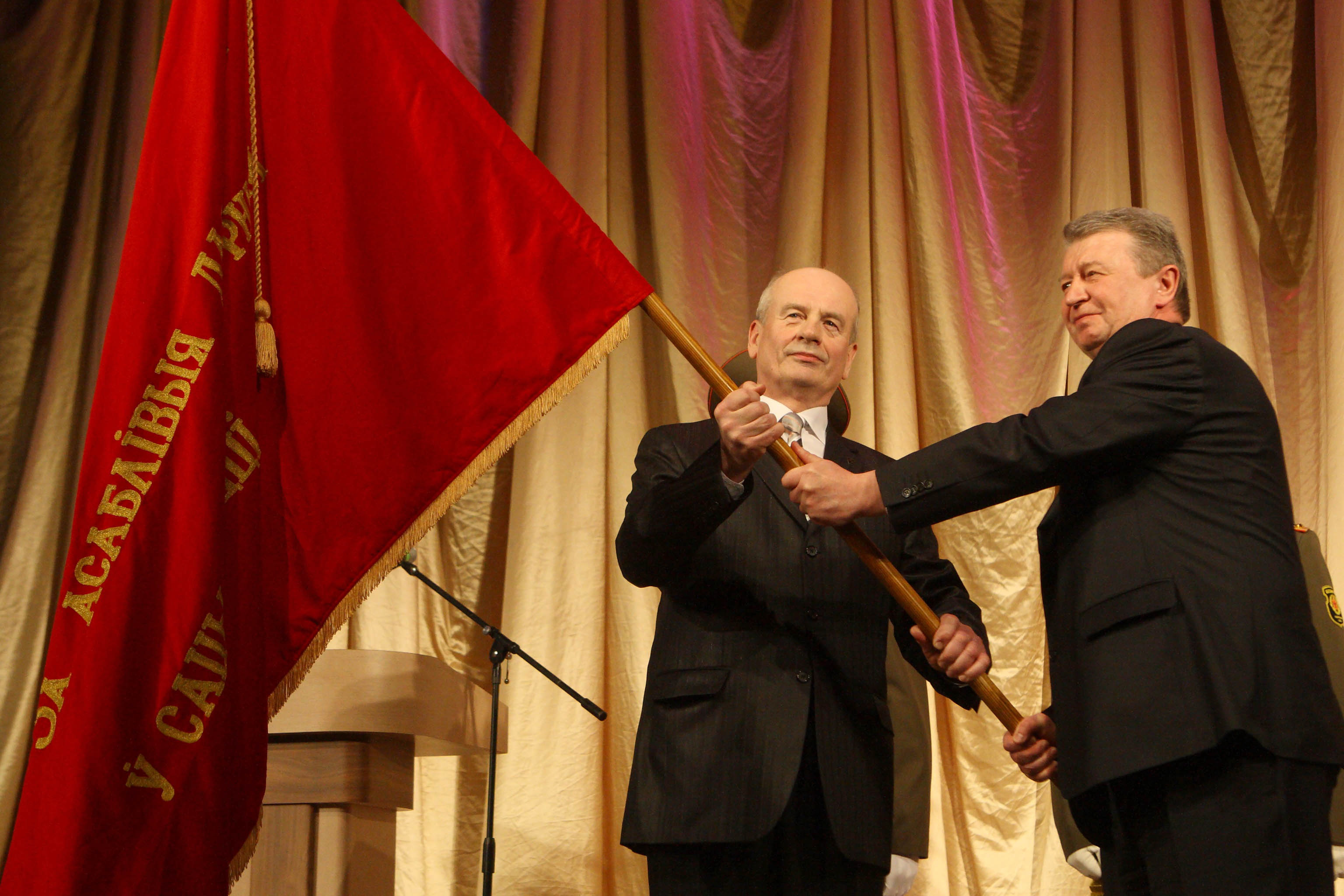

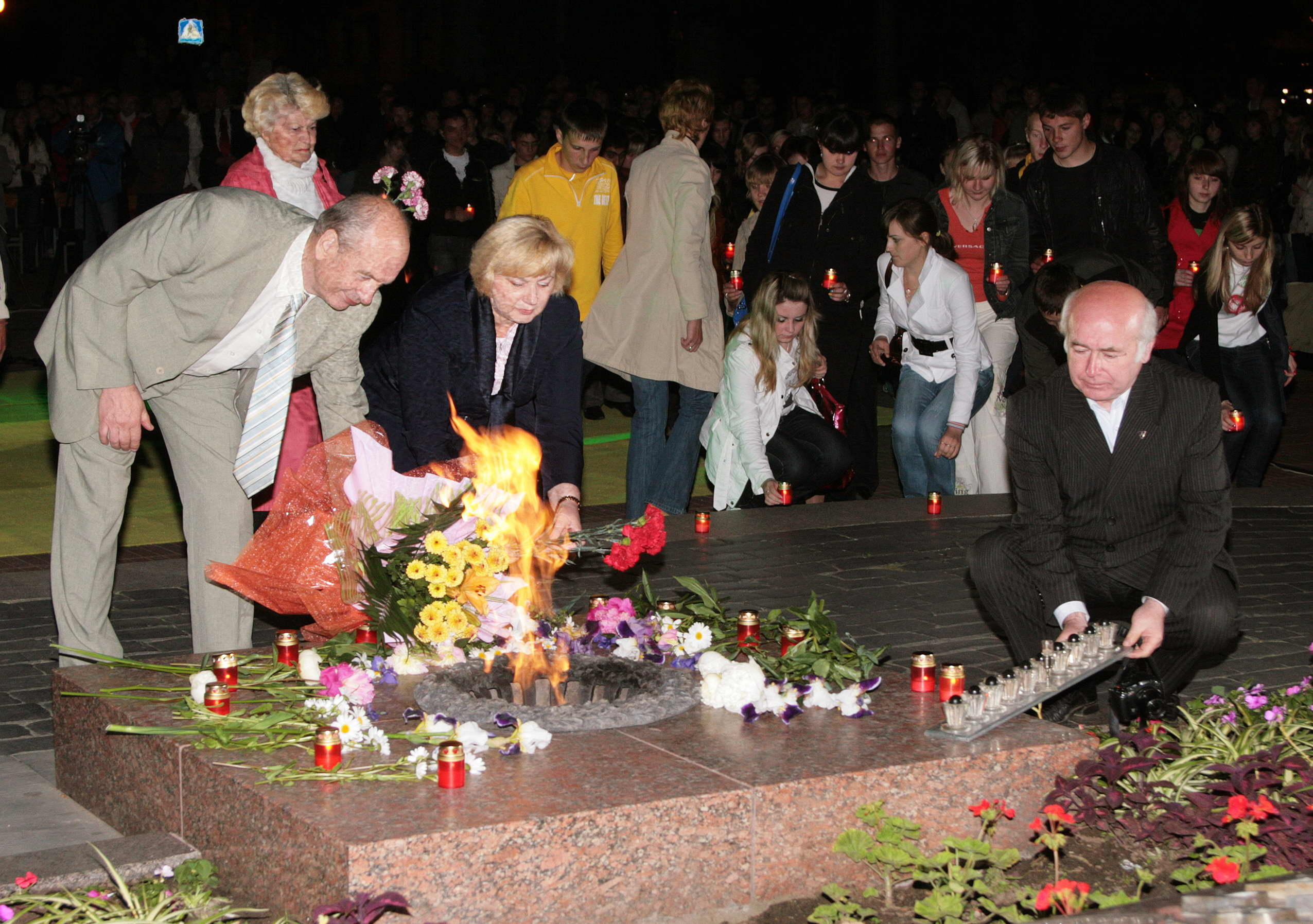

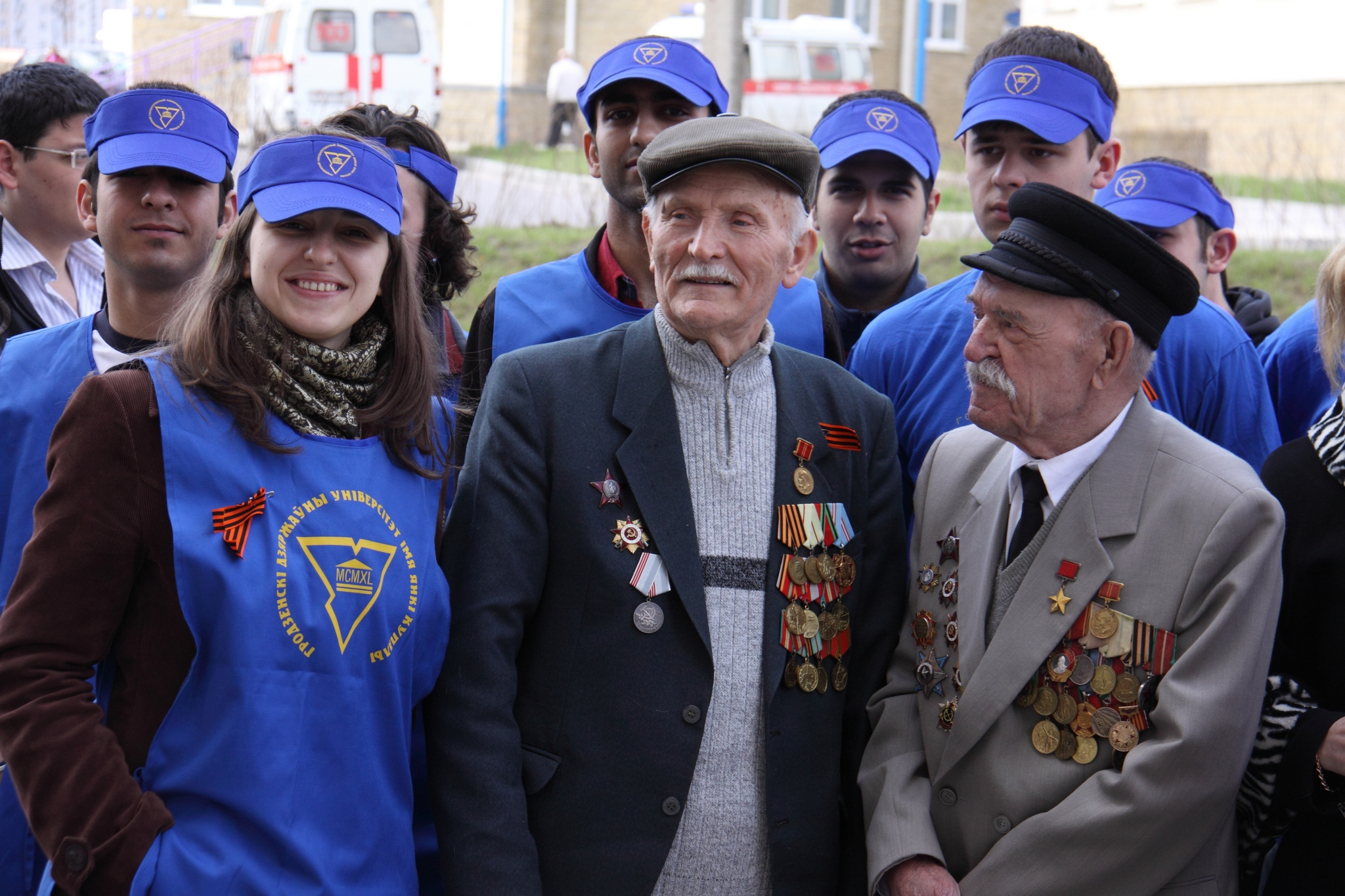

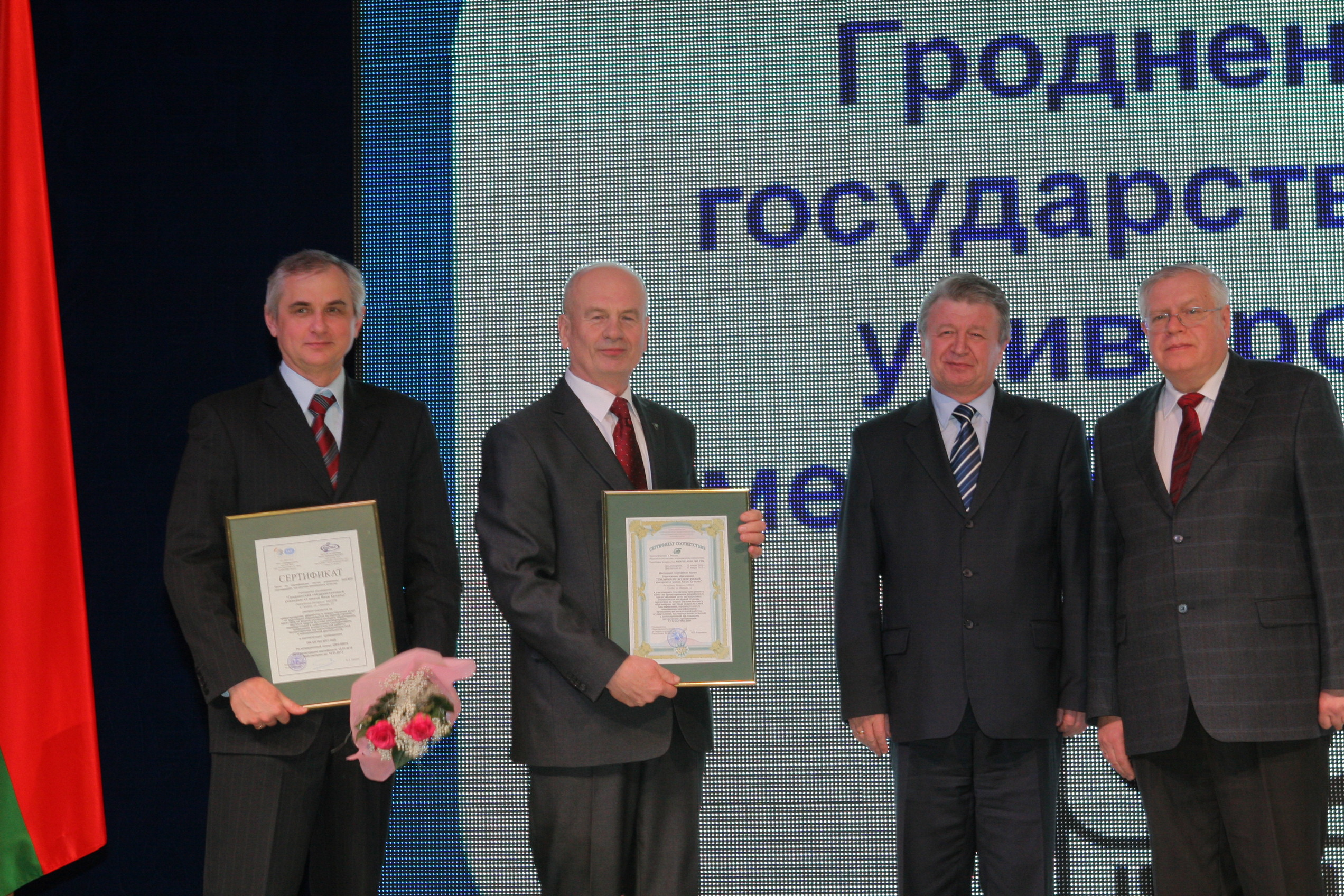

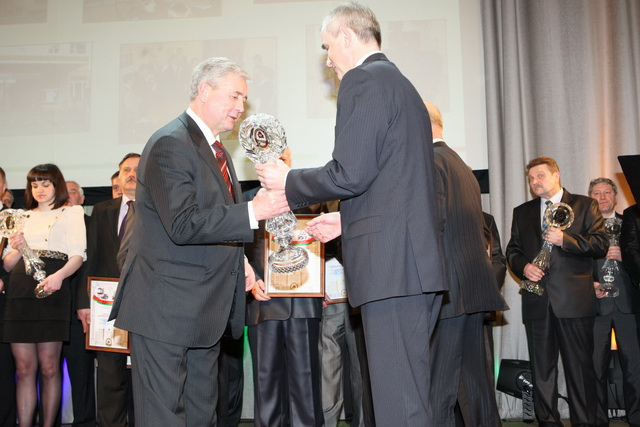
