= Alyaksandr Kazulin =

Belarusian university official, opposition politician, and activist

- Аляксандр Казулін; Александр Козулин
- Born: 25 November 1955 (age 70); Minsk, Byelorussian SSR, Soviet Union
- Citizenship: Belarus

Alyaksandr Kazulin (Belarusian: Аляксандр Уладзіслававіч Казулін, Russian: Александр Владиславович Козулин, born 25 November 1955) is a Belarusian politician who was the former leader of the Belarusian Social Democratic Party and one of the candidates who ran for the office of President of Belarus on 19 March 2006. He was a rector of the Belarusian State University (BSU) from 1996 to 2003 and a government minister serving under Belarus President Lukashenko but later fell out of favor. He holds a PhD in mathematics and pedagogy.

== Biography ==
Kazulin was born on 25 November 1955 in Minsk. In 1972, he graduated from school No. 87 and entered the evening department of the Mathematics Department of Belarusian State University. During this period he worked part-time as a lab technician in physics class at school. Served in the Baltic Navy in the Marines from 1974 to 1976. After the army, he worked in the forging shop at the Minsk Tractor Plant. In 1976 he continued his studies at the Faculty of Mechanics and Mathematics of Belarusian State University, he graduated with honours in 1983.

From 1983 to 1986 he was a postgraduate student in the Department of Differential Equations. After defending his thesis in 1986 (scientific supervisor Prof. M. A. Lukashevich), Kazulin started working as a senior teacher.

From 1988 to 1996, he worked in the Ministry of Education of the Republic of Belarus, reaching the position of Deputy Minister of Education and Science of the Republic of Belarus. He made a significant contribution to the reform of the state education system. He is one of the authors of the 'Act on Education of the Republic of Belarus' and the 'Concept of Education and Upbringing of the Republic of Belarus'. In 1995, he defended his doctoral thesis on new educational technologies at the Moscow State Pedagogical University.

On 8 August 1996, he was appointed Rector of the Belarusian State University.

== Political activity ==
In December 2005, Kazulin registered his candidacy for the 2006 presidential election. His election campaign was the most censored of all candidates, and Lukashenko marked Kazulin as his main personal enemy.

Several weeks before the 2006 presidential election, on 2 March 2006, Kazulin was beaten and detained by police after attempting to enter the All Belarusian People's Assembly. Witnesses testified that police fired into the air to stop a car carrying journalists and members of Kazulin's election team. Kazulin was charged with disorderly conduct and released after being held in custody for eight hours.

During the events following the 19 March 2006 presidential election, on 25 March, Kazulin was present in a confrontation between demonstrators and police. Reportedly he walked to the commanding officer with flowers in his hand, and police knocked him off his feet, beat him up, and then detained him. In a post-election interview Kazulin said, "We're not afraid of tanks and violence; we're afraid of prisons and having no freedom. We're tired of living in a spiritual prison."

On 13 July 2006, Kazulin was sentenced to jail for five and a half years at a court in Minsk. He was convicted for his role in the March protests with the official charge being of hooliganism and incitement to mass disorder during the events of 25 March. Amnesty International recognized him as a prisoner of conscience.

On 26 February 2008, he was allowed to attend his wife's funeral, after threatening to go on hunger strike and with significant pressure from EU and US officials onto Belarusian government.

On March 7, 2008, the US announced sanctions against all state enterprises of the petrochemical complex of Belarus. As David Kramer openly stated, the reason was "the unwillingness of the Belarusian government to release Alexander Kozulin". On 16 August 2008, Kazulin was released from prison.

Since 2008, Kazulin has refused any offers to return to politics.

Academic offices
Preceded by Fiodar Kapucki	Rector of the Belarusian State University; 1996–2003	Succeeded by Vasil Stražaŭ
