= Ivan Chigrinov =

Belarusian writer

Ivan Čyhrynaŭ (Belarusian: Іван Чыгрынаў) (1934–5 January 1996) was a Belarusian writer. He was a writer for the magazine, "Połymia".

He graduated from the philology department of Belarusian State University in 1957, and began publishing works in 1961. He wrote short story collections such as The Birds Fly to Freedom (1965), The Happiest Man (1967), and A Man Went to War (1973), mainly around the hardships and heroism of regular people during World War II. His novels The Quail’s Cry (1972) and Blood Acquittal (1977) also deal with war themes, set during the German-Soviet War of 1941–45. He is a recipient of the State Prize of the Byelorussian SSR, awarded in 1974.
