= Yury Ambrazevich =

Belarusian politician and diplomat

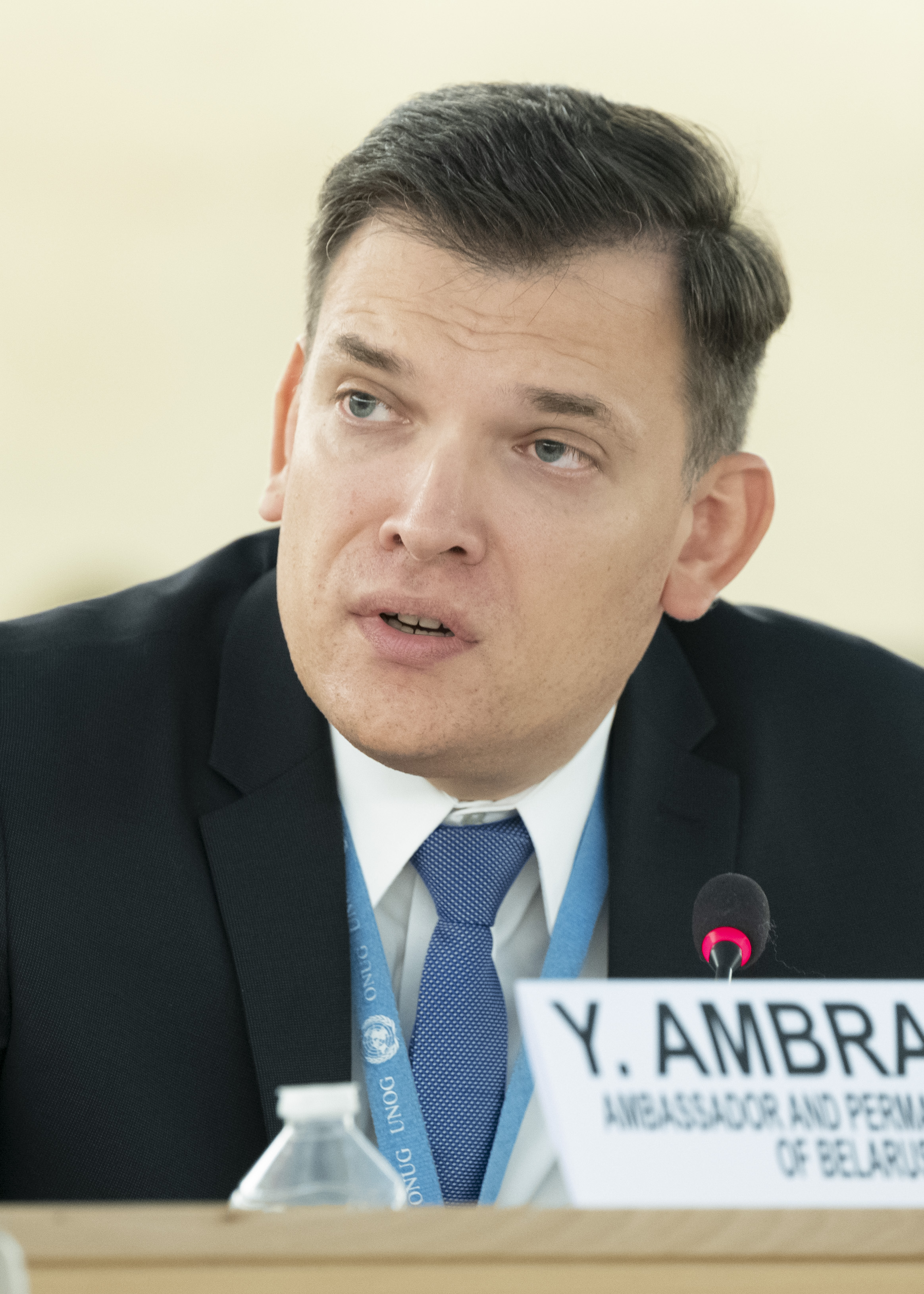

Yury Ambrazevich (born 1975) is a Belarusian diplomat serving as deputy minister of foreign affairs. He holds the title of Envoy Extraordinary and Plenipotentiary of the Second class of Belarus and is currently the Belarusian ambassador to the Holy See.

== Education and career ==
Ambrazevich was born in Minsk and attended Belarusian State University. Upon graduation in 1997, he joined the Ministry of Foreign Affairs as an Attache of the Division of International Legal Issues of Multilateral Cooperation and served in various positions in the Legal Department of the Ministry of Foreign Affairs. From 2000 to 2004, he served concurrently as First Secretary of the Embassy of Belarus in the Kingdom of Belgium and European Communities. He rose through the ranks to become Minister Counsellor, embassy of the Republic of Belarus in the Kingdom of Belgium from 2007 to 2012. In 2015, he became Permanent Representative of Belarus to the United Nations Office and other International Organizations in Geneva (Swiss Confederation) and served until March 2022 when he became deputy minister of foreign affairs. In 2025, Ambrazevich was appointed ambassador to the Holy See.
