= Barys Tasman =

Belarusian journalist (1954–2022)

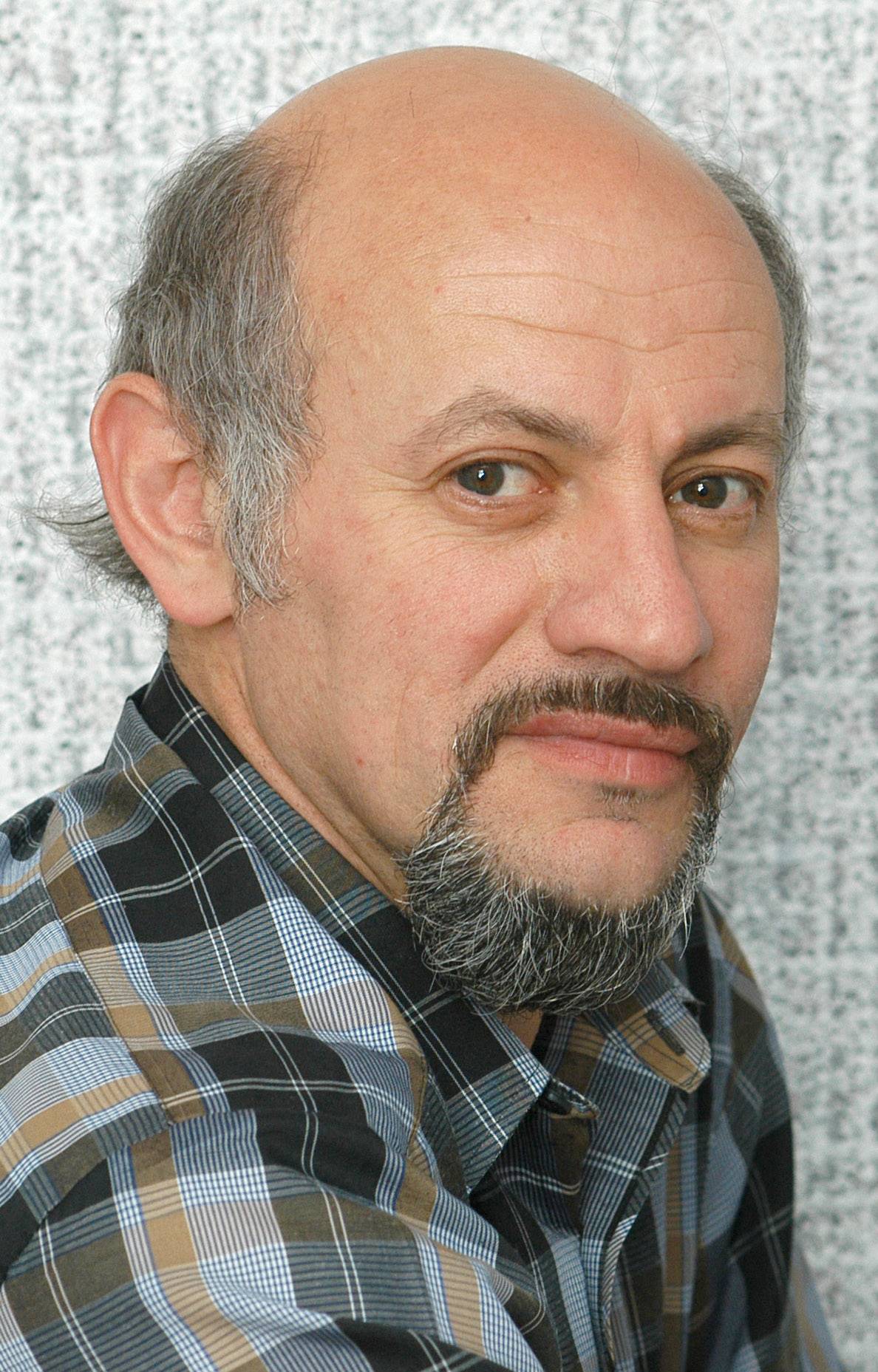
- Barys Tasman in 2004
- Born: Boris Rafailovich Tasman; 13 November 1954; Minsk, BSSR
- Died: 25 June 2022 (aged 67); Minsk, Belarus
- Occupation: Journalist

Barys Tasman (Belarusian: Барыс Тасман) (13 November 1954 – 25 June 2022), was a Belarusian journalist, sports reporter and sports analyst.

Tasman was born in a Jewish family in Minsk. He graduated from the Belarusian State University with a major in geography in 1980. He worked as a loader, worker at a road equipment plant, and assistant at a geodetic laboratory. From 1981 to 1994, he pursued a career as a geography teacher in several Minsk secondary schools. Tasman organized the first Belarusian school-based Museum of astronautics (1987–1994) at the Minsk school № 46.

Since childhood, he was interested in sports and "dreamed of sports journalism," but he entered into the profession only after the collapse of the Soviet Union at the age of 40.

Over 20 years (1994–1997 and 2002–2020), he worked as a reporter, observer, and editor of the first Belarusian independent sports newspaper, Pressball, covering football, athletics, tennis, wrestling, boxing, fencing, chess, and other Olympic sports.

Tasman was also a sports editor at the then-most popular Belarusian independent daily newspapers Svaboda (1997–1998), Belorusskaya Delovaya Gazeta (1999-2002), and Belorusskaya Gazeta (2002).

Barys Tasman was called "one of the most authoritative sports experts" in Belarus, and "a legend of Belarusian sports journalism". He was also known for his "encyclopedic knowledge in the field of sports history and statistics", and his sports analytics "became a phenomenon in Belarusian journalism".

In different years, he authored numerous publications about the history of the Olympic Games and world sports and interviewed famous Belarusian and Soviet athletes, coaches, and sports officials of different decades, creating the history of Belarusian sports. In addition, he regularly produced analyses and journalistic investigations denouncing the corruption of state-run sports bodies.

Tasman covered the World and European championships in athletics in Gothenburg (1995), Paris (1997), Budapest (1998), and Moscow (2013) on the ground. He also served as a press attaché of the Belarusian Athletics Federation in 2005-2006.

He predicted the future success of Belarusian sports stars Max Mirnyi and Vladimir Voltchkov, the primary sensation of the 2004 Summer Olympics Yulia Nestsiarenka, and others.

Barys Tasman was known for his consistent criticism of the policies of the authoritarian leader of Belarus, Alexander Lukashenko. In 1997, he was among over 100 prominent Belarusian opposition politicians, human rights activists, cultural figures, and journalists who signed Charter 97, a declaration calling for democracy in Belarus. While working in Belorusskaya Delovaya Gazeta, he wrote opinion columns on socio-political topics criticizing the policies of the Belarusian authorities. He also wrote his 'political' column on the website of the first Belarusian independent news agency BelaPAN.

For 10 years (2009–2018), Tasman authored the sports chapter for the Belarusian Yearbook, an annual publication "analyzing key developments of the state and society in Belarus."
