= Andrei Korol =

Belarusian academic and politician (born 1972)

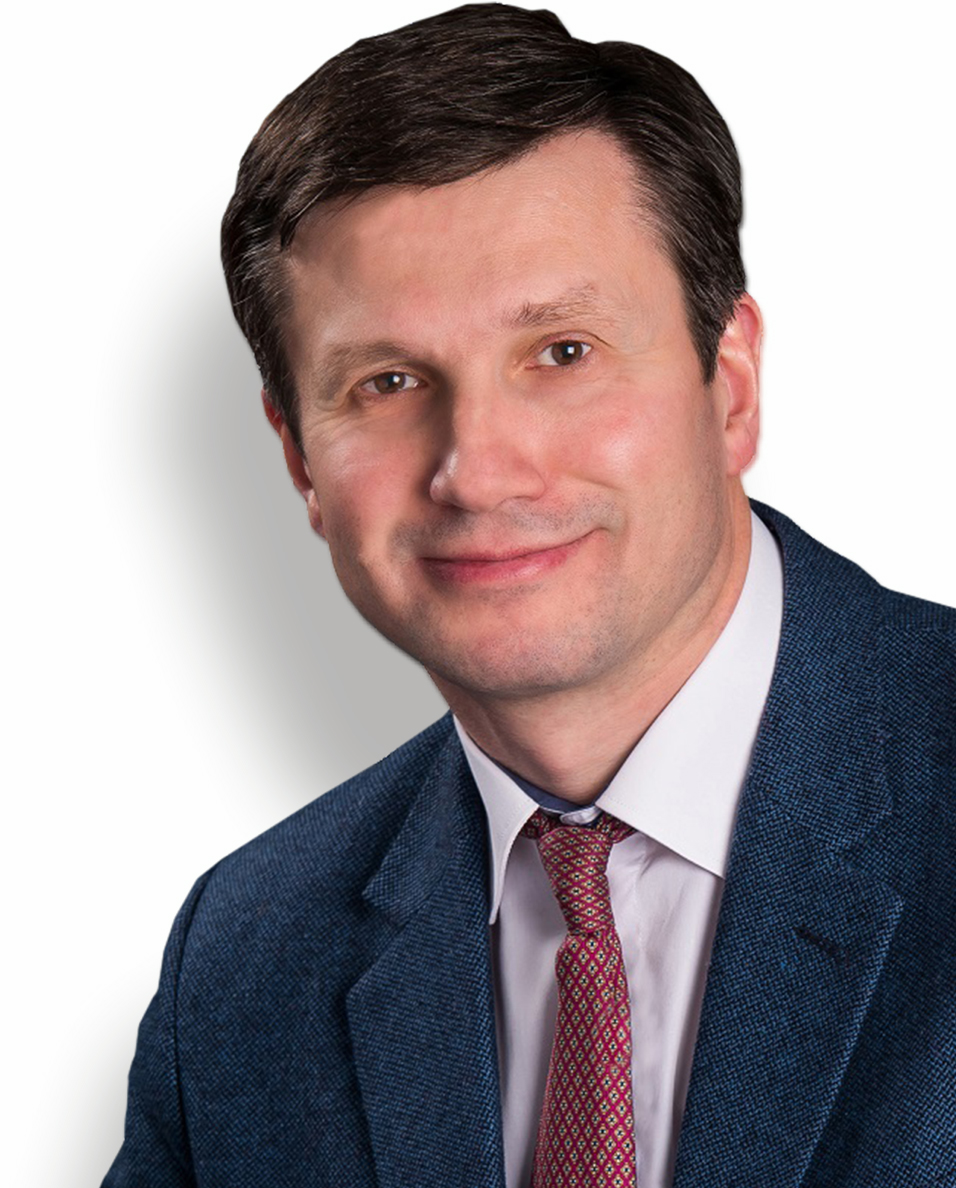
- Korol in 2022

Rector of the Belarusian State University
- Incumbent
- Assumed office 28 September 2017
- President: Alexander Lukashenko
- Preceded by: Sergei Ablameiko

Personal details
- Born: 30 October 1972 (age 53)

Andrei Dmitrievich Korol (Russian: Андрей Дмитриевич Король; born 30 October 1972) is a Belarusian academic and politician serving as rector of the Belarusian State University since 2017. He has been a member of the Minsk City Council of Deputies since 2024. From 2013 to 2017, he served as rector of the Yanka Kupala State University of Grodno.
