= Radishchev Art Museum =

Art museum in Saratov, Russia

Coordinates: 51°31′55.9″N 46°02′06.9″E

Radishchev Art Museum Саратовский художественный музей имени А. Н. Радищева
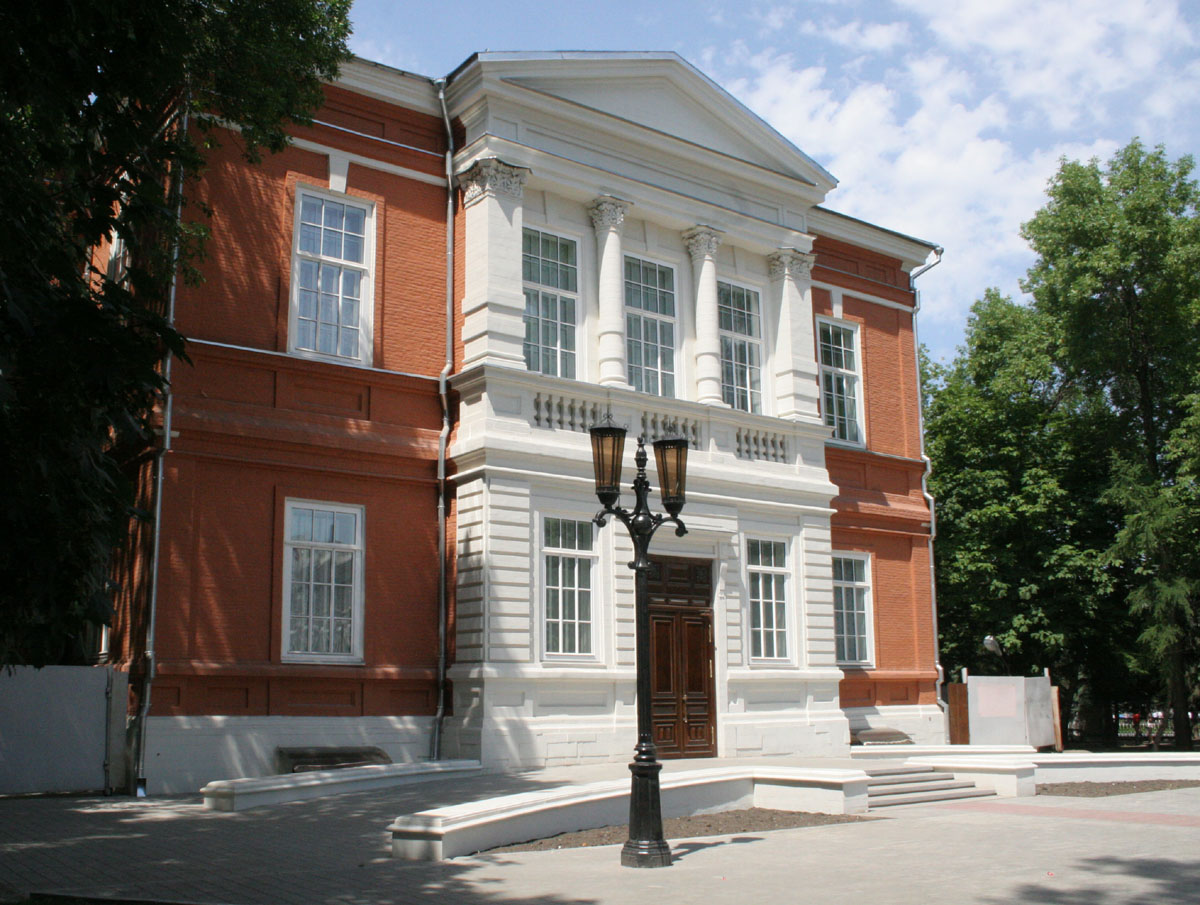
- Radishchev Art Museum summer view
- Established: 1885
- Location: Russia, Saratov, Radishcheva, 39
- Website: radmuseumart.ru

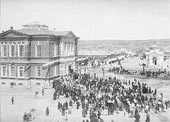
Opening of Radischev Museum in Saratov

The Radishchev Art Museum in Saratov opened to the public on June 29, 1885. It is supposed to have been Russia's first major public art museum outside Moscow or St. Petersburg. It was founded by Alexey Bogolyubov and named after his grandfather, the 18th-century revolutionary writer Alexander Radishchev. The naming was a direct challenge to the authorities: Bogolyubov had to endure a legal battle to get permission. It was the first art museum in Russia open to everybody. It was opened to the general public seven years earlier than the Tretyakov Gallery in Moscow and fifteen years earlier than the Russian Museum in Saint Petersburg.

It includes work by Camille Corot, Auguste Rodin, Ivan Kramskoy, Vasily Polenov, Ilya Repin, Ivan Shishkin, Fyodor Vasilyev, Aleksandra Ekster, Pavel Kuznetsov, Aristarkh Lentulov, Robert Falk, Pyotr Konchalovsky, Martiros Saryan, Fyodor Rokotov and others. Early donors included Pavel Tretyakov and Pauline Viardot.

During the Great Patriotic War, future Director of the Belarusian National Art Museum, Alena Aladava, worked there.
