= Slavamir Adamovich =

Belarusian poet, publicist, and translator of Norwegian literature

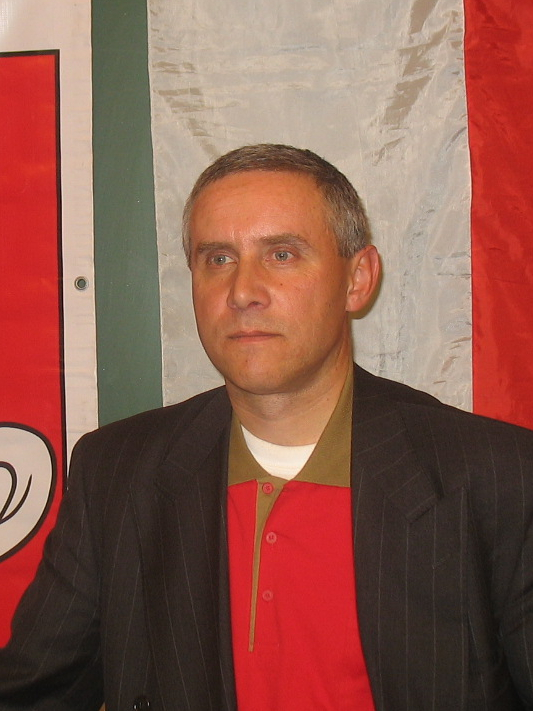
- Born: March 8, 1962 (age 64); Unezhma, Onezhsky District
- Education: Belarusian State University
- Known for: poetry
- Notable work: Kalvaryjskiya klony (1990); Plavilshchiki rasy (1999); Rym (2011)

Slavamir Henrykhovich Adamovich (Belarusian: Славамір Генрыхавіч Адамовіч, Russian: Славомир Генрихович Адамович; born 8 March 1962 in Unezhma) is a Belarusian poet, publicist, and translator of Norwegian literature. In the 1990s, he was known as a far-right, nationalist political activist. In 1996, he was arrested, partly due to the writing of his poem Ubiej prezidenta (Kill the President). He is noted for being the first writer in the history of independent Belarus to be sentenced for his literary work.

== Biography ==
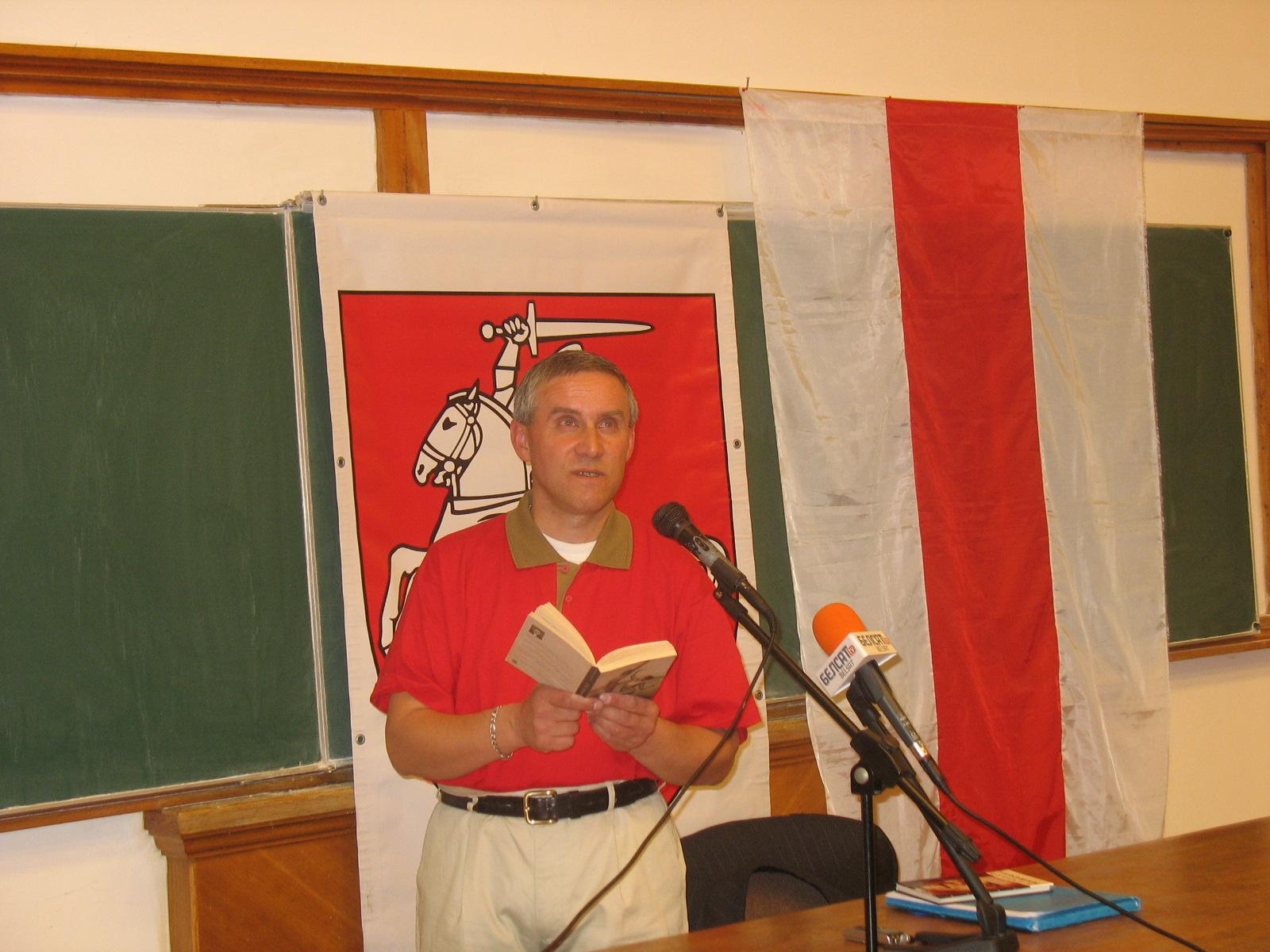
Slavamir Adamovich at a meeting at Collegium Civitas university, Warsaw, 17 October 2008

Slavamir Adamovich was born on 8 March 1962 in Unezhma in the Onezhsky District of Arkhangelsk Oblast, Russian SFSR. He is of Belarusian descent, the son of Józefa Czantaryckaya and Hienrykh Adamovich. His parents moved to this region of the Soviet Union for work. (Note: In the book Beyond the Horizon of Europe. An Anthology of New Belarusian Poetry 1987–1997, there is information contradicting Adamovich's own statements, suggesting that his parents were exiles.) His maternal grandparents were Tereza Czantaryckaya and Pavel Czantaryckaya. His paternal grandparents were Hryzielda Adamovich and Stanislav Adamovich.

In 1977, Adamovich completed the 8th grade at a school in Budslaw. He graduated from Svir Special Vocational-Technical School No. 17 in 1979. He worked in the Kazakh SSR and then, from 1979 to 1980, as a locksmith at the Budslaw sovkhoz in the Myadzyel District of the Belarusian SSR. From 1980 to 1982, he served in the Soviet Army. In 1983, he was a track installer for the Maladzyechna road section of the Belarusian Railway. From 1983 to 1986, he worked as a driller at the Kirov Machine-Building Plant in Minsk. He studied at the Belarusian State University's Faculty of Philology from 1986, graduating in 1992. From 1991 to 1995, he was a correspondent and department head for Nastaunickaya Gazeta (Teacher's Newspaper). In the mid-1990s, he was unemployed. He worked as a correspondent for the newspaper Nasha Niva in the late 1990s.

In 1993, Adamovich joined the BPF Party. In 1994, he founded the far-right nationalist Belarusian group Pravy Rewanż (Right-Wing Revenge). In April 1996, he was arrested in connection with a criminal case No. 182. The official reason for his arrest was a poem he wrote in November 1995 in Russian, titled Ubiej priezidienta (Kill the President), published in the Vitebsk newspaper Vybor (Choice). He conducted a hunger strike for eight days in detention. He was convicted of inciting illegal change of power, illegally crossing the state border, and illegally carrying a melee weapon. This made him the first writer in independent Belarus to be convicted for his work. He spent 10 months in prison. Due to public support and intervention from a group of Russian writers (including Dmitry Likhachev, Andrei Voznesensky, Bella Akhmadulina, Andrei Bitov, Bulat Okudzhava, Fazil Iskander, Anatoly Pristavkin, and others), he was released on 7 February 1997 under the condition that he could not leave the country. After his release, during a protest in August 1997, he demonstrated his opposition to the Belarusian authorities by publicly sewing his lips shut. He has been a member of the Belarusian Writers' Union since 1999.

In 2000, Adamovich worked on construction sites in New York. He returned to Belarus and bought a one-room apartment in Minsk in 2001. He claimed to have made efforts to unite Belarusian organizations he described as patriotic: Pravy Rewanż, White Legion, Kraj, and Zubr, but these efforts were unsuccessful. In September 2002 (or according to another source, in 2003), he left Belarus for Norway, where he received residency and a work permit (according to another source, he received "humanitarian asylum"). He settled in the city of Bodø. He translated letters from Norwegian writer Knut Hamsun to his wife into Belarusian, becoming one of the first Belarusian translators of this writer. In February 2005, Adamovich was assaulted and beaten in his own apartment. The police could not identify the attackers, but according to Norwegian law, he received compensation from the state. While living in Norway, he visited Belarus multiple times, including in 2010.

In early 2014, Adamovich established a private art gallery called U Slavamira in Maryina Horka, which is intended to be part of his "Belarusian House" – a meeting place for Belarusian creators. In the same year, he was twice detained by police in Minsk. He believes the reason was the blue-yellow and white-red-white ribbons he wore as a sign of solidarity with the democratic forces in Belarus and Ukraine's struggle against Russian aggression.

== Works ==
Slavamir Adamovich's first two poetry books were Kalvaryjskiya klony, published in the early 1990s as part of the series Library of the 'Maladosc' Magazine, and Plavilshchiki rasy, published in the late 1990s in the Library of the 'Nasha Niva' Magazine series. These collections explored themes of love, war, and homeland, written in a realist style with a lively, expressive, and vivid character. His third collection, Rym, published in 2011, is noted for its original style with philosophical references.

=== List of works ===
- Kalvaryjskiya klony. Minsk: 1990. (Belarusian)
- Ziamla Chanaan. Polotsk: 1993. (Belarusian)
- Zvarotnyya pravakacyi. Polotsk: 1994. (Belarusian)
- Kakhannie pad akupatsiyaj. Minsk: 1996. (Belarusian). A collection of poems published by Adamovich's friends while he was in prison.
- Spiral Bruna. Minsk: 1997 or 1998. (Belarusian)
- Plavilshchiki rasy. Vilnius: 1999. (Belarusian)
- Turemny dzionnik. Minsk: 2001. (Belarusian)
- Tsana Europy, albo Historyi Wilmana. 2011. (Belarusian). Published in the magazine Dziejaslou.
- Rym. Wybranyja viershy 2002–2010. Minsk: 2011. (Belarusian)

Selected works of Slavamir Adamovich have been translated into Polish by Jan Maksymiuk and published in Poland in 1998 in the collection titled Za niebokresem Europy. Antologia nowej poezji białoruskiej 1987–1997 (Beyond the Horizon of Europe. Anthology of New Belarusian Poetry 1987–1997).

== Views ==
Slavamir Adamovich holds far-right, nationalist, and oppositional views against the government of Alexander Lukashenko. He describes Lukashenko's regime as an anti-Belarusian regime and a mere criminal gang. Among opposition politicians, he particularly respects Uladzimir Nyaklyayew, also a poet. Adamovich perceives Russia as a serious threat to Belarus and a potential aggressor. He believes that the Belarusian society should form and train voluntary paramilitary units to defend the country against a possible Russian invasion. He unequivocally supports Ukraine in the Ukrainian-Russian conflict, asserting that the outcome will also determine Belarus' future. Adamovich advocates for establishing a physical border between Belarus and Russia in the form of a strip of plowed land.

He considers himself one of the most prominent Belarusian writers of his generation, placing himself on par only with Uladzimir Nyaklyayew and Leanid Dranko-Maysiuk. Adamovich emphasizes that he does not maintain contacts with his literary peers due to his unique independence and infrequent stays in the country. He believes that even friendly relations with other writers could hinder his creative process and ideological stance. Adamovich advocates separating politics and art and being proud of non-Belarusian works in the artistic realm. He notes that both he and Uladzimir Nyaklyayew became widely known more for their political activities than their artistic contributions, which he considers a natural phenomenon, asserting that talent always finds something to oppose and fight against.

Commenting on the terrorist attacks in Norway by Anders Breivik, Adamovich stated that they were a natural consequence of the country's internal problems, such as the large influx of immigrants, integration issues, and the native Norwegians' pursuit of a high standard of living, leading to low birth rates. Although he condemned the attacks, Adamovich expressed the belief that Breivik was not insane but a rational person who used the act to spread his ideas and make the Norwegian society aware of these issues. He stressed that while he shares similar views to Breivik, he chooses to fight with words.

== Reception ==
Vasili Yakovenko describes Slavamir Adamovich as a talented and educated individual with his flaws and weaknesses. Yakovenko believes that Adamovich has entered the consciousness of Belarusians as a reckless desperado, even a weirdo, whom people have unfortunately become unaccustomed to and regard as 'abnormal', although they should be proud of such individuals. Yakovenko portrays Adamovich as a sensitive, lyrical person, doomed to dramatic fatalism, simple, sincere, and trusting, yet capable of explosiveness in critical moments. This gives rise to his militancy, courage, dignity, and adherence to principles. Yakovenko believes that Adamovich, more than others, can see what threatens society and, in trying to protect it, throws himself into the flames. His uncompromising patriotism led him into conflict with the authorities, resulting in repression and the fate of an outcast. Yakovenko sees a similarity between Adamovich's fate and that of artist Ales Pushkin and former scholar Mikalai Prashkovich. Critic Leanid Halubovich believes that Adamovich's work is significantly influenced by his lack of contact with his literary peers.

== Awards and recognitions ==
In 1996, Slavamir Adamovich received the Hliniany Viales award for his collection of poems Kakhannie pad akupatsiyaj (Love Under Occupation). The award ceremony took place at the headquarters of the BPF Party in Minsk.

== Personal life ==
Slavamir Adamovich is a Catholic. Around 1999, his illegitimate daughter was born in Belarus, a fact he learned about 11 years later. Adamovich's mother lives in the village of Olchówka in Belarus. In 2014, she also published her own collection of poems.
