= Alena Aladava =

Belarusian art historian and curator

- Алена Аладава
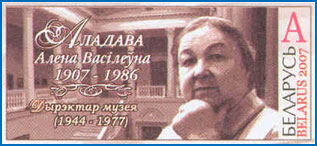
- Aladava on a 2007 stamp of Belarus
- Born: Алена Васілеўна Пук; 22 May 1907
- Died: 29 May 1986 (aged 79)
- Education: Belarus State University
- Occupation: Museum director
- Employer: Belarusian National Art Museum
- Predecessor: Nikolay Mikholap
- Successor: Yury Karachun

Alena Vasileŭna Aładava (née Puk; Belarusian: Але́на Васі́леўна Ала́дава; Russian: Еле́на Васи́льевна Ала́дова; 22 May 1907 – 29 May 1986) was a Soviet art historian and curator, who was Director of the Belarusian National Arts Museum from 1944 to 1977. Aladava was responsible for the reconstruction of the museum's collection in the post-war period in Belarus, tracking down lost collections, acquiring new pieces and undertaking expeditions to the country's regions in search of existing works.

== Biography ==
Alena Puk was born in 1907 in Pruzhany, in the Grodno Governorate of the Russian Empire. She studied at the Belarusian State University. In 1928 Aladava married Mikalai Aladov (be), who was a composer and Director of the Belarusian Conservatoire. They had three children, the musicologist Radaslava Aladava (be), the architect Valmen Aladov, and Gemir.

Prior to the Nazi invasion of Belarus in 1941, Aladava was working for the Belarusian National Arts Museum in Minsk, as Head of the Department of Russian and Belarusian Art. During the invasion of 1941, all 2771 works from the collection were stolen; some were deliberately selected by Hans Posse and Cajetan Müllmann, for German collections.

From Minsk Aladava was evacuated to Saratov, where she worked for the Radishchev Museum. In January 1944 she moved to Moscow where she curated an exhibition of Belarusian art entitled "Belarus lives! Belarus struggles!" As a result of this several rooms in the Minsk Trade Union Building were allocated for Aladava to run a national gallery from, which eventually opened in 1947.

After the end of the Second World War, Aladava led the reconstruction of the national art collection. She had been appointed Director in 1944 and one of her first tasks had been to organise the gallery's first inventory of works, which was based entirely on the memories of members of staff, since no previous list had been made. The inventory enabled Aladava to track artworks that had been looted from the Belarusian collection, some of which by then were then in private Russian collections, and to organise their reacquisition. Her work also involved purchasing art from artists such as Boris Kustodiev, Vasily Polenov, Karl Briullov and Isaak Levitan.

In 1957, due to Aladava's efforts a new building for the art museum, designed by Mikhail Baklanov, was unveiled. She led a number of research expeditions during her time as Director, notably discovering the icon of the Virgin Hodegetria of Smolensk from Dubyanets in 1958. On one occasion, whilst director of the museum, Aladava complained to the visiting artist Nadia Léger about a lack of funding. Léger removed a gold brooch from her coat and offered it to Aladava for the museum. Aladava did not accept it.

Aladava retired in 1977. She was succeeded by Yury Karachun, who had been Chairman of the Belarusian Division of the International Council of Museums (ICOM). She died in 1986.

== Legacy ==
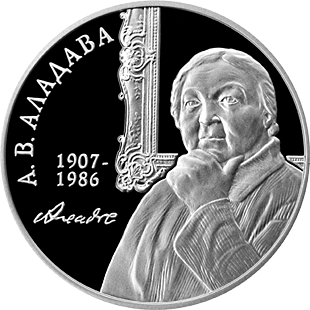
Aladava on the reverse of a commemorative Belarusian rubel coin

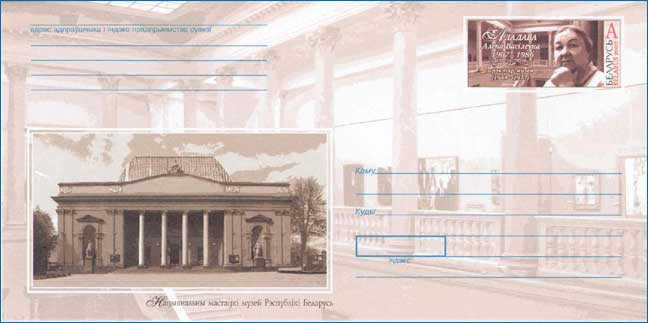
Aladava on a 2007 Belarusian postcard

To commemorate the centenary of her birth, Aladava was featured on the 1 and 10 rubel coins. She was also featured on a commemorative stamp.

== Awards ==
- Honoured Art Worker of the BSSR.
