= Boris Mordukhovich =

American mathematician

Boris Mordukhovich (Russian: Борис Шолимович Мордухович) is an American mathematician recognized for his research in the areas of nonlinear analysis, optimization, and control theory. Mordukhovich is one of the founders of modern variational analysis and generalized differentiation. Currently he is Distinguished University Professor and Lifetime Scholar of the Academy of Scholars at Wayne State University (Vice President, 2009–2010 and President, 2010–2011).

== Life and works ==
Mordukhovich was born and educated in the Soviet Union; he emigrated to the United States with his family in December 1988. He developed constructions of generalized differentiation (bearing now his name), and their development and applications to classes of problems in variational analysis, optimization, equilibrium, control, economics, engineering, and other fields. His theory and various applications have been summarized in the 2-volume monograph, and in his more recent books, and. Mordukhovich has published more than 550 journal papers.

Mordukhovich is an AMS Fellow of the Inaugural Class, a SIAM Fellow, and a recipient of many international awards and honors, including 2025 INFORMS Frederick W. Lanchester Prize, Dr. Honoris Causa from the National Sun Yat-sen University in Taiwan, University of Messina, University of Alicante in Spain, Babeș-Bolyai University, Romania and from Vietnam Academy of Science and Technology. He is the Founding Editor (2008) and was a co-Editor-in-Chief (2009–2014) of Set-Valued and Variational Analysis, an international journal. Since 2016, he is a co-Editor-in-Chief, Applied Analysis and Optimization, and since 2021 he is the area editor of Journal of Optimization Theory and Application. He was Chair (2012 - 2015) of the International Working Group on Generalized Convexity and Monotonicity. In 2016, he was elected to the Accademia Peloritana dei Pericolanti (Italy), and in 2021 he became a Foreign Member of the National Academy of Sciences of Ukraine. He is on the list of Highly Cited Researchers in Mathematics and Inaugural ScholarGPS Highly Ranked Scholar in Mathematical Optimization, 2024.
