= Dzianis Liseichykau =

Belarusian historian and archivist

Dzianis Liseichykau (Дзяніс ЛІСЕЙЧЫКАЎ) (born 4 September 1979) is a Belarusian historian and archivist.

Liseichykau completed a degree in History at Belarusian State University in 2001. He received a Ph.D. in History from the Institute of History of the National Academy of Sciences of Belarus in 2009.

He has worked at the National Historical Archives of Belarus since 2002. In 2009 he became Head of the Department of Scientific Use of Documents and Information. In 2012 he accepted appointment as Deputy Director of NHAB.

His research interests are in the history of the Uniate Church (c. 1596-1839), the history of everyday life, genealogy and ecclesiastical archives.

== Links ==
- Personal page of Dzianis Liseichykau // on pawet.net
- Documents on the Jewish Genealogy in the collections of the National Historical Archives of Belarus
- Belarusians from abroad come home to share experiences
