= Gebr. Heinemann =

German company

Gebr. Heinemann SE & Co. KG
- Type: Kommanditgesellschaft
- Industry: Travel Retail
- Founded: 1879
- Headquarters: Hamburg, Germany
- Key people: Max Heinemann, Raoul Spanger, Kai Deneke, Inken Callsen, Florian Seidel (Executive Board); Claus Heinemann, Gunnar Heinemann (Supervisory Board)
- Revenue: EUR 4.3 billion (2024)
- Number of employees: 10,351 (2024)
- Website: www.gebr-heinemann.de

Gebr. Heinemann SE & Co. KG is a Hamburg-based distributor and retailer in the international travel market.

== History ==
Gebr. Heinemann was founded in Hamburg, Germany, on November 1, 1879, by Heinrich Christian Carl Heinemann and his brother Carl Friedrich Eduard Heinemann. The brothers began with duty- and tax-free wholesale trade in tobacco products and liquor. The focus was on supplying ship chandlers and shipping companies. The company was based in Hamburg's Speicherstadt warehouse district.

In 1903, Heinrich Heinemann's son Otto joined the company as a partner; Otto's brother Richard also joined the company in 1911. Due to the latter's untimely death, Otto Heinemann's son Helmut succeeded his as a partner in 1937.

In 1943, during World War II, the company experienced a major fire in which the warehouse at Sandtorkai was completely destroyed. From the 1950s, Gebr. Heinemann also supplied the new duty-free shops on ferries to Scandinavia with tobacco and confectionery products as well as liquor. In 1953 and 1954, the first airline customers followed (Icelandic Airlines and Deutsche Lufthansa).

The first duty-free shop was opened at Frankfurt Airport in 1958. This was operated by the state, supplied by Gebr. Heinemann. On February 16, 1962, large stocks in Hamburg became victims of the storm surge. In 1967, Horst Heinemann founded the subsidiary 'Tabak GmbH' for the tobacco product line.

The company received its first retail concession for duty-free at an airport in 1969 for Cologne/Bonn. Other shops soon followed. In 1978, the warehouse moved to Magdeburger Strasse (now Koreastrasse). In 1979, Gunnar and Claus Heinemann replaced their fathers and continued the family business in the fourth generation. Since 1986, the company headquarters have been located at Kaispeicher B in HafenCity.

When the European Union abolished duty- and tax-free purchasing for travel within the EU on July 1, 1999, the company expanded its market share in Europe, renaming its shops Travel Value. In 2003, a logistics center was built and put into operation in Hamburg-Allermöhe. The warehouse building in the Speicherstadt was converted into the company's headquarters.

Since 2008, Gebr. Heinemann has branded some of its self-operated shops under the name "Heinemann Duty Free & Travel Value". As part of this initiative, a new logo was introduced at locations including Frankfurt, starting in 2009. That same year, Gunnar and Claus Heinemann received the Hamburg Founder's Award for Lifetime Achievement, as well as founding their first Asia-based subsidiary Heinemann Asia Pacific with headquarters in Singapore. On January 1, 2012, the company changed its legal form from a KG to an SE & Co. KG. In 2013, Gebr. Heinemann founded the subsidiary Heinemann Americas, based in Miami.

In 2018, Max Heinemann became the company's fifth-generation CEO.

During the COVID-19 pandemic the company suffered the two worst years in its history. In 2020, it generated only 33% of the previous year's sales.

In March 2020, Gebr. Heinemann established a wholly owned subsidiary, Gharage, with the purpose of investing in start-ups within the travel and retail industries.

== Corporate structure ==
Since 2018, the company's managing director has been Max Heinemann. In 2022, he was joined by Raoul Spanger, who has been serving as a managing director since. Inken Callsen, Florian Seidel, and Kai Deneke serve as members of the executive board. Former managing directors Claus Heinemann and Gunnar Heinemann represent the owning family on the Supervisory Board.

Gebr. Heinemann operates as a distributor and retailer in over 100 countries. The company directly owns about 500 of its own shops as a retailer.

Gebr. Heinemann and its subsidiaries have shops in Europe, the Middle East, Asia (Heinemann Asia Pacifics), Africa and North America (Heinemann Americas). The company also operates its own logistics centers in the German cities Hamburg-Allermöhe and in Erlensee.

== Collusion lawsuit ==
Due to collusion with competitor James Richardson over the license to operate duty-free shops at Ben Gurion Airport in Tel Aviv, the Arbitration Commission of the International Chamber of Commerce ordered the company to pay damages on November 19, 2021.

A court in Tel Aviv confirmed the award in the summer of 2022.
