= Ksenia Syramalot =

Belarusian student activist (born 1999)

- Ксенія Сырамалот
- Born: December 19, 1999 (age 26)
- Education: State University of Belarus
- Occupations: Student leader Human rights activist
- Years active: 2020–present
- Employer: Belarusian Students' Association
- Criminal charges: Violating public order
- Criminal penalty: Two and a half years imprisonment
- Criminal status: Released

Ksenia Syramalot (Belarusian: Ксенія Сырамалот; born 19 December 1999) is a Belarusian human rights activist. While a student at the Belarusian State University, she served as the press secretary of the Belarusian Students' Association, as well as volunteering for the human rights organisation Viasna. Syramalot was arrested during the 2020–2021 Belarusian protests and was subsequently recognised as a political prisoner.

== Biography ==
Syramalot studied at the Lyceum of the Belarusian State University. She wrote various poems and short stories as a teenager that were published in the monthly cultural magazine Maladosts.

Syramalot went on to study philosophy and social sciences at the Belarusian State University, where she became involved with the Belarusian Students' Association and the human rights group Viasna. In 2020, she took part in public protests against the Belarusian government and the President of Belarus, Alexander Lukashenko, in the lead up to as well as during the 2020 presidential election. On 12 November 2020, Syramalot was arrested at her home, one of twelve academics arrested and charged under article 342 of the Belarusian criminal code, which criminalised the organisation of and participation in group actions that "grossly violate public order". Syramalot was placed in pre-trial detention at Amerikanka, a prison in Minsk run by the State Security Committee. On 23 November, she was transferred to Pishchalauski Castle.

On 18 November 2020, a joint statement issued by 15 Belarusian human rights organisations, including Viasna, the Belarusian Association of Journalists, the Belarusian Helsinki Committee and Belarusian PEN, recognising Syramalot as a political prisoner. On 20 January 2021, a joint statement by 14 Ukrainian human rights groups, including the Association of Ukrainian Monitors on Human Rights Conduct in Law Enforcement, the Ukrainian Helsinki Human Rights Union, the Kharkiv Human Rights Protection Group and Skhid SOS, described Syramalot's ongoing detention as illegal and an enforced disappearance. Thomas Waitz, a member of the European Parliament for Austria and President of the European Green Party symbolically adopted Syramalot, commending her and others for their "courage and bravery... [and] endurance and fortitude".

On 16 July 2021, the Savetski District Court in Minsk sentenced Syramalot to two and a half years in prison. Syramalot had pleaded not guilty. She served her sentence at women's penal colony no. 4 in Gomel alongside other student activists including Alana Gebremariam and Yana Arabeika. Syramalot was released from prison on 30 November 2022.

== Recognition ==
In November 2021, Syramalot received the Stories of Injustice Award from the Czech Republic, alongside Palina Sharenda-Panasiuk and Nikita Emelyanov.
