= Yana Arabeika =

Belarusian human rights activist (born 2001)

- Яна Іванаўна Арабейка
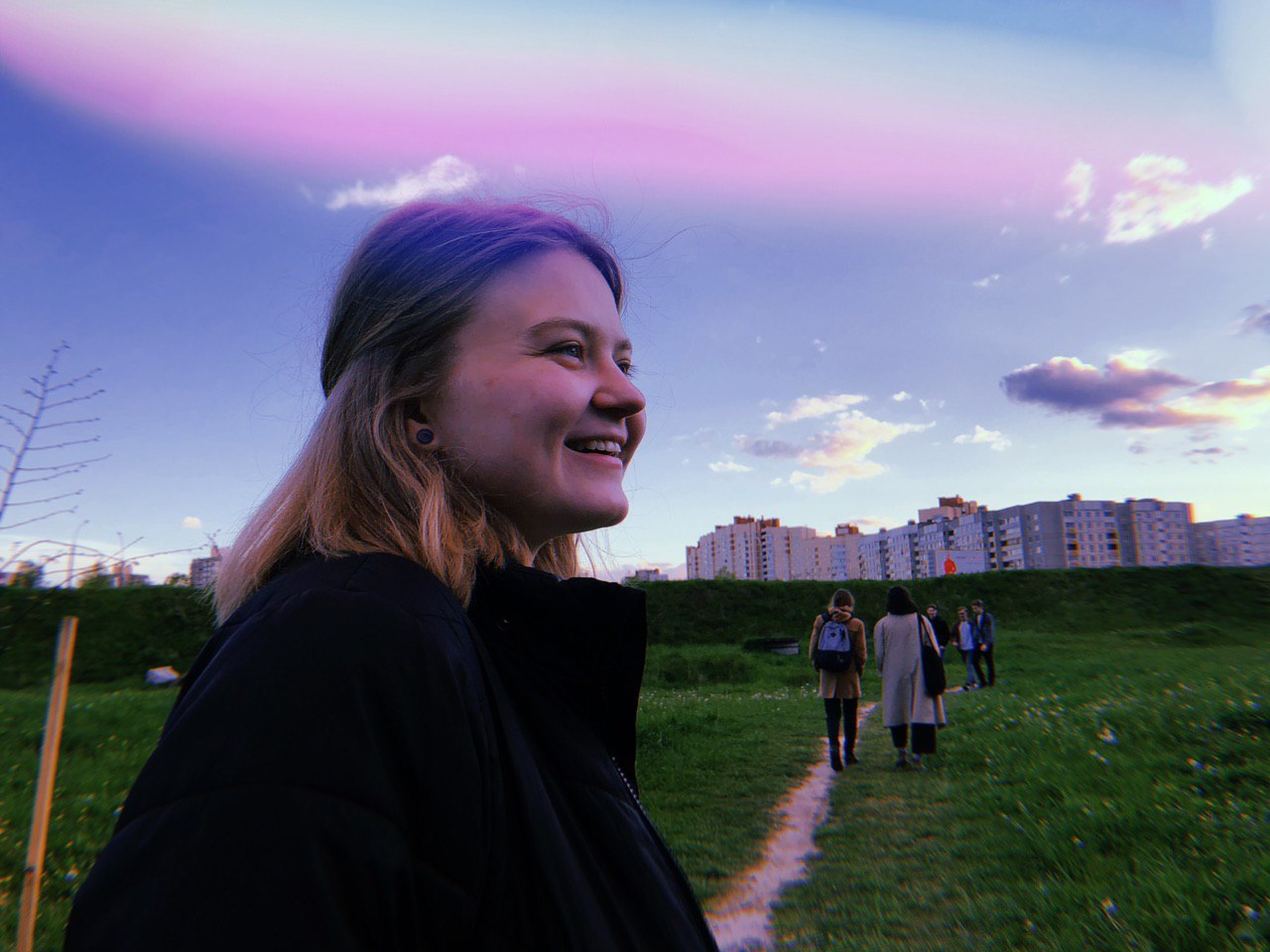
- Arabeika in October 2020
- Born: 17 January 2001 (age 25); Belarus
- Education: Maksim Tank Belarusian State Pedagogical University
- Occupation: Human rights activist
- Years active: 2020–present
- Organization: Belarusian Students' Association
- Known for: Participation in the 2020–2021 Belarusian protests
- Criminal charges: Violating public order
- Criminal penalty: Two and a half years in prison
- Criminal status: Released

Yana Ivanauna Arabeika (Belarusian: Яна Іванаўна Арабейка; born 17 January 2001) is a Belarusian human rights activist. While studying at the Maksim Tank Belarusian State Pedagogical University, she joined the Belarusian Students' Association and participated in the 2020–2021 Belarusian protests. Arabeika was subsequently arrested and imprisoned for her role in the protests, and was recognised as a political prisoner by national and international human rights organisations until her release in 2022.

== Biography ==
Arabeika was born and raised in Belarus, and is the granddaughter of the poet Ivan Arabeika. She studied at the Maksim Tank Belarusian State Pedagogical University in Minsk, where she joined the Belarusian Students' Association.

On 12 November 2020, Arabeika was arrested at a dormitory by the State Security Committee of the Republic of Belarus, as part of a crackdown on students and teachers from higher education institutions across Belarus who had participated in protests against the Belarusian government and the President of Belarus, Alexander Lukashenko, both preceding and following the 2020 presidential election. She was accused of contravening part 1, article 342 of the Criminal Code of Belarus, which forbids the organisation of or participation in group actions that "grossly violate public order". Arabeika was held in pre-trial detention pending the start of her trial.

On 18 November, a joint statement from 15 national human rights organisations, including Viasna, the Belarusian Association of Journalists, the Belarusian Helsinki Committee and the Belarusian PEN Centre, declared Arabeika to be a political prisoner. On 22 December, Annette Widmann-Mauz, a member of the Bundestag in Germany, became Arabeika's symbolic godparent, praising her "exemplary commitment to freedom and democracy". On 20 January 2021, a joint statement from 14 Ukrainian human rights organisations, including the Association of Ukrainian Monitors on Human Rights Conduct in Law Enforcement, the Ukrainian Helsinki Human Rights Union, the Kharkiv Human Rights Protection Group and Skhid SOS described Arabeika's arrest as being "illegal" and her ongoing detention as qualifying as an enforced disappearance.

On 16 July 2021, the Savetski District Court of Minsk sentenced Arabeika to two and a half years in prison. Arabeika had pleaded not guilty to the charges. The judge, Maryna Fyodorova, had since 2020 been sanctioned by the European Union in relation to human rights violations. The ambassadors of several countries, including the Czech Republic, Sweden, the United States and the United Kingdom, were prevented from attending the sentencing by authorities, who stated there was a "lack of seats" in the courtroom.

Arabeika served her sentence at a women's penal colony no. 4 in Gomel, alongside Alana Gebremariam and Ksenia Syramalot, among others. She got married while imprisoned. Arabeika was released on 30 November 2022 after serving her sentence in full, following which she left Belarus.

In 2024, artworks by Arabeika were included in "Belarusian art unbridled", an exhibition featured at the WeHo Festival in the United States as part of its "Art Against War" programme.
