= Legalize Belarus =

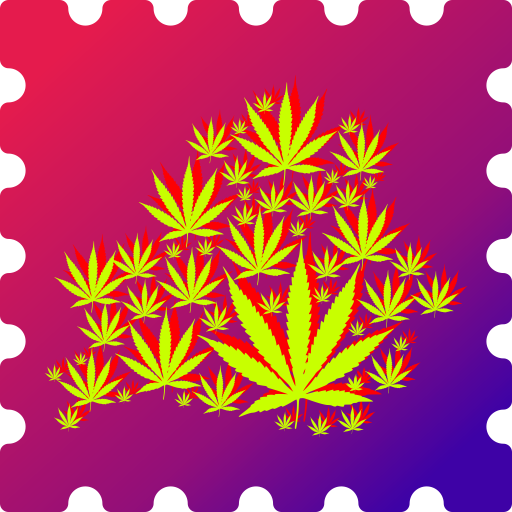
- Formation: 2017
- Purpose: Advocating for drug liberalization
- Official language: Belarusian, Russian, English
- Website: legalizebelarus.org

Legalize Belarus is a Belarusian civil society campaign aimed at drug liberalization, as well as education in the field of the use of psychoactive substances.

Legalize Belarus mainly focuses on delivering education about psychoactive substances and addictions, advocating for decriminalization of small amounts possession and support drug users and people convicted under Article 328 of the Criminal Code of the Republic of Belarus.

== History ==
Legalize Belarus was founded in 2017 in connection with further tightening of the regulation of drug trafficking. The foundation of the campaign was formed by various youth activists, including those from the social movement "Action" and the initiative Students For Liberty Belarus. Together with the movement "Mothers 328", which unites parents of those convicted under Article 328 (Illegal Trafficking in Narcotic Drugs, Psychotropic Substances, Their Precursors and Analogues) of the Criminal Code, a number of Belarusian activists made proposals to defuse the anti-narcotics legislation and announce amnesty for some parts of the Article 328.

As part of the campaign, Legalize Belarus organized a collection of signatures for the decriminalization of cannabis and organized the signing of postcards of solidarity with those convicted under Article 328.

In 2017–2019, activists of Legalize Belarus held a large number of street actions. In spring 2019, activists of the association organized an action of solidarity with people punished for "extremism" and, together with the "Mothers 328" movement, demanded reforms of the anti-drug law.

During the 2019 European Games, Legalize Belarus obtained partial permission for the use of cannabis for the athletes participating in the competition.

In 2019, as part of the 'Support. Don't Punish' Global Day of Action, Legalize Belarus held a festival, which included a concert, workshops, and a rally.

In 2019, activists from Legalize Belarus, along with representatives of the initiatives "Studying is more important" and the Belarusian Students' Association formed the Youth Bloc in order to ran as candidates for the 2019 Belarusian parliamentary election.

== Political repressions ==
Activists of Legalize Belarus have been repeatedly fined and detained for their activities. Thus, at the beginning of 2018, four activists of the association were fined for organizing a cannabis Christmas party for violating the law on mass events.

In May 2018, the Legalize Belarus website was blocked by the Ministry of Internal Affairs. In response, Legalize Belarus activist Piotr Markelau staged a virtual meeting with a proposal to block the ministry's website, for which he was arrested, but not convicted.

In October 2018, special forces detained the participants of a meeting organized on the anniversary of the Legalize Belarus campaign. The detention was carried out around three o'clock in the morning by SOBR fighters in camouflage and with weapons. According to Piotr Markielau from the association, the policemen beat some of the meeting participants and took operational pictures.

== Awards ==
In 2017, the public movement "Action" received the Civil Society Champions award of the Assembly of Pro-Democratic NGOs for its initiative Legalize Belarus.

== Criticism ==
In February 2018, the organizing committee of the Belarusian Christian Democracy criticized Legalize Belarus for "discrediting the democratic opposition and insulting Christians". During a Cannabis Christmas party, members of the initiative walked around the city of Minsk and sang Belarusian Christmas carols, where the Name of Christ was replaced by the word "ganjubas" (ганджубас, slang for "cannabis").
