= Palina Sharenda-Panasiuk =

Belarusian human rights activist (born 1975)

- Паліна Шарэнда-Панасюк
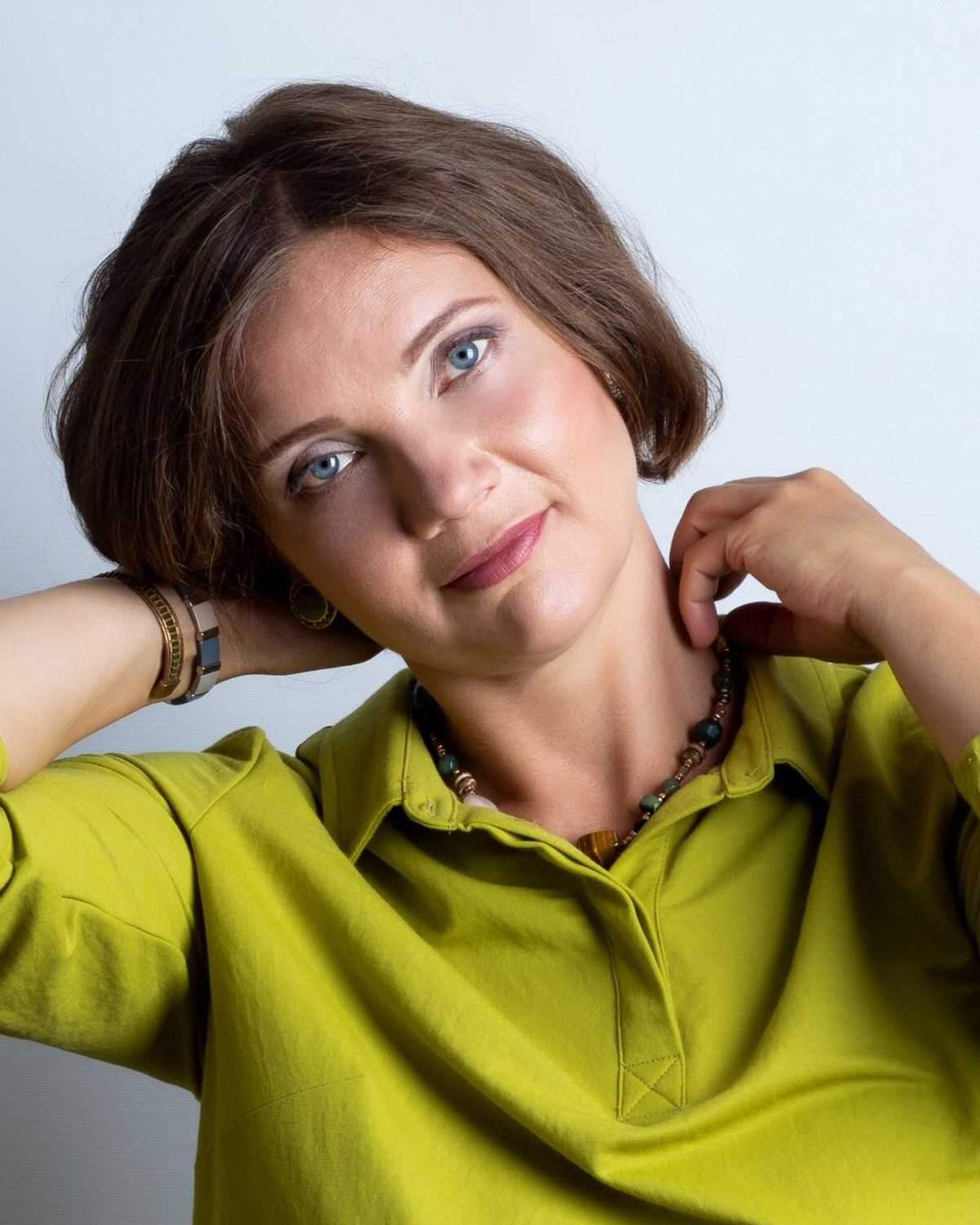
- Sharenda-Panasiuk in 2020
- Born: 21 March 1975 (age 51)
- Education: A.S. Pushkin Brest State University
- Occupation: Human rights activist
- Spouse: Andrei Sharenda (married 2009–present)
- Children: 2

Palina Siarhieuna Sharenda-Panasiuk (Belarusian: Паліна Сяргееўна Шарэнда-Панасюк; born 21 March 1975) is a Belarusian human rights activist. A noted pro-democracy activist in Brest, she is a frequent critic of the President of Belarus, Alexander Lukashenko. In 2021, she was sentenced to two years' imprisonment on charges of insulting state officials and using violence against a police officer. Sharenda-Panaisuk alleged she was tortured in prison, and her sentence was extended on two occasions until she was released in 2025.

== Early life and education ==
Sharenda-Panasiuk studied history at A. S. Pushkin Brest State University. She went on to work as a Belarusian language teacher until the school she worked in was closed by Lukashenko in the 1990s. Followjng this, she moved to Poland where she studied political science at the University of Warsaw. Sharenda-Panasiuk remained in Poland for a period, teaching Polish and history and also spending a time working at the Institute of National Remembrance.

Sharenda-Panasiuk married Andrei Sharenda in 2009, with whom she had two children.

== Activism ==
Sharenda-Panasiuk was one of the founding members of Young Front, a Belarusian pro-democracy youth movement, and led its Brest branch from 1997. She also acted as the regional campaign coordinator of European Belarus, a civil campaign promoting Belarus having closer ties with the European Union.

Sharenda-Panasiuk is a frequent critic of Alexander Lukashenko. In 2006, she publicly supported Alaksandar Milinkievič, the main opposition candidate in the 2006 presidential election, and participated in pro-Milinkievič and pro-democracy marches in Minsk. During the 2010 presidential election, she worked on the campaign of opposition candidate Andrei Sannikov.

In 2019, Sharenda-Panasiuk stood as a candidate for the European Belarus campaign in that year's parliamentary election. She was subsequently removed from the official list of candidates following a television appearance in which she called Lukashenko a "dictator".

== Arrest, trial and imprisonment ==
Previously in 2017 and 2020, Sharenda-Panasiuk's husband Andrei had been arrested and detained for taking part in pro-democracy demonstrations. In January 2021, Andrei was arrested; following this, Sharenda-Panasiuk posted a video on Telegram in which she described the police officers who arrested her husband as "fascists and punishers". Subsequently, police officers conducted an inspection of her home, during which Sharenda-Panasiuk was arrested. She was charged with "insulting state officials" and "using violence against a police officer" after it was alleged that she had scratched a police officer on the arm during the inspection.

While Sharenda-Panasiuk was in detention, Andrei was placed under home arrest again in May 2021 on charges of "contempt of the President" and "calls for action aiming to hamr the national securit of Belarus". He was able to flee the country with their children, settling in Lithuania.

On 9 June 2021, the Maskowski District Court sentenced Sharenda-Panasiuk to 24 months' imprisonment. Sharenda-Panasiuk had been denied legal representation during the trial and had refused to give evidence, stating she would only testify at a future international tribunal for Lukashenko's crimes; she described the court as "Stalin's troika" and stated she would not accept its verdict.

In custody, it was alleged that Sharenda-Panasiuk had been subject to torture and mistreatment, including being repeatedly placed in punishment cells; having letters and medications withheld from her; not being provided with a mattress or bedding; and being denied hot water and hearing. Sharenda-Panasiuk also reported that she had been assaulted by other prisoners on the orders of prison administrators.

In February 2022, while in a penal colony in Gomel, Sharenda-Panasiuk was charged with "malicious disobedience to demands of penal institution administration". A judge from the Čyhunačny District court sentenced her to an additional year in prison on 7 April. Sharenda-Panasiuk appealed the sentence; the appeal was heard on 8 June 2022 at Gomel Regional Court, where the sentence was upheld. She was subsequently held at penal colony no. 24 in Zarechcha. Sharenda-Panasiuk was the first woman to charged with disobedience whilst in state custody.

In 2023, it was reported that Sharenda-Panasiuk had filed an official application for the renunciation of her Belarusian citizenship in protest to torture and mistreatment she had experienced in detention. In June, she was temporarily transferred to Minsk to undergo a psychiatric assessment, one of four she underwent during her detainment. She also went on hunger strike, ending it a week later when her prison conditions improved.

On 2 October 2023, the Rechytsa District Court considered additional disobedience charges levied against Sharenda-Panasiuk. During her trial, she stated she had been tortured in prison. She was sentenced to a further additional year in prison; an appeal hearing at Gomel Regional Court on 15 December upheld the sentence.

On 21 May 2024, which was due to be Sharenda-Panasiuk's release date, she was charged with disobedience for a third time, causing her sentence to be extended. In July, her family reported that she had been diagnosed with chronic pancreatitis. That September, it was reported that she was only receiving painkillers to treat her condition.

On 1 February 2025, Sharenda-Panasiuk was released from prison after serving 1491 days in detention, including 270 days in punishment cells.

== Response ==
Viasna and other human rights organizations in Belarus have recognized Palina Sharenda-Panasiuk as a political prisoner.

On 21 July 2021, a group of Members of the European Parliament became symbolic godparents of Belarusian political prisoners. Isabel Santos was named as Sharenda-Panasiuk's godmother, and released a statement describing the proceedings against Sharenda-Panasiuk as "illegal", stating that no one should be in prison for exercising their right to freedom of expression.

In January 2024, Sharenda-Panasiuk's husband Andrei registered a complaint with the United Nations Committee on the Elimination of Discrimination Against Women, accusing Belarusian authorities of discrimination against his wife. In March, CEDAW requested that Belarus take interim measures to protect Sharenda-Panasiuk, citing concerns about her declining health in prison.

In May 2024, the Human Rights Foundation and Viasna submitted a joint petition to the UN Working Group on Arbitrary Detention, urging it to declare Sharenda-Panasiuk as being arbitrarily detained under international law.

The HRF celebrated Sharenda-Panasiuk's release from prison, praising her "bravery and unconditional support for a democratic and pluralistic Belarus".

== Recognition ==
In 2021, Sharenda-Panasiuk received the Cross of Pyotr Kozlovsky from the government of Ukraine for "dignity in captivity". Later that year, she received the Stories of Injustice Award from the Czech Republic alongside Nikita Emelyanov and Ksenia Syramalot.

In 2023, Sharenda-Panasiuk was awarded the Medal of the Order of Pursuit from the Rada of the Belarusian Democratic Republic.
