= A.S. Pushkin Brest State University =

Public university in Brest, Belarus

Coordinates: 52.137242°N 23.67234°E

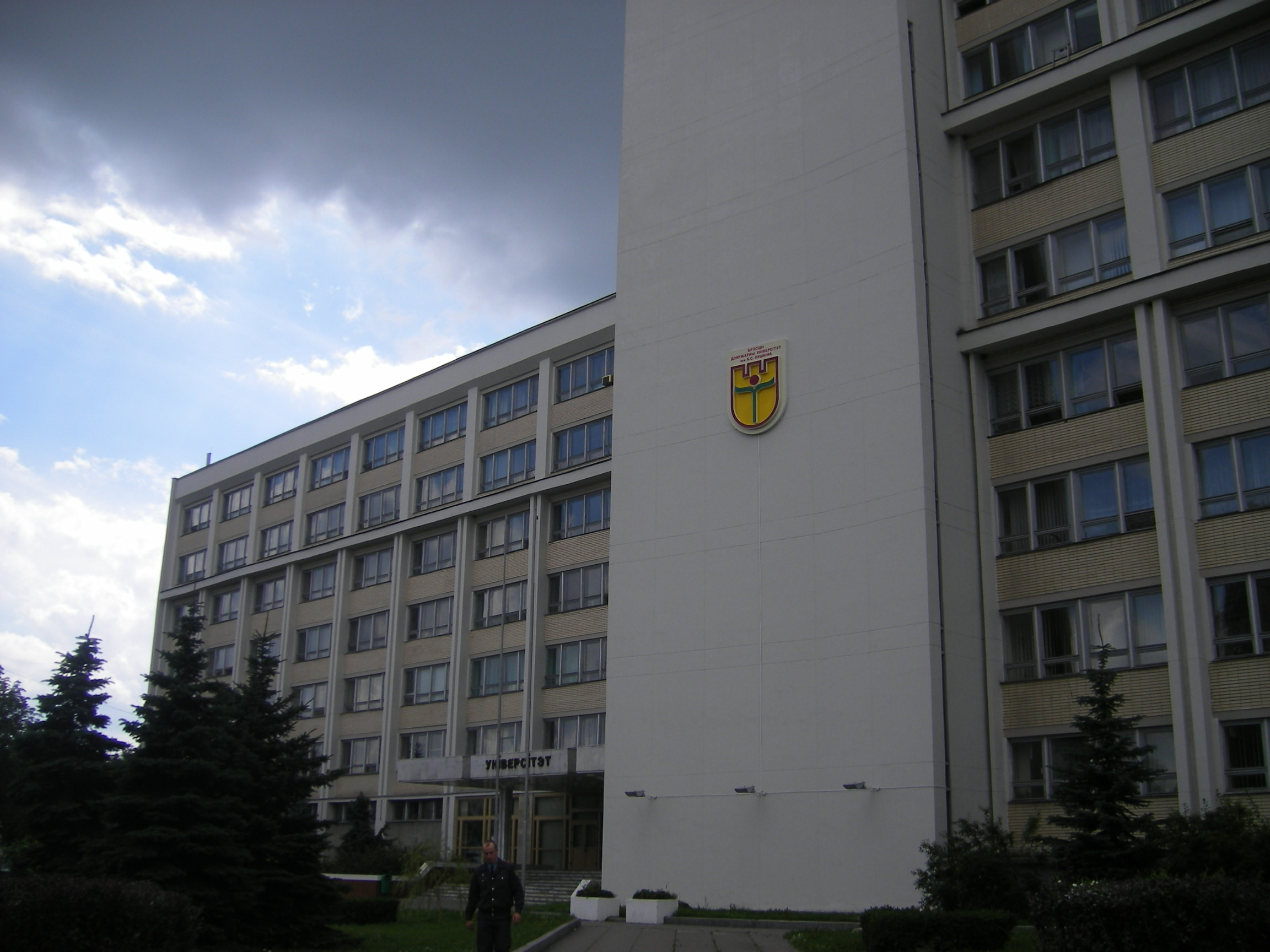
Brest State University

A.S. Pushkin Brest State University (Belarusian: Брэсцкі дзяржаўны ўніверсітэт імя А. С. Пушкіна, romanized: Brestski dzyarzhawny wnivyersitet imya A. S. Pushkina; Russian: Брестский государственный университет имени А. С. Пушкина, romanized: Brestsky gosudarstvenny universitet imeni A. S. Pushkina) is an institution of higher education in Brest, Belarus. Founded in 1945 (81 years ago) as the Brest State Teachers' Training Institute, it was reorganised into Brest State Pedagogical Institute in 1950 (76 years ago), and eventually into a university in 1995 (31 years ago). It was named after Alexander Pushkin.

== Notable alumni ==
- Palina Sharenda-Panasiuk, human rights activist.
