= Yevgen Zakharov =

Human rights activist

Yevgen Yukhymovych Zakharov
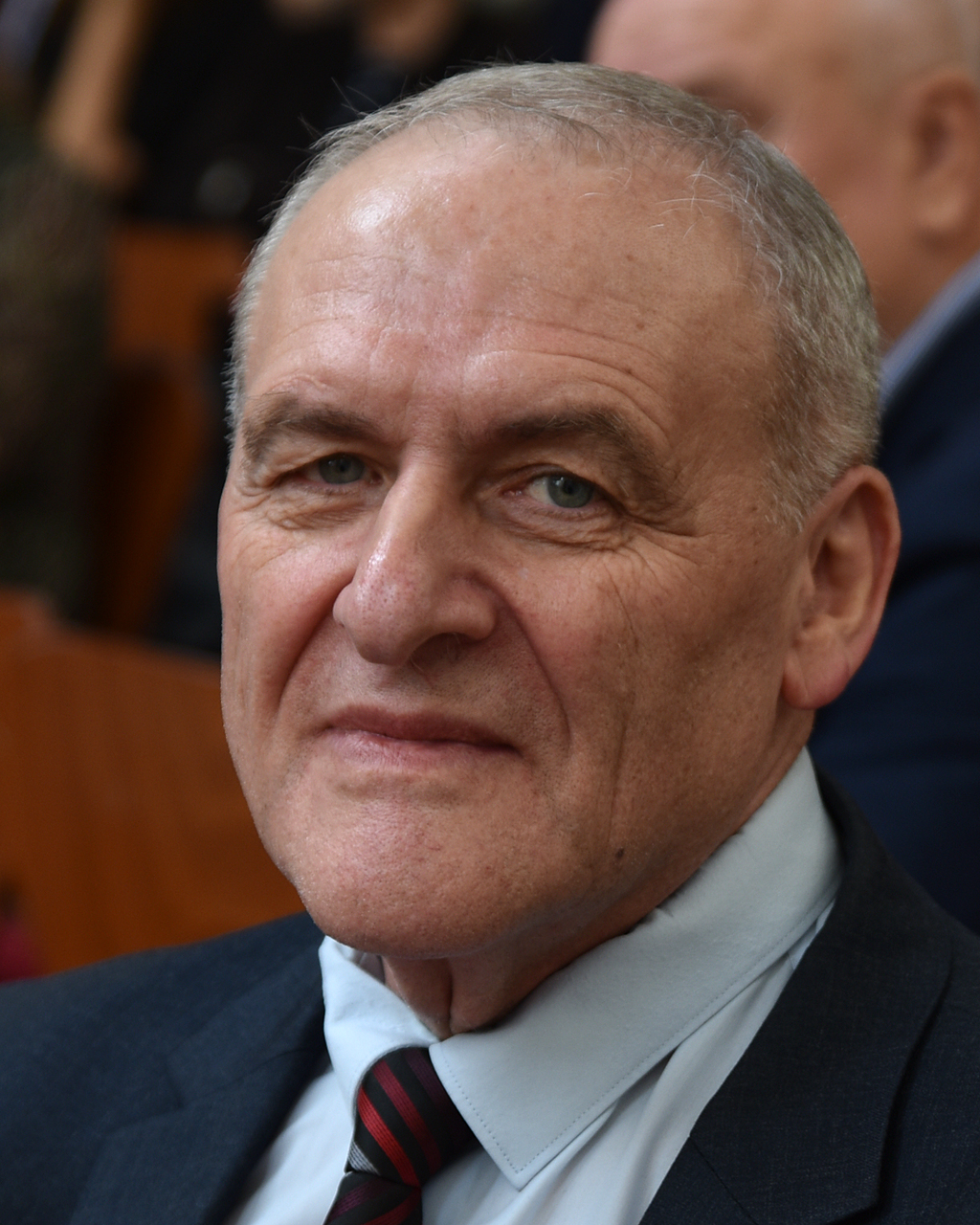
- Yevhen Zakharov (2023)
- Born: 12 November 1952 (age 73); Kharkiv, Ukrainian SSR, Soviet Union
- Education: Kharkiv National University
- Occupation: Director of Kharkiv Human Rights Protection Group
- Years active: 2011–present

Yevgen Yukhymovych Zakharov (Ukrainian: Євген Юхимович Захаров; born 12 November 1952) is a Ukrainian human rights activist and member of the Ukrainian PEN. He is a chairman of the board of the Ukrainian Helsinki Human Rights Union, Director of the Kharkiv Human Rights Group. He was an activist in the dissident movement of the 1970s and 1980s.

== Biography ==
Zakharov was born on November 12, 1952, in the city of Kharkiv.

=== Education ===
- 1960–1970 – Zakharov studied at the secondary school, Kharkiv
- 1970–1975 – he graduated from the Faculty of Mechanics and Mathematics of the Kharkiv State University, graduating with honors
- 1982–1985 – Zakharov was a graduate student of the Rostov Institute of Railway Engineers
- 1985 – he became Candidate of Sciences (Technology)
- September 1996 – Zakharov was a participant of the USIA’s International Visitors Program “Development of Democracy in Multiethnic Societies” (USA)
- August 1998 – he studied at first school on monitoring human rights, Helsinki Foundation (Warsaw)

== Work ==
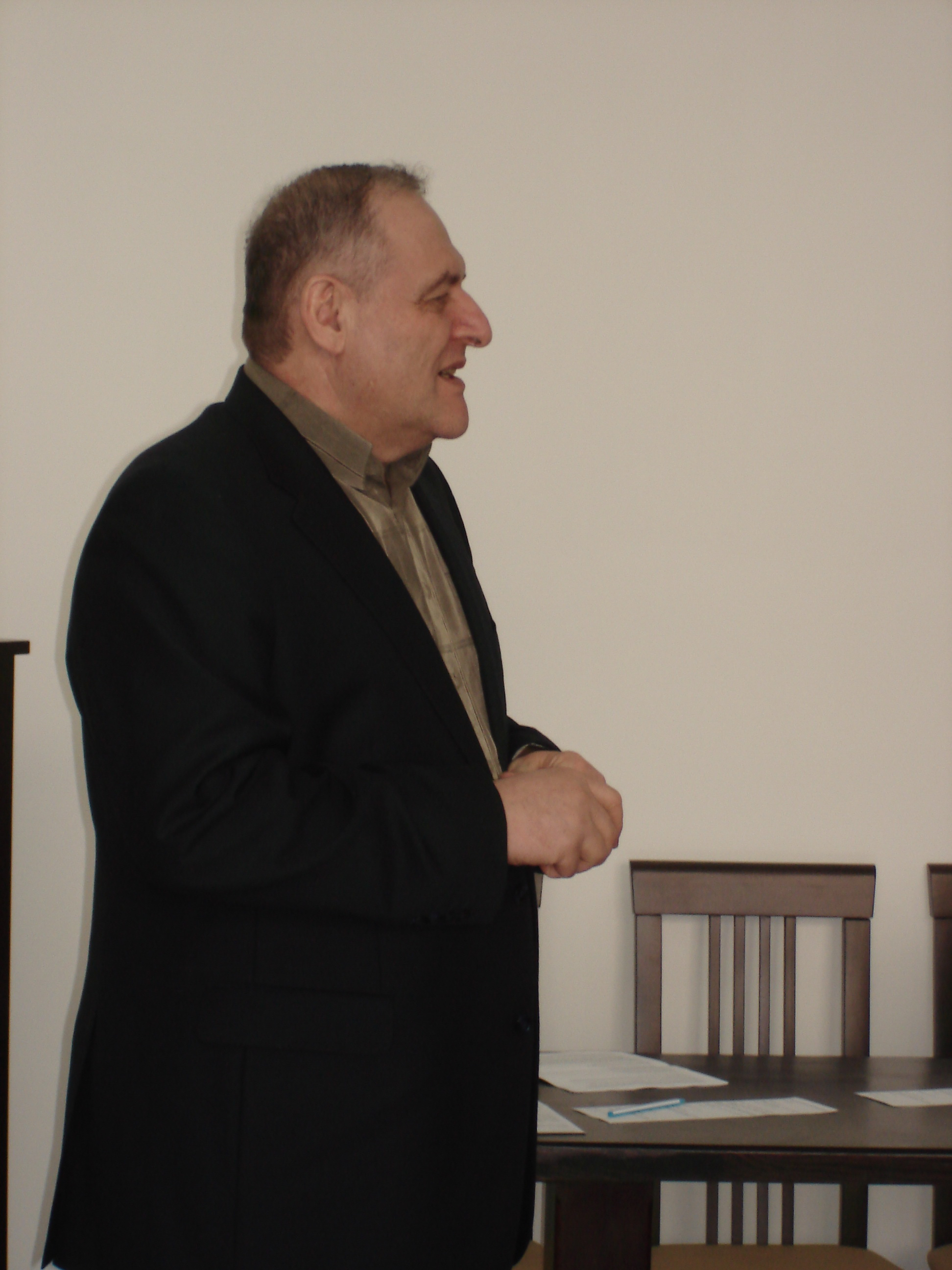
Yevgen Zakharov (April 2013)

In 1975–1987, he worked as an engineer-mathematician, Special Design Bureau of Electric Motors, Kharkiv.

In 1987–1993, Zakharov was head of the bureau on automation of the design of electric machines and apparatus of the Kharkiv Electro-Mechanical Plant.

In 1988–1992, Zakharov was a correspondent for the Express Chronicle newspaper.

Since 1990 he has been the deputy chairman of the Kharkiv City Commission for the Restoration of the Rights of the Rehabilitated and Repressed.

In 1990–1994, he was a deputy of the Kharkiv City Council.

In 1993–1997, he was editor-in-chief of the journal Human Rights in Ukraine (edition of the Ukrainian-American Bureau on Human Rights Protection, since 1993 21 issues have been published).

Since February 1997 Zakharov is an executive director of the Kharkiv Human Rights Protection Group, editor-in-chief of the weekly Prava Ludyny ("Human Rights") and quarterly Freedom of Expression and Privacy.

== Public activities ==
He has also participated in the law-protective movement since the 1970s.

In 1989, Zakharov became co-chair of the Kharkiv Memorial, he held a position until 1992.

In 1989–2002, he was a member of the Moscow Helsinki Group.

In 1992–2011, Zakharov was a co-chairperson of the Kharkiv Human Rights Protection Group.

Since 1995 he is a member of the Ukrainian Section of the International Society for Human Rights.

In 2004–2008 he headed the board of the Ukrainian Helsinki Human Rights Union.

In 2010–2011, he was a member of the board of the Ukrainian Helsinki Human Rights Union.

Since 2011, he is a director of the Kharkiv Human Rights Protection Group.

Since 25 January 2012, he is a head of the board of the Ukrainian Helsinki Human Rights Union.

== Social activities ==
17 November 2006 several Ukrainian NGOs proposed him to be elected as ombudsman. As a result of the civic campaign, he was officially nominated as ombudsman and voted in Ukrainian Parliament. He lost to Nina Karpachova.

28 January 2012 Ukrainian Helsinki Human Rights Union suggested him for a position of ombudsman again.

7 February 2012 opposition in Ukrainian Parliament decided to nominate him for an ombudsman.

On 15 March 2012 Ukrainian Parliament could not elect an ombudsman. Zakharov received 132 votes.

In 2014–2015, he was a member of the Competition Commission, which is responsible for nominating candidates for the position of Director of the National Anti-Corruption Bureau of Ukraine. Zakharov was appointed by the quota of the President of Ukraine.

In June 2018, he supported an open letter from cultural figures, politicians, and human rights activists calling on world leaders to defend Ukrainian prisoner Oleg Sentsov and other political prisoners.

=== Campaign (2006–2007) ===
The campaign "Zakharov to the ombudsman!" (Ukrainian: "Захарова – в омбудсмени!") started on November 17, 2006. The campaign aimed to nominate Zakharov, a well-known human rights activist, to the post of the Verkhovna Rada Commission for Human Rights. His candidacy was supported by more than 340 non-governmental organizations in Ukraine and more than 120 international organizations.

Zakharov was registered by the profile committee of the Verkhovna Rada as an official candidate for the position of the Commissioner for Human Rights. It happened because of the support of the people's initiative by some deputies from the BYuT – Yulia Tymoshenko Bloc (Ukrainian: БЮТ, Блок Юлії Тимошенко) and Our Ukraine–People's Self-Defense Bloc (Ukrainian: Наша Україна – Народна самооборона) factions. They collected the required number of signatures under the appeal to the Chairman of the Verkhovna Rada and the profile committee of the Verkhovna Rada. 121 people's deputies from the BYuT, SPU, Out Ukraine, and Party of Regions factions supported Zakharov's candidacy for the post of Ombudsman. During the vote in the Verkhovna Rada, 154 people's deputies supported Zakharov.

A significant achievement of the campaign was the actualization of problems in the work of the ombudsman, drawing attention to them both the Ukrainian and European community.

Another important achievement was the willingness to take public control of the ombudsman's activities, regardless of the person holding the position. The campaign became an example of uniting the efforts of public and human rights organizations in building civil society in Ukraine.

=== Ombudsman elections in 2012 ===
On January 28, 2012, The board of the Ukrainian Helsinki Human Rights Union invited deputies to elect Zakharov as ombudsman.

On February 7, 2012, the factions of the Verkhovna Rada of BYuT and NUNS adopted a joint decision to nominate Zakharov to the post of the Verkhovna Rada Commissioner for Human Rights.

On March 15, 2012, the Verkhovna Rada failed to elect the Verkhovna Rada Commissioner for Human Rights. The candidacy of Valeria Lutkovskaya was supported by 212 people's deputies. Zakharov received 134 votes.

=== Reform of the Ministry of Internal Affairs ===
After the Revolution of Dignity, Zakharov was appointed chairman of the Expert Council for Police Reform at the Ministry of Internal Affairs of Ukraine, which was established in April 2014 on behalf of Interior Minister Arsen Avakov.

== Publications ==
11 scientific articles on applied mathematics and design of electric machines (1976–1985) and more than 200 publications devoted to human rights, civil society and history of political repressions in the Soviet Union and Ukraine. Publications were printed in Ukraine, Russia, the US, Canada, Germany, France, Lithuania, Poland, Norway, Denmark (1987–2010).

His works include

- Ukraine Genocide Analysis
- Human Dimension of the Ukrainian Famine
- Respect for economic, social and cultural rights in Ukraine
- Selected decisions of the European Court of Human Rights of Ukraine - 2006
- Human rights - my personal opinion 2000

His was referenced in 2008 Human Rights Reports: Ukraine

== Awards ==
1. Award of the President of Ukraine — anniversary medal "25 years of independence of Ukraine", 2016
2. Laureate of Vasyl Stus Prize, January 2012
3. Member of the Order of Liberty, October 2008.
4. The Independent Cultural Journal “Ї” Award «For Intellectual Courage», December 2007
