= Belarusian Students' Association =

Youth organization in Belarus

- Abbreviation: BSA
- Formation: 1988 (officially registered in 1992)
- Headquarters: Poznań, Poland
- Members: 9 students' unions
- Official language: Belarusian
- Affiliations: European Students' Union
- Website: zbsunion.org

The Belarusian Students' Association (Belarusian: Задзіночанне Беларускіх Студэнтаў, Zadzninochannie Belaruskikh Studentau; BSA) is the oldest youth organization of independent Belarus with the self-proclaimed goal of "consolidation of the Belarusian student movement for the revival of the principles of democracy, legality and fulfillment of human rights and freedoms in Belarus"

The BSA emerged as an anti-communist youth organization in the late 1980s and united democratic student groups in a single union. In 1992, the BSA was officially registered by the Ministry of Justice. It was deregistered in 2001. The association continued its activities and was repeatedly the target of political repression.

== History ==
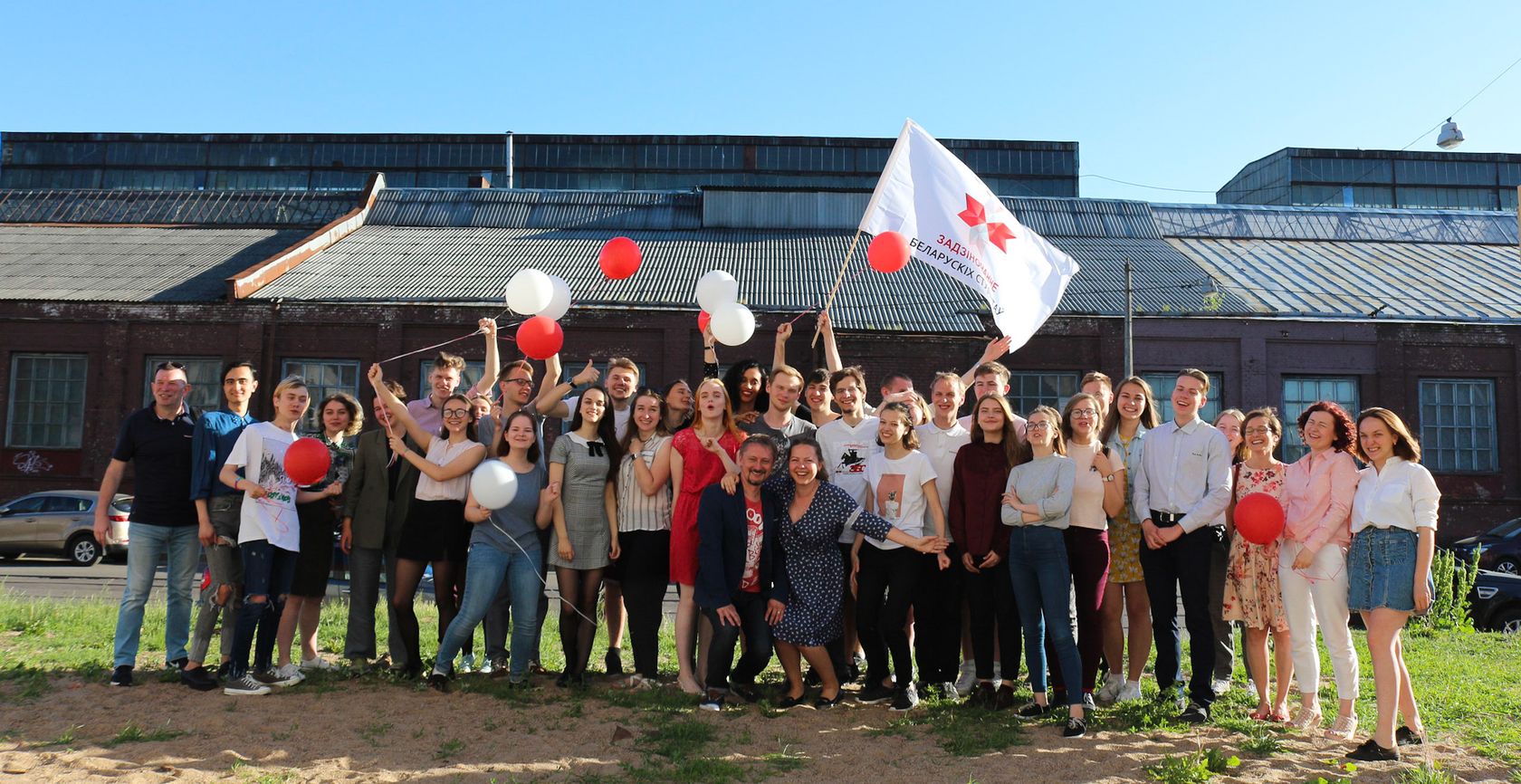
Activists of the Belarusian Students' Association at the organization's 30th anniversary celebration

During the Perestroika period, interest clubs emerged in Belarusian universities. Among the most active were: the community "Svitanak" on the basis of the Belarusian State Technological University, which organized the issue of the first independent student media outlet of the country, "Studentskaya Dumka", as well as informal student associations of the Belarusian State University, the Belarusian State Medical University and the Maksim Tank Belarusian State Pedagogical University. These universities became the basis of the Belarusian Students' Association. The self-proclaimed goal was to fight against the ideologicalization of higher education and the promotion of the ideas of reforming the education system in a modern way.

In 1992, the BSA was officially registered in the Ministry of Justice. The association published the Belarusian-language student newspaper "Studentskaya Dumka", while representative offices in the cities of Orsha, Novopolotsk, Vitebsk and Baranavichy each produced Belarusian-language student newspapers of their own. The circulation of these outlets was restricted to 299 copies to avoid the need to register with the State Press Committee.

After the election of Alexander Lukashenko as president, the BSA organized a series of protest actions, including for the increase of scholarships and material well-being of students. The newspaper "Studentskaya Dumka" became to grow. In the 1990s, the circulation was more than 5,000 copies per month. In 1999, the Belarusian Students' Association joined the European Students' Union.

Prior to the 2001 Belarusian presidential election, activists of the BSA held a series of pickets with a call to vote in the elections and prevent fraud. On September 7, 2001, the office of the association was searched and all campaign materials were confiscated. In the same year, the BSA was deprived of registration with a ban on re-registration for a period of 15 years. Despite that, the activists continued their activities. For example, in 2005−2006, the association became the initiator of the "We want to learn in Belarusian" campaign demanding the creation of Belarusian-language programs in universities.

In May 2016, a reboot of the Belarusian Students' Association with a new work priority took place: uniting the student movement to defend common rights and interests. The BSA supported the 2017 Belarusian protests and a "Student Block" was organized for joint participation in peaceful actions, as well as a mutual aid fund of students to collect money for fines for those arrested.

In 2019, activists from the Belarusian Students' Association, along with representatives of the initiatives "Studying is more important" and Legalize Belarus formed the Youth Bloc in order to ran as candidates for the 2019 Belarusian parliamentary election.

=== Repressions after 2020 ===
The BSA documented cases of repression against students during the 2020–2021 Belarusian protests. As of 17 May 2021, according to the BSA, at least 466 students have been detained, almost a third of whom are women. Many were put under administrative detention or fined an average of 120 Euros. At least 153 students have been arbitrarily expelled from universities.

The association itself also became the target of repression once again. On November 12, 2020, Belarusian authorities detained leaders and activists of the Belarusian Students' Association, and the apartments of members of the student union and the organization's office were searched. Five members were placed in the Amerikanka pre-Trial Detention Centre of the KGB. A dozen members were forced to flee the country. Among those who were repressed was also Alana Gebremariam, representative of ex-presidential candidate Sviatlana Tsikhanouskaya for youth and students, press secretary Ksenia Syramalot; and member Yana Arabeika, the granddaughter of the noted poet Ivan Arabeika. They were suspected of committing a crime under Article 342 of the Criminal Code ("Organization and preparation of actions that grossly violate public order, or active participation in them"). The Belarusian Association of Journalists, the Belarusian Helsinki Committee, PEN Belarus and the Viasna Human Rights Centre called the detentions baseless and politically motivated and demanded the immediate release of the BSA activists. On November 30, 2022, almost all of those who had been illegally arrested on November 12, 2020, and subsequently convicted in the “student case”, were released. They have served their sentences in full.

In August 2023, the social networks and the logo of the Belarusian Students' Association were included by the Belarusian authorities in the "list of extremist materials". By decision of the KGB of September 21, 2023, the Association was included in the list of “extremist groups”. Taking part in activities of such a group is a crime in Belarus.
