= Youth Bloc =

Belarusian youth social movement

Youth Bloc (Moladzevy Blok)
- Abbreviation: MB
- Formation: 2019
- Headquarters: Poznań, Poland
- Official language: Belarusian
- Affiliations: International Federation of Liberal Youth (associate member); European Liberal Youth (associate member)
- Website: moladzbel.org

The Youth Bloc (Belarusian: Моладзевы блок, Moladzevy blok) is a Belarusian social movement that emerged as an association of social activists and bloggers during the 2019 Belarusian parliamentary election. It is officially registered as a fund in Poznań, Poland.

The Youth Bloc is represented in the Coordination Council and is an associate member of the International Federation of Liberal Youth and a full member of the European Liberal Youth.

== Goals and activities ==
According its website, the Youth Bloc is especially focused on researching the values and views of the Belarusian youth, organizing an informal school on the problem of inhumane drug policy, supporting political education and reforming the Belarusian army, as well as the anti-drug legislation, the Parliament of the Republic of Belarus and compulsory assignment of students.

== History ==
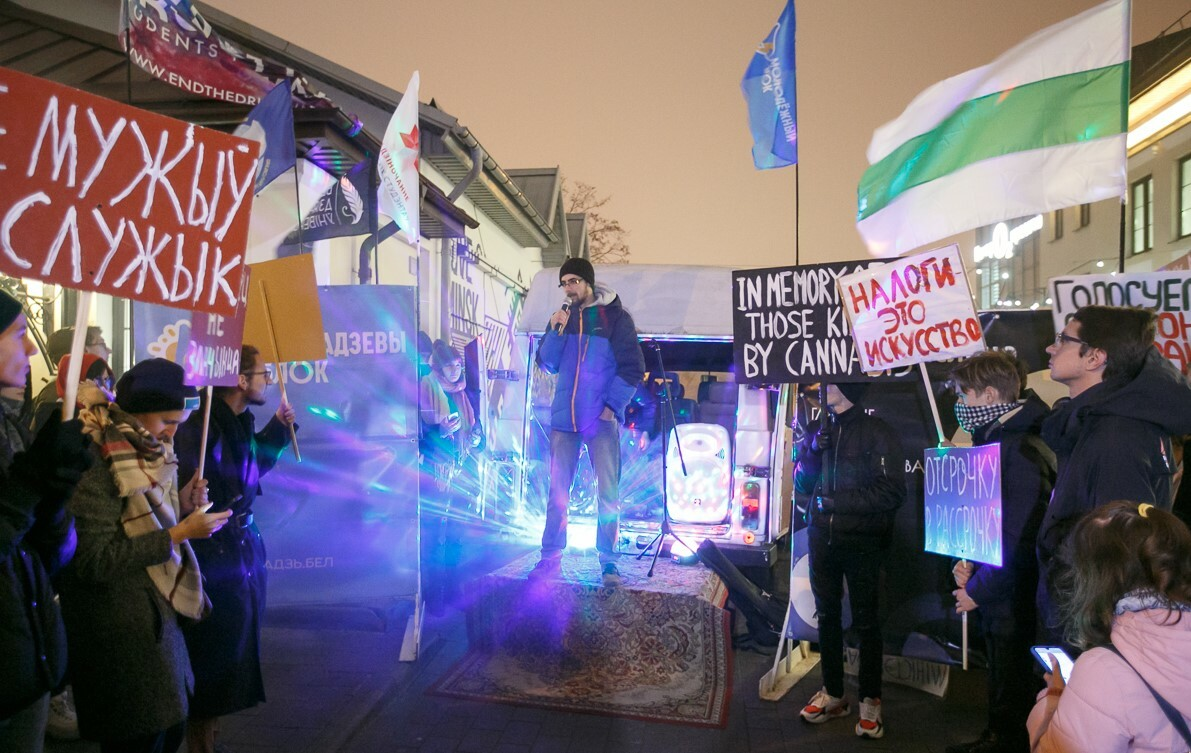
A meeting of the Youth Bloc in Minsk in November 2019

=== Foundation ===
Initially, the Youth Bloc consisted of eight young people who were registered as candidates for the 2019 Belarusian parliamentary election. The official intention of Youth Bloc was to put youth issues on the agenda in Belarus by organizing small street protests and pickets, online campaigns, or street campaigning. The Youth Bloc was formed of activists from the initiatives Belarusian Students' Association, "Studying is more important" and Legalize Belarus. All eight activists ran as candidates for the Belarusian Social Democratic Assembly. Among them was also pro-democracy activist Alana Gebremariam.

In late 2019, the Youth Bloc organized several demonstrations, including a protest against mandatory voting. On the last day of campaigning, on November 16, the Youth Bloc organized a "rave rally" in the historical center of Minsk. The activists called for people to come to the polls on the main voting day and vote for the candidates of the Youth Bloc. The meeting brought together about 100 people, making it the largest election event of the entire parliamentary campaign. According to the official results, none of the Youth Bloc candidates passed to the House of Representatives. Election observers from the Organization for Security and Cooperation in Europe said that "fundamental freedoms were disregarded and the integrity of the election process was not adequately safeguarded".

=== After the Parliamentary elections 2019 ===
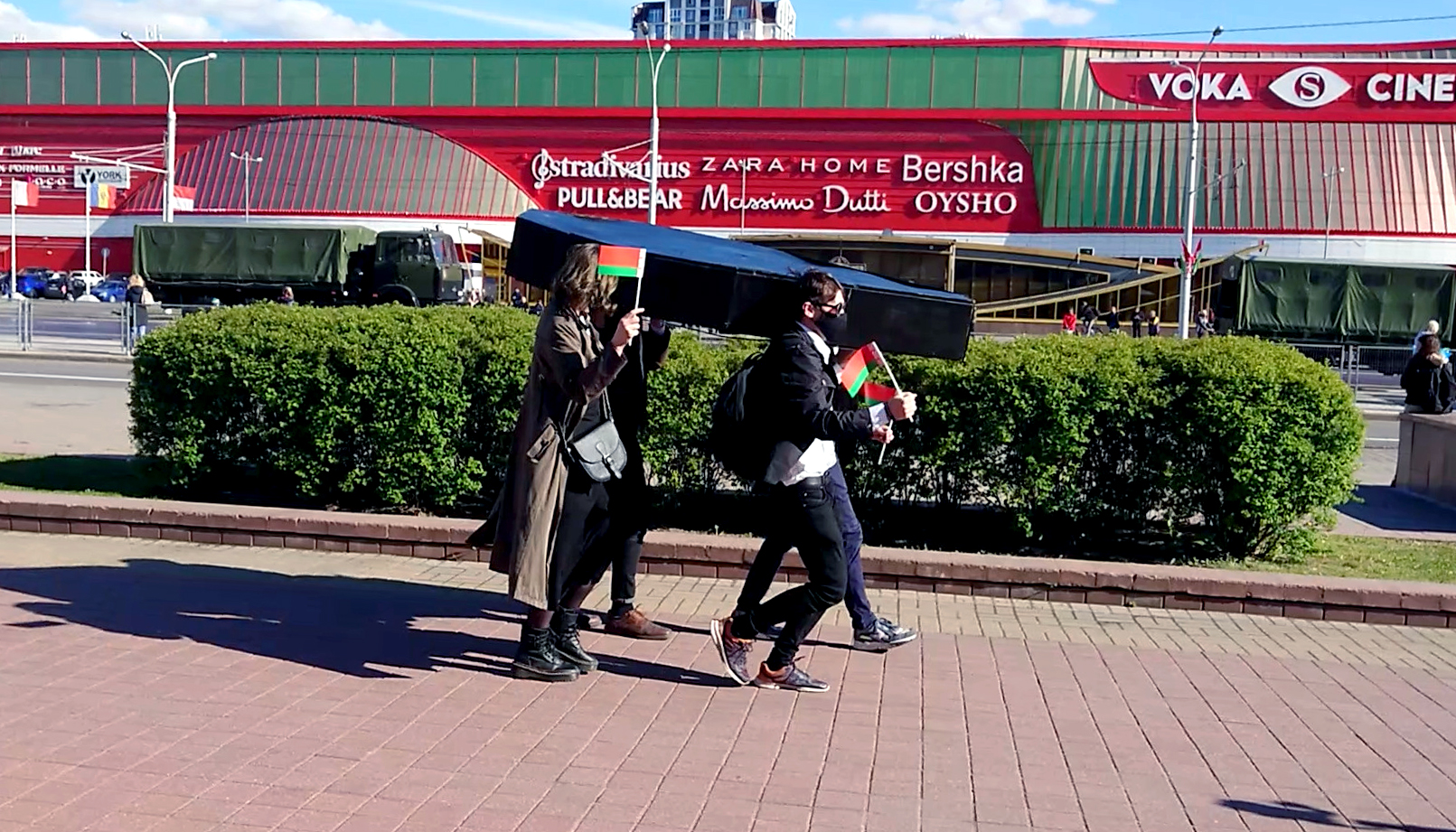
Youth Bloc activists marching with a coffin alongside the military column during the 9 May Victory Day Parade rehearsal.

After the elections, the Youth Bloc decided to continue its activities. On May 8, 2020, the Youth Bloc organized a performance against the authorities’ decision to maintain the parade despite the COVID-19 pandemic. The activists carried a coffin along Independence Avenue where the official parade rehearsal took place. Four of the activists were subsequently detained; two of them were sentenced to 13 and 5 days of detention. In the same month, the association launched a website about people who died from the coronavirus in Belarus. The creators plan to tell a short biography or memories about each victim of the epidemic.

In the run-up to the 2020 Belarusian presidential election, the Youth Bloc supported the protest movement, but did not openly support any of the candidates. On July 29, 2020, Youth Bloc activist Piotr Markelau was arrested near the building of the pre-trial detention center No. 1 for an action of solidarity with a detained political prisoner. Markelau subsequently received 10 days of arrest.

On September 16, 2020, Belarusian dictator Alexander Lukashenko in a speech described several phases of an attempted "destruction of Belarus". In this context, he also mentioned the Youth Bloc:

For example, the "Youth Bloc" was specially created for the elections under the pretext of nominating candidates for the parliament actively shaped the mood of discontent in various social groups. For this purpose, seemingly non-political topics were exploited: the law on deferrals, student placement, legalization of drugs, the well-known topic of Article 328 of the Criminal Code, and so on.

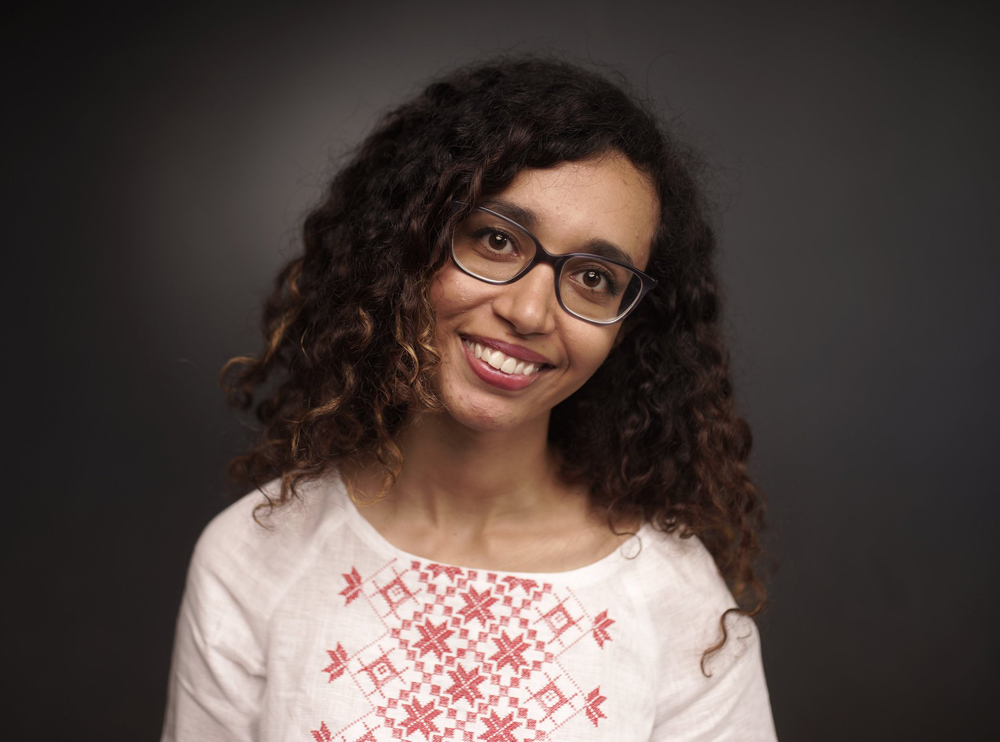
Alana Gebremariam, Youth Bloc activist and former political prisoner

On November 12, 2020, on the so-called "Black Thursday", the apartments of a number of activists of the Youth Bloc and the Belarusian Students' Association were searched. Some activists, including Alana Gebremariam, were detained and placed in the KGB detention center. The activists Danila Lauretski and Elizaveta Prokopchik managed to escape from KGB persecution and moved to Ukraine by illegally crossing the border with Russia. Gebremariam was later recognized as a political prisoner along with other defendants in the case and sentenced to 2 years and 6 months in prison. She was released in November 2022.

In September 2022, the online resources of the Youth Bloc were recognized as an extremist formation by the Belarusian Ministry of Internal Affairs.
