= Civil Society Champions =

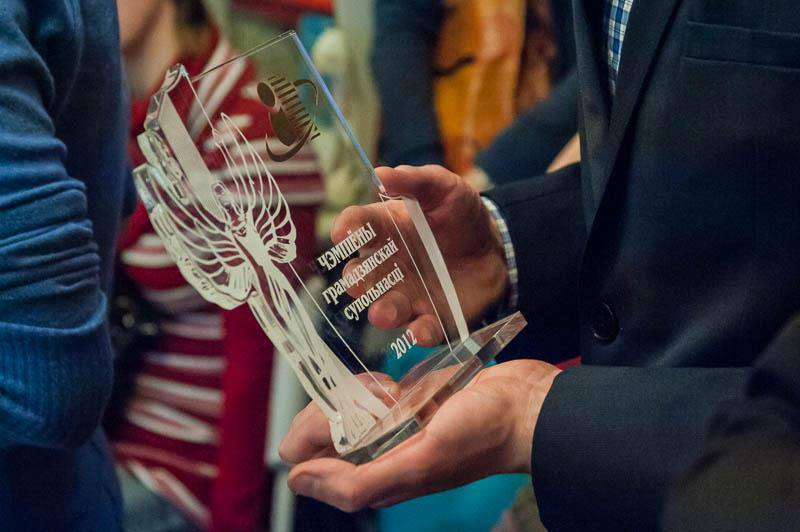

Civil Society Champions is an annual award ceremony launched by the Assembly of Pro-Democratic NGOs in 2009. It is held to honor the most prominent civil activists, significant events, and organizations in the Belarusian civil sector. The first ceremony took place on 23 December 2009 in Minsk.

== Goals ==
The main goals of the Civil Society Champions award ceremony are:

- to systematize the activities of the Belarusian civil sector over the year;
- to encourage civil society activists for further work;
- to present to the public the achievements and best practices of NGOs in various fields through a wide media coverage.

The list of nominees is formed by the Executive Bureau and the Working Group of the Assembly. After that, the Board shortlists the nominees, and the voting process begins. Civil activists, NGO leaders, and experts vote for a candidate, and the Executive Bureau members process the voting results.

== Winners ==
=== 2009 ===
On 23 December 2009, the most outstanding community initiatives and civil campaigns were given awards in an informal ceremony. This was the first such ceremony to be held.

- Non-registration of the Year – to the Ministry of Justice of the Republic of Belarus.
- The Civil Campaign of the Year – to a joint initiative of the Belarusian human rights defenders, "Human Rights Defenders against the Death Penalty in Belarus."
- Regional Event of the Year – to a large NGO Forum of the Assembly of the Mahiliou. region, which brought together more than 80 activists from democratic associations in Mahiliou.
- Creative Input of the Year – to a procession of Santa Clauses to the prosecutor's office, seeking to repeal criminal article 193.1 as part of the Stop 193.1 campaign.
- For Kindness in Action – to a group of bloggers who organized themselves in order to help an orphanage.
- For Human Treatment of Animals – to a campaign in support of homeless animals carried out by a number of organizations and entities: public associations "Aegis" and "Salvation", "Protection of Life", "Pets", former volunteers of "Fauna of the City", "Initiative", "Belarusian Music Alternative", and others.
- The Most Absurd Denial of the Year – to the Main Justice Department of the Hrodna Regional Executive Committee. Officials refused to register the "Zalaty Leu" (eng: "Golden Lion") social NGO on the grounds that the charter of the organization does not explain the chosen name "Zalaty Leu".

=== 2013 ===
In 2013, the following awards were presented:

- The prize in the nomination Campaign of the Year was awarded to the "Let's Make It Better!–2013" campaign held by the Assembly of NGOs.
- The prize in the nomination New Initiative went to Kaciaryna Kibalchych, who launched Belarusian-language courses "Mova ci cava".
- The prize in the nomination Regional Event of the Year was awarded to the people's strikes against the mass killings of domestic pigs. The award was received by one of the Mahiliou region activists, Kaciaryna Muzykantava.
- The prize in the nomination Place of the Year was awarded to the creative platform "CEH" and was received by one of its founders, photographer Julia Daraskevich.
- There were two winners in the nomination Creative Input of the Year: PRacounia of social advertising and a personal initiative to establish a private monument commemorating Kalinouski rebels.
- The prize in the nomination Screw Up of the Year went to the authorities who fined the organizers of the bike ride "Mods on Bikes".
- The award in the category Media/Journalist of the Year was received by the Internet TV TUT.BY. The statuette and diploma were given to the TUT.BY TV editor Alena Andrejeva.
- The prize in the nomination Best NGO Website of the Year was awarded to the Viasna Human Rights Centre.
- The prize in the nomination Civil Leader of the Year was awarded to Siarhei Mikhalok (music band "Liapis Trubiackoj"). The prize was received by the band's press secretary, Dzmitry Bezkaravajny.

=== 2014 ===
On 13 January 2014, the sixth "Civil Society Champions" award ceremony took place in Minsk. The Assembly of NGOs marked the most notable and important events and activities that occurred in the Belarusian civil sector in the year. The jury consisted of 100 individuals, including civil activists, former award winners and journalists.

- Civil Leaders of the Year was awarded to language teachers from the popular Belarusian language courses "Mova Nanova", "Mova ci Kava", "Movavieda" and "Mova TUT".
- Campaign of the Year — "Show You Are a Belarusian". Art-Siadziba members held a number of actions aimed at the promotion of Belarusian symbols, including the Embroidered T-shirt Day and distribution of embroidered ribbons of the total length of 5 kilometers in the center of the city.
- New Initiative — Experts in the protection of Kurapaty (an open-air memorial of the Stalin repressions victims). Archeologists, architects, engineers, lawyers, historians, and journalists united to protect Kurapaty from illegal redevelopment.
- Regional Event — 1863 Rebels Remembrance Day in Svislac. It was the 20th anniversary of the Remembrance Day celebration.
- Creative Input of the Year — spontaneous solidarity action held by football fans at the Belarus-Ukraine football game in October 2014.
- Media/Journalist of the Year — Marat Haravy, Novy Chas journalist.
- Best NGO website of the Year — Informational website for teachers and trainers www.nastaunik.info.
- Screw Up of the Year — Citizenship and Migration Department of the Directorate of Internal Affairs of Minsk City Executive Committee and Citizenship and Migration Department of the Piersamajski Regional Directorate of Internal Affairs of Minsk for deprivation of citizenship and deportation of the human rights defender Alena Tankacova.

=== 2015 ===
On 15 January the Assembly arranged the 7th "Civil Society Champions" Award Ceremony to estimate leaders and the most significant events of the last year in the third sector.

- An award The Civil Leader of the Year was given to Sviatlana Alexievich. The fact that she won a prestigious international award united Belarusians and her civic stand made Belarusians think about the situation in the country.
- The Campaign of the Year was a solidarity campaign with the cadets of the Jastrambelskaja school (#Пагоняпобач – Pahonia is near). The award was given to the initiators of the campaign — representatives of the "Art Siadziba".
- The award in the New Initiative nomination was given to the students of the theatre laboratory Fortinbras at the Belarusan Free Theatre for a series of performances in support of the disabled people.
- Regional Event — the protection of the lake Balduk bank from the construction in the Pastavy region was named as. Members of the organizations Green Network, EcoDom, APB-Birdlife Belarus, and locals are fighting against construction near the lake starting from 2012.
- The award in the Partnership of the Year nomination was given to the humanitarian route initiative "Belarus-ATO". The nomination was introduced at the first time this year and was given for the solitary activities and best initiative realization that united partners from the different sectors and spheres for the civil society benefits.
- As the best NGO website of the year was chosen a portal adukacyja.info.
- The Screw Up of the Year an "anti-award" marked the Ministry of Information for an order to wipe out the edition of the Vital Silicki's book "Long road to tyranny: the post-communist authoritarianism and the struggle for democracy in Serbia and Belarus".
- In the Creative Input of the Year nomination chose went to the Street Art Fest Urban Myths in Minsk.
- For versatile and thorough coverage of civic activity the award in the Media/Journalist of the Year nomination took a blogger Anton Matolka.

=== 2016 ===
On 23 December, Minsk hosted the eighth Civil Society Champions award ceremony. Assembly of Pro-Democratic NGOs marked the most outstanding and interesting events in the public sector for the current year.

- An award The Civil Leader of the Year was given to Zmicier Daskievic, who in 2016 initiated a collection of signatures for giving the Belarusan national white-red-white flag the status of historical value, destroyed 3.5 m of topsoil on the Belarusan-Russian border, and protested against opening the "Minsk-Moscow" graffiti and the establishment of a monument to Lenin.
- The award in the New Initiative nomination was given to the "Human Constanta" agency that had launched public actions in defense of the refugees' and migrants' rights in Brest.
- The jury consisting of 116 people this year, gave the prize In the Creative Input of the Year nomination to an unknown artist who painted barbed wire in the middle of the scandalous "Minsk-Moscow" graffiti.
- The campaign on the protection of Asmalouka, the historical and cultural district of Minsk, was called Regional Event this year.
- The award in the Partnership of the Year nomination was given to the Talaka.by platform. This nonprofit site is aimed at active people who want to find teams and financing to implement their ideas. Projects on the development of the Belarusan language and culture receive great support on the platform.
- The award in the Media Activity nomination was received by the "Imena" ("Names") online magazine which publishes stories of different Belarusans, as well as gives its readers an opportunity to support important social projects.
- The Screw Up of the Year "anti-award" was given to the Minsk City Executive Committee staff who roughly detained members of a peaceful action of cyclists "Critical mass".
- The prize in the category Media/Journalist of the Year was awarded to the author of 98 materials on civil society in 2016, Halina Abakuncyk from Radio Liberty (RFE/RL), for the most thorough and versatile lighting of relevant activities in the non-governmental sector.
- The campaign on collecting signatures for giving the national Belarusan white-red-white flag the status of historical and cultural value was recognized the Campaign of the Year, #nashstsyag.

=== 2017 ===
On 21 December, Assembly of Pro-Democratic NGOs held the ninth Civil Society Champions award ceremony to praise outstanding persons and mark the most interesting events that took place in the Belarusian civil society sector in 2017.

- The winner in the Civil Leader of the Year nomination became Siarhei Drazdoŭski, the coordinator of the Office for the Rights of People with Disabilities and the initiator of the campaign "Agenda 50". The campaign was launched in five Belarusian towns and was aimed at promoting and implementing provisions of the Convention on the Rights of Persons with Disabilities.
- The jury chose two winners in the New initiative nomination: public movement "Dzieja" for its initiatives to erect a monument to the Slutsk rebels, solving local problems in Vileyka, the initiative Legalize Belarus and translating the Civil Code into Belarusian. Also, the "Chajsy" initiative (Viciebsk) was awarded, an initiative to investigate Stalinist repressions and to honor the memory of the victims.
- The prize in the Creative Input of the Year nomination went to the Young Front activists and writers' community who had organized an event called "The night of murdered poets".
- The Marches of non-slackers against the Decree No 3 that were held in several Belarusian cities in 2017 received the prize in the Regional Event nomination this year. Many Belarusian citizens and civil activists participated in the Marches.
- The award in the Partnership of the Year nomination was received by the Belarusian weekends project for implementation of the best initiative bringing together partners from different fields and sectors. Within the Belarusian weekends project, movies dubbed in Belarusian were screened in several cinemas of the country in 2017.
- The prize in the Media Activity nomination was awarded to the social networks of the search and rescue team "Angel".
- The Screw Up of the Year "anti-award" is given to governmental agencies/officials who perform negative actions against civil society organizations or their representatives. For 2017, the jury decided to give this anti-award for the institution of criminal proceedings for alleged preparation of mass riots. Over 30 former activists of the organization "Bely Lehijon" and patriotic sports club "Patriot" were detained within this criminal case.
- The prize in the Media/Journalist of the Year nomination was awarded to the video blogger Maksim Filipovič from Homiel. His YouTube channel became so popular that Belarusian authorities accused him in substituting the official State media.
- The Campaign in defense of Kurapaty was named the Campaign of the Year.

=== 2018 ===
On 10 January 2018, at the "Korpus" cultural space in Minsk Assembly of Pro-Democratic NGOs held the 10th Civil Society Champions award ceremony to praise outstanding activists and mark the most interesting civil society events of 2018.The short list contained 57 nominees and the jury united 112 civil society leaders, experts and journalists from all over Belarus.

- The winner in the Civil Leader of the Year nomination became Pavel Belavus, founder of "Art Siadziba." In 2018, he was one of the organizers of celebration of the 100th anniversary of the Belarusan People's Republic, having launched a concert and information campaign #BNR100, as well as initiated civil actions #dobryjaslovy and "Stone paved memory" in Kurapaty.
- Celebration of the 100th anniversary of the Belarusian People's Republic was named the Campaign of the Year. It was a national public campaign that united many people, non-commercial and commercial organizations, as well as governmental bodies in dozens of Belarusian cities.
- The prize in the New initiative nomination went to the Nil Hilievič University that was registered as an educational institution in March 2018. It was founded by the Belarusian Language Society with the aim to provide young Belarusians with an opportunity to receive higher education in Belarusian (currently teaching in all higher education facilities is organized in the Russian language).
- The award in the nomination Media Activity was given to Vincuk Viačorka for his original series of short videos in social networks "Language About Language" aimed at popularizing Belarusian language.
- The award in the Talaka (Cooperation) of the Year nomination was received by the "Talaka" crowdfunding platform that managed to collect 1 million BLR for civil society projects.
- The prize in the Regional Event nomination went to the campaign against the construction of a battery plant in Bierascie.
- The award in the Partnership of the Year nomination was received by the Belarusian human rights NGOs for preparing the report for the UN Human Rights Committee. As a result of human rights defenders' cooperation, their recommendations became part of over 60 UN Human Rights Committee's recommendations on improvement of the situation with human rights in Belarus.
- The winner of the Creative Input of the Year nomination became "Dzietki-Kvietki" initiative founded by a group of parents who monitored situation with Belarusian language in 106 kindergartens of Minsk.
- The prize in the Media/Journalist of the Year nomination was awarded to Tacciana Karavenkova who professionally highlights social and political issues in Belarus on BelaPAN.
- The Screw Up of the Year "anti-award" went to BelTA that filed a lawsuit against 14 journalists working in independent media and accused them of unauthorized access to BelTa information.

=== 2019 ===
An award ceremony for winners of "Champions of Civil Society-2019" event took place in Minsk club "Brugge" on January, 9. Assembly of NGOs has noted personas and important events of civil sector for the eleventh time. This time the jury consisted of a record number of civic leaders, experts, journalists and winners of previous events – for a total of 150 people.

The most fierce competition unfolded in the category Community Leader / Public Leader of the Year. The first place was shared by Svetlana Gatalskaya of the "March, baby!", movement which promotes the adoption of the law on combating domestic violence, and Elena Maslyukova, leader of the initiative against the plant for the production of bleached cellulose in Svetlogorsk.

- Campaign of the Year title was won by the Campaign for Memory of the Rebels of 1863–1864, in Vilnius.
- New Initiative – educational platform "Territory of Rights" founded jointly by Belarusian Human Rights House and Viasna Human Rights Centre.
- In Media activity nomination a YouTube video blog "Rudabel Window Dressing" won.
- Hedgehog statue – the Talaka of the Year nomination award, that is given for successful involvement of people in civil society activities, was received by the Crowdfounding Platform MolaMola.
- Regional Event award was won by the "Inclusive Barista" project, which spread its activities to regional and small towns.
- Partnership of the Year – opening a memorial for Ales Adamovich in Glush. Civil society has initiated, and gathered, the funds. The project was prepared by the sculptor Genik Loika, was supported by the writer's daughter Natalla Adamovic, and the local authorities had provided a proper place for the memorial and helped with the grand opening.
- Citizens of Brest won the nomination Creativity of the Year with their reBrest smartphone app – guide for city architectural heritage. Viktor Klimus, project leader, received the statuette.
- Reporter of the Year – Dziana Seradziuk. Dziana leads the "Citizenship" section of "Novy Chas", which reports in a systematic manner on important social situations and events, including those around Kurapaty and Military Graves, that mobilize civil society, as well as language issues, and other things.
- Anti-award "Pumpkin" of the year – justification of removal of memorial crosses in Kurapaty and persecution of memorial defenders.
