= Alana Gebremariam =

Belarusian pro-democracy activist and feminist

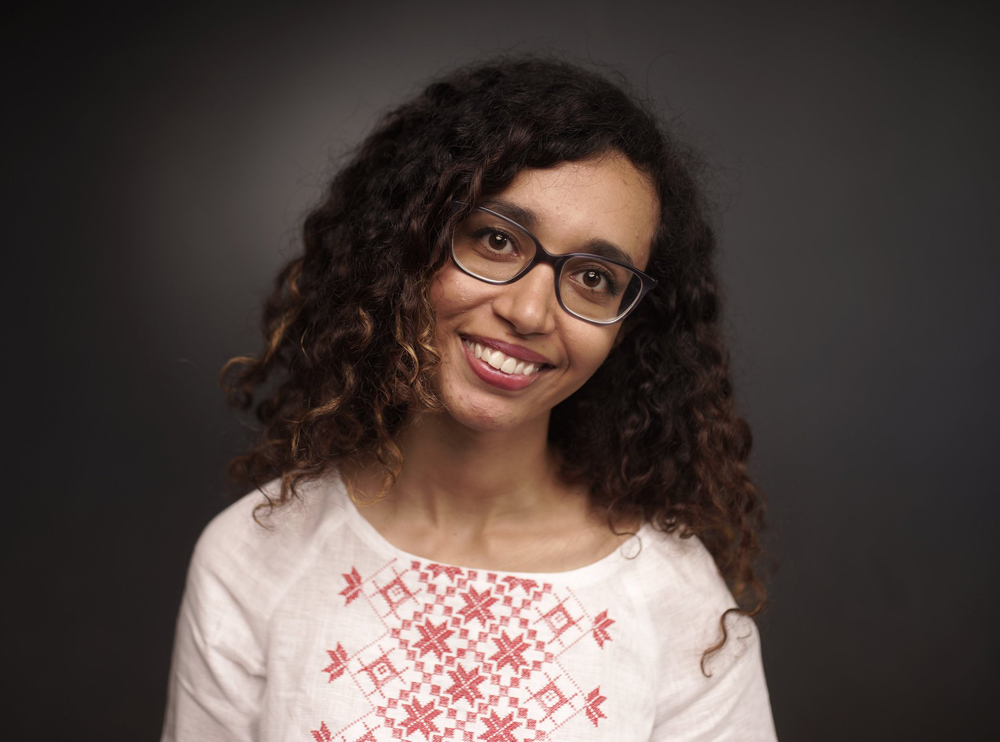
Alana Gebremariam in 2020.

Alana Tadege Gebremariam (Belarusian Алана Таде́ге Гебрэмарыям, Russian Алана Таде́ге Гебремариам; born March 7, 1997) is a Belarusian pro-democracy activist and feminist. She was the first woman of African ancestry to run in the 2019 general election.

== Biography ==
Born and raised in Minsk, Gebremariam graduated with honors from the physics and mathematics class of gymnasium No. 61 in Minsk. She graduated from Belarusian State Medical University with a degree in dentistry, during her studies she was engaged in scientific activities.

In 2018, she became a leader of the Belarusian Students' Association, promoting political activism among college students and young working professionals.

In 2019, she was nominated as a candidate for the 2019 parliamentary elections in the Hrushevsky District in Minsk, from the Belarusian Social Democratic Assembly and the Youth Bloc.

== Political Persecution ==
Following the disputed 2020 Belarusian presidential election, she became a key member of the Coordinating Council to stabilize the situation in the country and ensure the transfer of power. In October, former presidential candidate Sviatlana Tsikhanouskaya appointed Gebremariam as her representative for youth and student affairs.

On November 12, 2020, the apartments of Gebremariam and a number of other activists of the Belarusian Union of Students were searched, and the activists detained and taken to the KGB. On November 13, it became known that Alana was in the KGB pre-trial detention center on a criminal case on organizing actions grossly violating public order (part 1 of article 342 of the Criminal Code of the Republic of Belarus).

In a joint statement of fifteen organizations, including the Viasna Human Rights Centre, the Belarusian Association of Journalists, the Belarusian Helsinki Committee, the Belarusian PEN Center, dated November 18, 2020, Gebremariam was recognized as a political prisoner. On December 7, 2020, MEP Katarina Barley took over the patronage of the political prisoner.

On March 16, 2021, the first charges were filed by the Investigative Committee against Gebremariam and other participants in the “case of the students” and university teachers.

On July 16, 2021, the Sovietsky District Court of the city of Minsk sentenced by Marina Fedorova, already blacklisted by the European Union on December 17, 2020, for numerous politically motivated sentences, as well as prosecutors: Anastasia Maliko, Roman Chabatarov and, together with other participants in the case, to 2 years and 6 months in prison. Gebremariam served her sentence at penal colony no. 4 in Gomel alongside fellow student activists, including Ksenia Syramalot and Yana Arabeika.

On November 30, 2022, Gebremariam was released from jail.
