= Justice for Peace at Donbas =

Coalition "Justice for Peace in Donbas" (Ukrainian: Справедливість заради миру на Донбасі) is an informal alliance of 17 Ukrainian human rights organisations and initiatives. Members of the Coalition have teamed up to document human rights violations that occurred during the armed conflict in eastern Ukraine.

The Coalition focuses on gathering information about the most serious human rights violations and violations of international humanitarian law in the context of the armed conflict in Donbas. The member organisations of the Coalition maintain and develop common Database which contains information on human rights violations. Thus, the documentation of violations becomes more efficient.

== Coalition members ==
Most members of the Coalition are representatives of the Luhansk and Donetsk regions

Organisations that are part of the Coalition are:

- Alchevsk Human Rights Analytical Center,
- Public Committee for Protection of Constitutional Rights and Freedoms of Citizens,
- Public organization "Mirny bereg"
- Public Movement "Ochyschennya"
- Donbas SOS
- Donetsk Memorial
- Ecological and Cultural Center "Bakhmat"
- Luhansk Regional Human Rights Center "Alternative"
- Human Rights Center "Postup" / Vostok SOS
- Starobilsk NGO "Volia"
- Starobilsk public organization "Volya"
- Eastern-Ukraininan Center for Civic Initiatives
- Ukrainian Helsinki Human Rights Union
- Kharkiv Human Rights Protection Group
- Center for Civil Liberties / Euromaidan SOS
- "Social Action" Centre NGO
- Ivano-Frankivsk regional organisation "Moloda Prosvita"

Coalition partners are the UN Development Program in Ukraine and the International Renaissance Foundation.

== History ==
The alliance was founded in 2014. One of the first joint initiatives of members of the Coalition was a project supported by the Helsinki Foundation for Human Rights (Warsaw), in which member organisations collected evidence of more than 150 people who had been in illegal places of detention under the control of "DNR" and "LNR".

== Activities ==
In 2015, the Coalition published a report based on interviews with people who were held in prisons during a military confrontation in the Donetsk and Luhansk regions, "Surviving Hell: The testimony of victims on illegal detention in Donbas".

At the moment, organisations of the Coalition continue to document cases of detention of people in illegal detention facilities on the territories controlled by the Donetsk People's Republic and the Luhansk People's Republic, as well as by Ukrainian volunteer battalions and Armed Forces of Ukraine. The Coalition also studies the cases of military use of children and cases of gender-based violence.
