= Assembly of Pro-Democratic NGOs =

- Formation: 1997 Minsk, Belarus
- Type: Non-governmental organization
- Headquarters: Minsk, Belarus
- Region served: Belarus
- Members: 300+
- Website: www.belngo.info

Assembly of Pro-Democratic NGOs of Belarus (Assembly of NGOs) (Belarusian: Асамблея няўрадавых дэмакратычных арганізацыяў Беларусі (Асамблея НДА), romanized: Asambleya nyawpadavykh dyemakratychnykh arhanizatsyyaw Belarusi (Asambleya NDA)) is an association of non-governmental organizations and civil initiatives in Belarus that declare their commitment to promote principles of an independent, democratic and law-governed state. The Assembly of NGOs counts more than 300 member organizations and civil initiatives. It actively participates in the Eastern Partnership Civil Society Forum (EaP CSF), including its National Platform for Belarus. Since 2013, it has hosted annually the Civil Society Champions award ceremony to honor those prominent people or events in the civil sector.
