= Ukrainian Helsinki Human Rights Union =

Human rights organization

Ukrainian Helsinki Human Rights Union (UHHRU)
- Founded: April 2004
- Purpose: Protecting human rights
- Location: Kyiv, Ukraine
- Region served: Ukraine
- Key people: Yevgen Zakharov and Volodymyr Yavorskyy
- Website: helsinki.org.ua

All-Ukrainian Association of Public Organizations Ukrainian Helsinki Human Rights Union (UHHRU) was founded by 15 public human rights organizations on 1 April 2004. UHHRU is a non-profit and non-partisan organization.

== Statutory mission ==
Realization and protection of rights and freedoms by promoting practical implementation of humanitarian articles of the Helsinki Final Act (Organization for Security and Co-operation in Europe) adopted in 1975, other international laws based on it and all other obligations accepted by Ukraine in human rights and freedoms sphere.

== Supervisory Board of the Union ==
On the Supervisory Board are prominent members of the Ukrainian Helsinki group of 1960-80s:

- Zynoviy Antonyuk
- Mykola Horbal
- Vasyl Lisovyi
- Vasyl Ovsiyenko
- Yevgen Pronyuk
- Yevgen Sverstyuk
- Yosyf Zisels

== Members ==
- All-Ukrainian Society of Political Prisoners and Victims of Repression
- Association “Civic Initiative” (Kirovohrad)
- Center for Legal and Political Research “SIM” (Lviv)
- Center for Research into Regional Policy (Sumy)
- Chernigiv Committee for the Protection of Citizens's Constitutional Rights
- Civic Committee for the Protection of Constitutional Rights and Civil Liberties (Luhansk)
- Civic Organization M’ART (Youth Alternative) (Chernigiv)
- Congress of National Communities of Ukraine
- Institute of Socio-Economic Issues “Respublica” (Kyiv)
- Kharkiv Human Rights Protection Group
- Kherson Regional Organization of the Committee of Voters of Ukraine
- Konotop Society of Consumers and Taxpayers “Dignity” (Sumy Region)
- Kryvy Rih City Association of the All-Ukrainian Taras Shevchenko Society “Prosvita” (Enlightenment)
- Luhansk Regional Branch of the Committee of Voters of Ukraine
- Odesa Human Rights Group “Veritas”
- Sevastopol Human Rights Protection Group
- Sumy City Association Civic Office "Pravozakhyst" (Human rights protection)

== Alliances ==
Ukrainian Helsinki Human Rights Union is a member of the Coalition "Justice for Peace in Donbas".

== Major activities ==
- Constant monitoring of human rights and fundamental freedoms in Ukraine
- Protection of human rights and fundamental freedoms in courts and state bodies
- Conducting researches in human rights field, also drafting the laws and by-laws
- Conducting educational seminars, trainings and conferences
- Promoting human rights organizations network in Ukraine

== Recent projects ==
- Developing a network of human rights lawyers through training and carrying out strategic litigation (December 2006 – December 2007)
- Influencing the program activities of political parties through a monitoring of law-drafting activities and analysis of political parties’ pre-election programs as to their coverage of human rights issues (February 2006 – March 2007)
- Developing a network of human rights organizations in order to increase their influence on the authorities and society with the aim of active protection of human rights (October 2004 – December 2005)

== Annual reports "Human rights in Ukraine" ==
Since 2005, UHHRU in cooperation with the Kharkiv Human Rights Protection Group and other human rights organizations publishes a yearbook Human Rights in Ukraine: Report by Human Rights Organisations (in Ukrainian and English). These reports analyze the observation of fundamental rights; social, economic and cultural rights; human rights in "closed" communities; collective and environmental rights and offer recommendations for corrective actions in each area of human rights. To date, two yearbooks (2004 and 2006) have been published. Their English versions are freely accessible from UHHRU's web-site.

== See also ==
- Ukrainian Helsinki Group
