= Association of Ukrainian Monitors on Human Rights Conduct in Law Enforcement =

Ukrainian human rights organization

Association of Ukrainian Human Rights Monitors on Law Enforcement
Established	June 2010
Web-page	umdpl.info

The Association of Ukrainian Human Rights Monitors on Law Enforcement (Association UMDPL) is a Ukrainian human rights organization that oversees nationwide monitoring of Ukrainian law enforcement conduct, utilizing its resources to ensure the active preservation of human rights and fundamental freedoms in the Central European country.

== History ==
From 2005–2010, with the direct engagement of Ukrainian non-governmental organizations (NGO), the Ministry of Internal Affairs of Ukraine (MIA) introduced three institutions to maintain public control over police activities and police compliance with human rights standards. These were: mobile groups for monitoring arrests, as a prototype of the national preventive mechanisms (since 2004); Public Council for Human Rights at the Ministry and its regional headquarters (since 2005); Human Rights Monitoring Department (HRMD) (since 2008). HRMD was the unique unit for Ukraine and acted during 2008–2010 as the Office of Police Ombudsman.

The activities of these institutions were based on internal MIA regulations and despite the resistance from the “old-guard” police chiefs provided transparency for police activities.

With the change of the Ukrainian government in March 2010, the attitude of the Ministry of Interior regarding human rights changed significantly. One of the first decisions of the new Minister was to eliminate the Human Rights Monitoring Department. Its employees were fired at short notice, despite the labor law's requirements.

Under these circumstances, NGO activists and former HRMD’s employees decided to form a specialized sector of public control over law enforcement agencies, which provided a newly established nationwide NGO, the “Association of Ukrainian Monitors on Human Rights Conduct in Law Enforcement.” This Association was founded in June 2010 by 29 former employees of the Human Rights Monitoring Department at the Ministry of Interior.

== Human resources ==
Today, the association has branches in 16 regions and works with more than 60 volunteers in 21 regions. Ten members of the association have long-term work experience in such NGOs as Ukrainian Helsinki Human Rights Union, Kharkov Human Rights Protection Group, Committee of Voters of Ukraine, Civilian Network “OPORA.” Nineteen members are former high-ranked police officers who have more than 20 years of working experience in patrol police, internal investigation units, personnel and analytical units, organized crime units, police universities, etc. The Association is registered by the Ministry of Justice.

Association experts were coauthors of such significant policy documents as a draft of the law “On the National Committee on Prevention of Torture”, “National plan on combating xenophobia, racial and ethnic discrimination in Ukrainian society for the period of 2010–2012”, “Program for Gender Equality establishment in Ukrainian police for the period up to 2011”; developed and published seven manuals on human rights issues in law enforcement; and participated in implementation of international projects, such as:

1. “Sustainable development of national preventive mechanisms against torture and ill-treatment in Ukraine” (supported by Organization for Security and Co-operation in Europe (OSCE)), 2010;
2. “Creation of systematic public control over the Ministry of Interior’s activities in the field of Human Rights observance” (supported by International Renaissance Foundation), 2010;
3. “Eliminating Racial and Ethnic Discrimination in Ukrainian police Investigation Documents” (supported by British Council and IOM), 2010;
4. "Campaigning against torture and cruel treatment in Ukraine" (Kharkiv Human Rights Protection Group with the support of European Commission), 2009–2010
5. “Implementation the National Preventive Mechanisms according to OPCAT in the law-enforcement activities” (Kharkiv Human Rights Protection Group with the support of European Commission), 2009.
6. “Introducing a National Preventive Mechanism in the Ministry of Interior of Ukraine against Cruelty and torture” (OSCE), 2007 – 2009.
7. “Human Rights and Militia: European dimension” (OSCE), 2007 – 2008.
8. “The implementation of the monitoring inspection for Ministry of Interior’s custody facilities” (OSCE), 2006.
9. "Campaigning against torture and cruel treatment in Ukraine" (Kharkiv Human Rights Protection Group with the support of European Commission), 2003–2005.

== Research experience ==
- 2011–2012 – the project of Kharkiv Human Rights Group “Monitoring Hate Crimes in Ukraine, Defence of Victims, and Analysis of the Ukrainian Legislation and Practice regarding Prevention from Hate Crime” at the support of EVZ
- 2011–2012 – the project of Association of Ukrainian monitors on Human Rights conduct in Law Enforcement (Association UMDPL) «Strengthen of civil control sector over police» at the support of NED
- 2011 – the project of international NGO “International Helsinki Association for human rights” “Creation of mechanisms of civil expertise and civil investigations of human rights violations from the side of the MIA and criminal-executive system” at the support of International Renaissance Foundation
- 2011 – the project of Association of Ukrainian monitors on Human Rights conduct in Law Enforcement (Association UMDPL) “Strengthen of civil control over police”, at the support of German Embassy in Ukraine
- 2010 – The OSCE project “Sustainable development of national preventive mechanisms against torture and ill-treatment in Ukraine”
- 2010 – the project of Kharkiv Human Rights Group “Creation of systematic civil control on Human Rights observation in the Ministry of Interior’s activity” at the support International Renaissance Foundation
- 2010 – British Council, IOM, MIA, KISR “Eliminating Racial and Ethnic Discrimination from Ukrainian police Investigation Documents”
- 2009–2010 – The project "Campaigning against torture and cruel treatment in Ukraine" at the support of European Commission.

== Structure ==
The highest body of the Association is the annual General Meeting. It approves the financial and content-based reports, elects members and Head of the Board, the Audit and Supervisory boards. The Annual general meeting also discusses issues pertaining to the strategy and development of the organization.

== Partners ==
- Kharkiv Human Rights Protection Group
- Helsinki Human Rights Union
- Kharkiv Institute of Social Researches
- International Women’s Right Centre – La Strada Ukraine
- Civilian network “OPORA”
- All Ukrainian Educational Program “The Understanding Human Rights”
