= Kharkiv Human Rights Protection Group =

Ukrainian human rights organization

- Founded: November 1992
- Location: Kharkiv, Ukraine
- Region served: Ukraine
- Key people: Yevgen Zakharov and Irina Rapp
- Website: khpg.org

The Kharkiv Human Rights Protection Group (KhPG) is one of the oldest and most active Ukrainian human rights organizations. As a legal entity, it was established in 1992, but it has been working as a human rights protection group in the Ukrainian SSR since 1988 under the Society "Memorial". It was the first official human rights organization in the former USSR. Many members of the organization took part in a human rights movement of the 1960s – 1980s.

== Statutory mission ==
- gathering information about human rights abuse and sending this information to the relevant persons, organizations, and mass media
- carrying out public investigations of human rights violations
- legal enlightenment and popularization of law-protecting ideas
- examination of the operating laws and draft bills as to their compliance with international legal rules
- appealing to legislative, executive and judicial offices for problems concerning human rights
- initiating and supporting public protests, actions and conferences on problems of human rights

== Major activities ==
- defense of persons whose rights are violated by legislative powers or public officials (since 1988)
- creation and support of an information network for human rights organizations (since 1992)
- preparation and publication of a series of history books dedicated to resistance to the totalitarian regime in the USSR (since 1992)
- human rights propaganda, among executive and legislative authorities, local governments, NGOs, and concerned citizens (since 1993)
- human rights education for various social and professional groups (since 1993)
- creation and management of a public reception center and library with free and easy access for all citizens (since 1995)
- analysis of the human rights situation in Ukraine (since 1995)
- annual All-Ukrainian human rights essay contests for college and high school students (since 1996)
- monitoring and protection of freedom of expression and privacy (since 1996)
- monitoring and protection of the right to freedom from torture, cruel, and unusual punishment (since 1996)
- analysis of the legislation and legislative practices concerning the special services (since 1996)
- investigating a history of the dissident movement in Ukraine, creating a biographical dictionary of dissidents and a list of persons repressed on political grounds between 1953 and 1988 (since 1996)
- creation and support of the information resource «Human Rights in Ukraine» (www.khpg.org) (since 2000)
- analysis of discrimination and inequality in Ukraine (since 2002)

== Recent projects ==
- Creation of Virtual Human Rights Library in Ukraine (December 2006 - June 2007)
- Creation of a National System for the Prevention of Torture and Ill-Treatment in Ukraine (November 2006 – January 2008)
- Monitoring, Defense and Preparation of the Regional Report on Human Rights and the National Report on Human Rights "Human Rights in Ukraine – 2006" (July 2006 – June 2007)
- Analysis of the problem of overcrowding in facilities of preliminary detention (January 2006 – February 2007)
- Monitoring, Defense and Preparation of the Regional Report on Human Rights and the National Report on Human Rights "Human Rights in Ukraine – 2005" (July 2005 – June 2006)
- Legal and public monitoring of the presidential election campaign in the East and South of Ukraine and defense of voters' rights during the third stage of the election (December 2004 – May 2005)
- Monitoring, Defense and Preparation of the Regional Report on Human Rights and the National Report on Human Rights "Human Rights in Ukraine – 2004" (June 2004 – April 2005)
- Fostering human rights (February 2005 – January 2008)
- Creating mechanisms of cooperation of human rights organizations, Ukraine (August 2003 – July 2004)
- Campaigning against torture and cruel treatment in Ukraine (July 2003 – July 2006)

== Major publications in English ==
- Access to information and other aspects of freedom of expression and privacy in Ukraine
- The Presidential elections – 2004 in Ukraine: A Human Rights perspective
- Against torture: Review of messages on torture and cruel treatment in Ukraine (June 2001 – December 2002)
- On torture and cruel treatment in Ukraine (1997–2001)

== International and foreign partners ==
- Amnesty International
- Human Rights Watch
- Association for the Prevention of Torture (APT)
- UN Committee against Torture
- European Committee on the Prevention of Torture and Cruel Treatment (CPT)
- Moscow Helsinki Group
- International Society "Memorial"
- Russian Institute on Human Rights

== Alliances ==
The Kharkiv Human Rights Protection Group was a member of the Coalition "Justice for Peace in Donbas".

Today it is one of the trustees of the Tribunal for Putin coalition, which has recorded over 56,000 war crimes committed on Ukrainian territory since 24 February 2022 by Russia's armed forces. In 2025, KhPG was designated as an 'undesirable organization' in Russia.

== Awards ==
EU/US Democracy and Civil Society Award (1998)

== See also ==
Association of Ukrainian Monitors on Human Rights Conduct in Law Enforcement
