= All-Belarusian Unity and Accord Party =

Former political party in Belarus

The All-Belarusian Unity and Accord Party (Belarusian: Партыя ўсебеларускага адзінства і згоды, Partiia vsebelorusskogo edinstva i soglasiia, PVES) was a social democratic political party in Belarus. It was led by Dmitry Petrovich Bulakhov.

== History ==
The party contested the 1995 parliamentary elections. After the first round, the party formed an alliance for the upcoming rounds with the Belarusian Labour Party, Belarusian Women's Party "Nadzieja", People's Accord Party, Belarusian Social Democratic Assembly and the Common Sense Party called "Social Democratic Union", winning two seats in the fourth round of voting. When the National Assembly was established in 1996, the party was given one seat in the House of Representatives. However, it was closed down by the Supreme Court in 1998.
