= Belarusian Patriotic Party =

Former political party in Belarus

Belarusian Patriotic Party Белорусская патриотическая партия Беларуская патрыятычная партыя
- Abbreviation: BPP (English); БПП (Russian)
- Chairman: Nikolai Ulakhovich
- Founder: Anatoly Barankevich
- Founded: 1994; 32 years ago
- Banned: 24 July 2023; 2 years ago
- Headquarters: 38th Building, Myasnikova St, Minsk
- Membership (2000): ~1,000
- Ideology: Socialism; Pro-Lukashenko; Socialist patriotism
- Political position: Left-wing
- National affiliation: RKSKPPGA
- Colors: Red; Blue

Website
- ulahovich.by/partiya

The Belarusian Patriotic Party (Belarusian: Беларуская патрыятычная партыя, romanized: Bielaruskaja patryjatyčnaja partyja, BPP) was a political party in Belarus loyal to President Alexander Lukashenko. Nikolai Ulakhovich was the party's chairman.

== History ==
The party was established in 1994, and was initially named the Belarusian Patriotic Movement. The party was originally formed under presidential candidate Alexander Lukashenko. Major General, Honored Pilot of the Soviet Union, Deputy Chairman of the Union of Officers of Belarus Anatoly Barankevich became the leader of the party.

BPM won one seat in the second round of voting in the 1995 parliamentary elections. It changed its name to the Belarusian Patriotic Party in 1996.

On August 19, 2000, at a congress, the BPP nominated 16 candidates for the parliamentary elections

When checking the Telegraph correspondent of the offices of parties registered in Belarus, it turned out that the BPP has not been at its address since at least 2009, which does not correspond to the information posted on the official website of the Ministry of Justice of Belarus.

The party nominated Nikolai Ulakhovich as its candidate for the 2015 presidential elections. Ulakhovich finished fourth in a field of four candidates with 1.7% of the vote.

On 18 February 2018, following the results of the elections to the Minsk City Council of Deputies, one of the candidates from the Belarusian Patriotic Party was able to be elected to the local Council of Deputies.

In the summer of 2020, the BPP called on voters to support the candidacy of Alexander Lukashenko in the upcoming presidential elections.

The Belarusian Patriotic Party was allied with the Communist Party of Belarus and the Liberal Democratic Party of Belarus. It cooperates with the Belarusian Exarchate of the Russian Orthodox Church and former military organizations.

The party was liquidated by the Supreme Court of Belarus on 24 July 2023, following a complaint from the Ministry of Justice.

== Ideology and goals ==
The party was considered left-wing and socialist. It officially supported president Lukashenko. The unique trait of the party was its combination of Belarusian patriotism with socialism - as such, the party consisted of left-nationalist activists.

The official goals of the party were described as following: "assistance in building a socially just society; assistance to the formation of a renewed union of fraternal peoples and, first of all, Russia, Belarus, Ukraine; supporting the president in his efforts to implement the preeminent program and urgent measures to bring Belarus out of the crisis; protection of national interests, honor and dignity of the Fatherland in all spheres." Among the program points of the BPP was even the abolition of the Belovezha Accords.

The Belarusian Patriotic Party condemned NATO and the United States for the bombing of Yugoslavia in 1999 and called it and its 'satellites' to "primary accountability". It argued that in face of American imperialism, all radio and television stations in Belarus should cease any English-language broadcasts, including English-language music.

Despite stating its commitment to Belarusian patriotism, the party was also considered a formally pro-Russian political structure. The declaration of the party stated that one of its goals was "working toward the reestablishment of an upgraded union of brotherly people, of Russia, Belarus and Ukraine in the first place."

== BPP Council ==
1. Nikolai Dmitrievich Ulakhovich (born 1951/08/21) - Chairman of the Board of the BPP
2. Sergey Alexandrovich Poletaev (born 1975/11/14) - Deputy Chairman of the Board of the BPP
3. Leokadiya Dmitrovna Romeyko (born 1959/01/30) - Deputy Chairman of the Board of the BPP
4. Grigory Grigorievich Motuzo (born 1962/05/20) - head of the Brest organization
5. Viktor Nikolaevich Nikolaev (born 1965/05/06) - head of the Vitebsk organization
6. Sergey Grigorievich Lemeshevsky (born 1970/09/20) - head of the Mogilev organization
7. Ilya Nikolaevich Ulakhovich (born 1980/12/02) - Head of the Legal Department
8. Vitaly Aleksandrovich Romeyko (born 1986/10/22) - head of the Kastrychnitski District organization of Minsk

== Election results ==
=== Presidential elections ===
Election	Candidate	First round		Second round		Result
Election	Candidate	Votes	%	Votes	%	Result
1994	Endorsed Alexander Lukashenko	2,646,140	44.82%	4,241,026	80.34%	Elected ✓
2001	Endorsed Alexander Lukashenko	4,666,680	75.65%			Elected ✓
2006	Endorsed Alexander Lukashenko	5,501,249	82.97%			Elected ✓
2010	Endorsed Alexander Lukashenko	5,130,557	79.65%			Elected ✓
2015	Nikolai Ulakhovich	102,131	1.67%			Lost ✗
2020	Endorsed Alexander Lukashenko	4,661,075	80.10%			Elected ✓

=== Legislative elections ===
Election	Leader	Performance					Rank	Government
Election	Leader	Votes	%	+/–	Seats	+/–	Rank	Government
1995	Anatoly Barankevich				1 / 260	New	14th	Support
2000	Anatoly Barankevich				0 / 110	▼1	▲10th	Extra-parliamentary
2004	Nikolai Ulakhovich	Did not contest						Extra-parliamentary
2008	Nikolai Ulakhovich	Did not contest						Extra-parliamentary
2012	Nikolai Ulakhovich	Did not contest						Extra-parliamentary
2016	Nikolai Ulakhovich	111,045	2.16%	New	3 / 110	▲3	▲5th	Support
2019	Nikolai Ulakhovich	75,283	1.43%	▼0.73	2 / 110	▼1	▼7th	Support
2024	Banned							
