= United Civic Party =

Belarusian political party

United Civic Party Аб'яднаная грамадзянская партыя Объединённая гражданская партия
- Abbreviation: UCP (English); АГП (Belarusian); ОГП (Russian)
- Leader: Mikalaj Kazloŭ
- Founder: Stanislaŭ Bahdankievič
- Founded: 1 October 1995; 30 years ago
- Banned: 15 August 2023; 3 years ago
- Merger of: United Democratic Party; Civic Party
- Headquarters: 22nd Building, Charužaj St, Minsk
- Youth wing: Young Democrats
- Membership (2011): 4,000
- Ideology: Conservatism; Economic liberalism; Liberalism; Pro-Europeanism
- Political position: Centre-right
- National affiliation: United Democratic Forces of Belarus
- European affiliation: European People's Party (observer)
- International affiliation: International Democrat Union
- Colours: Red; White
- Slogan: «Construct a new, keep the best» (Belarusian: «Пабудуем новае, захаваем лепшае»)

Website
- ucpb.info

The United Civic Party (UCP; Belarusian: Аб'яднаная грамадзянская партыя; АГП, romanized: Abjadnanaja hramadzianskaja partyja; AHP; Russian: Объединённая гражданская партия; ОГП, romanized: Obyedinonnaya grazhdanskaya partiya; OGP) is a banned conservative and liberal political party in Belarus. The party opposes the government of Alexander Lukashenko and has participated in the country's elections on a few occasions, but it did not have a single member in the Belarusian parliament until one member was elected during the 2016 elections. It claims that its lack of seats is due to the unfairness of the election process.

Famous party members are former Prime Minister Michaił Čyhir, the mysteriously disappeared politicians Jury Zacharanka and Viktar Hančar, and Hienadź Karpienka, who died prematurely.

== History ==
The party was established in 1995 as a result of a merger of two like-minded parties, the United Democratic Party (formed in 1990) and the Civil Party (formed in 1994). The party's chairman is Mikałaj Kazłoŭ; deputy chairmen are Alaksandar Dabravolski and Jarasłaŭ Ramančuk.

At the legislative elections, 13–17 October 2004, the party was part of the People's Coalition 5 Plus, which did not secure any seats. According to the OSCE/ODIHR Election Observation Mission, these elections fell significantly short of OSCE commitments. Universal principles and constitutionally guaranteed rights of expression, association and assembly were seriously challenged, calling into question the Belarusian authorities’ willingness to respect the concept of political competition on a basis of equal treatment. According to this mission principles of an inclusive democratic process, whereby citizens have the right to seek political office without discrimination, candidates to present their views without obstruction, and voters to learn about them and discuss them freely, were largely ignored.

In the 2008 elections, the party ran on its own, finishing in third place with 2.33 percent of the official vote and no seats gained. As with most of the opposition parties, the UCP boycotted the 2012 election, urging its supporters to abstain from voting so as not to give credence to the process.

For the 2016 elections, the party formed an alliance with the BPF Party, the Belarusian Christian Democracy, the Social Democratic Party (Assembly), the 'Za svabodu' movement, the Green Party, the BLPFP, the Trade Union of Electric Industry and independent candidates. Party candidate Hanna Kanapackaja won a seat in the 97th electoral district in the Kastryčnickaja district of Minsk, making her and one other independent candidate the first opposition MPs represented in parliament since 2004. The party didn't win any seats in the 2019 Belarusian parliamentary election, and with the loss of the other pro-opposition independent, left it and the opposition without any representation within the House of Representatives once again.

On 15 August 2023, the United Civic Party was banned by the Supreme Court of Belarus.

== Structure ==
UCP has a women's organisation and a youth organisation.

In 1995–2000, the youth organisation of the UCP was "Civil Forum", which left UCP during parliamentary elections of 2000, when the UCP boycotted it against the wishes of Civil Forum. Uładzimier Navasiad, chairman of Civil Forum, ran and won a seat in Parliament.

In 2000, the youth organisation was "UCP Youth", created to replace Civil Forum, but was rather an artificial structure in the party.

From later that year until 2009, YCSU Young Democrats was officially a youth wing of UCP, but in February 2009 at the congress of YCSU Young Democrats, a decision to stop cooperating with the party was taken. Some members did not support the decision to restrain cooperation with United Civic Party and left, staying as UCP Youth.

== Electoral performance ==
=== Presidential elections ===
| Election | Candidate | First round | | Second round | | Result |
| Election | Candidate | Votes | % | Votes | % | Result |
|---|---|---|---|---|---|---|
| 1994 | Endorsed Stanislav Shushkevich | 585,143 | 9.91% | | | Lost ✗ |
| 1999 | Mikhail Chigir | No winner announced | | | | |
| 2001 | Endorsed Uładzimir Hančaryk | 965,261 | 15.65% | | | Lost ✗ |
| 2006 | Endorsed Alaksandar Milinkievič | 405,486 | 6.12% | | | Lost ✗ |
| 2010 | Jaroslav Romanchuk | 127,281 | 1.98% | | | Lost ✗ |
| 2015 | Anatoly Lebedko | Not admitted to the elections | | | | |
| 2020 | Mikalaj Kazloŭ | Not admitted to the elections, Endorsed Tsikhanouskaya | | | | |
| 2020 | Uladzimir Niapomniaščych | Not admitted to the elections | | | | |

=== Legislative elections ===
| Election | Party leader | Performance | | | | | Rank | Government |
| Election | Party leader | Votes | % | ± pp | Seats | +/– | Rank | Government |
|---|---|---|---|---|---|---|---|---|
| 1995 | Stanislaŭ Bahdankievič | No data | 3.1% | New | 6 / 260 | New | 4th | Opposition |
| 2000 | Anatoly Lebedko | Boycotted the elections | | | | | | Extra-parliamentary |
| 2004 | Anatoly Lebedko | 160,011 | 2.62% (5 Plus) | ▼0.48 | 0 / 110 | 0 | ▼7th | Extra-parliamentary |
| 2008 | Anatoly Lebedko | 125,276 | 2.33% | ▼0.29 | 0 / 110 | 0 | ▲4th | Extra-parliamentary |
| 2012 | Anatoly Lebedko | Boycotted the elections | | | | | | Extra-parliamentary |
| 2016 | Anatoly Lebedko | 111,227 | 2.16% | ▼0.17 | 1 / 110 | ▲1 | ▼5th | Opposition |
| 2019 | Mikalaj Kazloŭ | 72,192 | 1.37% | ▼0.79 | 0 / 110 | ▼1 | ▼8th | Extra-parliamentary |
