= Belarusian Green Party =

Banned political party in Belarus

Belarusian Green Party Беларуская партыя «Зялёныя» Белорусская партия «Зелёные»
- Abbreviation: BGP; БПЗ
- Leader: Dzmitry Kuchuk
- Founder: Oleg Gromyko
- Founded: 17 April 1994; 32 years ago
- Registered: 3 June 1994; 32 years ago
- Banned: 27 July 2023; 3 years ago
- Headquarters: 4th Building, Fabriciusa St, Minsk
- Newspaper: Peaceful Atom
- Membership (2009): 1,143
- Ideology: Green politics Eco-socialism; Environmentalism; Anti-capitalism; Alter-globalism
- Political position: Left-wing
- European affiliation: European Green Party (Associate)
- International affiliation: Global Greens (Associate)
- Colours: Green

The Belarusian Green Party (BGP or BPZ; Belarusian: Беларуская партыя «Зялёныя»; БПЗ, romanized: Bielaruskaja partyja «Zialionyja»; BPZ; Russian: Белорусская партия «Зелёные»; БПЗ, romanized: Belorusskaya partiya «Zelonyye»; BPZ, literally "Belarusian Party «The Greens»") is a banned eco-socialist green party in Belarus which opposes the administration of president Alexander Lukashenko, led by entrepreneur Dzmitry Kuchuk (Дзмітрый Кучук). It was created in 1994. The party has an anti-corporatist, anti-globalist platform.

== History ==
The previous leader of the party until January 2020 was Nastassya Darafeyeva (Настасся Дарафеева), who in 2015 succeeded long-time leader Aleh Novikaŭ (Алег Новікаў), also known as Lolik Uškin (Лёлік Ушкін), who had led the party since 2007.

The party has not held seats in the National Assembly of Belarus since its creation.

On 27 July 2023 the Belarusian Green Party was ordered liquidated by the Supreme Court of Belarus.

== Ideology ==
In late 2008, the Belarusian Green Party created a special commission on LGBT rights, becoming the first political party in Belarus to officially announce support for the LGBT community.

The Belarusian Green Party opposes the practice of the death penalty, and Belarus remains the last country in Europe with capital punishment. The party has also sharply criticized the US government for continuing to permit the death penalty at a state level. Members of the party strongly protested the executions of Dmitri Konovalov and Vladislav Kovalev, who were convicted of the 2011 Minsk Metro bombing in a controversial trial.

The party is an associate member of the European Green Party.

== Electoral history ==
=== Presidential elections ===
Election	Candidate	First round		Second round		Result
Election	Candidate	Votes	%	Votes	%	Result
2010	Yuri Glushakov	Not admitted to the elections				
2015	Yuri Shulgan	Not admitted to the elections				
2020	Did not contest					

=== Legislative elections ===
Election	Leader	Performance					Rank	Government
Election	Leader	Votes	%	+/–	Seats	+/–	Rank	Government
1995	Oleg Gromyko				1 / 260	New	10th	Opposition
2000	Aleh Novikaŭ	Did not contest						Extra-parliamentary
2004	Aleh Novikaŭ	Did not contest						Extra-parliamentary
2008	Aleh Novikaŭ	Did not contest						Extra-parliamentary
2012	Aleh Novikaŭ	Did not contest						Extra-parliamentary
2016	Nastassya Darafeyeva	9,038	0.18%	New	0 / 110	0	▲9th	Extra-parliamentary
2019	Nastassya Darafeyeva	10,592	0.20%	▲0.02	0 / 110	0	▼11th	Extra-parliamentary

== See also ==
- Green Party
- Green politics
- List of environmental organizations
