= Belarusian Social Democratic Party (Hramada) =

Banned political party in Belarus

Belarusian Social Democratic Party (Hramada) Беларуская сацыял-дэмакратычная партыя (Грамада) Белорусская социал-демократическая партия (Грамада)
- Abbreviation: BSDP (Hramada); БСДП (Грамада)
- Leader: Ihar Barysaŭ
- Founder: Anatol Laŭkovič
- Founded: 25 June 2005; 21 years ago
- Banned: 20 September 2023; 3 years ago
- Split from: Belarusian Social Democratic Party (People's Assembly); Belarusian Labour Party
- Headquarters: 9-607th building, Kulman St, Minsk, Belarus
- Newspaper: Adliustravannie, Pazicyja
- Youth wing: Young Social Democrats — Young Hramada
- Membership (2019): 1,127
- Ideology: Social democracy Liberal democracy Pro-Europeanism
- Political position: Centre-left
- National affiliation: United Democratic Forces of Belarus
- European affiliation: Party of European Socialists
- International affiliation: Progressive Alliance
- Colours: Red; White
- Slogan: «We think about everyone — we work together!» (Belarusian: «Думаем пра кожнага — працуем разам!»)
- Anthem: The Internationale translated by Yanka Kupala

Party flag

Website
- bsdp.org

The Belarusian Social Democratic Party (Hramada) (Note: Hramada means "assembly" in Belarusian and refers to the traditional form of social organization in Belarus) (Belarusian: Беларуская сацыял-дэмакратычная партыя (Грамада́), Łacinka: Bielaruskaja sacyjal-demakratyčnaja partyja (Hramada); Russian: Белорусская социал-демократическая партия (Громада́), romanized: Belarusskaya Social-Demokraticheskaya Partiya (Hromada)) is a banned social-democratic political party in Belarus that opposes the government of president Alexander Lukashenko.

== History ==
The party was founded in 2005 after the split within the BSDP (People's Assembly). It considers itself the successor of the historical Belarusian Socialist Assembly founded in 1902. Alaksandar Kazulin, a former rector of Belarusian State University, became the first party leader of the new registered party. The BSDP (People's Assembly) remained without registration and office.

At the legislative elections in 13–17 October 2004, the party did not secure any seats. These elections fell significantly short of OSCE commitments, according to the OSCE/ODIHR Election Observation Mission. Its candidate at the presidential election of 2006, Alaksandar Kazulin, won 2.3% of the vote.

In 2011, Iryna Veshtard was elected as the new chairman of the party.

On 20 September 2023, the party was banned by the Supreme Court of Belarus.

== Ideology and goals of the party ==
The Belarusian Social Democratic Party belongs to the community of parties associated with the Socialist International. BSDP focuses on Western European social-democratic ideology and is supported by various Western European social democratic parties. The main task of the country's foreign party promotes not only the entry of Belarus into the European Union and NATO, but also promotes the accession of Russia, Ukraine and Moldova.

== Electoral history ==
=== Presidential elections ===
Election	Candidate	First round		Second round		Result
Election	Candidate	Votes	%	Votes	%	Result
2006	Alyaksandr Kazulin	147,402	2.23%			Lost ✗
2010	Mikola Statkevich	67,583	1.05%			Lost ✗
2015	Tatsiana Karatkevich	271,426	4.48%			Lost ✗
2020	Endorsed Sviatlana Tsikhanouskaya	588,622	10.12%			Lost ✗

=== Legislative elections ===
Election	Party leader	Performance					Rank	Government
Election	Party leader	Votes	%	± pp	Seats	+/–	Rank	Government
2008	Anatol Laŭkovič	17,380	0.32%	▼2.51	0 / 110	0	8th	Extra-parliamentary
2012	Iryna Veshtard	38,471	0.73%	▲0.41	0 / 110	0	▲6th	Extra-parliamentary
2016	Iryna Veshtard	66,381	1.29%	▲0.56	0 / 110	0	▼8th	Extra-parliamentary
2019	Ihar Barysaŭ	84,790	1.61%	▲0.32	0 / 110	0	▲6th	Extra-parliamentary

== Leadership ==
№	Image	Name	Tenure
1		Michaś Tkačoŭ	1991– 1992
2		Aleh Trusaŭ	1992– 1995
3		Mikola Statkevich	1995– 2005
4		Anatol Laŭkovič	2005– 2006
5		Alyaksandr Kazulin	2006– 2008
6		Anatol Laŭkovič	2008– 2010
7		Anatol Sidarevič	2010– 2011
8		Iryna Veshtard	2011– 2018
9		Ihar Barysaŭ	2018; Incumbent

== See also ==
- Belarusian Social Democratic Assembly
- Belarusian Social Democratic Party (People's Assembly)
- Social Democratic Party of Popular Accord
