= Belarusian Social Democratic Party (People's Hramada) =

Belarusian political party

Belarusian Social Democratic Party (People's Hramada) Народная Грамада Народная Громада
- Abbreviation: Narodnaya Hramada (NH) (English); НАРОДНАЯ ГРАМАДА (НГ) (Belarusian); НАРОДНАЯ ГРАМАДА (НГ) (Russian)
- Leader: Mikałaj Statkievič
- Founded: 29 June 1996; 30 years ago
- Banned: 19 February 2005; 21 years ago (officially deregistered)
- Merger of: BSDH; PNZ
- Merged into: BSDP (Hramada) (factions)
- Membership (2002): 4,076
- Ideology: Social democracy Sustainable development Non-interventionism
- Political position: Centre-left
- International affiliation: Socialist International
- Colours: red and white

Party flag

Website
- hramada.org

The Belarusian Social Democratic Party (People's Hramada) (Note: Hramada means "assembly" in Belarusian and refers to the traditional form of social organization in Belarus) (Belarusian: Беларуская сацыял-дэмакратычная партыя (Народная Грамада), romanized: Bielaruskaja Sacyjal-Demakratyčnaja Partyja (Narodnaja Hramada); Russian: Белорусская социал-демократическая партия (Народная Грамада), romanized: Belorusskaya sotsial-demokraticheskaya partiya (Narodnaya Gramada)) is an unregistered social-democratic political party in Belarus that opposes the administration of President Alexander Lukashenko.

The party is a full member of the Socialist International.

== History ==
The BSDP (People's Assembly) was established in March 1991. It calls itself the successor of the Belarusian Socialist Hramada, which was founded in 1903.

The party was left unregistered in 2004, when the government claimed that the reelection of party leader Mikalay Statkevich had been conducted illegally. Some party members then formed the Belarusian Social Democratic Party (Assembly), which was registered.

In legislative elections held between October 13–17, 2004, the party did not secure any seats.

On May 31, 2020, the party's leader Mikola Statkevich was arrested on his way to a rally where signatures for Svetlana Tikhanovskaya were being gathered. He was sentenced to 15 days for participating in an unsanctioned protest. This sentence was extended two more times, and he was tried again on June 29 for organizing unrest. Viasna Human Rights Centre called the accusations politically motivated and demanded the immediate release of Statkevich.

On December 14, 2021, Statkevich was sentenced to 14 years in prison. Along with him, Ihar Losik, Sergei Tikhanovsky and three other political prisoners were also sentenced. Throughout the 565 days he has spent in detention, Statkevich was not allowed to get access to legal representation or defence and he has been denied all contact with his family.

== Electoral results ==
=== Legislative elections ===
Election	Leader	Performance					Rank	Government
Election	Leader	Votes	%	+/–	Seats	+/–	Rank	Government
1995	Mikola Statkevich	Created after elections			17 / 260	New	3rd	Opposition
2000	Mikola Statkevich				0 / 110	▼17	▼8th	Extra-parliamentary
2004	Mikola Statkevich	173,129	2.83%	New	0 / 110	0	▲4th	Extra-parliamentary

== See also ==
- Belarusian Social Democratic Assembly
- Belarusian Social Democratic Party (Assembly)
- Social Democratic Party of Popular Accord
