= Belarusian Agrarian Party =

Political party in Belarus

Belarusian Agrarian Party Белорусская аграрная партия Беларуская аграрная партыя
- Abbreviation: BAP (English); БАП
- Leader: Mikhail Rusy
- Founder: Syamyon Sharetski
- Founded: 13 June 1992
- Dissolved: August 2023
- Headquarters: 7th«A» Building, Fabriciusa St, Minsk, Belarus. 220007
- Membership (2009): 8,500
- Ideology: Agrarian socialism; Pro-Lukashenko; Historical: Anti-Lukashenko
- Political position: Left-wing
- National affiliation: RKSKPPGA
- Colours: Red; Green
- House of Representatives (2019): 1 / 110
- Local seats (2018): 1 / 18,120

The Belarusian Agrarian Party (Russian: Белорусская аграрная партия, romanized: Belorusskaja agrarnaja partija; Belarusian: Беларуская аграрная партыя, romanized: Bielaruskaja ahrarnaja partyja) was an agrarian socialist political party in Belarus. It supported the government of Alexander Lukashenko. The leader of the party was Mikhail Rusy, who succeeded Mikhail Shimansky on 15 March 2008.

In August 2023, the party dissolved itself.

== Ideology ==
The party advocates the reform of society on the principles of democratic socialism, the restructuring of the economy on the basis of private and state ownership of the means of production, including land. In agriculture it recognizes the forms: production cooperative, joint-stock company, collective and state farm, peasant farm and small enterprise.

== History ==
It was created in 1992 as the United Agrarian Democratic Party of Belarus (Russian: Объединенная аграрно-демократическая партия Беларуси, romanized: Obyedinennaya agrarno-demokraticheskaya partiya Belarusi; Belarusian: Аб'яднанная аграрно-демократическая партия Беларуси, romanized: Abjadnannaja ahrarno-diemokratičjeskaja partija Bielarusi). On 28 January 1994, it changed its name into Agrarian Party.

At the legislative election in 1995, the party obtained 33 out of 198 seats.

The 1996 constitutional crisis split the party into those who supported Lukashenko and those who, together with Syamyon Sharetski (the first party chairman), remained in the Supreme Soviet.

Syamyon Sharetski did not recognize the results of the 1996 constitutional referendum and did not submit to the decision to dissolve the Supreme Soviet. In July 1999, as the head of the legitimate legislative body recognized by the West, Syamyon Sharetski was adopted in Lithuania, where he stayed for two years. In July 2001, Syamyon Sharetski left for the United States and ceased his political activities.

On September 22, 1999, the party was re-registered.

The IV Party Congress at the end of March 2000 announced its intention to cooperate with the authorities and elected Mikhail Shimansky as its chairman.

On June 12, 2009, the Ministry of Justice of Belarus issued a written warning in connection with the fact that the party did not submit information about its activities to the Ministry.

In 2000 and 2004 it only gained 5 and 3 seats in the House of Representatives, respectively. In 2008, the party was reduced to one seat. In the 2016 election, the party lost its remaining seat. It regained a seat in the assembly in the 2019 Belarusian parliamentary election.

== Electoral performance ==
=== Presidential elections ===
Election	Candidate	First round		Second round		Result
Election	Candidate	Votes	%	Votes	%	Result
1994	Alaksandar Dubko	353,119	5.98%			Lost ✗
2001	Endorsed Alexander Lukashenko	4,666,680	75.65%			Elected ✓
2006	Endorsed Alexander Lukashenko	5,501,249	82.97%			Elected ✓
2010	Endorsed Alexander Lukashenko	5,130,557	79.65%			Elected ✓
2015	Endorsed Alexander Lukashenko	5,102,478	83.47%			Elected ✓
2020	Endorsed Alexander Lukashenko	4,661,075	80.10%			Elected ✓

=== Legislative elections ===
Election	Party leader	Performance					Rank	Government
Election	Party leader	Votes	%	± pp	Seats	+/–	Rank	Government
1995	Syamyon Sharetski	No data	13.1%	New	34 / 260	New	2nd	Opposition
2000	Mikhail Shimansky	No data			5 / 110	▼29	2nd	Support
2004	Mikhail Shimansky	145,004	2.38%	▲2.38	3 / 110	▼2	2nd	Support
2008	Mikhail Rusy	32,230	0.60%	▼1.78	1 / 110	▼2	2nd	Coalition
2012	Mikhail Rusy	40,488	0.77%	▲0.17	1 / 110	0	▼3rd	Support
2016	Mikhail Rusy	Did not contest						Extra-parliamentary
2019	Mikhail Rusy	46,785	0.89%	▲0.89	1 / 110	▲1	▲5th	Support

== See also ==
- Agrarian Party of Russia
- Agrarian Party of Ukraine
