= Belarusian Peasant Party =

Former political party in Belarus

The Belarusian Peasant Party (Belarusian: Беларуская сялянская партыя, romanized: Byelaruskaya syalyanskaya party'ya, BSP; Russian: Беларуская крестьянская партия, BKP) was a right-wing liberal political party in Belarus.

== History ==
The BSP was founded on 23 February 1991. The party contested the 1995 parliamentary elections, winning one seat in the second round of voting. When the National Assembly was established in 1996, the party was not given any seats in the House of Representatives.

The party folded in 1999 after failing to re-register. In that year, it reported having 12,000 members.
