= Belarusian Socialist Party =

Former political party in Belarus

The Belarusian Socialist Party (Belarusian: Беларуская сацыялістычная партыя, Belorusskaia socialisticheskaia partiia, BSP) was a political party in Belarus.

== History ==
The party contested the 1995 parliamentary elections, winning one seat in the second round of voting. Its sole MP joined the United Civic Party of Belarus following the election. When the National Assembly was established in 1996, the party was given one seat in the House of Representatives. The party folded in 1999 after failing to re-register.
