= Novy Shlyah =

Belarusian newspaper

Novy Shlyah was a newspaper of the Belarusian National Socialist Party. It was published from November 1933 to November 1937 in Vilnius in Belarusian in Cyrillic and Latin. The newspaper had the support of the Foreign Policy Department of the National Socialist Workers' Party of Germany. The editor-publisher was Vladislav Kozlovsky.

Novy Shlyah promoted the ideas of National Socialism, printed documents and materials of the BNSP, sharply criticized national and economic policy, the construction of socialism in the BSSR, the activities of the Comintern and the Communist Party of Western Belarus. Newspaper also paid a lot of attention to events in the world, especially in Germany, raised the Jewish question, the problems of education and the Belarusian people in general. Biographies of BNSP leaders Fabian Akincic, Vladislav Kozlovsky, Konstantin Yukhnevich, literary and journalistic works of Vladislav Kozlovsky, Albin Stepovich, critical reviews of individual issues of the newspapers "Young Belarus" and "Colossus" also were posted on the pages of the Novy Shlyah. The circulation of the newspaper did not exceed 500 copies. 26 issues were published before Novy Shlyah was banned by Polish authorities.
