= Belarusian Social Democratic Assembly =

Banned political party in Belarus

Party «Belarusian Social Democratic Assembly» Партыя «Беларуская сацыял-дэмакратычная Грамада» Партия «Белорусская социал-демократическая Грамада»
- Abbreviation: BSDH; БСДГ
- Chairman: Siarhei Cherachen
- Deputy Chairman: Anatol Astapienka
- Founder: Michail Tkačoŭ (1991); Stanislav Shushkevich (1998)
- Founded: 21 May 1991; 35 years ago (original) 15 February 1998; 28 years ago (reconstruction)
- Banned: 15 March 1996; 30 years ago (first) 15 August 2023; 3 years ago (second)
- Preceded by: Belarusian Socialist Assembly (self-declared)
- Merged into: Belarusian Social Democratic Party (People's Assembly) (1996–1998)
- Headquarters: 66th Building, Karl Liebknecht St, Minsk, 220013
- Membership (2021): 2,930
- Ideology: Social democracy Civic nationalism Pro-Europeanism
- Political position: Centre-left
- Colours: Red; White
- Slogan: «We are Belarus! With love to the Motherland» (Belarusian: «Мы — Беларусь! З любоўю да Радзімы»)

Website
- bsdg.by

The Belarusian Social Democratic Assembly (BSDH; Belarusian: Беларуская сацыял-дэмакратычная Грамада; БСДГ, romanized: Biełaruskaja sacyjał-demakratyčnaja Hramada; Russian: Белорусская социал-демократическая Грамада; БСДГ, romanized: Belorusskaya sotsial-demokraticheskaya Gramada; BSDG), commonly shortened to "Hramada" or "The Assembly", is a banned Belarusian social-democratic political party. Businessman Siarhiej Čeračań has been the leader of the party since October 2018.

== Leadership ==
The previous head of the party from 1998 to 2018 was Stanislav Shushkevich, who has the distinction of having been the first head of state of the Republic of Belarus after its independence from the Soviet Union, between 1991 and 1994. After running unsuccessfully for president in the 1994 election, he did not participate in politics again until helping to form the party in 1998. In 2004 he was not allowed to register as a candidate and so in the 2010 presidential election he was a supporter of candidate Andrei Sannikov.

== History ==
- 1991 — Creation of the Belarusian Social Democratic Assembly, with Aleh Trusaŭ as a chairman.
- 1992 — Aleh Trusaǔ becomes party chairman.
- 1995 — Formation of the Social Democratic Union with other centre-left parties for the parliamentary election.
- 1996 — Association with Social Democratic Party of Popular Accord, formation of the Belarusian Social Democratic Party (People's Assembly).
- 1998 — Reconstruction of the Belarusian Social Democratic Assembly, Stanisłaŭ Šuškievič becomes chairman.
- 2016 — The party boycotts the 2016 Belarusian parliamentary elections.
- 2018 — Siarhiej Čeračań becomes party chairman.

On 15 August 2023, the Supreme Court of Belarus banned the Belarusian Social Democratic Assembly.

== Electoral history ==
=== Presidential elections ===
Election	Candidate	First round		Second round		Result
Election	Candidate	Votes	%	Votes	%	Result
1994	Endorsed Stanislav Shushkevich	585,143	9.91%			Lost ✗
2001	Endorsed Zianon Pazniak	Not admitted to the elections				
2006	Endorsed Alaksandar Milinkievič	405,486	6.12%			Lost ✗
2010	Did not contest					
2015	Did not contest					
2020	Siarhei Cherachen	66,613	1.14%			Lost ✗

=== Legislative elections ===
Election	Leader	Performance					Rank	Government
Election	Leader	Votes	%	+/–	Seats	+/–	Rank	Government
1995	Aleh Trusaŭ				2 / 260	New	5th	Opposition
2000	Stanislav Shushkevich	Boycotted						Extra-parliamentary
2004	Stanislav Shushkevich	59,892	0.98%	New	0 / 110	0	▼7th	Extra-parliamentary
2008	Stanislav Shushkevich	693	0.01%	▼0.97	0 / 110	0	▼9th	Extra-parliamentary
2012	Stanislav Shushkevich	Did not contest						Extra-parliamentary
2016	Stanislav Shushkevich	Did not contest						Extra-parliamentary
2019	Siarhei Cherachen	23,164	0.44%	▲0.43	0 / 110	0	▼10th	Extra-parliamentary

== See also ==
- Belarusian Socialist Assembly
