= 2019 Belarusian parliamentary election =

- 17 November 2019
- All 110 seats in the House of Representatives; 56 seats needed for a majority
- Turnout: 77.31% (▲2.63pp)
Party	Leader	Vote %	Seats	+/–
CPB	Aliaksiej Sokal	10.62	11	+3
RPTS	Vasil Zadnyaprany	6.75	6	+3
LDPB	Oleg Gaidukevich	5.33	1	0
BPP	Nikolai Ulakhovich	1.43	2	−1
BAP	Mikhail Rusy	0.89	1	+1
Independents	–	60.31	89	−5
This lists parties that won seats. See the complete results below.
Speaker of the House of Representatives before	Speaker of the House of Representatives after
Vladimir Andreichenko; CPB	Vladimir Andreichenko; CPB

Parliamentary elections were held in Belarus on 17 November 2019.

== Background ==
Parliamentary elections were required to be held no later than 6 September 2020. However, in his annual address to the nation on 19 April 2019, President Alexander Lukashenko announced that they would be held in 2019. Lukashenko suggested Sunday 7 November or October Revolution Day as possible dates, however the election was ultimately scheduled for 17 November 2019.

== Electoral system ==
The 110 members of the House of Representatives were elected from single-member constituencies by first-past-the-post voting.

== Participating parties ==
Party	Leader	Ideology	Stance toward President Lukashenko	Number of participating constituencies	2016 result	
Party	Leader	Ideology	Stance toward President Lukashenko	Number of participating constituencies	Votes (%)	Seats
Communist Party of Belarus (CPB)	Aliaksiej Sokal	Communism; Marxism–Leninism	Pro-government	54	7.4%	8 / 110
Liberal Democratic Party of Belarus (LDPB)	Oleg Gaidukevich	Russian-Belarusian unionism Right-wing populism	Constructive opposition (self-proclaimed); Pro-government (de facto)	107	4.2%	1 / 110
Republican Party of Labour and Justice (RPTS)	Vasil Zadnyaprany	Democratic socialism Social democracy	Pro-government	43	2.9%	3 / 110
United Civic Party (UCP)	Mikalaj Kazloŭ	Liberal conservatism Social liberalism	Opposition	56	2.2%	1 / 110
Belarusian Patriotic Party (BPP)	Nikolai Ulakhovich	Socialism; Social conservatism	Pro-government	16	2.2%	3 / 110
BPF Party (BPF)	Ryhor Kastusioŭ	Belarusian nationalism Christian democracy	Opposition	38	1.7%	0 / 110
Belarusian Left Party "A Just World"	Sergey Kalyakin	Democratic socialism Communism	Opposition	33	1.4%	0 / 110
Belarusian Social Democratic Party (Assembly) (BSDP)	Ihar Barysaŭ	Social democracy Liberal democracy	Opposition	43	1.3%	0 / 110
Belarusian Party "The Greens" (BPZ)	Nastassya Darafeyeva	Green politics Eco-socialism	Opposition	7	0.2%	0 / 110
Belarusian Social Democratic Assembly (BSDH)	Siarhei Cherachen	Social democracy National democracy	Opposition	20	—N/a	
Republican Party (RP)	Uladzimir Belazor	Eurasianism; Economic nationalism	Pro-government	6	—N/a	
Belarusian Agrarian Party (AP)	Mikhail Rusy	Agrarian socialism Democratic socialism	Pro-Government	1	—N/a	
Belarusian Social Sporting Party (BSSP)	Vladimir Alexandrovich	Social democracy Sports politics	Pro-government	1	—N/a	

== Opinion polls ==
Date	Polling firm	KPB	LDPB	RPTS	UCP	BPP	BPF	A Just World	BSDP	The Greens	BSSP	BSDH	BAP (Note: These parties do not compete in the election.)	KCP-BPF	SDPNS	RP	Independents/ None	Lead
July–August 2017	Institute of Sociology of the National Academy of Sciences	2.6	1.9	2.6	2.2	1.5	0.7	1.5	1.6	2.3	1.7	1.6	1.1	1.1	0.9	0.7	76.0	Tie
11 September 2016	2016 Parliamentary elections	7.4	4.2	2.9	2.2	2.2	1.7	1.4	1.3	0.2	—N/a	—N/a	—N/a	—N/a	—N/a	—N/a	67.0+9.6	2.0

== Campaign ==
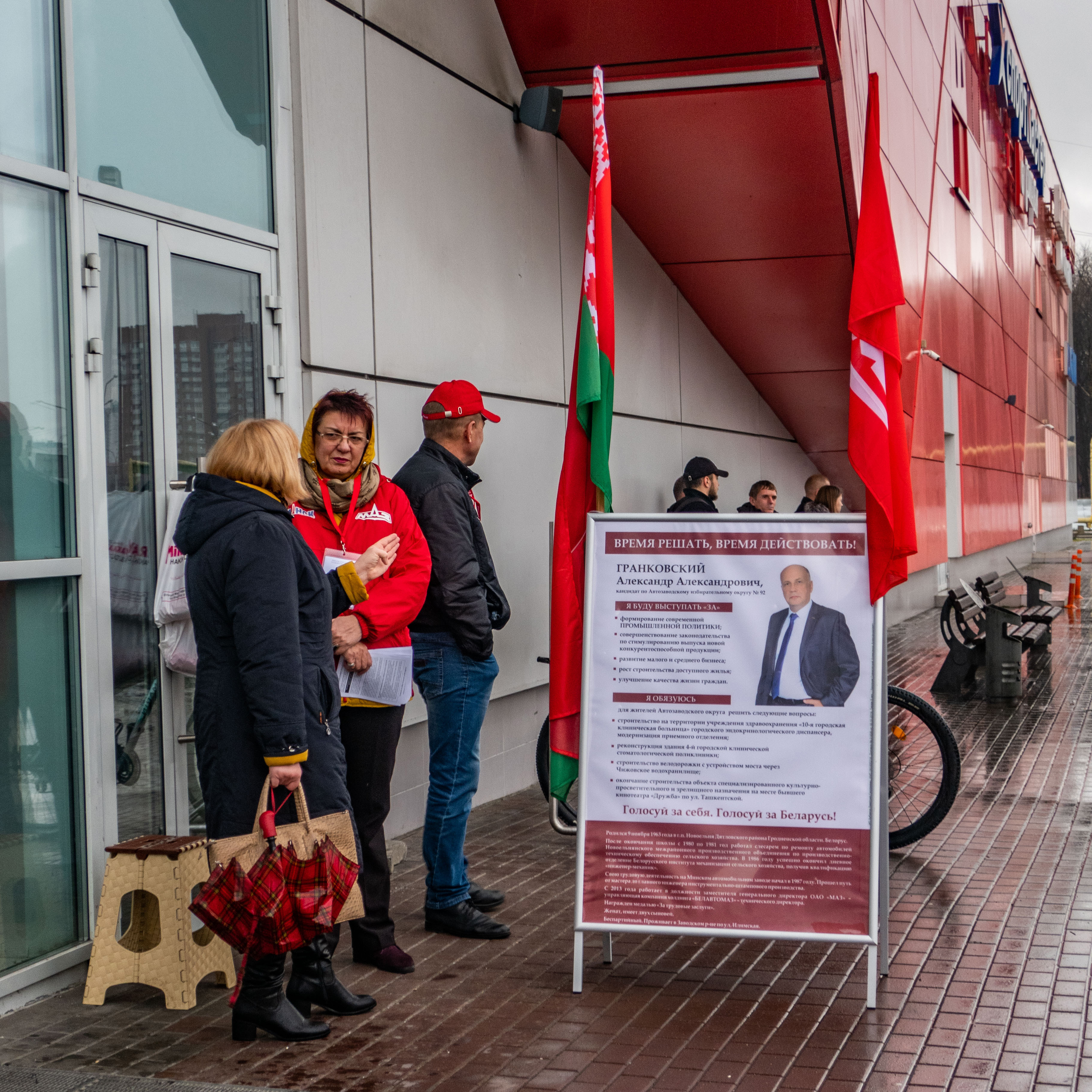
Street agitation near the shopping mall for one of the candidates in the 92nd "Aŭtazavod" constituency (Minsk)

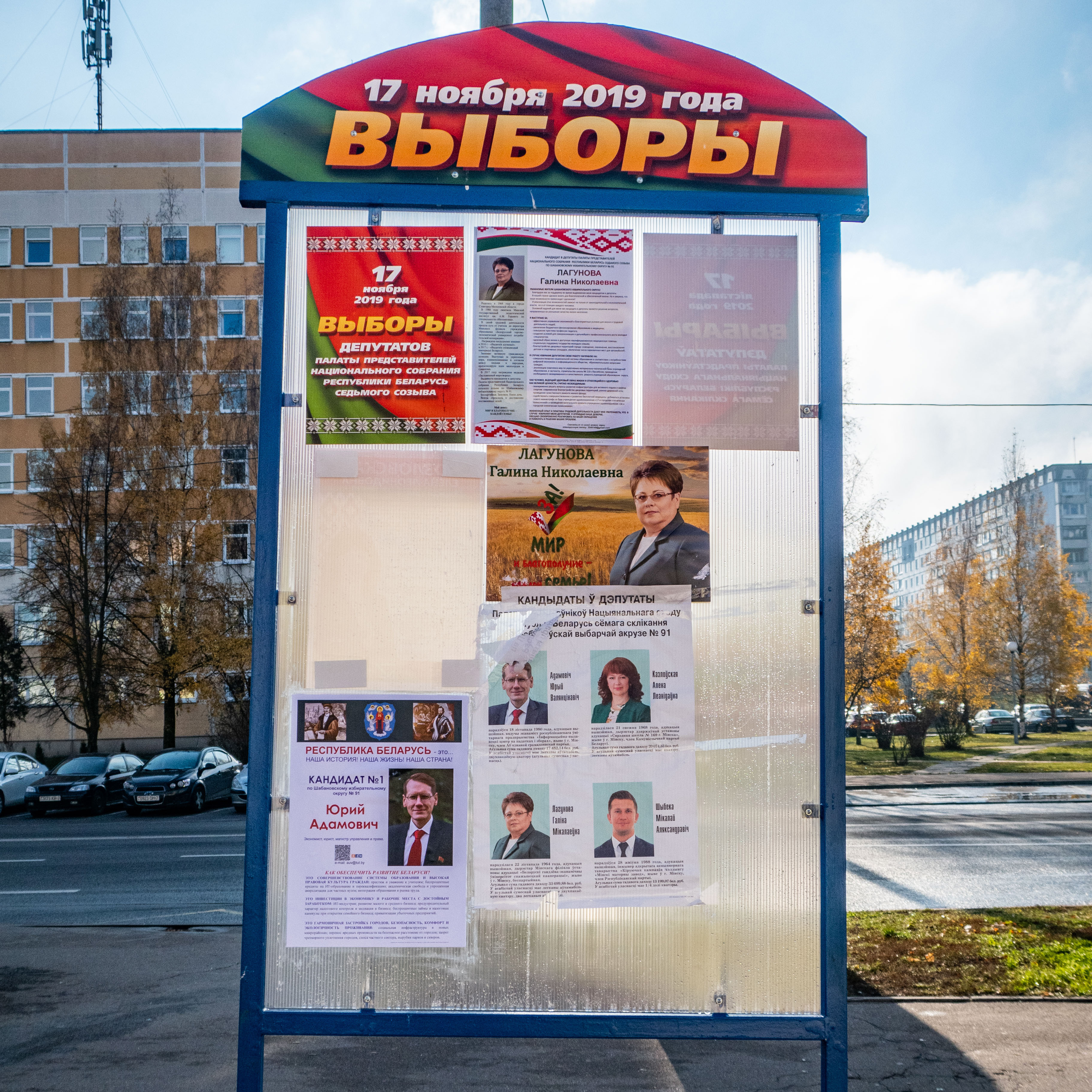
Information board with 4 candidates competing in the 91st "Šabany" constituency (Minsk)

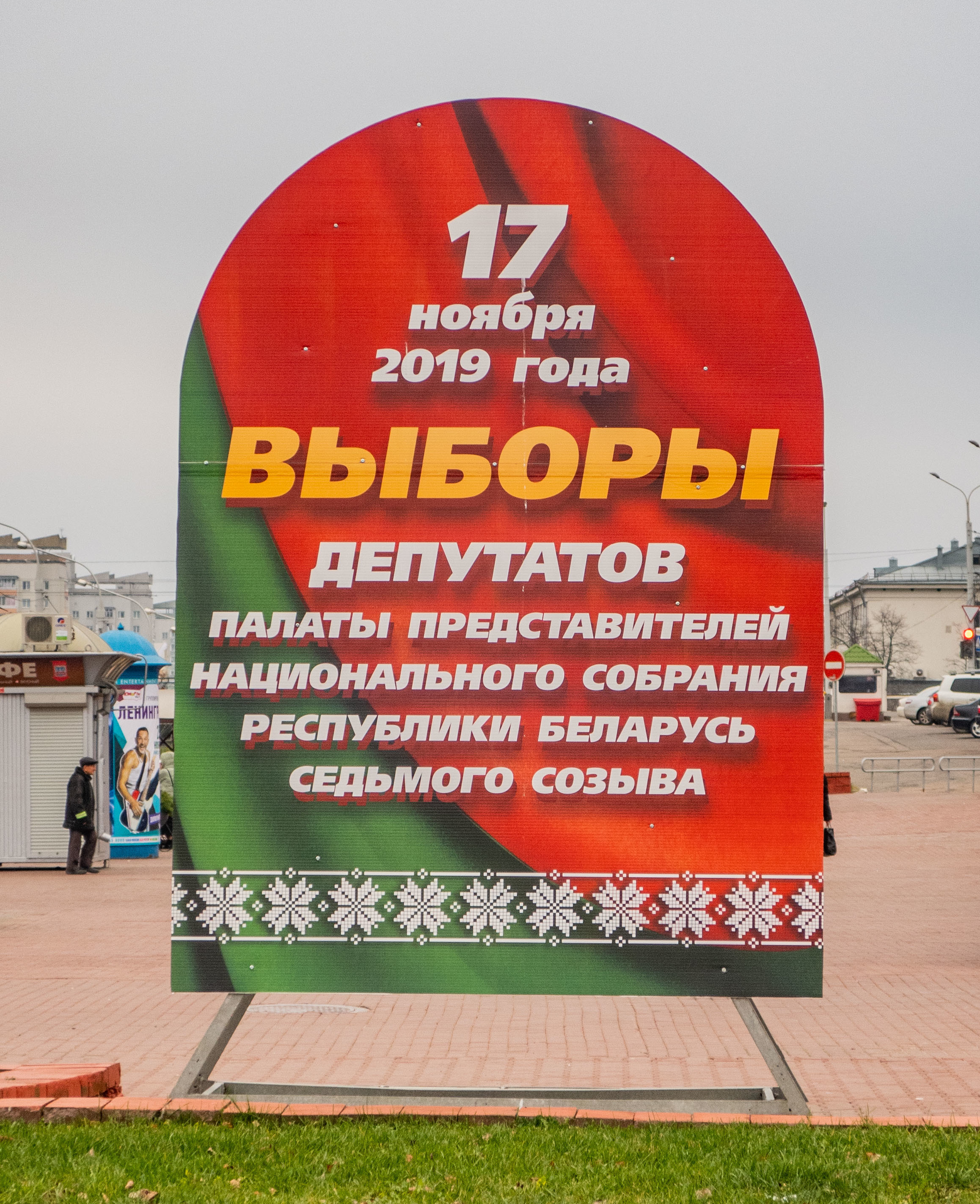
Street banner

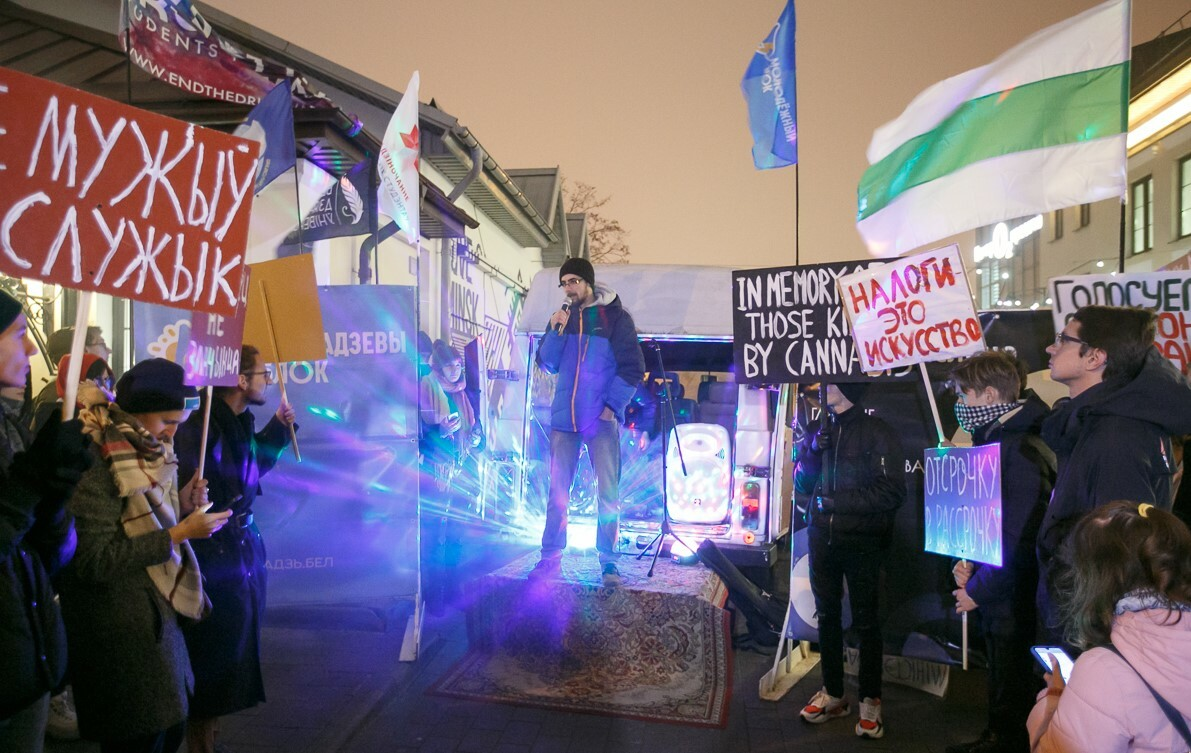
Meeting of opposition candidates from the Youth Bloc on Zybitskaya street (Minsk)

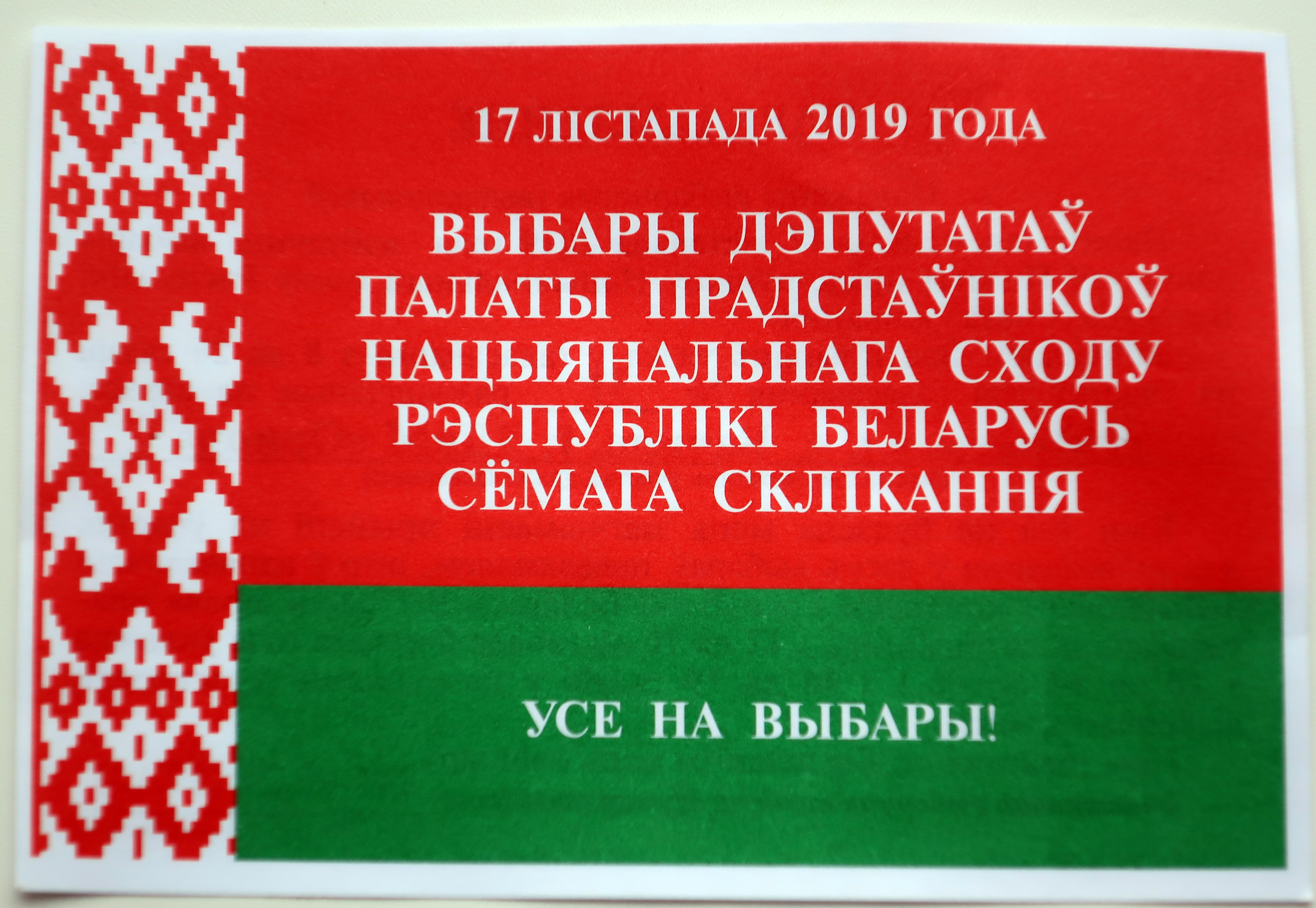
Voter invitation card

Most opposition parties decided to contest the election but not all candidates were registered. The Conservative Christian Party and the Belarusian Social-Democratic Assembly decided to boycott the elections.

== Conduct ==
On 13 November, during preliminary voting, an observer in Brest published a video showing alleged ballot stuffing. Lidia Yermoshina, chief of the Central Election Commission of Belarus, denied fraud had taken place and stated that the observer's accreditation should be withdrawn as they were not allowed to film in a room with ballot boxes. On 15 November, the observer's accreditation was withdrawn by the local electoral commission. Another objection by the same observer concerning the number of preliminary votes was accepted.

Students from some universities claimed that they had been forced to participate in preliminary voting, or encouraged to do so by being allowed absences from classes on Saturday and Monday. The universities denied the claims. On 15 November Belarusian State Economic University students openly protested near the campus for similar reasons, citing the recently published video with one of their instructors (curators) demanding people participate in the preliminary voting.

Election observers from the Organization for Security and Cooperation in Europe said that “fundamental freedoms were disregarded and the integrity of the election process was not adequately safeguarded". A statement from the OSCE team cited concerns including what they described as the exclusion of many opposition candidates, limited opportunity for public campaigning and shortcomings during vote counting. OSCE observer Margaret Cederfeldt said the election had demonstrated "an overall lack of respect for democratic commitments".

Election observers from the Commonwealth of Independent States described the elections as "competitive, open, free [and] transparent", adding that they considered them to be held in line with the country's Constitution and Electoral Code.

== Results ==
Only 21 of the 110 elected deputies were members of political parties, with all belonging to pro-government parties; the Communist Party of Belarus emerged as the largest party in the House of Representatives with 11 MPs, the Republican Party of Labour and Justice came second with six seats, the Belarusian Patriotic Party won two and the Agrarian Party and Liberal Democratic Party won a seat each.

Unlike in the previous elections in 2016, in which two opposition candidates were elected, the opposition did not win a single seat; the opposition United Civic Party lost its sole seat and the only pro-opposition independent MP failed to be re-elected. All 110 elected representatives were described as "loyal" to President Alexander Lukashenko. For all but one term since 2004, there have been no opposition MPs in the House of Representatives. However, since a 1996 referendum effectively concentrated all governing power in Lukashenko's hands, the House has been dominated by Lukashenko supporters even when opposition MPs have managed to get into the chamber, and the House has done little more than approve Lukashenko's policies.

44 of the 110 elected MPs were women, two were under the age of 30 and thirty were members of the previous parliament.

Party	Votes	%	Seats	+/–
Communist Party of Belarus	559,537	10.62	11	+3
Republican Party of Labour and Justice	355,971	6.75	6	+3
Liberal Democratic Party	280,683	5.33	1	0
Belarusian Social Democratic Party (Assembly)	84,790	1.61	0	0
BPF Party	82,403	1.56	0	0
Belarusian Patriotic Party	75,283	1.43	2	–1
United Civic Party	72,192	1.37	0	–1
Belarusian Agrarian Party	46,785	0.89	1	+1
Belarusian Left Party "A Just World"	37,861	0.72	0	0
Belarusian Social Democratic Assembly	23,164	0.44	0	New
Belarusian Green Party	10,592	0.20	0	0
Belarusian Social Sporting Party	7,905	0.15	0	New
Republican Party	7,529	0.14	0	New
Independents	3,178,037	60.31	89	–5
Against all	447,111	8.48	–	–
Total	5,269,843	100.00	110	0
Valid votes	5,269,843	99.07		
Invalid/blank votes	49,725	0.93		
Total votes	5,319,568	100.00		
Registered voters/turnout	6,880,605	77.31		
Source: CEC (party affiliations), CEC (votes)

=== By oblast ===
Party	Minsk	Brest	Vitebsk	Gomel	Grodno	Minsk Oblast	Mogilev
Communist Party of Belarus	106,669	34,210	40,418	161,392	22,743	111,414	82,691
Liberal Democratic Party	83,042	18,785	23,063	48,239	49,814	41,701	16,039
Republican Party of Labour and Justice	75,525	104,281	13,917	103,572	4,036	42,614	12,026
United Civic Party	15,170	3,869	5,275	15,596	14,229	5,579	12,474
Belarusian Patriotic Party	29,136	41,256	0	0	0	3,430	1,461
BPF Party	8,473	6,573	9,240	5,859	9,506	2,552	40,200
Belarusian Left Party "A Just World"	9,398	9,202	3,610	6,862	5,399	2,886	504
Belarusian Social Democratic Party (Assembly)	23,031	34,677	3,723	2,218	7,901	5,989	7,251
Belarusian Green Party	3,500	0	0	0	2,568	4,524	0
Belarusian Social Democratic Assembly	14,561	909	0	0	1,105	6,336	253
Republican Party	2,719	0	2,146	0	0	2,664	0
Belarusian Agrarian Party	0	0	0	0	0	46,785	0
Belarusian Socialist Sporting Party	7,905	0	0	0	0	0	0
Against all	77,566	73,702	51,239	64,381	56,928	77,468	45,827
Invalid/blank votes	6,182	9,482	7,933	7,870	6,725	10,286	7,429
Total	814,206	778,292	703,631	879,624	594,940	884,916	663,959

== International reaction ==
In its report following the elections, the OSCE stated that the legal framework in Belarus "does not adequately guarantee the conduct of elections in line with OSCE commitments and other international standards and obligations". As to the voting, the OSCE stated that " the lack of safeguards in election day and early voting procedures negatively impacted the integrity of the process." It also highlighted that "over 1,000 complaints and applications were filed with the election commissions, local authorities and courts, mostly related to appointment of commission members and candidate registration and deregistration".

The US State Department made a statement, referring to the decision by the OSCE: "The Office for Democratic Institutions and Human Rights (ODIHR), the Organization for Security and Cooperation in Europe (OSCE) Parliamentary Assembly, and the Council of Europe's conclusions and observations about these elections are deeply troubling. We regret that alternative voices will not be represented in parliament."

The European Union noted that the election "took place in an overall calm atmosphere" but stated that "there was an overall disregard for fundamental freedoms of assembly, association and expression".
