= BZV =

BZV or bzv may refer to:

- Belarusian Association of Military People (Biełaruskaje Zhurtavańnie Vajskoŭcaŭ), a defunct Belarusian political organization
- BZV, the IATA code for Maya-Maya Airport, Brazzaville, Republic of Congo
- bzv, the ISO 639-3 code for Bebe language, Cameroon
