= Belarusian Popular Party =

Former political party in Belarus

The Belarusian Popular Party (Belarusian: Беларуская народная партыя, Belorusskaia narodnaia partiia, BKP) was a political party in Belarus led by Victor Tereshchenko.

== History ==
Established in 1994, the party contested the 1995 parliamentary elections, winning one seat in the fourth round of voting. When the National Assembly was established in 1996, the party was not given any seats in the House of Representatives.

The party folded in 1999 after failing to re-register.
