= Belarusian Ecological Party =

Former political party in Belarus

The Belarusian Ecological Party (Belarusian: Беларуская экалягічная партыя, Belorusskaia ekologicheskaia partiia, BEP) was a political party in Belarus.

== History ==
The party contested the 1995 parliamentary elections, winning one seat in the fourth round of voting. When the National Assembly was established in 1996, the party was given one seat in the House of Representatives. However, it was closed down by the Supreme Court in 1998.
