= People's Accord Party =

Former political party in Belarus

The People's Accord Party (Belarusian: Партыя народнай згоды) was a political party in Belarus. It contested the 1995 parliamentary elections, winning eight of the 260 seats in the Supreme Soviet. When the National Assembly was established in 1996, the party was given five seats in the House of Representatives.

The party merged with Belarusian Social Democratic Assembly in 1996, forming Belarusian Social Democratic Party (People's Assembly). However, some party members were not happy with the merger and broke away to establish the Social Democratic Party of Popular Accord in 1997.
