= Sergei Syrankov =

Belarusian politician (born 1983)

First Secretary of the Communist Party
- Incumbent
- Assumed office 25 May 2024
- Preceded by: Aliaksiej Sokal

Member of the House of Representatives
- In office 17 November 2019 – 21 March 2024
- Constituency: Bykhovsky

Personal details
- Born: 14 August 1983 (age 42) Krasnapollye, Mogilev region, Byelorussian SSR, Soviet Union
- Party: Communist Party of Belarus

Sergei Alexandrovich Syrankov (Russian: Сергей Александрович Сыранков; born 14 August 1983) is a Belarusian politician serving as first secretary of the Communist Party since 2024. He previously served as second secretary and as group leader of the party in the House of Representatives. He was a candidate for president of Belarus in the 2025 presidential election, during which he publicly supported his opponent, incumbent president Alexander Lukashenko.
