= Communist Party of Belarus =

Belarusian political party

Communist Party of Belarus Коммунистическая партия Беларуси Камуністычная партыя Беларусі
- Abbreviation: CPB / КПБ
- Secretary-General: Sergei Syrankov
- Founders: Yefrem Sokolov; Viktor Chikin
- Founded: 2 November 1996; 29 years ago
- Split from: Belarusian Party of Communists
- Headquarters: 21st Building, Chicherina St, Minsk
- Newspaper: Communist Belarus
- Youth wing: Communist Youth League
- Membership (2011): 6,000
- Ideology: Communism; Marxism–Leninism; Left-conservatism; Soviet patriotism; Euroscepticism
- Political position: Far-left
- National affiliation: RKSKPPGA
- Regional affiliation: UCP–CPSU
- International affiliation: IMCWP
- Slogan: "Democracy, Justice, Socialism!" (Russian: «Народовластие, справедливость, социализм!») (Belarusian: «Народаўладдзе, справядлівасць, сацыялізм!»)
- House of Representatives: 7 / 110
- Council of the Republic: 1 / 64
- Local seats: 307 / 12,514

Party flag

Website
- comparty.by

The Communist Party of Belarus (CPB or KPB; Russian: Коммунисти́ческая па́ртия Белару́си, romanized: Kommunisticheskaya Partiya Belarusi; Belarusian: Камуністы́чная па́ртыя Белару́сі, romanized: Kamunistyčnaja Partyja Bielarusi) is a Marxist–Leninist political party in Belarus. The party was created in 1996 and supports the government of president Alexander Lukashenko. The leader of the party is Sergei Syrankov. The party has historically held more seats in the National Assembly of Belarus than any other party since the 2000 Belarusian parliamentary election, the first national election it participated in. However, until 2024, most seats in the Belarusian legislature were held by independent politicians.

== Overview ==
In 2006, the party suggested merging with the Belarusian Party of Communists (PKB), later known as the Belarusian Left Party "A Just World". While the Communist Party of Belarus is a pro-Lukashenko party, the PKB was one of the major opposition parties in Belarus. According to Sergey Kalyakin, the chairman of the PKB, the so-called "re-unification" of the two parties was a plot designed to oust the opposition PKB.

The main foreign policy goal of strengthening the party proclaimed national security through the development of Belarus-Russia Union State and the phase reconstruction voluntarily renewed Union nations, strengthening its political and economic independence.

The CPB is part of the Union of Communist Parties – Communist Party of the Soviet Union (UCP–CPSU) and the International Meeting of Communist and Workers' Parties (IMCWP); it enjoys relations with other communist parties in post-Soviet states and throughout the world to a much greater extent than the PKB, which is affiliated with the Party of the European Left and the Belarusian opposition. However, the PKB has moderated to a Left-wing populist position, albeit still holds a level of Soviet patriotism.

At the 2004 parliamentary election, the CPB obtained 5.99% and 8 out of 110 seats in the House of Representatives, 6 seats in 2008 and even less in 2012 - where it won 3 seats.

Because of the party's support for President Lukashenko, 17 of its members were appointed by him in the country's upper house, the Council of the Republic of Belarus, in 2012.

In 2014, the party increased its representation by obtaining 5 seats.

The party improved its result in the 2016 parliamentary elections, where it won 8 seats and then further increased it in the 2019 elections - where it won 11 seats.

During the 2020–21 Belarusian protests, the Communist Party of Belarus participated in a meeting in support of Alexander Lukashenko.

== Election results ==
=== Presidential elections ===
Election	Candidate	First round		Second round		Result
Election	Candidate	Votes	%	Votes	%	Result
2001	Endorsed Alexander Lukashenko	4,666,680	75.65%			Elected ✓
2006	Endorsed Alexander Lukashenko	5,501,249	82.97%			Elected ✓
2010	Endorsed Alexander Lukashenko	5,130,557	79.65%			Elected ✓
2015	Endorsed Alexander Lukashenko	5,102,478	83.47%			Elected ✓
2020	Endorsed Alexander Lukashenko	4,661,075	80.10%			Elected ✓
2025	Sergei Syrankov	189,740	3.23%			Lost ✗

=== Legislative elections ===
Election	Party leader	Performance					Rank	Government
Election	Party leader	Votes	%	± pp	Seats	+/–	Rank	Government
2000	Viktor Chikin	No data			6 / 110	New	1st	Support
2004	Tatsyana Holubeva	334,383	5.31%	New	8 / 110	▲2	1st	Support
2008	Tatsyana Holubeva	229,986	4.27%	▼1.04	6 / 110	▼2	1st	Support
2012	Tatsyana Holubeva	141,095	2.69%	▼1.58	3 / 110	▼3	1st	Support
2016	Igor Karpenko	380,770	7.40%	▲4.71	8 / 110	▲5	1st	Coalition
2019	Aliaksiej Sokal	559,537	10.62%	▲3.22	11 / 110	▲3	1st	Coalition
2024	Aliaksiej Sokal				7 / 110	▼4	▼3rd	Support

=== Party leaders ===
No.	Secretary-General	Took office	Left office
1	Viktor Chikin	2 November 1996	November 2001
2	Valery Zacharanka	November 2001	29 July 2004
3	Tatsyana Holubeva	4 March 2005	20 October 2012
4	Igor Karpenko	20 October 2012	14 May 2017
5	Aliaksiej Sokal	14 May 2017	25 May 2024
6	Sergei Syrankov	25 May 2024	Incumbent
