= Belarusian Left Party "A Just World" =

Left-wing political party in Belarus

Belarusian Left Party "A Just World" Беларуская партыя левых «Справядлівы свет»
- Leader: Sergey Kalyakin
- Founded: 7 December 1991; 34 years ago (PCB) 25 October 2009; 17 years ago (BPL)
- Banned: 29 September 2023; 3 years ago
- Preceded by: Communist Party of Byelorussia
- Headquarters: 11th building, Radialnaya St, Minsk, Belarus. 220070
- Newspaper: Novyi Tovarishch (New Comrade)
- Ideology: Left-wing nationalism Socialism; Anti-Lukashenko
- Political position: Left-wing
- National affiliation: United Democratic Forces of Belarus
- European affiliation: Party of the European Left (associated member)
- Continental affiliation: Forum of Socialists of the CIS Countries
- Colours: Red
- Anthem: "The Internationale"

Party flag

Website
- spravmir.org

The Belarusian Left Party "A Just World" (Belarusian: Беларуская партыя левых «Справядлівы свет», romanized: Biełaruskaja partyja levych "Spraviadlivy sviet") is a banned left-wing political party in Belarus that opposes the government of president Alexander Lukashenko. Until October 2009, it was known as the Belarusian Party of Communists (PCB; Belarusian: Партыя камуністаў беларуская; ПКБ, romanized: Partyja kamunistaŭ bielaruskaja; PKB, literally "Party of Communists Belarusian").

== History ==
Founded as the Belarusian Party of Communists (PСB) in 1991 as the legal successor to the ruling Communist Party of Byelorussia, the organization originally emerged as one of the major political parties in independent Belarus. With Lukashenko having become president in 1994, a split in sentiment occurred within the PBC and in 1996, a pro-Lukashenko faction of the party broke away and formed the Communist Party of Belarus.

In the 13–17 October 2004 legislative elections, the party was part of the People's Coalition 5 Plus, which did not secure any seats. These elections fell significantly short of Organization for Security and Co-operation in Europe (OSCE) standards according to OSCE's Election Observation Mission. Universal principles and constitutionally guaranteed rights of expression, association and assembly were seriously challenged, calling into question the Belarusian authorities' willingness to respect the concept of political competition on a basis of equal treatment. According to this mission, principles of an inclusive democratic process, whereby citizens have the right to seek political office without discrimination, candidates to present their views without obstruction, and voters to learn about them and discuss them freely, were largely ignored.

The party was banned for six months for paperwork irregularities on 2 August 2007.

The party has been led by Sergey Kalyakin since founding. In February 2007, Kalyakin visited the United States and met both chambers of the US Congress, Department of State officials, and representatives of non-governmental organizations in order to discuss ways in which the US could influence processes that were taking place in Belarus. In addition, Kalyakin suggested that the US, the European Union and Russia cooperate to develop a common policy regarding Belarus.

As of October 2009, the party is a member of the Party of the European Left.

In November 2009, the party was renamed to the Belarusian United Left Party "A Just World."

=== Ban ===
On 30 June 2023 it became known about the decision of the Ministry of Justice of the Republic of Belarus to refuse to re-register the party. This was followed on 29 September 2023 by the party being formally liquidated by the Supreme Court of Belarus, making it the final opposition party to be dissolved in Belarus.

== Electoral history ==
=== Presidential elections ===
Election	Candidate	First round		Second round		Result
Election	Candidate	Votes	%	Votes	%	Result
1994	Vasil Novikaŭ	253,009	4.29%			Lost ✗
2001	Sergey Kalyakin	Not admitted to the elections				
2006	Endorsed Alaksandar Milinkievič	405,486	6.12%			Lost ✗
2010	Did not contest					
2015	Sergey Kalyakin	Not admitted to the elections				
2020	Did not contest					

=== Legislative elections ===
Election	Leader	Performance					Rank	Government
Election	Leader	Votes	%	+/–	Seats	+/–	Rank	Government
1995	Sergey Kalyakin				43 / 260	New	1st	Opposition
2000	Sergey Kalyakin				0 / 110	▼43	7th	Extra-parliamentary
2004	Sergey Kalyakin	160,011	2.62% (5 Plus)	New	0 / 110	0	7th	Extra-parliamentary
2008	Sergey Kalyakin	127,429	2.37%	▼0.25	0 / 110	0	▲3rd	Extra-parliamentary
2012	Sergey Kalyakin	98,288	1.87%	▼0.50	0 / 110	0	▼5th	Extra-parliamentary
2016	Sergey Kalyakin	72,185	1.40%	▼0.37	0 / 110	0	▼7th	Extra-parliamentary
2019	Sergey Kalyakin	37,861	0.72%	▼0.68	0 / 110	0	▼9th	Extra-parliamentary
