= Civic Party (Belarus) =

Former political party in Belarus

The Civic Party (Belarusian: Грамадзянская партыя, romanized: Hramadzjanskaja partyja, GP) was a political party in Belarus.

== History ==
The party contested the 1995 parliamentary elections, winning one seat in the fourth round of voting. During the same year it merged with the United Democratic Party to form the United Civic Party of Belarus.
