= People's Coalition 5 Plus =

People's Coalition 5 Plus Народная каалица 5 Плюс Народная коалиция 5 Плюс
- Founded: 2004
- Dissolved: 2006
- Succeeded by: United Democratic Forces
- Ideology: Big tent Pro-Europeanism
- Political position: Catch-all; Left-wing to right-wing

The People's Coalition 5 Plus (Narodnaja Kaalicyja Piaciorka Plus) was a political alliance in Belarus, that opposed the regime of president Alexander Lukashenko. At the legislative elections, 13–17 October 2004, the alliance won no seats. The coalition is formed by the following parties:

- Belarusian Labour Party
- Belarusian People's Front
- Belarusian Social Democratic Party-Assembly
- Party of Communists of Belarus
- United Civil Party of Belarus

These elections fell according to the OSCE/ODIHR Election Observation Mission significantly short of OSCE commitments. Universal principles and constitutionally guaranteed rights of expression, association and assembly were seriously challenged, calling into question the Belarusian authorities' willingness to respect the concept of political competition on a basis of equal treatment. According to this mission principles of an inclusive democratic process, whereby citizens have the right to seek political office without discrimination, candidates to present their views without obstruction, and voters to learn about them and discuss them freely, were largely ignored.

This 5 Plus Coalition became the core of the wider United Democratic Forces of Belarus which in October 2005 elected Alaksandar Milinkievič as their candidate for the 2006 Presidential Election
