= Belarusian Association of Military People =

Defunct organisation of Belarusian military personnel

The Belarusian Association of Military People (Belarusian: Беларускае згуртаваньне вайскоўцаў, Łacinka: Biełaruskaje Zhurtavańnie Vajskoŭcaŭ, BZV) was an organisation of Belarusian military personnel of the late Soviet army and in the early years of the independence of Belarus.

The organisation was established in 1991, in the days of the 1991 Soviet coup d'état attempt and united pro-independence minded former Soviet officers from Belarus. BZV had its branches in several cities of Belarus: Minsk, Viciebsk, Hrodna, Mahiliou and others. In early 1990s it also had member groups outside Belarus, in Moscow, Tver and Kazakhstan. fire defense troops BZV actively cooperated with the Belarusian Popular Front, participated in the creation of legislation drafts providing the establishment of an independent Belarusian army after the dissolution of the USSR.

The organisation held several mass events in the centre of Minsk. On September 8, 1992 several dozens of acting and retired officers of the former Soviet army took official oath of allegiance to the Republic of Belarus on the Independence Square in Minsk. In 1993, the BZV organised a mass march in the streets of Minsk.

The organisation was critical of President Alexander Lukashenko and was dissolved in 2000.

== Notable members ==
- Mikalay Statkevich, leader of the BZV, future opposition politician and political prisoner
- Viktor Sheiman, future aide to president Alexander Lukashenko
