= 1995 Belarusian parliamentary election =

- 14 May 1995
- All 260 seats in the Supreme Council; 131 seats needed for a majority
Party	Leader	Seats	+/–
PCB	Sergey Kalyakin	43	New
BAP	Syamyon Sharetski	33	New
PAP	Hienadź Karpienka	8	New
UCP	Stanislaŭ Bahdankievič	5	New
BSDH	Aleh Trusaŭ	2	New
PVES		2	New
BSP	Jaŭhien Luhin	1	New
BPM	Anatoly Barankevich	1	New
RPTS	Anatol Niatylkin	1	New
BLP	Alexander Bukhvostov	1	New
BEP	Mikhail Frydliand	1	New
BPP	Victor Tereshchenko	1	New
BSSP	Vladimir Alexandrovich	1	New
BPGP	Oleg Gromyko	1	New
BSP	Michail Padhajny	1	New
CP	Jaroslav Romanchuk	1	New
Independents	–	95	+63
This lists parties that won seats. See the complete results below.
Chairmen of the Supreme Council before	Chairmen of the Supreme Council after
Myechyslaw Hryb; Independent	Syamyon Sharetski; BAP

Parliamentary elections were held in Belarus on 14 May 1995 to elect the thirteenth Supreme Council. The elections took place alongside a multi-question referendum, although several further rounds of voting were required on 28 May, 29 November and 10 December. The majority of candidates elected were independents, although 62 seats remained unfilled due to insufficient voter turnout. A total of 2,348 candidates and 22 parties contested the election, around a thousand of whom were independents. After the planned two rounds, only 119 of the 260 seats had been filled due to turnouts being too low in some areas. As this was well short of the 174 needed for a quorum, an additional two rounds were necessary. By the fourth round a quorum was reached, and although further rounds of voting were planned for 1996 to fill the remaining seats, following the constitutional amendments made following the referendum and the subsequent formation of a new National Assembly, they were not held.

Foreign observers noted that the elections were not free and fair, while others claimed it to be free but not fair due to Lukashenko's sabotage.

== Results ==
Party	First round			Second round			Third round			Fourth round			Total seats
Party	Votes	%	Seats	Votes	%	Seats	Votes	%	Seats	Votes	%	Seats	Total seats
Belarusian Party of Communists			3			24			6			10	43
Belarusian Agrarian Party			5			25			3			0	33
People's Accord Party			1			2			0			5	8
United Civic Party			0			0			1			4	5
All-Belarusian Unity and Accord Party			0			0			0			2	2
Belarusian Social Democratic Assembly			0			1			0			1	2
Belarusian Ecological Party			0			0			0			1	1
Belarusian Peasant Party			0			1			0			0	1
Belarusian Popular Party			0			0			0			1	1
Belarusian Party "The Greens"			0			1			0			0	1
Belarusian Socialist Party			0			1			0			0	1
Belarusian Social Sporting Party			0			0			0			1	1
Republican Party of Labour and Justice			0			1			0			0	1
Belarusian Patriotic Movement			0			1			0			0	1
Belarusian Labour Party			0			0			0			1	1
Civic Party			0			0			0			1	1
Belarusian Popular Front			0			0			0			0	0
Belarusian Christian Democratic Union			0			0			0			0	0
Slavic Council			0			0			0			0	0
Beer Lovers Party			0			0			0			0	0
Belarusian National Party			0			0			0			0	0
Liberal Democratic Party			0			0			0			0	0
Belarusian Women's Party "Nadzieja"			0			0			0			0	0
National Democratic Party of Belarus			0			0			0			0	0
Belarusian Scientific-Industrian Congress			0			0			0			0	0
Common Sense Party			0			0			0			0	0
Republican Party			0			0			0			0	0
Independents			9			44			10			32	95
Vacant													62
Total			18			101			20			59	260
Valid votes	4,821,199	–		3,471,635	–		2,550,608	–		1,856,738	–		
Registered voters/turnout	7,445,820			6,138,046			4,154,589			3,545,077			
Source: Nohlen & Stöver

== Aftermath ==
Following the elections, the MPs from the Belarusian Socialist Party, the Belarusian Labour Party and the Civic Party joined the United Civic Party of Belarus, together with one MP who defected from the Belarusian Party of Communists.
