= Mikola Statkevich =

Belarusian lieutenant colonel, politician, & pro-democracy activist (born 1956)

- Мікола Статкевіч
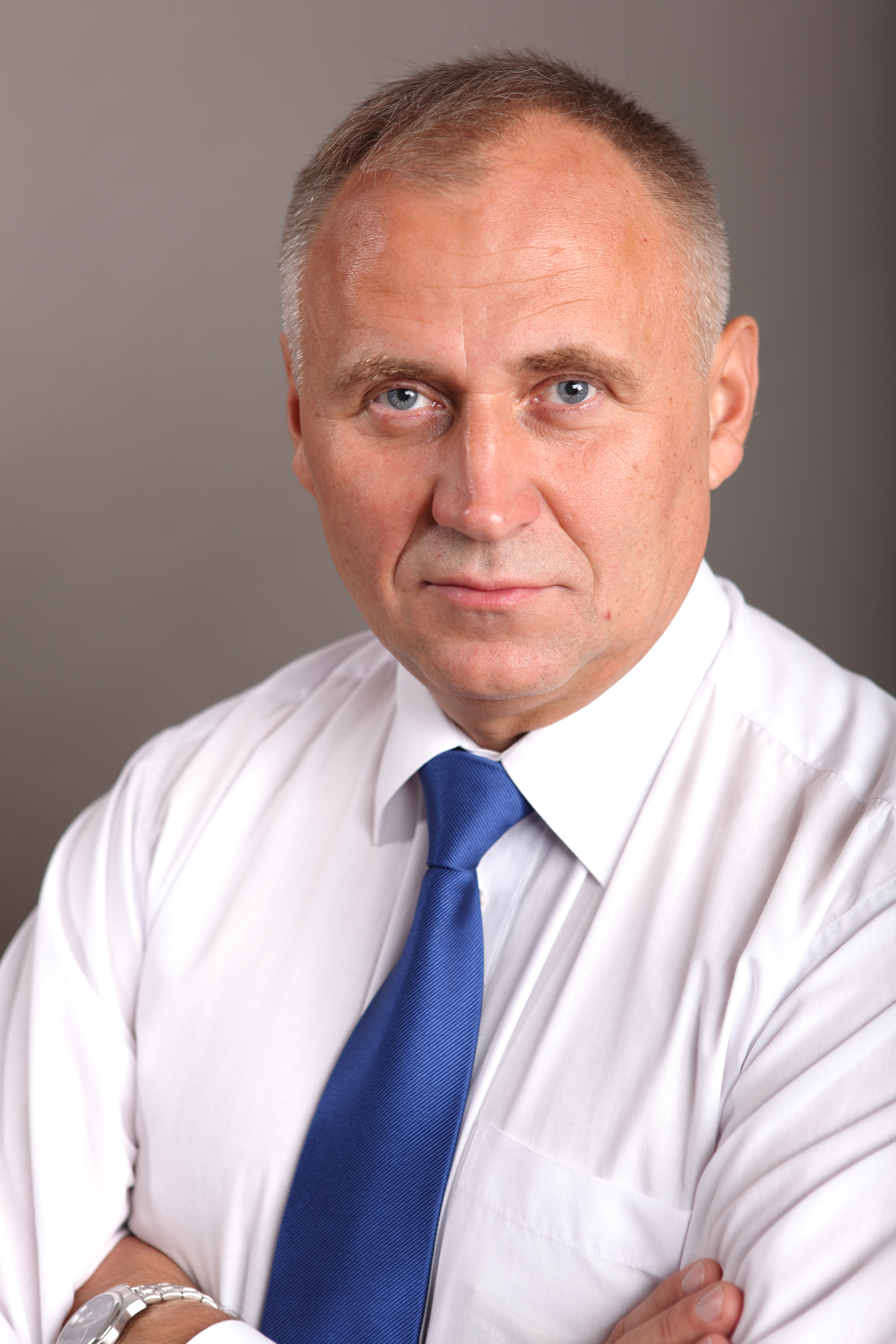
- Statkevich in 2010

Leader of the Belarusian Social Democratic Party (People's Assembly)
- Incumbent
- Assumed office 29 June 1996
- Preceded by: Office established

Personal details
- Born: 12 August 1956 (age 70) Liadna, Byelorussian SSR, Soviet Union (now Belarus)
- Party: Belarusian Social Democratic Party (People's Assembly)
- Other political affiliations: Communist Party of the Soviet Union (until 1991)
- Education: Minsk Higher Military Engineering School
- Website: statkevich.org

Military service
- Allegiance: Soviet Union
- Branch/service: Soviet Air Defence Forces
- Years of service: 1973–1982
- Rank: Lieutenant colonel

Mikola (Note: Also written as Mikalay (Belarusian: Мікалай).) Viktaravich Statkevich (Belarusian: Мікола Віктаравіч Статкевіч, Russian: Николай Викторович Статкевич, romanized: Nikolai Viktorovich Statkevich; born 12 August 1956) is a Belarusian politician, and opposition leader who was a presidential candidate at the 2010 Belarusian presidential election. Since 31 May 2020 he was held in prison by Belarusian authorities. Viasna Human Rights Centre recognized him as a political prisoner. On 14 December 2021, Statkevich was sentenced to 14 years in prison. He was released on 11 September 2025 as part of a deal between the Belarusian government and the United States, but he refused to be deported to Lithuania and was returned to the penal colony. Following a stroke, he was again released on 19 February 2026.

== Early life and career ==
Mikola Viktaravich Statkevich was born in Liadna near Slutsk into a family of school teachers. He is a member of the Statkiewicz noble family (of the Kościesza coat of arms), and is additionally a member of the Wołodkowicz noble family through his mother.

During the German occupation of Belarus in World War II, his father (Viktar Paulavich Statkevich) and grandfather (Paul Statkevich) participated in the Belarusian partisan movement, engaging in sabotage against German authorities. His grandfather was executed in 1944 by the German occupational authorities for his partisan activities. Viktar, despite having been shot by a German soldier, survived the war and lives in the city of Baranavichy, where he is popular among the city's population and recognised by the local Belarusian opposition yearly on Victory Day. His maternal grandfather, Symon Harabiets, was a member of the Communist Party of Western Belorussia who fled Polish political repression for the Soviet Union and was later executed during Soviet repressions in Belarus.

== Military career ==
In 1978, Statkevich graduated from the Minsk Higher Military Engineering School and served as a member of the Soviet Air Defence Forces in the Murmansk Oblast of the Russian Soviet Federative Socialist Republic, where he was recognised for his capability among his unit, responsible for air defence within the entire Russian Far North. He left active military service in 1982, at the rank of lieutenant colonel, to return to the Higher Military Engineering School, where he defended his thesis and became a teacher under the Ministries of Education and Culture. Statkevich has published over 60 scientific works, focusing on, among other things, ergonomics, engineering psychology, and social psychology.

In the early 1990s, Statkevich was one of the leaders of the Belarusian Militarymen Association, a pro-independence union of Soviet officers from Belarus. In 1991 Statkevich left the Communist Party of the Soviet Union as a protest against the January Events, a crackdown by the Soviet military on democratic activists in Lithuania.

== Political career ==
In 1993 Statkevich was actively protesting against Belarus joining a collective defence treaty with Azerbaijan and Armenia that were at war at a time, to prevent Belarusian soldiers serving in military conflicts outside the country. For this Statkevich has been dismissed from the army shortly before the scheduled presentation of his Doctor of Science dissertation. He then became one of the leaders of the Belarusian Social Democratic Party (People's Assembly), including the party's chairman since 1995.

Statkevich was one of the leaders of the 1999 Freedom March against the Union State.

In 2005 Statkevich was sentenced to three years of labour for organising mass protests against the 2004 referendum in Belarus that has lifted the constitutional limit on presidential terms and allowed president Alexander Lukashenko to again participate in presidential elections. Amnesty International declared Mikola Statkevich a prisoner of conscience. He was then set free in 2007 following an amnesty.

Statkevich was subject to a three-day enforced disappearance on 25 March 2017, during widespread protests that occurred during the same year. Following his release, he said to Radio Free Europe/Radio Liberty reporters that he had been located at a KGB prison and subject to interrogation. The KGB denied that this was the case, claiming that it had never taken Statkevich into custody.

Statkevich was one of many democratic candidates who ran in the 2010 Belarusian presidential election. After a crackdown on opposition demonstrations, he was arrested and imprisoned. On 26 May 2011, he was sentenced to 6 years in a medium security penal colony. Amnesty International reported in July 2012 that Statkevich had been moved to a "punishment cell" after refusing to sign a confession. He was later released from imprisonment but disappeared in early 2017 after announcing a planned demonstration in central Minsk. He was again released by authorities after they violently suppressed the rally.

On 31 May 2020, he was arrested on his way to a rally where signatures for Sviatlana Tsikhanouskaya were being gathered. He was sentenced to 15 days for participating in an unsanctioned protest. This sentence was extended two more times, and he was tried again on 29 June for organizing unrest. Viasna Human Rights Centre called the accusations politically motivated and demanded the immediate release of Statkevich.

On 14 December 2021, Statkevich was sentenced to 14 years in prison and sent to Penal Colony 13 in the town of Hlybokaye. Along with him, Ihar Losik, Sergei Tikhanovsky and three other political prisoners were also sentenced. Throughout the 565 days he has spent in detention, Statkevich was not allowed to get access to legal representation or defence and he has been denied all contact with his family.

Statkevich was admitted to the prison hospital of Penal Colony 13 in November 2022 after falling ill with pneumonia. His family was barred from delivering personal items to him, including winter clothes.

=== Disappearance ===
Statkevich disappeared from prison on 9 February 2023, after sending a letter to his wife. Statkevich was later followed by Ihar Losik and Viktar Babaryka, who both also disappeared from prison. His lawyers have also been barred from reaching him, with authorities claiming that he had not applied for legal assistance. A report by rapporteurs of the Office of the United Nations High Commissioner for Human Rights said that Statkevich's disappearance from prison was "potentially" an enforced disappearance. Belarusian pro-democracy website Charter 97 blamed the Belarusian government for Statkevich's disappearance.

According to the OHCHR reporters, "multiple sources" have claimed that Statkevich's disappearance is a cover-up for his death. These reports have circulated since late November 2023. Natalya Radina, editor-in-chief of Charter 97, has called on the Belarusian government to allow Statkevich access to his wife to confirm that he is alive. In a 14 December 2023 resolution, the European Parliament condemned Statkevich's disappearance and called on the government to immediately and unconditionally release Statkevich alongside the 1,500 other political prisoners.

=== Release and rearrest ===
Statkevich was released from prison and deported to Lithuania on 11 September 2025, following a meeting between John Coale, representing U.S. President Donald Trump, and Lukashenko. Upon arriving at the border, he refused to leave Belarus. For a while, he remained in the no man's land, but then Belarusian security operatives took him in the direction of the Belarusian border crossing and, according to the unnamed "credible sources", he was returned to the penal colony at Hlybokaye. Lukashenka confirmed that Statkevich was brought back to prison. Statkevich was again released and sent home on 19 February 2026 after suffering a stroke a month earlier.

== Awards and recognition ==
In December 2020, Statkevich was named among the representatives of the democratic Belarusian opposition, honored with the Sakharov Prize by the European Parliament.
