= 2004 Belarusian parliamentary election =

- 17 October 2004 (first round); 27 October 2004 (second round); 20 March 2005 (third round)
- All 110 seats in the House of Representatives; 56 seats needed for a majority
- Turnout: 90.14%
Party	Leader	Vote %	Seats	+/–
CPB	Tatsyana Holubeva	5.49	8	+2
BAP	Mikhail Shimansky	2.38	3	−2
LDPB	Sergei Gaidukevich	2.01	1	0
Independents	–	76.16	98	+4
This lists parties that won seats. See the complete results below.
Speaker of the House of Representatives before	Speaker of the House of Representatives after
Vadim Popov; Independent	Vladimir Konoplev; Independent

Parliamentary elections were held in Belarus on 17 October 2004, with a second round of voting in two constituencies on 27 October, and a third round in one on 20 March 2005. The vast majority of successful candidates, 98 of 110, were independents. Voter turnout was reported to be 90% in the first round.

A total of 359 candidates contested the election, with opposing parties claiming that around 40% of their candidates were not registered. The OCSE delegation noted that although all candidates were given a set amount of free television and radio airtime and a free statement in the national press, over 80% of television news time was dedicated to President Alexander Lukashenko in the five weeks before the election. They also noted concerns about the independence of the Electoral Commission and a lack of transparency during the voting and counting process. The government also closed down nine independent newspapers in the lead-up to the elections.

== Results ==
Party or alliance		First round			Second round			Third round			Total seats	+/–
Party or alliance		Votes	%	Seats	Votes	%	Seats	Votes	%	Seats	Total seats	+/–
People's; Coalition; 5 Plus	United Civic Party	207,664	3.41	0							0	New
People's; Coalition; 5 Plus	Party of Communists of Belarus	151,602	2.49	0							0	0
People's; Coalition; 5 Plus	Belarusian Social Democratic Assembly	59,892	0.98	0							0	New
People's; Coalition; 5 Plus	Total	419,158	6.88	0							0	0
Communist Party of Belarus		334,383	5.49	8							8	+2
BPF Party		205,387	3.37	0						0	0	New
Belarusian Social Democratic Party (People's Assembly)		176,032	2.89	0						0	0	0
Belarusian Agrarian Party		145,004	2.38	3							3	–2
Liberal Democratic Party of Belarus		122,605	2.01	1							1	0
Republican Party		28,179	0.46	0							0	0
Social Democratic Party of Popular Accord		22,441	0.37	0							0	–1
Independents		4,642,949	76.16	96			1			1	98	+4
Total		6,096,138	100.00	108			1			1	110	0
Valid votes		6,096,138	96.80									
Invalid/blank votes		201,462	3.20									
Total votes		6,297,600	100.00									
Registered voters/turnout		6,986,163	90.14									
Source: Nohlen, IPU, CEC
