= 2000 Belarusian parliamentary election =

← 1995	15 October 2000	2004 →
- All 110 seats in the House of Representatives; 56 seats needed for a majority
- Turnout: 61.08%
Party	Leader	Seats	+/–
CPB	Viktor Chikin	6	New
BAP	Mikhail Shimansky	5	−28
RPTS	Anatol Niatylkin	2	+1
BSSP	Vladimir Alexandrovich	1	0
LDPB	Sergei Gaidukevich	1	0
SDPNZ	Leonid Sechka	1	New
Independents	–	94	−1
This lists parties that won seats. See the complete results below.
Speaker of the House of Representatives before	Speaker of the House of Representatives after
Anatoly Malofeyev; Independent	Vadim Popov; Independent

Parliamentary elections were held in Belarus on 15 October 2000, with further rounds of voting on 29 October, 18 March and 1 April. The vast majority of successful candidates, 94 of 110, were independents. Voter turnout was reported to be 61.08% in the first round.

A total of 566 candidates contested the election, only around fifty of which were opponents of President Alexander Lukashenko. Opposition parties called for a boycott, criticising the government's control of the state media. In response, the Department of Justice stated that anyone calling for a boycott could receive a jail sentence of up to two years, and several activists were detained. Although a Russian delegation claimed the elections were free and fair, other international observers disagreed, noting concerns about the treatment of opposition candidates, a possible inflation of voter turnout and falsified and destroyed ballot papers.

== Results ==
Party	First round			Second round			Third round			Fourth round			Total seats	+/–
Party	Votes	%	Seats	Votes	%	Seats	Votes	%	Seats	Votes	%	Seats	Total seats	+/–
Communist Party of Belarus			2			4			0			0	6	New
Belarusian Agrarian Party			4			1			0			0	5	–28
Republican Party of Labour and Justice			0			2			0			0	2	+1
Belarusian Social Sporting Party			1			0			0			0	1	0
Liberal Democratic Party of Belarus			0			1			0			0	1	+1
Social Democratic Party of Popular Accord			1			0			0			0	1	New
Party of Belarusian Communists			0			0			0			0	0	–42
Belarusian Social Democratic Party (People's Assembly)			0			0			0			0	0	New
Republican Party			0			0			0			0	0	0
Independents			33			48			2			11	94	–1
Total			41			56			2			11	110	–88
Total votes	4,430,878	–		3,703,345	–		588,595	–		373,366	–			
Registered voters/turnout	7,254,752	61.08		3,703,345	51.78		810,502	72.62		677,903	55.08			
Source: Nohlen & Stöver, IPU
