= 2015 Belarusian presidential election =

Presidential election in Belarus

- 11 October 2015
- Registered: 7,008,682
- Turnout: 87.22% (▼3.43 pp)
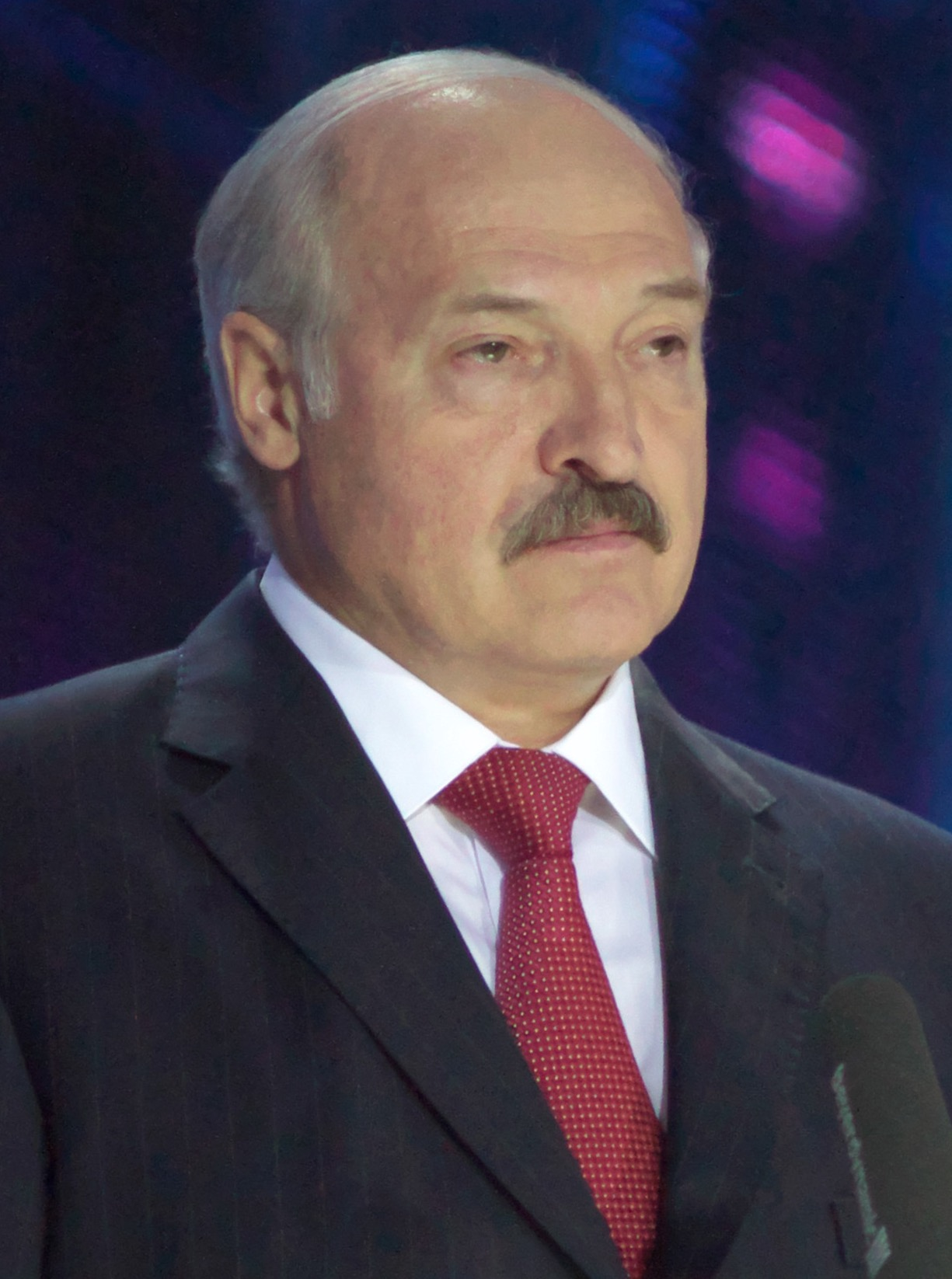

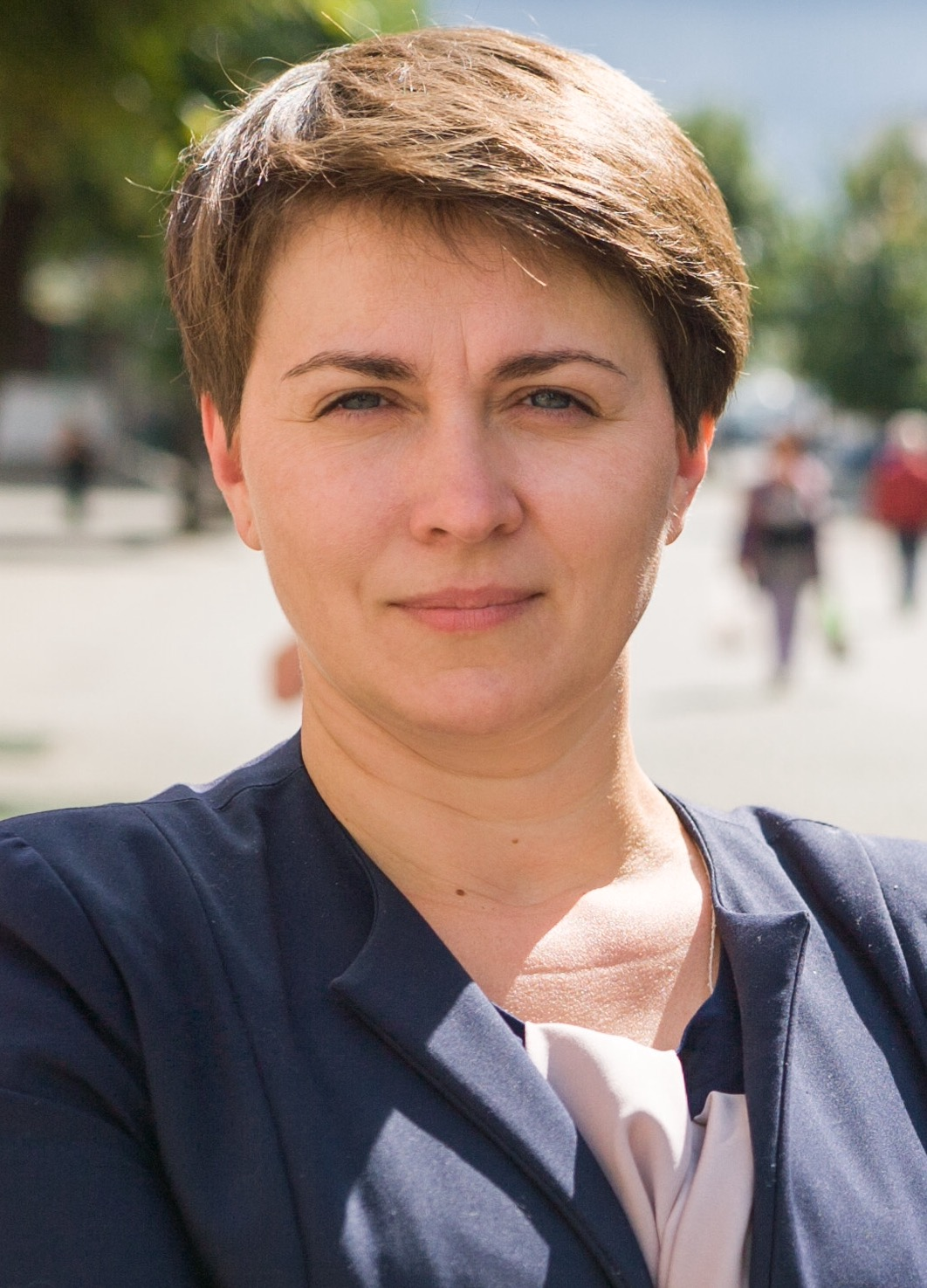
Nominee	Alexander Lukashenko	Tatsyana Karatkyevich
Party	Independent	BSDP(A)
Alliance	Belaya Rus	People's Referendum
Popular vote	5,102,478	271,426
Percentage	84.14%	4.48%
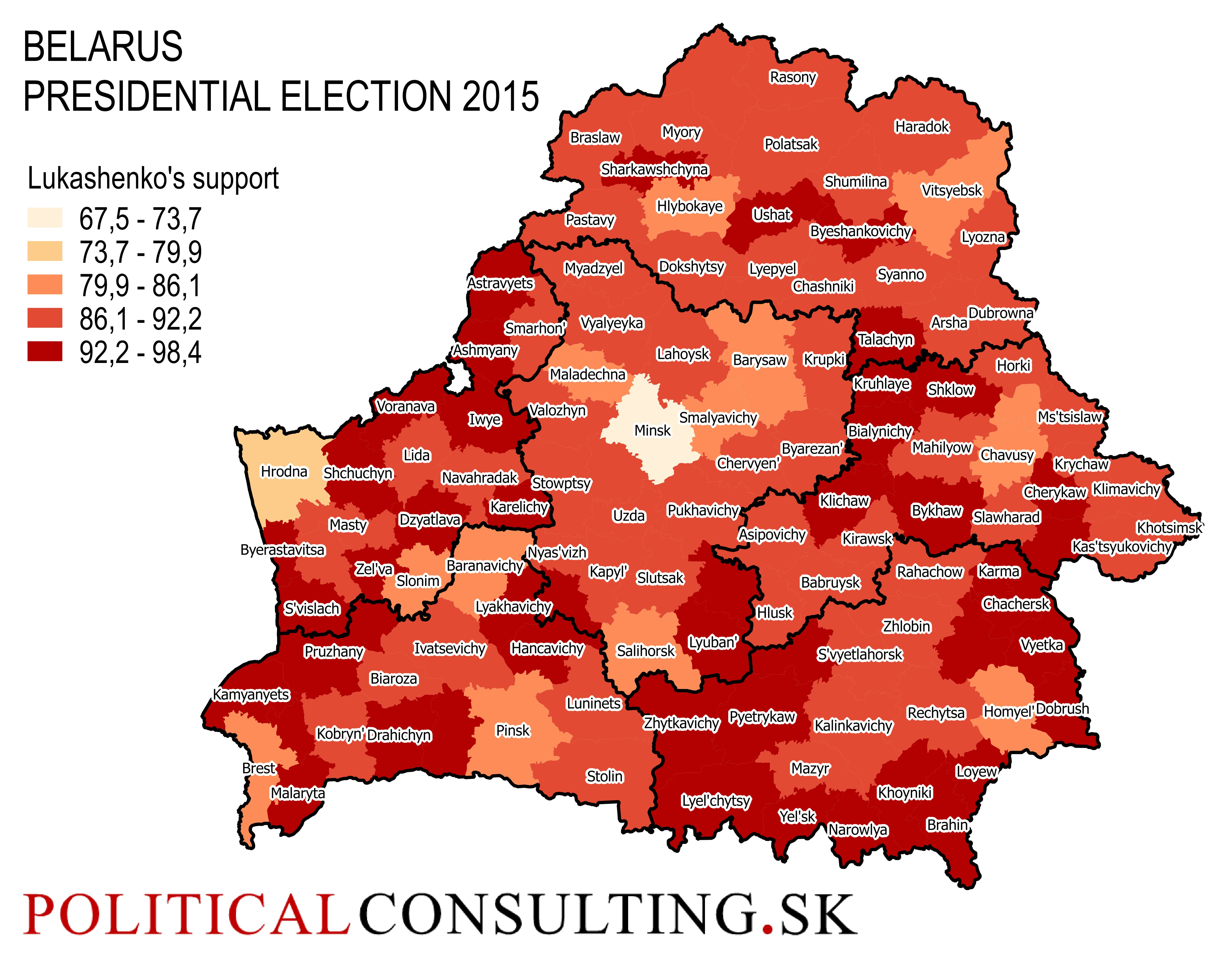
President before election
Alexander Lukashenko
Independent
Elected President
Alexander Lukashenko
Independent

Presidential elections were held in Belarus on 11 October 2015. Long-term president Alexander Lukashenko ran for his fifth term in office, having won every presidential election since independence in 1991. He was re-elected with 84% of the vote, according to official figures. The 'against all' option received more votes than any opposition candidate.

As with previous elections in Belarus, the 2015 election was not democratic. In a report following the election, Miklós Haraszti, the United Nations Special Rapporteur on human rights in Belarus, determined that the results were not free and fair and that "the election process was orchestrated, and the result was pre-ordained", given extensive limits on civil and political rights in Belarus and a high level of election-day fraud.

== Background ==
Prior to the vote, six incarcerated opposition figures were pardoned by Lukashenko. The move was welcomed by the OSCE electoral observer mission with the head of the delegation, Kent Härstedt, saying: "The recent release of political prisoners and a welcoming approach to observers were positive developments. However, the hope that this gave us for broader electoral progress was largely unfulfilled." The International Federation for Human Rights reported that it is likely that released political prisoners in Belarus still have many rights curtailed, such as inability to work for the government or run for public office, police visitations, and restriction of travel. Fewer protests occurred during this presidential election than during others, mostly due to unease over the Maidan protests in Ukraine two years prior. The government of Belarus exploited this unease by advocating stability over change, and even opposition leaders opposed protests.

== Electoral system ==
The president of Belarus is elected using the two-round system. If no candidate obtains over 50% of the vote, a second round is held with the top two candidates. The winner of the second round is elected. A turnout quorum of 50% is applied.

== Candidates ==
A total of eight candidates attempted to register to run in the elections by collecting the required 100,000 signatures; incumbent President Alexander Lukashenko running as an independent, Belarusian Left Party "A Just World" chairman Sergey Kalyakin, Liberal Democratic Party chairman Sergei Gaidukevich, People's referendum member Tatsyana Karatkyevich, United Civic Party chairman Anatoly Lebedko, economist Viktor Tereshchenko (who ran in the 2010 elections), unemployed teacher Zhanna Romanovskaya and Belarusian Patriotic Party chairman Nikolai Ulakhovich.

Although five candidates (Lukashenko, Ulakhovich, Gaidukevich, Tereshchenko and Karatkyevich) obtained over 100,000 signatures, the vast majority of Tereshchenko's signatures were declared invalid, resulting in only four candidates (marked in bold) being able to contest the elections. Of the four candidates, only one genuine opposition candidate was permitted to run; the others were considered pro-government candidates.

Candidate	Political party	Initiative group		Submitted	Valid
Candidate	Political party	Members	Leader	Submitted	Valid
**Alexander Lukashenko**	Independent	10,577	Mikhail Orda	1,761,145	1,753,380
**Nikolai Ulakhovich**	Belarusian Patriotic Party	1,426	Mikhail Vobrazaw	159,805	149,819
**Sergei Gaidukevich**	Liberal Democratic Party	2,481	Anatoly Khishchanka	140,735	139,877
**Tatsyana Karatkyevich**	People's Referendum	1,993	Andrei Dmitriev	107,299	105,278
Viktor Tereshchenko	Independent	946	Oleg Nestsyarkov	130,404	6,699
Sergey Kalyakin	Belarusian Left Party "A Just World"	1,510	Valery Ukhnaliou	48	0
Anatoly Lebedko	United Civic Party	977	Viktor Kornienko	–	0
Zhanna Romanovskaya	Independent	110	Eugene Naporko	780	0
Sources: Nasha Niva, CEC, Belta

=== Party system ===
Unlike in other nations, Belarusian political parties do not hold very significant influence in parliament or in elections. For instance, Lukashenko himself runs as an independent instead of representing a political party. Opposition parties are allowed to exist, but only in a nominal sense as they hold virtually no power in government. Tatsiana Karatkevich represented the "People's Referendum" in the 2015 election, which is an initiative created by a coalition of various opposition leaders instead of a political party.

== Campaign ==
The government allowed an unauthorized opposition rally in the capital, Minsk, to go ahead on the eve of the election without police intervention but Lukashenko warned that post-election protests would not be tolerated. On the same day, the winner of the 2015 Nobel Prize in Literature (announced just two days prior), Svetlana Alexievich, warned Europe to beware of Lukashenko's government as an alleged "soft dictatorship."

Amid a declining economy (including devaluation of the rubel and a reduction in exports to Russia), Lukashenko changed his election slogan from an economic one ("For a prosperous and strong Belarus" was used in the 2010 campaign) to an independent-focused one ("For the Future of Independent Belarus").

== Opinion polls ==
Date	Agency	Lukashenko	Karatkyevich	Statkevich	Nyaklyaeu	Lebedko	Gaydukevich	Kalyakin	Ulakhovich
31 March 2015	NISEPI	34.2%	–	4.5%	7.6%	2.9%	1.1%	1.6%	–
1 July 2015	NISEPI	38.6%	1.1%	5%	4.7%	4.2%	3.9%	3.1%	-
30 September 2015	NISEPI	47%	17.9%	-	-	-	11.4%	-	3.6%

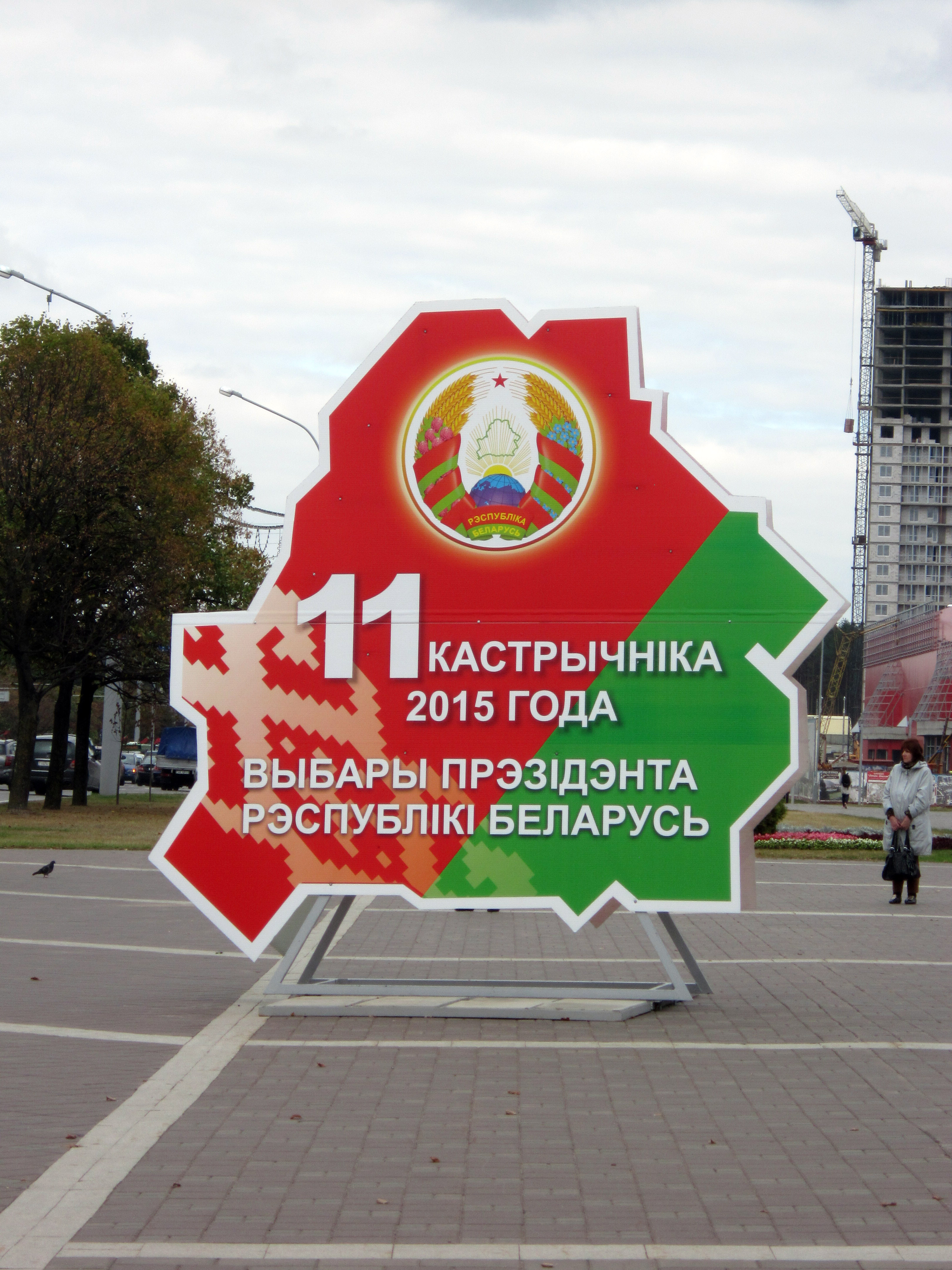
Belarusian presidential election banner

== Conduct ==
As with previous elections in Belarus, the 2015 election took place in an authoritarian environment. Like previous elections in post-Soviet Belarus, the 2015 election was marked by an increase in the degree of election fraud and unfairness that inflated Lukashenko's margin of victory, although Lukashenko might have been able to obtain a majority even without vote-rigging.

Miklós Haraszti, the United Nations Special Rapporteur on human rights in Belarus, said that while the elections took place without violence (unlike the 2010 elections) the election did not satisfy the right of Belarusians to free and fair election: "The election process was orchestrated, and the result was pre-ordained. It could not be otherwise, given the 20 years of continuous suppression of the rights to freedom of expression, assembly, and association, which are the preconditions for any credible competition." Haraszti also noted a high level of election-day fraud (including "undocumented handling of voter lists and ballots, voting on behalf of others, carrousel voting, ballot stuffing, voting without proper documents, and mobile voting abuses") and stated that the voter turnout and vote totals for Lukashenko were implausibly high and not credible.

The OSCE Office for Democratic Institutions and Human Rights (ODIHR) long-term observation mission was led by Jacques Faure and included more than 40 observers; the short-term observation mission had over 400 people. The OSCE's Kent Härstedt suggested the vote may have been undermined by "significant problems," especially during the counting of the votes: "It is clear that Belarus still has a long way to go towards fulfilling its democratic commitments."

Multiple days of "coerced participation of prison inmates, army conscripts, and public servants" were documented, and the Viasna human rights group documented cases of forced early voting among students of state universities and workers of state organizations. The "Human Rights Defenders for Free Elections" group also registered the overestimation of turnout (half of independent observers noted that the actual number of early voters didn't match with the official turnout) and unreasonable interference in observers' work.

On election day, independent observers noted several violations during the elections. In Barysaw, chairman of the District Election Commission didn't announce the results before calling somewhere (presumably the higher-level electoral commission). After his call, the observer states, the number of votes for the opposition candidate Karatkevich in the final protocol decreased from 219 to 77. In Salihorsk polling station 24, the number of voters was announced to be 1,190, while the independent observer counted only 808 people. A similar incident happened in Babruysk, where the official turnout on three polling stations differed from the observers' calculations by several hundred voters in each station. The observer was not allowed to watch the counting process.

In Slonim, an independent observer noticed two packs of filled ballots thrown into the early voting ballot box.

== Results ==
According to the Central Election Commission, more than 36% of voters used the early voting process, higher than in previous years. Overall turnout was 87.22% – highest in Vitebsk Region at 91.08% and lowest in Minsk at 74.38%. Alexander Lukashenko won the election with 83.47% of the vote.

Candidate	Party	Votes	%
Alexander Lukashenko	Independent	5,102,478	84.14
Tatsyana Karatkyevich	People's Referendum	271,426	4.48
Sergei Gaidukevich	Liberal Democratic Party	201,945	3.33
Nikolai Ulakhovich	Belarusian Patriotic Party	102,131	1.68
Against all		386,225	6.37
Total		6,064,205	100.00
Valid votes		6,064,205	99.20
Invalid/blank votes		48,808	0.80
Total votes		6,113,013	100.00
Registered voters/turnout		7,008,682	87.22
Source: Belta

== Reactions ==
=== Domestic ===
Head of the Central Election Commission, Lidia Yermoshina stated that "the election campaign was civilized, cultured and calm."

Opposition leaders Uladzimir Nyaklyayew, Anatoly Lebedko and Mikola Statkevich said they would not recognize the results.

=== International ===
Germany – Foreign Minister Frank-Walter Steinmeier said from Luxembourg that the lack of repression against the opposition could pave the path towards easing sanctions against the country for four months. "There have been changes in Belarus, compared to the two past elections. If Belarus stays on this path, there is a willingness, and there is unanimity on this, to change the relationships with Belarus." However, he added that though there were few surprises, Belarus was changing, especially in regards to the "liberation of political prisoners" before the vote.

France – Minister for European Affairs Harlem Désir said his country sought to encourage an opening, while also warning that backsliding on human rights could result in the re-imposition of sanctions.

=== Analysis ===
An analyst at the BelaPAN Alexander Klaskovsky noticed that there were no mass protests and arrests of the opposition place this time. A comment by Agence France Presse suggested the changes in this election were due to Lukashenko's shrewdness in playing Western Europe against Russia and an attempt to decouple from Russia due to international sanctions it faced.
