= Social Democratic Party of Popular Accord =

Banned political party in Belarus

Social Democratic Party of Popular Accord Сацыял-дэмакратычная партыя Народнай Згоды
- Leader: Siarhiej Jermak
- Founded: 1997; 29 years ago
- Banned: 9 August 2023; 2 years ago
- Split from: People's Accord Party
- Headquarters: Minsk, st. K. Marksa, 10
- Membership: 2,881
- Ideology: Social democracy Pro-Lukashenko
- Political position: Centre-left

The Social Democratic Party of Popular Accord (Belarusian: Сацыял-дэмакратычная партыя Народнай Згоды, romanized: Sacyjał-demakratyčnaja partyja Narodnaj Zhody) was a political party in Belarus. It was created in 1997, and was led by Siarhiej Jermak. It supported the government of president Alexander Lukashenko.

The Social Democratic Party of Popular Accord considered itself the successor of the People's Accord Party (PAP).

The party has stated its commitment to a social market economy according to the formula: "the market - as far as possible, government regulation - as far as necessary." Such a model aims to cut off the most negative features of a market economy.

The party's only seat won in a Belarusian legislative election was in 2000.

In the 2018 elections to local councils of deputies, 11 representatives were elected from the party.

In the 2019 Belarusian parliamentary election, the party did not nominate candidates on party lists, and 1 representative of the party was nominated through the collection of signatures.

On 9 August 2023, the Social Democratic Party of Popular Accord was liquidated by the Supreme Court of Belarus.
