= 2016 Belarusian parliamentary election =

- 11 September 2016
- All 110 seats in the House of Representatives; 56 seats needed for a majority
- Turnout: 74.68% (▲0.07pp)
Party	Leader	Vote %	Seats	+/–
CPB	Igor Karpenko	7.40	8	+5
LDPB	Sergei Gaidukevich	4.24	1	+1
RPTS	Vasil Zadnyaprany	2.87	3	+2
UCP	Anatoly Lebedko	2.16	1	+1
BPP	Nikolai Ulakhovich	2.16	3	+3
Independents	–	67.01	94	−9
This lists parties that won seats. See the complete results below.
Results by constituency
Speaker of the House of Representatives before	Speaker of the House of Representatives after
Vladimir Andreichenko; CPB	Vladimir Andreichenko; CPB

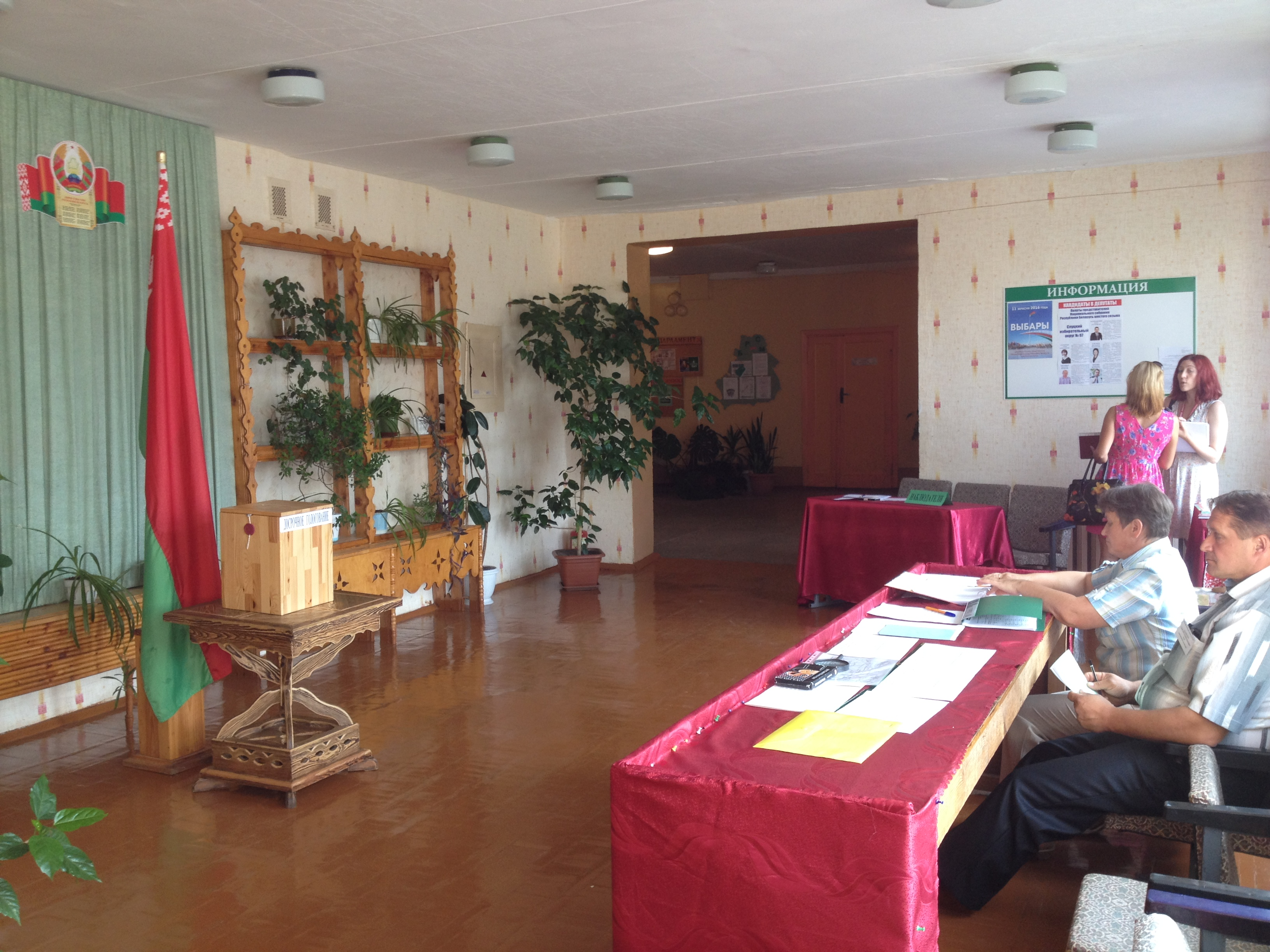
Polling station in Povstyn

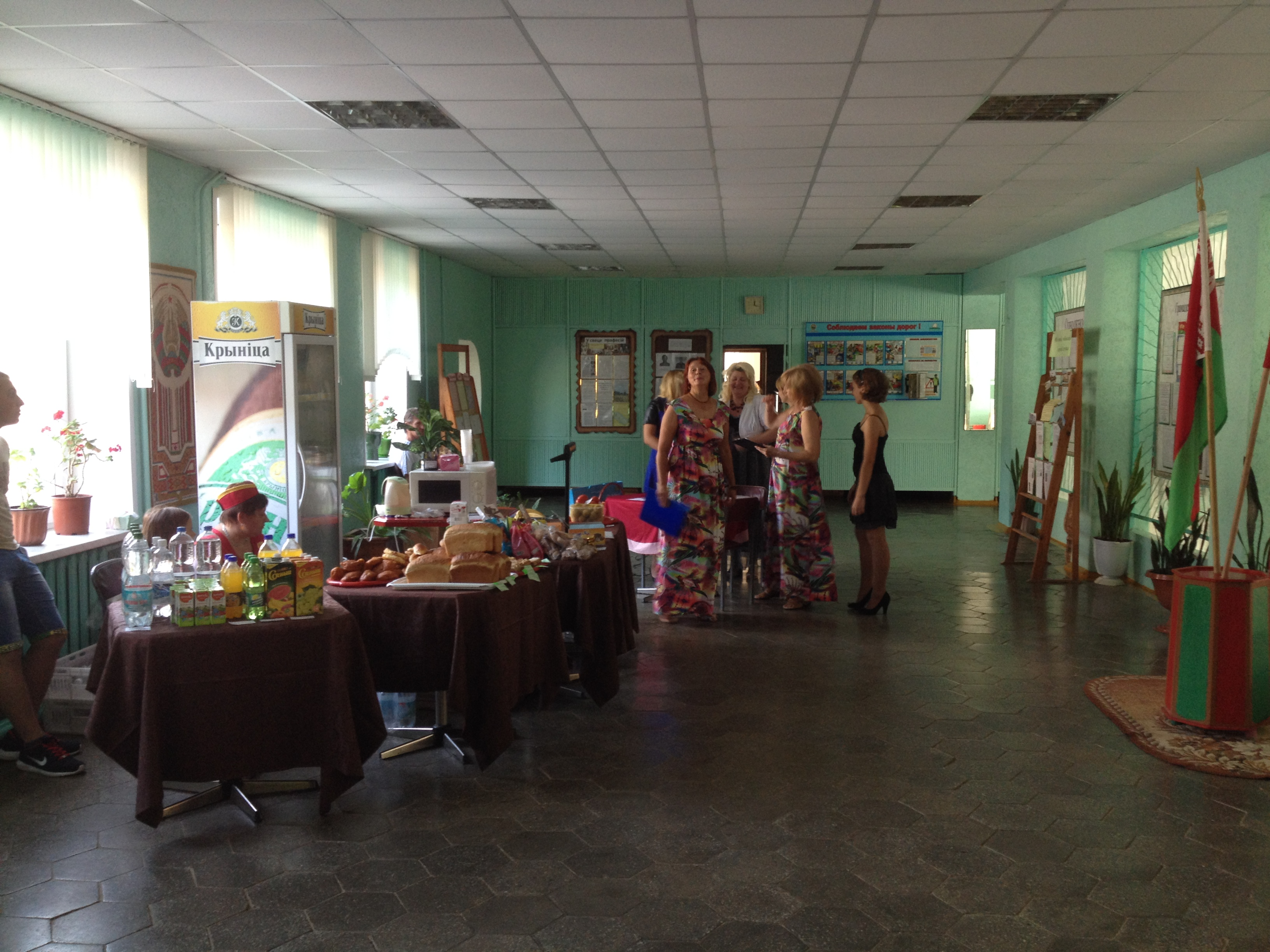
Women singing near polling station in Veseia

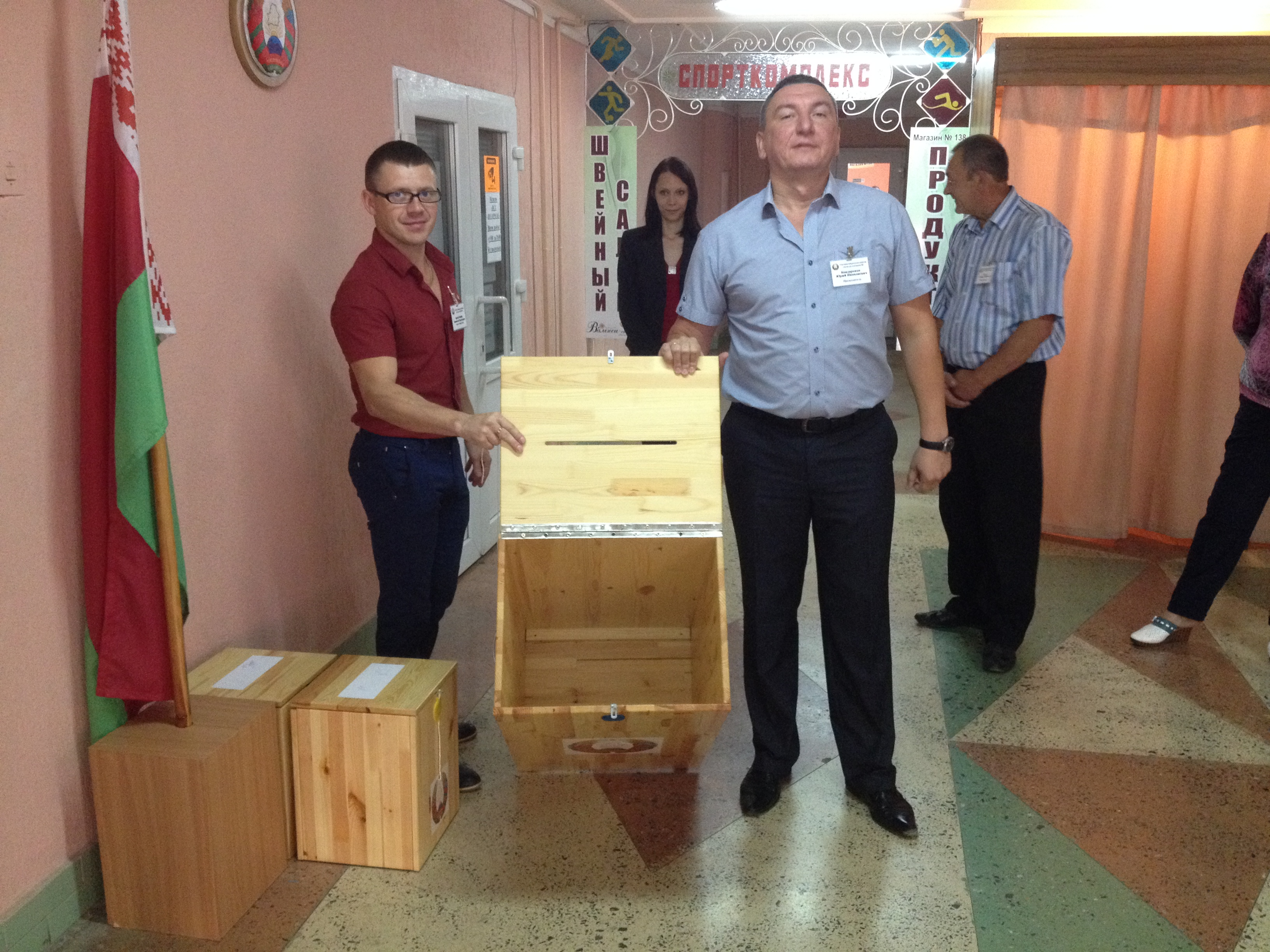
Members of a commission showing empty ballot box before its closure, Slutsk

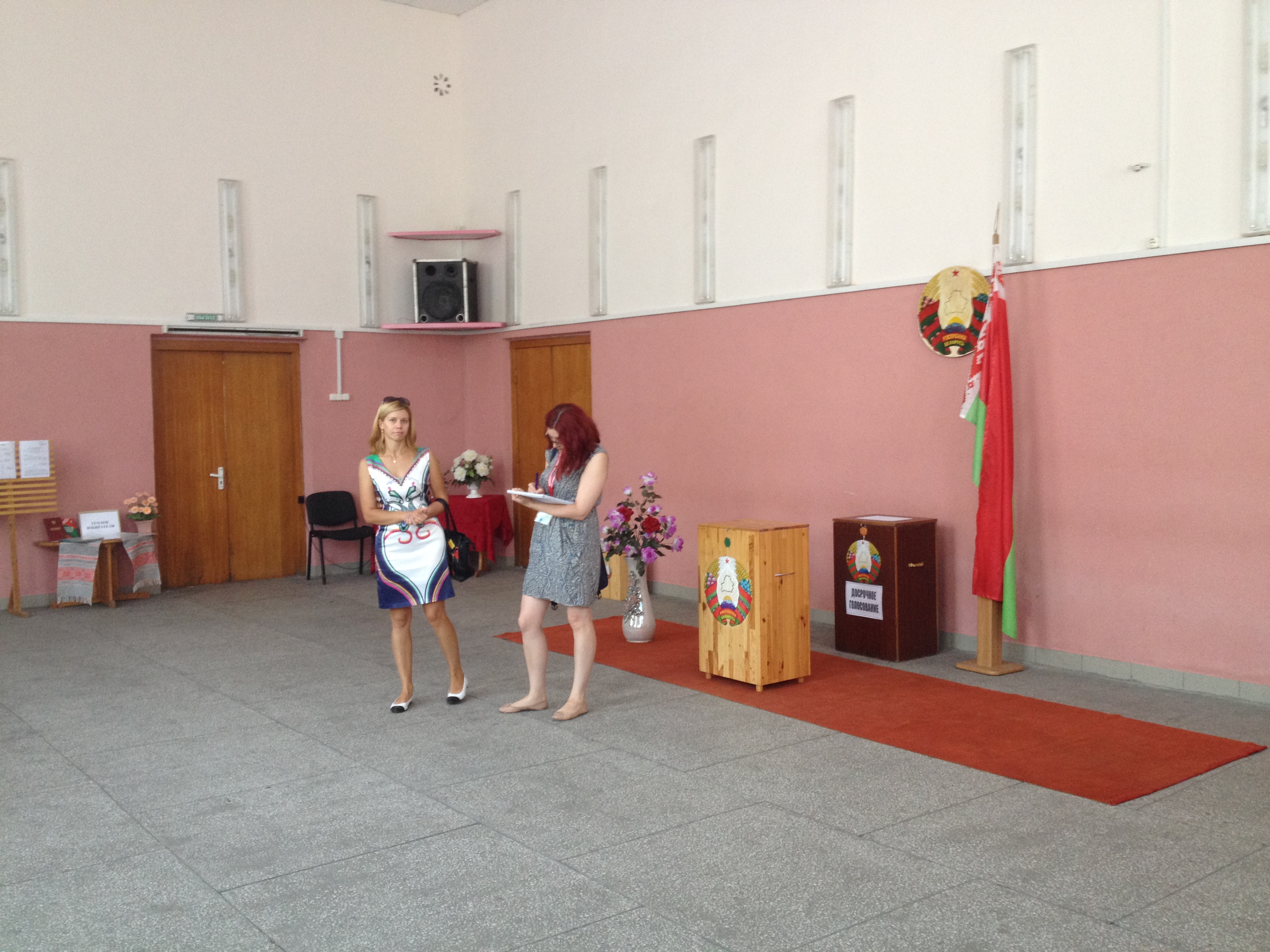
OSCE observers in a polling station in Bokshytsy

Parliamentary elections were held in Belarus on 11 September 2016.

== Electoral system ==
The 110 members of the House of Representatives were previously elected using the two-round system. However, a new electoral code was introduced in 2013, abolishing the requirement for candidates to receive an absolute majority, effectively changing the voting system to first-past-the-post. All candidates are elected in single-member constituencies. However, if there is only one candidate, they are required to receive at least 50% of the votes cast (voters may also vote against all). Voter turnout in a constituency must be at least 50% for the election to be deemed valid.

In cases where the turnout have not been met or no candidate has been elected, repeat elections will be held.

Seat distribution
Region	Seats
City of Minsk	20
Brest Region	16
Gomel Region	17
Grodno Region	13
Mogilev Region	13
Minsk Region	17
Vitebsk Region	14
Total seats	110

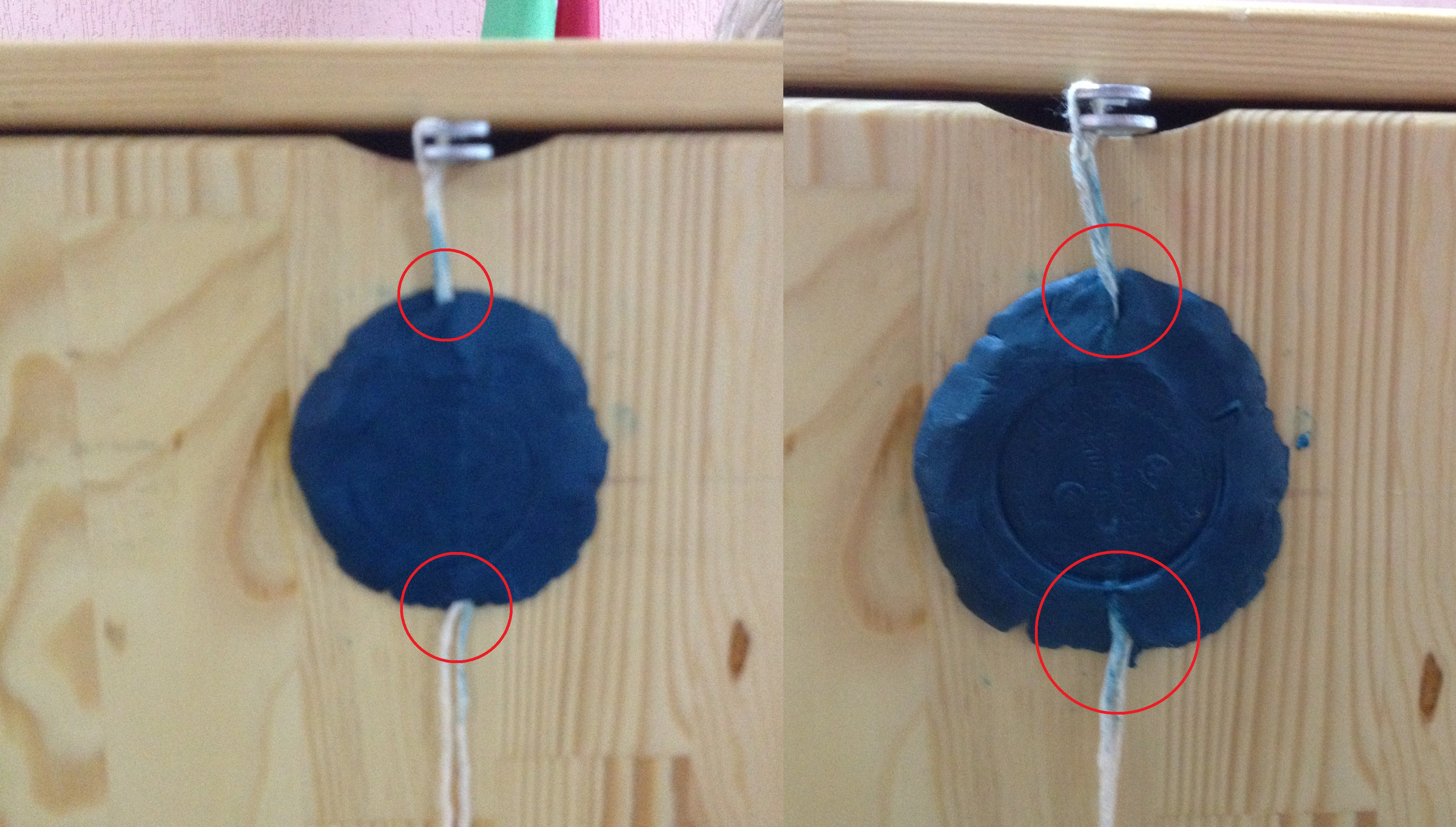
Seal on a ballot box for early voting, Slutsk. The left picture was taken in the evening of the last day of early voting, while the right was taken the next morning. The seal was broken at the top and bottom, indicating it had likely been tampered with.

== Participating parties ==
The pro-government Communist Party of Belarus, the Liberal Democratic Party, the Republican Party of Labour and Justice and the Belarusian Patriotic Party all participated in the elections, whilst many pro-government candidates ran as independents.

In contrast to the previous elections in 2012, the opposition did not boycott the elections, instead forming an alliance under the name Prava Vybaru (Belarusian: Права Выбару, Russian: Право выбора, 'The Right to Choose') consisting of the BPF Party, the Belarusian Christian Democracy, the Belarusian Social Democratic Party (Assembly), the Za svabodu movement, the United Civic Party of Belarus, the Belarusian Party "The Greens", the Belarusian Liberal Party of Freedom and Progress and the Trade Union of Electric Industry. The Belarusian Left Party "A Just World" also contested the elections.

Party	Leader	Ideology	Position	Number of participating constituencies
Liberal Democratic Party	Sergei Gaidukevich	Pan-Slavism	Constructive opposition (declarative); Pro-government (in fact)	73
United Civic Party of Belarus	Anatoly Lebedko	Liberal conservatism	Part of the opposition alliance "The Right to Choose"	53
BPF Party	Alaksiej Janukievich	Belarusian nationalism	Part of the opposition alliance "The Right to Choose"	45
Belarusian Left Party "A Just World"	Sergey Kalyakin	Democratic socialism	Opposition	37
Communist Party of Belarus	Igor Karpenko	Communism, Marxism–Leninism	Pro-government	36
Belarusian Social Democratic Party (Assembly)	Irina Veshtard	Social democracy	Part of the opposition alliance "The Right to Choose"	27
Republican Party of Labour and Justice	Vasil Zadnyaprany	Social democracy	Pro-government	16
Belarusian Patriotic Party	Nikolai Ulakhovich	Social justice	Pro-government	16
Belarusian Party "The Greens"	Aleh Novikaŭ	Green Politics	Part of the opposition alliance "The Right to Choose"	5

== Results ==
The Central Election Commission stated that elections had been deemed valid in all constituencies. At the same time, independent observers declared that turnout data had been falsified in many constituencies, particularly in Minsk, and the real turnout was less than 50% required for the results in a constituency to be deemed valid.

Results by constituency.

The elections saw two opposition candidates win seats, the first since 2004. Hanna Kanapatskaya, a member of the United Civic Party won in one of the Minsk constituencies, whilst independent candidate Alena Anisim won in a constituency in the Minsk Region. The other 93 independent candidates were considered to be pro-government. The Communist Party of Belarus, the Republican Party of Labour and Justice and the Belarusian Patriotic Party all support President Alexander Lukashenko, and although the Liberal Democratic Party declares to be "constructive democratic opposition", it is de facto pro-government.

Party	Votes	%	Seats	+/–
Communist Party of Belarus	380,770	7.40	8	+5
Liberal Democratic Party	218,081	4.24	1	+1
Republican Party of Labour and Justice	147,378	2.87	3	+2
United Civic Party	111,227	2.16	1	New
Belarusian Patriotic Party	111,045	2.16	3	New
BPF Party	88,511	1.72	0	0
Belarusian Left Party "A Just World"	72,185	1.40	0	0
Belarusian Social Democratic Party (Assembly)	66,381	1.29	0	0
Belarusian Green Party	9,038	0.18	0	New
Independents	3,445,562	67.01	94	–11
Against all	491,986	9.57	–	–
Total	5,142,164	100.00	110	0
Valid votes	5,142,164	98.66		
Invalid/blank votes	69,707	1.34		
Total votes	5,211,871	100.00		
Registered voters/turnout	6,978,490	74.68		
Source: CEC (results), CEC (candidate information)
