= National Assembly of the Republic of Belarus =

Bicameral parliament of Belarus

Coordinates: 53°53′46″N 27°32′41.2″E

National Assembly of the Republic of Belarus Нацыянальны сход Рэспублікі Беларусь Национальное собрание Республики Беларусь
- National Assembly of the Republic of Belarus

Type
- Type: Bicameral
- Houses: Council of the Republic; House of Representatives

History
- Founded: 11 November 1996
- Preceded by: Supreme Council of Belarus

Structure
- Seats: 174 members 110 representatives 64 councilors
- Council of the Republic political groups: Government (64): Belaya Rus (16); Communist Party (1); Independent (47)
- House of Representatives political groups: Government (91): Belaya Rus (51); Independent (40); Support (19): RPTS (8); Communist Party (7); LDPB (Note: The Liberal Democratic Party of Belarus asserts that it is an opposition party, but de facto supports the presidency of Alexander Lukashenko.) (4)

Elections
- Council of the Republic voting system: Indirect election by regional assemblies, Appointment by the President of the Republic
- House of Representatives voting system: First-past-the-post
- First Council of the Republic election: 6 January 1997
- First House of Representatives election: 15 October 2000
- Last Council of the Republic election: 4 April 2024
- Last House of Representatives election: 25 February 2024

Meeting place
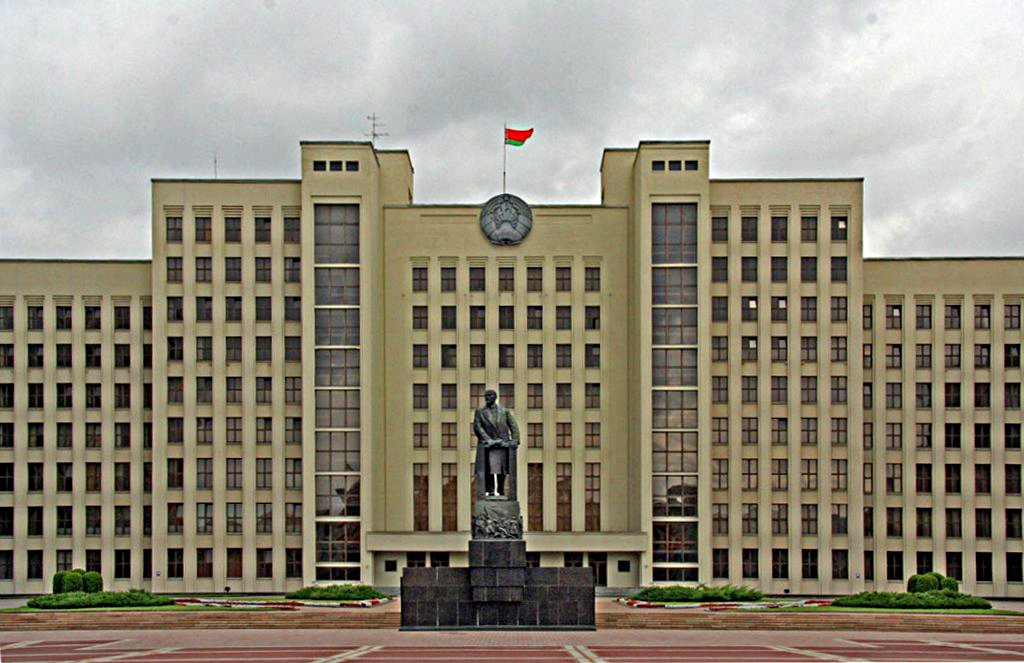
- Government House, Minsk

Website
- house.gov.by sovrep.gov.by

The National Assembly of the Republic of Belarus (Belarusian: Нацыянальны сход Рэспублікі Беларусь, romanized: Nacyjanalny schod Respubliki Bielaruś; Russian: Национальное собрание Республики Беларусь, romanized: Natsionalnoye sobran'ye Respubliki Belarus') is the rubber-stamp bicameral parliament of Belarus. The two chambers of the National Assembly are:

- the Council of the Republic – the upper house
- the House of Representatives – the lower house.

While each chamber has specific duties, both chambers have the ability to veto the decrees of local administrations that deviate from the Constitution of Belarus. The chambers of the National Assembly are convened to two regular sessions every year: the first session opens 2 October and its duration cannot be more than 80 days; the second session opens 2 April and does not last more than 90 days.

The House of Representatives and the Council of the Republic may be convened to an extraordinary session. Extraordinary sessions are convened under a particular agenda upon an initiative of the President or upon a request of at least two-thirds majority of the full membership of each of the chambers. Any bill must be initially considered in the House of Representatives and then in the Council of the Republic.

In practice, the National Assembly has no real power. The Belarusian political system concentrates all governing power in the hands of President Alexander Lukashenko. Notably, the National Assembly has no control over government spending; according to the Constitution, any bill that increases or decreases spending can only be considered with presidential permission. Presidential decrees have greater weight than ordinary legislation. Belarusian elections are recognized as not free and fair, with the National Assembly dominated by regime loyalists in a political system reminiscent of that of the Soviet Union.

Its predecessors were the Supreme Council of Belarus (until 1996) and, before that, the Supreme Soviet of the Byelorussian Soviet Socialist Republic (until 1991).
