= 7th House of Representatives of Belarus =

House of Representatives of the National Assembly of the 7th convocation
| ← | 6th convocation | 8th convocation | → |

Overview
- Legislative body: House of Representatives of the National Assembly
- Jurisdiction: Belarus
- Meeting place: Government House, Sovietskaya 11, Minsk
- Term: 17 November 2019 – 2024
- Website: house.gov.by
- Members: 110
- Chairman: Vladimir Andreichenko
- Deputy Chairman: Valery Mitskevich

The House of Representatives of the National Assembly of the 7th convocation (Belarusian: Палата прадстаўнікоў Нацыянальнага сходу 7-га склікання) is the lower house of the National Assembly, the Parliament of the Republic of Belarus, whose members were elected on 17 November 2019.

Term of office:

- Start date — 17 November 2019.
- First plenary session — 6 December 2019.
- End date — no later than 5 November 2023.

The first meeting of the House of Representatives of the VII convocation, in accordance with the decisions of the Central Commission for Elections and Republican Referendums, was held on 6 December 2019. In accordance with the Regulations, the first meeting of the Chamber was opened and, before the election of the Chairman of the House of Representatives, was chaired by the Chairman of the CEC of the Republic of Belarus Lidia Yermoshina. By secret ballot with the use of ballots at the first meeting, the chairman of the House of Representatives was elected, who for the fourth time became Vladimir Andreichenko and the deputy chairman of the Chamber, who became Valery Mitskevich.

== Election ==
According to the Central Commission for Elections and Referendums, 5,319,568 voters took part in the voting, or 77.4% of the total number included in the voter lists, which is 2.7% more than in the 2016 elections. Elections were held in all districts, that is, all 110 deputies of the House of Representatives were elected.

According to the final results of the elections, 20 candidates from political parties (19.1%) were elected to the House of Representatives of the 7th convocation, of which 11 candidates from the Communist Party (10% of the total). Also, 44 women (40.0%), as well as 2 candidates under the age of 30 became deputies of the seventh convocation, in addition, 30 current deputies (27.3%) were re-elected.

== Composition ==
=== Leadership ===
- Chairman of the House of Representatives -Vladimir Andreichenko.
- Deputy Chairman of the House of Representatives - Valery Mitskevich.

=== Standing commissions ===
- Standing Commission on Legislation - Chairwoman Svetlana Lyubetskaya
- Standing Commission on State Building, Local Self-Government and Regulations - Chairman Valentin Semenyako
- Standing Commission on National Security - Chairman Oleg Belokonev
- Standing Commission on Economic Policy - Chairman Leonid Brich
- Standing Committee on Budget and Finance - Chairwoman Lyudmila Nizhevich
- Standing Commission on Agrarian Policy - Chairman Nikolay Shevchuk
- Standing Commission on Ecology, Nature Management and the Chernobyl Disaster - Chairman Nikolai Vasilkov
- Standing Commission on Human Rights, Ethnic Relations and the Mass Media - Chairman Gennady Davydko;
- Standing Commission on Education, Culture and Science - Chairman Igor Marzalyuk
- Standing Commission on Labor and Social Affairs - Chairwoman Lyudmila Kananovich
- Standing Commission on Health, Physical Culture, Family and Youth Policy - Chairwoman Lyudmila Makarina-Kibak
- Standing Committee on Industry, Fuel and Energy Complex, Transport and Communications - Chairman Igor Komarovsky
- Standing Commission on Housing Policy and Construction - Chairman Viktor Nikolaykin
- Standing Committee on International Affairs - Chairman Andrey Savinykh.

=== Deputies ===
Below is a list of the names of deputies who are elected to the House of Representatives of the National Assembly.

| Constituency | | Deputy | Party | Birth year | Notes |
| Region | Const. | Deputy | Party | Birth year | Notes |
|---|---|---|---|---|---|
| Brest | Brestsky-West | Leonid Brich | BPP | 1958 | |
| Brest | Brestsky-Centre | Marina Vasko | Independent | 1975 | |
| Brest | Brestsky-East | Anatoly Dashko | Independent | 1960 | |
| Brest | Brestsky-Border | Evgeny Zaitsev | Independent | 1970 | |
| Brest | Baranovichsky-West | Igor Khlobukin | Independent | 1973 | |
| Brest | Baranovichsky-East | Pavel Popko | Independent | | |
| Brest | Baranovichsky Rural | Lyudmila Zholnerchik | Independent | | |
| Brest | Belovezhsky | Zhanna Stativko | RPTS | 1968 | |
| Brest | Pruzhansky | Aleksandr Levchuk | Independent | | |
| Brest | Dnepro-Bugsky | Svetlana Bartosh | RPTS | | |
| Brest | Ivatsevichsky | Natalia Golub | CPB | | |
| Brest | Kobrinsky | Vasily Demidovich | Independent | | |
| Brest | Luninetsky | Anatoly Nasenya | Independent | 1979 | |
| Brest | Pinsky City | Alexander Omelyanyuk | Independent | 1964 | |
| Brest | Pinsky Rural | Valentina Begeba | Independent | | |
| Brest | Stolinsky | Alexander Bobolovich | Independent | | |
| Vitebsk | Vitebsky-Gorkovsky | Viktor Nikolaykin | Independent | 1960 | |
| Vitebsk | Vitebsky-Chkalovsky | Tatiana Avtukhova | Independent | 1965 | |
| Vitebsk | Vitebsky-Zheleznodorozhny | Svetlana Gorval | Independent | | |
| Vitebsk | Vitebsky-Oktyabrsky | Aleksei Yegorov | Independent | 1969 | |
| Vitebsk | Gorodoksky | Irina Polyakova | Independent | | |
| Vitebsk | Dokshitsky | Vladimir Andreichenko | Independent | 1949 | Chairman of the House of Representatives |
| Vitebsk | Lepelsky | Igor Martynov | Independent | | |
| Vitebsk | Novopolotsky | Denis Karas | Independent | | |
| Vitebsk | Orshansky City | Inna Krachek | Independent | | |
| Vitebsk | Orshansky-Dneprovsky | Vitaly Vasyukov | Independent | | |
| Vitebsk | Polotsky City | Svetlana Odintsova | Independent | | |
| Vitebsk | Polotsky Rural | Nikolay Shevchuk | Independent | | |
| Vitebsk | Postavsky | Pavel Silchenok | Independent | 1963 | |
| Vitebsk | Sennensky | Aleksandr Dubov | Independent | | |
| Gomel | Gomelsky-Yubileiny | Vitaly Utkin | Independent | | |
| Gomel | Gomelsky-Selmashevsky | Aleksandr Danchenko | Independent | | |
| Gomel | Gomelsky-Tsentralny | Andrei Zlotnikov | RPTS | 1970 | Died on 7 March 2023 |
| Gomel | Gomelsky-Sovetsky | Irina Dovgalo | Independent | | |
| Gomel | Gomelsky-Promyshlenny | Aleksandr Mashkarov | Independent | 1963 | |
| Gomel | Gomelsky-Novobelitsky | Olga Krech | Independent | | |
| Gomel | Gomelsky Rural | Igor Zavaley | Independent | | |
| Gomel | Buda-Koshelevsky | Nikolay Vasilkov | Independent | | |
| Gomel | Zhitkovichsky | Irina Kralevich | CPB | | |
| Gomel | Zhlobinsky | Igor Volkov | Independent | | |
| Gomel | Kalinkovichsky | Yevgeny Adamenko | Independent | | |
| Gomel | Mozyrsky | Valentina Nazarenko | CPB | | |
| Gomel | Polessky | Leonid Pisanik | CPB | | Died on 8 October 2020 |
| Gomel | Rechitsky | Sergey Stelmashok | Independent | | |
| Gomel | Rogachevsky | Sergey Kravtsov | Independent | | |
| Gomel | Svetlogorsky | Igor Tavtyn | Independent | | |
| Gomel | Hoyniksky | Zhanna Chernyavskaya | Independent | | |
| Grodno | Volkovyssky | Pavel Pokonechny | Independent | | |
| Grodno | Grodnensky-Zanemansky | Irina Lukanskaya | Independent | | |
| Grodno | Grodnensky-Oktyabrsky | Yelena Potapova | Independent | | |
| Grodno | Grodnensky-Centralny | Liliya Kiryak | Independent | | |
| Grodno | Grodnensky-Leninsky | Tamara Dolgoshey | Independent | | |
| Grodno | Grodnensky Rural | Aleksandr Autko | Independent | | |
| Grodno | Ivyevsky | Aleksandr Markevich | Independent | | |
| Grodno | Lidsky | Valery Mitskevich | Independent | 1964 | |
| Grodno | Nemansky | Vladimir Sinyak | Independent | | |
| Grodno | Zamkovyy | Aleksandr Songin | Independent | 1969 | |
| Grodno | Slonimsky | Valentin Semenyako | Independent | | |
| Grodno | Smorgonsky | Viktor Svillo | Independent | 1963 | |
| Grodno | Shchuchinsky | Pavel Mikhalyuk | Independent | | |
| Minsk | Berezinsky | Igor Lavrinenko | Independent | 1961 | Died on 14 May 2021 |
| Minsk | Borisovsky City | Aleksandr Shipulo | Independent | 1972 | |
| Minsk | Borisovsky Rural | Liliya Ananich | Independent | 1960 | |
| Minsk | Zhodinsky | Valery Strelchenok | CPB | 1981 | |
| Minsk | Pukhovichsky | Oleg Belokonev | Independent | 1965 | |
| Minsk | Kopylsky | Lyudmila Nizhevich | BAP | 1964 | |
| Minsk | Slutsky | Valentina Razhanets | Independent | 1964 | |
| Minsk | Soligorsky City | Andrey Strunevsky | CPB | 1972 | |
| Minsk | Soligorsky Rural | Yulia Murina | Independent | 1979 | |
| Minsk | Stolbtsovsky | Ivan Mamayko | Independent | 1974 | |
| Minsk | Dzerzhinsky | Aleksandr Sarakach | Independent | 1963 | |
| Minsk | Molodechnensky City | Lyudmila Kananovich | Independent | 1966 | |
| Minsk | Molodechnensky Rural | Oleg Semenchuk | Independent | 1958 | |
| Minsk | Vileysky | Irina Supranovich | CPB | 1973 | |
| Minsk | Logoysky | Pyotr Vabishchevich | CPB | 1963 | |
| Minsk | Senitsky | Lyudmila Podluzhnaya | Independent | 1964 | |
| Minsk | Zaslavsky | Valentina Kursevich | Independent | 1965 | |
| Mogilev | Bobruisky-Leninsky | Irina Ryneiskaya | Independent | | |
| Mogilev | Bobruisky-Pervomaisky | Vera Shirokaya | Independent | | |
| Mogilev | Bobruisky Rural | Vladimir Gatsko | Independent | | |
| Mogilev | Bykhovsky | Sergey Syrankov | Independent | | |
| Mogilev | Goretsky | Yelena Kolesneva | CPB | | |
| Mogilev | Krichevsky | Vladimir Azarenko | Independent | | |
| Mogilev | Mogilevsky-Leninsky | Igor Marzalyuk | Independent | 1968 | |
| Mogilev | Mogilevsky-Centralny | Lyudmila Zdorikova | CPB | | |
| Mogilev | Mogilevsky-Oktyabrsky | Olga Petrashova | Independent | | |
| Mogilev | Mogilevsky-Promyshlenny | Aleksandr Maseikov | Independent | 1971 | |
| Mogilev | Mogilevsky Rural | Natalya Tarasenko | Independent | | |
| Mogilev | Osipovichsky | Svetlana Shutova | Independent | 1967 | |
| Mogilev | Schklovsky | Andrey Ganchuk | Independent | | |
| Minsk City | Shabanovsky | Galina Lagunova | Independent | 1954 | |
| Minsk City | Avtozavodskoy | Aleksandr Grankovsky | Independent | 1963 | |
| Minsk City | Vasnetsovsky | Marina Schkrob | Independent | 1967 | |
| Minsk City | Svislochsky | Valery Voronetsky | Independent | 1963 | |
| Minsk City | Kupalovsky | Tatyana Sayganova | BPP | 1970 | |
| Minsk City | Chkalovsky | Andrey Savinykh | Independent | 1962 | |
| Minsk City | Oktyabrsky | Sergei Klishevich | CPB | 1990 | |
| Minsk City | Grushevsky | Lyudmila Makarina-Kibak | Independent | 1967 | |
| Minsk City | Yugo-Zapadny | Igor Komarovsky | RPTS | 1971 | |
| Minsk City | Yeseninsky | Oksana Gaiduk | RPTS | 1974 | |
| Minsk City | Kamennogorsky | Anna Starovoytova | Independent | 1966 | |
| Minsk City | Zapadny | Marina Lenchevskaya | Independent | 1971 | |
| Minsk City | Pushkinsky | Vasily Panasyuk | Independent | 1966 | |
| Minsk City | Kalvariysky | Maria Vasilevich | Independent | 1997 | |
| Minsk City | Starovilensky | Svetlana Lyubetskaya | Independent | 1971 | |
| Minsk City | Kolasovsky | Sergey Dik | Independent | 1956 | |
| Minsk City | Vostochny | Gennady Davydko | Independent | 1955 | |
| Minsk City | Kalinovsky | Oleg Gaidukevich | LDPB | 1977 | |
| Minsk City | Uruchsky | Ivan Gordeychik | Independent | 1957 | |
| Minsk City | Partizansky | Tengiz Dumbadze | Independent | 1964 | |

== See also ==
- 7th Council of the Republic of Belarus
