= 2024 Belarusian parliamentary election =

- 25 February 2024
- All 110 seats in the House of Representatives; 56 seats needed for a majority
- Turnout: 73.09%
Party	Leader	Seats	+/–
Belaya Rus	Oleg Romanov	51	New
RPTS	Alexander Khizhnyak	8	+2
CPB	Aliaksiej Sokal	7	−4
LDPB	Oleg Gaidukevich	4	+3
Independents	–	40	−49
This lists parties that won seats. See the complete results below.
Result By Districts
Speaker of the House of Representatives before	Speaker of the House of Representatives after
Vladimir Andreichenko; Independent	Igor Sergeenko; Independent

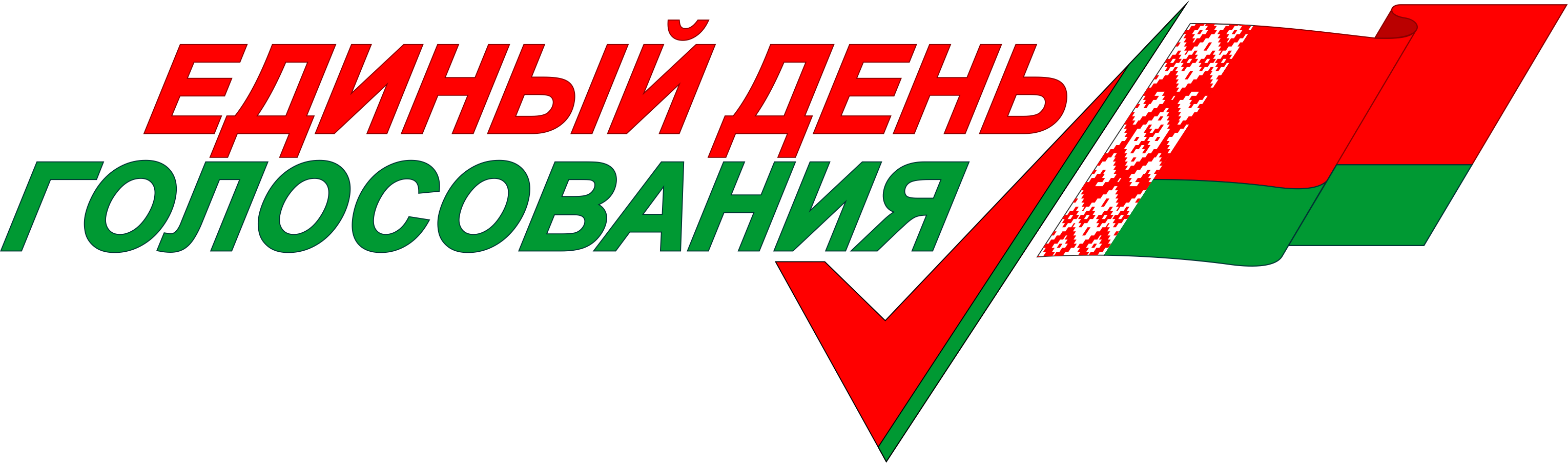
Parliamentary and local elections logo (Russian-language version)

Parliamentary elections were held in Belarus on 25 February 2024. The country elected 110 deputies to the lower house of parliament (House of Representatives) and 12,514 representatives of local councils.

There were no opposition candidates in these parliamentary campaigns — all contenders come from four registered political parties, each of which is pro-government, or pro-government independents. The Belarusian opposition called for boycotting the elections or voting against all. The Belarusian authorities refused to invite observers from the OSCE.

== Background ==
The elections were the first since the 2020–2021 Belarusian protests against the government of President Alexander Lukashenko, who has been in office since 1994. Lukashenko warned that the authorities had "learnt our lesson" since the protests and that there would be "no rebellions" during the election. A month before the election, the Belarusian KGB launched a series of raids targeting the families of political prisoners. Observers and human rights organizations have noted that since the protests, the government has thoroughly "cleansed" the political landscape, and that conditions for free elections are "currently practically absent in Belarus."

On 29 January 2024, at the meeting of the Supreme State Council of the Union State of Russia and Belarus, Lukashenko expressed confidence that the voting will be held calmly. "The period is so difficult, but, as you can see, it passes calmly. And I'm sure we'll approach these dates calmly and hold these events just as calmly." Days before the election, Lukashenko accused the West of trying to use "new triggers to destabilize the society" and claimed that Polish authorities were trying to convince senior Belarusian officials to switch their allegiance as part of a coup plot. Belarusian political analyst Valery Karbalevich noted that Lukashenko was treating the election like a "military operation", with authorities seeing any vote "as a threat and a pretext to step up repressions and tighten the screws."

== Electoral system and conduct ==
The 110 members of the House of Representatives were elected from single-member constituencies by first-past-the-post voting.

On 16 February 2023, the Law "On Amendments to the Electoral Code of the Republic of Belarus" was adopted. According to the law, the minimum voter turnout threshold was abolished and a ban on photographing the ballot paper was introduced. In addition, polling stations for voting abroad were abolished and additional requirements for parliamentary candidates were introduced (including a ban on dual citizenship). The Interior Ministry conducted drills during which police detained offenders photographing ballots and creating artificial queues outside polling stations.

Early voting was held from 20 to 24 February 2024 with turnout reaching over 40% according to authorities. The Viasna Human Rights Center said that students, soldiers, teachers and other government employees were forced to participate in early voting. Authorities later said that total turnout reached 73%.

== Participating parties ==
In February 2023, the Belarusian government changed the legislation on political parties. The minimum number of members was increased from one to five thousand, the obligation to have structures in all country regions and other tightening norms were introduced. In Summer-Autumn 2023, the Belarusian authorities conducted a mass "re-registration" of political parties, as a result of which only 4 out of 15 parties remained registered. 11 other parties - mostly opposition parties - were legally liquidated at the request of the Ministry of Justice of Belarus. The initiator of the party changes was President Lukashenko, who in April 2022 announced about "the upcoming big work in party building and bringing order in public associations" and demanded to rewrite the legislation. And in December he said that "only those parties should work in the political field of the country, the activity of which corresponds to the basic principles of domestic and foreign policy". The political parties that were allowed to run in the elections have supported Lukashenko's policies.

Party	Leader	Ideology	2019 result	
Party	Leader	Ideology	Votes (%)	Seats
Communist Party of Belarus (CPB)	Aliaksiej Sokal	Communism; Marxism–Leninism	10.62%	11 / 110
Liberal Democratic Party of Belarus (LDPB)	Oleg Gaidukevich	Russian-Belarusian unionism Right-wing populism	5.33%	1 / 110
Republican Party of Labour and Justice (RPTS)	Alexander Khizhnyak	Democratic socialism Social democracy	6.75%	6 / 110
Belaya Rus (PBR)	Oleg Romanov	Russophilia; Euroscepticism; Agrarianism	Did not exist	

=== Candidates ===
Party affiliation of candidates for the House of Representatives
Party	Ideology	Candidates by electoral district							
Party	Ideology	Brest Region	Vitebsk Region	Gomel Region	Grodno Region	Minsk Region	Mogilev Region	City of Minsk	Total
Party	Ideology	34	33	43	35	35	26	59	265
Belarusian Party "Belaya Rus"	Pro-Lukashenko	23	13	19	16	15	12	13	111
Communist Party of Belarus	Communism	2	1	3	7	1	6	14	34
Liberal Democratic Party of Belarus	Right-wing populism	1	7	10	3	1	3	11	36
Republican Party of Labour and Justice	Democratic socialism	3	1	8	2	3	3	2	22
Independents		5	11	3	7	15	2	19	62

== Observers ==
Since 1995, no election in Belarus has been recognized as free and fair by the Organization for Security and Cooperation in Europe (OSCE). For the 2024 election, its observers were not allowed to participate in the election, marking the third consecutive time that the organization was prevented from doing so in Belarus. The Belarusian Foreign Ministry said that the "reasons for this are clear and simple," namely "the traditional dominance of representatives of Western countries in OSCE missions," the imposition of "unjustified and tough" sanctions by Western countries and the "deterioration of logistical opportunities" in the movement of its citizens to and from the country. The Central Election Commission of Belarus instead issued invitations to election commissions in other members of the Commonwealth of Independent States and delegates from the Association of World Election Bodies. It also accredited representatives from 23 European Union member states, including from Germany, Poland and Lithuania, whose identities and affiliations were not disclosed. The Parliamentary Assembly of the Collective Security Treaty Organization also sent a mission to observe the vote.

== Results ==
Party	Votes	%	Seats	+/–
Belaya Rus			51	New
Republican Party of Labour and Justice			8	+2
Communist Party of Belarus			7	–4
Liberal Democratic Party of Belarus			4	+3
Independents			40	–49
Total			110	–
Total votes	5,014,437	–		
Registered voters/turnout	6,825,985	73.46		
Source: CEC of Belarus, Tochka.by

The CEC stated that the results of the election will be established by 1 March 2024.

=== Elected deputies ===
On 26 February 2024, the Central Election Commission of Belarus published a preliminary list of elected deputies of the House of Representatives of the eighth convocation.

Region	Constituency	Deputy	Party	Notes
Brest	Brestsky-West	Valentina Pukh	Belaya Rus	
Brest	Brestsky-Centre	Olga Stepus	Independent	
Brest	Brestsky-East	Vladimir Borovenko	Belaya Rus	
Brest	Brestsky-Border	Andrei Krupenkin	Independent	
Brest	Baranovichsky-West	Alexei Raiko	Belaya Rus	
Brest	Baranovichsky-East	Pavel Popko	Belaya Rus	
Brest	Baranovichsky Rural	Georgy Khlebovich	Belaya Rus	
Brest	Belovezhsky	Ekaterina Pozdyaykina	Belaya Rus	
Brest	Pruzhansky	Yury Narkevich	Belaya Rus	
Brest	Dnepro-Bugsky	Svetlana Bartosh	RPTS	
Brest	Ivatsevichsky	Oleg Kuzmin	Belaya Rus	
Brest	Kobrinsky	Polina Vasilyuk	Belaya Rus	
Brest	Luninetsky	Edward Severin	Independent	
Brest	Pinsky City	Alexander Omelyanyuk	CPB	
Brest	Pinsky Rural	Vladimir Kolesnikovich	Belaya Rus	
Brest	Stolinsky	Alexander Vechorko	Belaya Rus	
Vitebsk	Vitebsky-Gorkovsky	Victor Nikolaykin	Independent	
Vitebsk	Vitebsky-Chkalovsky	Irina Astapenko	Belaya Rus	
Vitebsk	Vitebsky-Zheleznodorozhny	Ruslan Shkodin	Independent	
Vitebsk	Vitebsky-Oktyabrsky	Yury Panfilov	Independent	
Vitebsk	Gorodoksky	Andrei Balysh	LDPB	
Vitebsk	Dokshitsky	Anatoly Sivko	Independent	
Vitebsk	Lepelsky	Victor Azarenok	Independent	
Vitebsk	Novopolotsky	Denis Karas	RPTS	
Vitebsk	Orshansky City	Alexander Mikhno	Independent	
Vitebsk	Orshansky-Dneprovsky	Gleb Gulenkov	Independent	
Vitebsk	Polotsky City	Svetlana Odintsova	Independent	
Vitebsk	Polotsky Rural	Alexander Stoma	Belaya Rus	
Vitebsk	Postavsky	Igor Sergeenko	Independent	
Vitebsk	Tolochinsky	Vladimir Babichev	Independent	
Gomel	Gomelsky-Yubileiny	Vitaly Utkin	LDPB	
Gomel	Gomelsky-Zheleznodorozhny	Alexander Konopatsky	CPB	
Gomel	Gomelsky-Tsentralny	Vladimir Gavrilovich	Belaya Rus	
Gomel	Gomelsky-Sovetsky	Irina Dovgalo	Independent	
Gomel	Gomelsky-Promyshlenny	Anzhelina Syromyatnikova	Belaya Rus	
Gomel	Gomelsky-Novobelitsky	Sergei Kazachok	Belaya Rus	
Gomel	Gomelsky Rural	Yulia Volkova	RPTS	
Gomel	Buda-Koshelevsky	Ruslan Vegera	Belaya Rus	
Gomel	Zhitkovichsky	Svetlana Senko	Belaya Rus	
Gomel	Zhlobinsky	Alexander Malobitsky	Belaya Rus	
Gomel	Kalinkovichsky	Nikolai Maratayev	Independent	
Gomel	Mozyrsky	Oksana Kovalkova	Belaya Rus	
Gomel	Polessky	Alla Naumenko	Belaya Rus	
Gomel	Rechitsky	Oleg Tsilko	RPTS	
Gomel	Rogachevsky	Nikolai Kudenchuk	Independent	
Gomel	Svetlogorsky	Elena Lapteva	Belaya Rus	
Gomel	Hoyniksky	Zhanna Chernyavskaya	CPB	
Grodno	Volkovyssky	Victor Pleskach	Belaya Rus	
Grodno	Grodnensky-Zanemansky	Mikhail Oksenyuk	Independent	
Grodno	Grodnensky-Oktyabrsky	Elena Potapova	CPB	
Grodno	Grodnensky-Leninsky	Andrei Anisimov	Belaya Rus	
Grodno	Grodnensky-Severny	Oleg Romanov	Belaya Rus	Belaya Rus leader
Grodno	Grodnensky Border	Anton Kulisevich	Belaya Rus	
Grodno	Ivyevsky	Vitaly Rakovets	Belaya Rus	
Grodno	Lidsky	Ekaterina Serafinovich	Belaya Rus	
Grodno	Nemansky	Mikhail Orda	Independent	FPB leader
Grodno	Zamkovyy	Alexander Songin	RPTS	
Grodno	Slonimsky	Valentin Semenyako	Independent	
Grodno	Smorgonsky	Igor Shaludin	Belaya Rus	
Grodno	Shchuchinsky	Nadezhna Khaltsova	Belaya Rus	
Minsk	Berezinsky	Yury Korsik	Belaya Rus	
Minsk	Borisovsky City	Alexander Shipulo	Belaya Rus	
Minsk	Borisovsky Rural	Ruslan Kosygin	Belaya Rus	
Minsk	Zhodinsky	Yury Maretsky	Independent	
Minsk	Pukhovichsky	Elena Parkhimchik	RPTS	
Minsk	Kopylsky	Andrei Lis	Independent	
Minsk	Slutsky	Natalia Ovsyannikova	Independent	
Minsk	Soligorsky City	Elena Khamitsevich	RPTS	
Minsk	Soligorsky Rural	Oksana Ilkovich	Belaya Rus	
Minsk	Stolbtsovsky	Elena Klishevich	Belaya Rus	
Minsk	Dzerzhinsky	Irina Kostevich	Independent	
Minsk	Molodechnensky City	Denis Ushatsky	Independent	
Minsk	Molodechnensky Rural	Ivan Markevich	Belaya Rus	
Minsk	Vileysky	Svetlana Sokolovskaya	Independent	
Minsk	Logoysky	Tatyana Lavrinovich	Belaya Rus	
Minsk	Senitsky	Anatoly Bulavko	Independent	
Minsk	Zaslavsky	Elena Khilya	Belaya Rus	
Mogilev	Bobruisky-Leninsky	Olga Zhuk	Belaya Rus	
Mogilev	Bobruisky-Pervomaisky	Oksana Prikhodko	LDPB	
Mogilev	Bobruisky Rural	Anton Karankevich	Belaya Rus	
Mogilev	Bykhovsky	Alexandra Mikheyenko	Belaya Rus	
Mogilev	Goretsky	Vladimir Pavlovsky	RPTS	
Mogilev	Krichevsky	Sergei Davydov	Independent	
Mogilev	Mogilevsky-Leninsky	Igor Marzalyuk	Independent	
Mogilev	Mogilevsky-Centralny	Natalia Kuleshova	Belaya Rus	
Mogilev	Mogilevsky-Oktyabrsky	Galina Belyayeva	Belaya Rus	
Mogilev	Mogilevsky-Promyshlenny	Vladimir Podobed	CPB	
Mogilev	Mogilevsky Rural	Natalia Tarasenko	CPB	
Mogilev	Osipovichsky	Oleg Dyachenko	Belaya Rus	
Mogilev	Schklovsky	Valery Malashko	Belaya Rus	
Minsk City	Severny	Dzmitry Shautsou	Independent	
Minsk City	Mashinostroitelny	Gennady Lepeshko	Independent	
Minsk City	Vasnetsovsky	Sergei Rachkov	Independent	
Minsk City	Kupalovsky	Igor Pashkov	Independent	
Minsk City	Svislochsky	Alexander Shpakovsky	Belaya Rus	
Minsk City	Oktyabrsky	Sergei Klishevich	CPB	
Minsk City	Chkalovsky	Vyacheslav Danilovich	Belaya Rus	
Minsk City	Dzerzhinsky	Nastassia Mironchyk-Ivanova	Independent	
Minsk City	Yeseninsky	Ruslan Chernetsky	Belaya Rus	
Minsk City	Yugo-Zapadny	Alexander Barsukov	Independent	
Minsk City	Zapadny	Marina Lenchevskaya	Independent	
Minsk City	Kamenogorsky	Mikhail Mironchik	Independent	
Minsk City	Kalvariysky	Vasily Panasyuk	Belaya Rus	
Minsk City	Lynkovsky	Anzhelika Kurchak	Independent	
Minsk City	Starovilensky	Vadim Ipatov	Independent	
Minsk City	Kolasovsky	Nikolai Buzin	Independent	
Minsk City	Vostochny	Natalia Dergach	Belaya Rus	
Minsk City	Pervomaisky	Oleg Gaidukevich	LDPB	LDPB leader
Minsk City	Uruchsky	Ivan Gordeychik	Independent	
Minsk City	Partizansky	Vadim Gigin	Belaya Rus	

== Reactions ==
On election day Lukashenko announced that he would run again for president in the 2025 elections.

Sviatlana Tsikhanouskaya, Lukashenko's exiled opponent in the 2020 Belarusian presidential election, called for a boycott of the election, saying that "there are no people on the ballot who would offer real changes because the regime only has allowed puppets convenient for it to take part". She also called on the international community not to recognize the results of the election. Tsikhanouskaya's video message was broadcast on 2,000 screens used for street advertising across Belarus after opposition activists managed to gain access to them, leading to the arrests of some employees of the firm which owned the screens. Members of the Belarusian opposition have popularly referred to the elections as biazvybary (Belarusian: Бязвыбары, lit. 'without-elections'), in reference to the tight government control over elections.

Russian president Vladimir Putin congratulated Lukashenko on "the confident victory of patriotic forces of Belarus", which he said helped to "ensure internal political stability."

The United States Department of State condemned the elections, describing them as being "held in a climate of fear under which no electoral processes could be called democratic."
