= Andrei Zlotnikov =

Belarusian sociologist and politician (1970–2023)

Member of the House of Representatives of Belarus
- In office 6 December 2019 – 7 March 2023

Personal details
- Born: Andrei Anatolyevich Zlotnikov; 27 April 1970 Leningrad, Russian SFSR, USSR
- Died: 7 March 2023 (aged 52)
- Party: RPTS
- Education: Belarusian State University
- Occupation: Sociologist

Andrei Anatolyevich Zlotnikov (Belarusian: Андрэй Анатолевіч Злотнікаў; 27 April 1970 – 7 March 2023) was a Belarusian sociologist and politician. A member of the Republican Party of Labour and Justice, he served in the House of Representatives from 2019 to 2023.

== Biography ==
Zlotnikov was born on 27 April 1970, in Leningrad (now Saint Petersburg), in what was then the Russian Soviet Federative Socialist Republic, in the Soviet Union. He graduated from the Belarusian State University in 1994 with the speciality of sociology. His research interests were the sociology of sport and healthy lifestyles; sociology of youth; sociology of the family; and political sociology. He was an associate professor from 2010, and a candidate of sociological sciences from 2008.

Zlotnikov worked at the Pavel Sukhoi State Technical University of Gomel in the Faculty of Humanities and Economics, Department of Philosophy and Sociology, as a lecturer, before joining the Francisk Skorina Gomel State University in 2015 as an associate professor in the Faculty of Law, Department of Political Science and of sociology. He was deputy dean of the faculty since 2016.

Zlotnikov died on 7 March 2023, at the age of 52.
