= 2024 Belarusian municipal elections =

XXIX Convocation Republic of Belarus Local Councils of Deputies elections
- 25 February 2024
- Turnout: 72.98%
	First party	Second party	Third party
Party	Independent	Belaya Rus	Communist Party of Belarus
Seats won	8787	3234	307
	Fourth party
Party	Republican Party of Labour and Justice
Seats won	186
- Results of Local Councils of Deputies elections

Elections to Local Councils of Deputies of Belarus of the 29th convocation (Belarusian: Выбары ў мясцовыя Саветы дэпутатаў Беларусі (2024)) took place on 25 February 2024. Citizens of the respective administrative subdivision elect the council for a term of four years under procedure set within the Electoral Code of Republic of Belarus.

== Background ==
These are the first municipal election that took place since the 2020–2021 Belarusian protests and the 2022 Belarusian constitutional referendum. The authorities used the ongoing tightening of screws to amend the legislation and postpone the municipal election that were originally scheduled to take place in 2022, to 2024 and combine them with the 2024 Belarusian parliamentary election in a single voting day.

== Legislation ==
Deputies of House of Representatives, and deputies to Local Councils of Deputies elections are conducted in single-mandate constituencies. Local Councils' deputies elections have no turnout benchmark, conducted in one voting, where candidate having plurality vote wins.

All Belarusian voters were entitled to vote preliminary, with no official confirmation of reasons of inability to come to voting premises in the main voting day required. The voter is not required to show internal passport: to get ballot one suffice to have any identification document (driving licence, student ticket and so on). Agitation is allowed in the preliminary voting period. Central Election Commission of Belarus does not invite foreign observers, apart from some representatives of the diplomatic corps, to municipal elections, as it is not provided in the legislation.

According to Article 67 of the Constitution of Belarus, as amended by the 2022 referendum, elections of deputies are direct: deputies are elected directly by citizens, and the elections themselves are held on a single voting day on the last Sunday of February.

Due to the introduction of a single voting day, district and area commissions for the elections of deputies of regional Councils of Deputies and the Minsk City Council of Deputies will not be formed in Minsk. Their functions have been transferred to 110 district commissions for the elections of deputies of the House of Representatives. In this case, the boundaries of electoral districts for elections to regional Councils of Deputies and the Minsk City Council will be included in the districts for elections to the House of Representatives, without crossing their borders.

Additional requirements have been introduced for candidates for deputies (they are prohibited from having citizenship of another state and (or) documents of foreign states that give the right to benefits and advantages in connection with political, religious views or national affiliation). In addition, citizens who have or had outstanding criminal record cannot be nominated as candidates for deputies of local Councils of Deputies.

Citizens of the Republic of Belarus and citizens of the Russian Federation who permanently reside in the Republic of Belarus have the right to participate in the elections of deputies of local Councils of Deputies.

== Results ==
The election saw the rise of a new pro-government party, Belaya Rus. The turnout was 72.98%

- Registered Voters: 6,913,550
- Independent
  - Seats Won: 8,787
- Belaya Rus led by Oleg Romanov
  - Seats Won: 3,234
- Communist Party of Belarus led by Aliaksiej Sokal
  - Seats Won: 307
- Republican Party of Labour and Justice led by Alexander Khizhnyak
  - Seats Won: 186
