= 2008 Belarusian parliamentary election =

- 28 September 2008
- All 110 seats in the House of Representatives; 56 seats needed for a majority
- Turnout: 76.74%
Party	Leader	Vote %	Seats	+/–
CPB	Tatsyana Holubeva	4.36	6	−2
BAP	Mikhail Rusy	0.61	1	−2
Independents	–	76.59	103	+5
This lists parties that won seats. See the complete results below.
Results by constituency
Speaker of the House of Representatives before	Speaker of the House of Representatives after
Vadim Popov; Independent	Vladimir Andreichenko; CPB

Parliamentary elections were held in Belarus on 28 September 2008. All 110 seats in the House of Representatives were at stake.

Lidia Yermoshina, the Chairperson of the Central Election Commission, announced on 29 August that 276 candidates were registered for the election; 365 people initially sought to run, but five withdrew and candidate registration for 84 others was rejected. Just prior to the election, the number of the registered candidates was reduced to 263; 82 of the candidates were members of political parties, the others were non-partisans loyal to the government. They included chief executives of local authorities and medical institutions, and top managers of large enterprises. The election was attempted to be monitored by 925 international and more than 17,000 local observers, including an Organization for Security and Co-operation in Europe (OSCE) mission consisting of some 450 members from 43 countries. Belarusian citizens abroad were able to cast their votes at 40 polling stations located in 31 countries. Advance voting occurred on September 23 through September 26 and was characterized by active participation: more than 26% of registered voters cast their ballots. Voter turnout was reported to be 76.7%.

According to the OSCE, the elections were undemocratic and the work of international observers was seriously hindered as the observers were refused access to the facilities where the votes were counted. But according to a CIS election observation mission, the elections in Belarus conformed to international standards.

== Results ==
According to the official results the oppositional parties failed to gain any of the 110 available seats, all of which were given to parties and non-partisan candidates loyal to president Alexander Lukashenko. The Central Election Commission declared this to be due to the overwhelming popular fear of mass demonstrations and of the "radical political changes" demanded by the opposition. This declaration was met with immediate anti-governmental demonstrations in the centre of Minsk protesting against electoral fraud. President Lukashenko commented that the opposition in Belarus is financed by foreign countries and is not needed.

Party	Votes	%	Seats	+/–
Communist Party of Belarus	229,986	4.36	6	–2
United Civic Party	131,931	2.50	0	New
Belarusian Party of Communists	127,429	2.42	0	0
BPF Party	72,770	1.38	0	0
Belarusian Social Democratic Party (Assembly)	59,010	1.12	0	0
Liberal Democratic Party	43,752	0.83	0	–1
Belarusian Agrarian Party	32,230	0.61	1	–2
Republican Party of Labour and Justice	22,763	0.43	0	New
Belarusian Social Democratic Assembly	693	0.01	0	0
Independents	4,035,567	76.59	103	+5
Against all	513,008	9.74	–	–
Total	5,269,139	100.00	110	0
Valid votes	5,269,139	97.85		
Invalid/blank votes	115,508	2.15		
Total votes	5,384,647	100.00		
Registered voters/turnout	7,016,711	76.74		
Source: Nohlen & Stöver, CEC, CEC
