= Alexei Dzermant =

Belarusian philosopher and journalist

- Born: 4 June 1979 (age 47); Talgar, Almaty Region, Kazakh Soviet Socialist Republic, USSR
- Occupations: journalist, philosopher, political scientist
- Awards: Gratitude of the President of the Republic of Belarus Honorary diploma of the Ministry of Information of the Republic of Belarus

Alexey Valeryevich Dzermant (sometimes published as Derman, also Dermant or Dzermanis; Belarusian: Аляксей Валер'евіч Дзермант (Дзерман, Дзерманіс); born 4 June 1979, in Talgar, Almaty Region, Kazakh Soviet Socialist Republic, USSR) is a Belarusian philosopher, journalist and political observer, characterized in non-governmental media as a pro-government political analyst. Until the early 2010s, he was an activist of the neo-pagan movement; currently he is an Orthodox Christian.

== Biography ==
In 2001, Derman (later Dzermant) graduated from the Academy of Administration of the Republic of Belarus, and, in 2006, he continued his education at the Institute of Philosophy of the National Academy of Sciences of Belarus. Between 2008 and 2009, he taught at the European Humanities University. In 2007 he began working as a researcher at the Institute of Philosophy of the National Academy of Sciences of Belarus.

External image
- Алексей Дзермант (слева, с бело-красно-белым флагом) в конце 1990–х — начале 2000–х годов

In the early 2000s, Dzermant was actively involved in Belarusian neo-paganism. Together with Todar Kashkurevich, he published the magazine Druvis. Dzermant also published the almanac Siver and was one of the founders of the neopagan ultra-right organization Gega Ruch, which was compared to the Ahnenerbe. ("Gega Ruch" referred to its ideological predecessor, the Belarusian National Socialist Party of the 1930s, which was oriented towards the NSDAP). Dzermant was also an active member of the center of ethnocosmology KRYUJA (Belarusian: Крыўя). He defended the Baltic nature of the Belarusians and widely used the name Kryvia to refer to Belarus. In particular, in 2002, he stated that the Belarusians (Krivichi) are Slavic-speaking Balts and the third Baltic people.

Dzermant took a critical position with regard to the Eurasian choice for Belarus. In a discussion in the magazine "Baltic Sphere" in 2007, he stated, "It is clear that Belarus is a European country, not Eurasian", and proposed two paradigms of self-determination for the republic: through the Central/Eastern European and Baltic (Baltic-Scandinavian) orientation. In 2012, during the roundtable "The Disintegration of Russia: Threats and Strategies for Regional Security," he called the Eurasian Union "more of an economic election declaration," with no prospect of real content.

In the 2010s, Dzermant's views underwent a significant shift. According to philosopher Vladimir Mackiewicz, Dzermant defected "to the pro-Russian camp from a marginal group of Baltic pagans" and became a "shifter. After changing his views, Dzermant repeatedly advocated for the integration of Belarus and Russia.

In 2016, Dzermant met in Minsk with the leaders of the Italian neo-fascist party New Force and the right-wing British National Party, Roberto Fiore and Nick Griffin.

In the summer of 2020, he suggested that the one-time deterioration in the quality of drinking water in Minsk could have been sabotage. He called for introducing a state of emergency, canceling the elections, and engaging in a large-scale purge of the "fifth column." From June to August 2020, amidst worsening Belarusian-Russian relations, he maintained a cautious stance. However, a few days after the elections, he announced the need to abandon a multi-vector foreign policy and completely refocus on Russia.

In February 2021, Dzermant advocated for banning the white-red-white flag.

On 19 November 2023, Dzermant stated that Lithuanian capital city Vilnius is a "Belarusian city". He criticized emigrated Belarusian politicians, accusing them of favoring "Lithuanian chauvinists" and failing to defend Belarusians interests. Dzermant asserted that the Belarusian national movement in Lithuania should be organized and led by new leaders.

== Public activities ==
Dzermant is the editor-in-chief of the Internet portal imhoclub.by and a member of the Scientific and Expert Council under the chairman of the board of the Eurasian Economic Commission. He is also an expert of the Belarusian pro-presidential Republican Public Association "Belaya Rus", the Russian-Belarusian Expert Club, and the project "Citadel".

In 2020, he became the head of the Center for the Study and Development of Continental Integration "Northern Eurasia". Together with Peter Petrovsky and Alexander Shpakovsky, he participated in the Sonar 2050 project, which, according to political scientist Sergei Bogdan and philosopher Vladimir Matskevich, was funded by the Russian Presidential Administration.

Dzermant is one of the initiators of the "Friends-Syabry" community, which consists of Belarusian and Russian journalists. He is also a member of the Friends Club of the Russian Gorchakov Foundation.

== Performance reviews ==
A number of sources note Dzermant's principled pro-government and conformist stance, which some describing him negatively as a propagandist.

In 2017, Euroradio described Dzermant as "an ardent defender of the 'Russian world, "Nasha Niva" as a "pro-Russian blogger". Ilya Azar, a journalist for the Russian newspaper Novaya Gazeta, referred to Dzermant as "almost the only public person in Minsk with pro-Russian views." The Regnum news agency also noted Dzermant's scandalous image.

The ISANS Analytical Center mentioned Alexey Dzermant and Alexander Shpakovsky as active figures in pro-Russian organizations in Belarus. According to hacked correspondence of publicist Alexander Usovsky, Dzermant received funding from Russia. However, Peter Petrovsky, one of the authors of imhoclub.by, claimed that the correspondence was falsified as part of a discredit campaign organized by the Ukrainian special services due to their refusal to change the editorial policy of imhoclub.by.

== Awards ==
- Special prize for finding the value foundations of Eurasian integration in a book from the Eurasian Development Bank.
- "Golden Bison" from the Russian-Belarusian community of journalists and experts "Friends-Syabry"
- Acknowledgement and Certificate of Appreciation from the Ministry of Information of the Republic of Belarus
- Honorary diploma of the National Academy of Sciences of Belarus for the active promotion of ideas of interethnic and interfaith unity in the media, strengthening the Belarusian statehood.
- Acknowledgement of the President of the Republic of Belarus for his significant contribution to the implementation of the state policy aimed at protecting the sovereignty, ensuring stability and security of the Republic of Belarus, and consolidation of the Belarusian society.
