= 2025 Belarusian presidential election =

- 26 January 2025
- Registered: 6,903,994
- Turnout: 85.70% (▲1.42 pp)

Nominee	Alexander Lukashenko	Sergei Syrankov
Party	Independent	CPB
Alliance	Belaya Rus
Popular vote	5,136,293	189,740
Percentage	87.48%	3.23%
- Results by region
President before election
Alexander Lukashenko
Independent
Elected President
Alexander Lukashenko
Independent

Presidential elections were held in Belarus on 26 January 2025. The president is directly elected to serve a five-year term.

Incumbent president Alexander Lukashenko has won every presidential election since 1994, with all but the first being deemed by international monitors as neither free nor fair. Prior to the elections, independent media was closed down or forced to operate from abroad. Aside from Lukashenko, there were four candidates on the ballot. Three of them represented pro-government parties. The fourth candidate, Hanna Kanapatskaya, was the only formally independent candidate, but opposition figures accused her of being a stooge, which her supporters have denied.

Following exit poll results indicating Lukashenko's decisive victory, the election was described as a sham by critics. Lukashenko faced no serious challenge on the ballot from the other candidates and received over 87% of the vote.

== Background ==
Mass protests alleging widespread vote-rigging erupted after incumbent president Alexander Lukashenko was declared the winner of the 2020 presidential election. He had won every presidential election since 1994, with all but the first being deemed by international monitors as neither free nor fair. Opposition figure Sviatlana Tsikhanouskaya, who claimed to have won the election, went into exile. Tsikhanouskaya formed government-in-exile institutions consisting of the Coordination Council, created in August 2020, and the United Transitional Cabinet, created in August 2022.

On 17 August 2020 Lukashenko stated that the next presidential election could be held earlier than 2025 if a new constitution were to be adopted. Tsikhanouskaya stated that she was ready to lead a transitional government and to hold early elections under international supervision. Lukashenko said that he would resign if a new constitution was adopted.

On 23 October 2024 the Central Election Commission of Belarus (CEC) announced that the election would be held on 26 January 2025, with a potential second round to be held on 12 February.

On 6 November 2024 the Viasna Human Rights Centre reported that Belarusian authorities had started a wave of arrests with over a hundred people detained in a week, many linked to online chats, at a time when Belarusian prisons were already overcrowded.

=== Non-recognition ===
On 23 October 2024, the same day that the CEC announced the election, Tsikhanouskaya, the United Transitional Cabinet, and the Coordination Council stated that they would consider the election to be invalid unless all political prisoners were released, participation by all Belarusians regardless of residence was implemented, and other conditions such as freedom of assembly and equal access to the media were fulfilled. Tsikhanouskaya later called the vote a "farce" and called for a boycott, but advised against protests "until the real moment of possibility".

In November Estonian foreign minister Margus Tsahkna stated that the election would not be recognised by Estonia, saying it would not meet democratic standards. On 9 January 2025, Małgorzata Kidawa-Błońska, Marshal of the Polish Senate, stated that the chamber would not recognise the election. On 22 January, the European Parliament called for the European Union (EU) and EU member states to refuse to recognise Lukashenko as president after the vote.

Outgoing US Secretary of State Antony Blinken said the election cannot be free or fair in an "environment where censorship is ubiquitous and independent media outlets no longer exist". Parliamentary Assembly of the Council of Europe rapporteur Ryszard Petru said on 24 January that the election was lacking in debate, free choice and transparency, which meant that it "cannot and will not meet internationally recognised standards of fairness and legitimacy". The European Commission also called the vote "a total sham". On 25 January, EU foreign policy chief Kaja Kallas also called the election a "sham". A joint EU statement rejecting the legitimacy of the election was blocked by Hungary.

== Electoral system ==
The president of Belarus is elected using the two-round system. If no candidate obtains over 50% of the vote, a second round is held with the top two candidates. The winner of the second round is elected. A turnout quorum of 50% is applied.

== Candidates ==
On 25 February 2024, the day of parliamentary elections, Alexander Lukashenko announced his intention to run for a seventh term in 2025. His candidacy, which was submitted by an initiative group, was accepted by the CEC on 29 October. On the same day, the CEC rejected the candidacies of For Freedom movement leader Yuri Gubarevich, citing "violation of the procedure for submitting documents", and Aliaxandar Drazdou. On 4 November, two more candidates were rejected, Diana Kovaleva and Viktor Kulesh, while three other candidates were allowed to begin collecting signatures to support their candidacies, thereby taking the number of candidates with this status to seven. These include Sergei Syrankov of the Communist Party, Oleg Gaidukevich of the Liberal Democratic Party, and former Interior Ministry spokesperson Olga Chemodanova. On 12 November, Chemodanova and Siarhei Bobrykau dropped their candidacies and endorsed Lukashenko. Following the early December deadline to get 100,000 signatures, the CEC said five candidates were approved to stand:

Candidate	Political party	Current or former position	Signatures
Alexander Lukashenko	Independent	President of Belarus (1994–present)	2,518,145
Oleg Gaidukevich	Liberal Democratic Party of Belarus	Leader of the LDPB (2019–present); Deputy of the House of Representatives (2019–present)	134,472
Sergei Syrankov	Communist Party of Belarus	First secretary of the Central Committee of the Communist Party (2024–present); Deputy of the House of Representatives (2019–2024)	125,577
Hanna Kanapatskaya	Independent (formerly United Civic Party)	Deputy of the House of Representatives (2016–2019)	121,077
Alexander Khizhnyak	Republican Party of Labour and Justice	Leader of the RPTS (2022–present); Member of Minsk City Council (2018–present)	112,779

== Campaign ==
Syrankov supported the rebuilding of monuments to Joseph Stalin and the criminalisation of LGBT activities in Belarus. His campaign slogan was "Not instead of, but together with Lukashenko!". In an interview with the BBC, Syrankov said "there is no alternative to Alexander Lukashenko as the leader of our country", adding that "we are taking part in the election with the president's team". He also called Lukashenko the "main Communist" in Belarus. Likewise, Gaidukevich said "it's obvious that Lukashenko will win" and urged other candidates to "make Lukashenko's enemies nauseous". Alexander Khizhnyak pledged to prevent a "repeat of disturbances" in the 2020 presidential election, while Hanna Kanapatskaya presented herself as the "only democratic alternative to Lukashenko" and pledged for the release of political prisoners while warning supporters against "excessive initiative". She added "I do not fight with police officers because it is a crime. But that doesn't mean I support the policies of the current leadership of the country."

== Opinion polls ==
Date	Agency	Viktar Babaryka	Alexander Lukashenko	Pavel Latushko	Valery Tsepkalo	Sviatlana Tsikhanouskaya	Syarhey Rumas	Sergei Tikhanovsky	Maria Kalesnikava	Vladimir Makei	Zianon Pazniak	Andrey Dmitriyeu	Anatol Liabedzka	Vladimir Karanik	Maxim Znak	Veranika Tsapkala	Natalya Kochanova	Yury Karayeu	Kiryl Rudy	Mikola Statkevich	Other
1–10 Nov 2021	Chatham House	19%	27%	4%	4%	6%	3%	3%	3%	-	-	-	-	-	-	-	-	-	-	-	-
1–10 Nov 2021	Chatham House	30%	30%	11%	8%	10%	5%	8%	8%	4%	-	-	-	-	-	-	-	-	-	-	-
23 Jul – 3 Aug 2021	Chatham House	22%	27%	4%	3%	6%	3%	2%	2%	1%	2%	2%	-	-	-	-	-	-	-	1%	-
23 Jul – 3 Aug 2021	Chatham House	33%	28%	10%	8%	13%	6%	7%	7%	2%	2%	3%	-	-	-	-	-	-	-	2%	-
20–30 Apr 2021	Chatham House	25%	23%	8%	3%	4%	3%	3%	2%	1%	1%	1%	-	-	-	-	-	-	-	2%	-
20–30 Apr 2021	Chatham House	33%	25%	14%	9%	10%	8%	8%	8%	2%	2%	2%	-	-	-	-	-	-	-	4%	-
12 Jan – 8 Feb 2021	Ecoom	2.5%	66.5%	1.3%	-	1.5%	0.4%	-	-	2.4%	-	-	-	-	-	-	4.4%	-	-	-	Roman Golovchenko 3.8%, Oleg Gaidukevich 1.9%
14–20 Jan 2021	Chatham House	28.8%	27.4%	12.1%	3.7%	4.0%	4.3%	5.8%	4.2%	2.3%	1.3%	1.3%	0.1%	0.6%	0.3%	0.1%	0.4%	0.1%	-	2.1%	Paval Sieviaryniec 1.0%
14–20 Jan 2021	Chatham House	35.3%	23.9%	18.3%	9.6%	11.2%	7.3%	8.6%	8.2%	4.4%	2.4%	2.1%	0.6%	1.3%	0.7%	0.8%	1.3%	1.1%	0.1%	4.2%	Paval Sieviaryniec 1.4%, Maksim Bogrecov 0.4%
13–18 Nov 2020	Chatham House	31.7%	24.2%	14.2%	7.0%	6.2%	4.4%	3.3%	3.2%	1.7%	1.4%	1.0%	0.4%	0.4%	0.1%	0.1%	0.1%	0.1%	0.1%	-	Ivonka Survilla 0.0%
13–18 Nov 2020	Chatham House	38.2%	20.8%	20.3%	12.1%	9.9%	7.2%	5.9%	7.5%	2.5%	2.4%	1.5%	0.7%	0.6%	0.7%	0.5%	1.2%	0.5%	0.4%	-	Ivonka Survilla 0.1%

== Results ==
According to an exit poll shown on state television, Lukashenko won with 88% of the vote, with 82% turnout. EU foreign policy chief Kaja Kallas called the election a "blatant affront to democracy". Exiled Belarus opposition leader Sviatlana Tsikhanouskaya called the election "a senseless farce, a Lukashenko ritual".

Candidate	Party	Votes	%
Alexander Lukashenko	Independent	5,136,293	87.48
Sergei Syrankov	Communist Party of Belarus	189,740	3.23
Oleg Gaidukevich	Liberal Democratic Party of Belarus	119,272	2.03
Hanna Kanapatskaya	Independent	109,760	1.87
Alexander Khizhnyak	Republican Party of Labour and Justice	102,789	1.75
Against all		213,277	3.63
Total		5,871,131	100.00
Valid votes		5,871,131	99.24
Invalid/blank votes		45,064	0.76
Total votes		5,916,195	100.00
Registered voters/turnout		6,903,994	85.69
Source: Central Election Commission

== Conduct ==
The CEC did not conduct overseas voting for the election, citing a decrease in the number of diplomatic staff posted abroad. The decision disenfranchised many exiled critics and others who had left the country since 2020. Early voting began on 21 January, with turnout reaching 41.81% by 26 January. Opposition groups said that ballot boxes used in early voting were left unguarded until election day, allowing irregularities to take place. The Belarusian government invited the Organization for Security and Co-operation in Europe to monitor the vote, but the latter was unable to send observers as the invitation was issued only ten days before the election. On 25 March 2025, Alexander Lukashenko was sworn in for a seventh term as President of Belarus after winning 85.7% of the vote in the election.

== Aftermath ==
Lukashenko was congratulated on his victory by the following people:

- Azerbaijani president Ilham Aliyev
- Chinese president Xi Jinping
- Egyptian president Abdel Fattah el-Sisi
- Equatoguinean president Teodoro Obiang Nguema Mbasogo
- Georgian president Mikheil Kavelashvili
- Ghanaian president John Mahama
- Indian prime minister Narendra Modi
- Iranian president Masoud Pezeshkian
- Kazakh president Kassym-Jomart Tokayev
- Kenyan president William Ruto
- Kuwaiti emir Mishal Al-Ahmad Al-Jaber Al-Sabah
- Kyrgyz president Sadyr Japarov
- Laotian president Thongloun Sisoulith
- Mongolian president Ukhnaagiin Khürelsükh
- Nigerian president Bola Tinubu
- North Korean leader Kim Jong Un
- Omani sultan Haitham bin Tariq
- Pakistani prime minister Shehbaz Sharif
- Qatari emir Tamim bin Hamad Al Thani
- Russian president Vladimir Putin
- Turkish president Recep Tayyip Erdoğan
- Saudi king Salman
- Serbian president Aleksandar Vucic
- Sri Lankan president Anura Kumara Dissanayake
- Nicaraguan president Daniel Ortega
- Tajik president Emomali Rahmon
- Thai prime minister Paetongtarn Shinawatra
- Turkmen president Serdar Berdimuhamedow
- Uzbek president Shavkat Mirziyoyev
- Ecuadorian president Daniel Noboa
- Emirati president Mohamed bin Zayed Al Nahyan
- Venezuelan president Nicolás Maduro
- Vietnamese president Lương Cường
- Burmese Prime Minister Min Aung Hlaing
- Cuban president Miguel Díaz-Canel

He was also congratulated by several pro-Russian Moldovan politicians: former president and Party of Socialists leader Igor Dodon, fugitive oligarch Ilan Shor and Gagauz governor Evghenia Guțul.

== See also ==
- Coordination Council (Belarus)
- Belarusian partisan movement (2020–present)
