= 2018 Belarusian municipal elections =

XXVIII Convocation Republic of Belarus Local Councils of Deputies elections
- 18 February 2018
- Turnout: 77.23%
	First party	Second party	Third party
Party	Independent	Communist Party of Belarus	Republican Party of Labour and Justice
Seats won	17663	309	127
	Fourth party	Fifth party	Sixth party
Party	Social Democratic Party of Popular Accord	Liberal Democratic Party of Belarus	Belarusian Socialist Sporting Party
Seats won	11	4	4
	Seventh party	Eighth party
Party	Belarusian Agrarian Party	Belarusian Patriotic Party
Seats won	1	1
- Results of Local Councils of Deputies elections

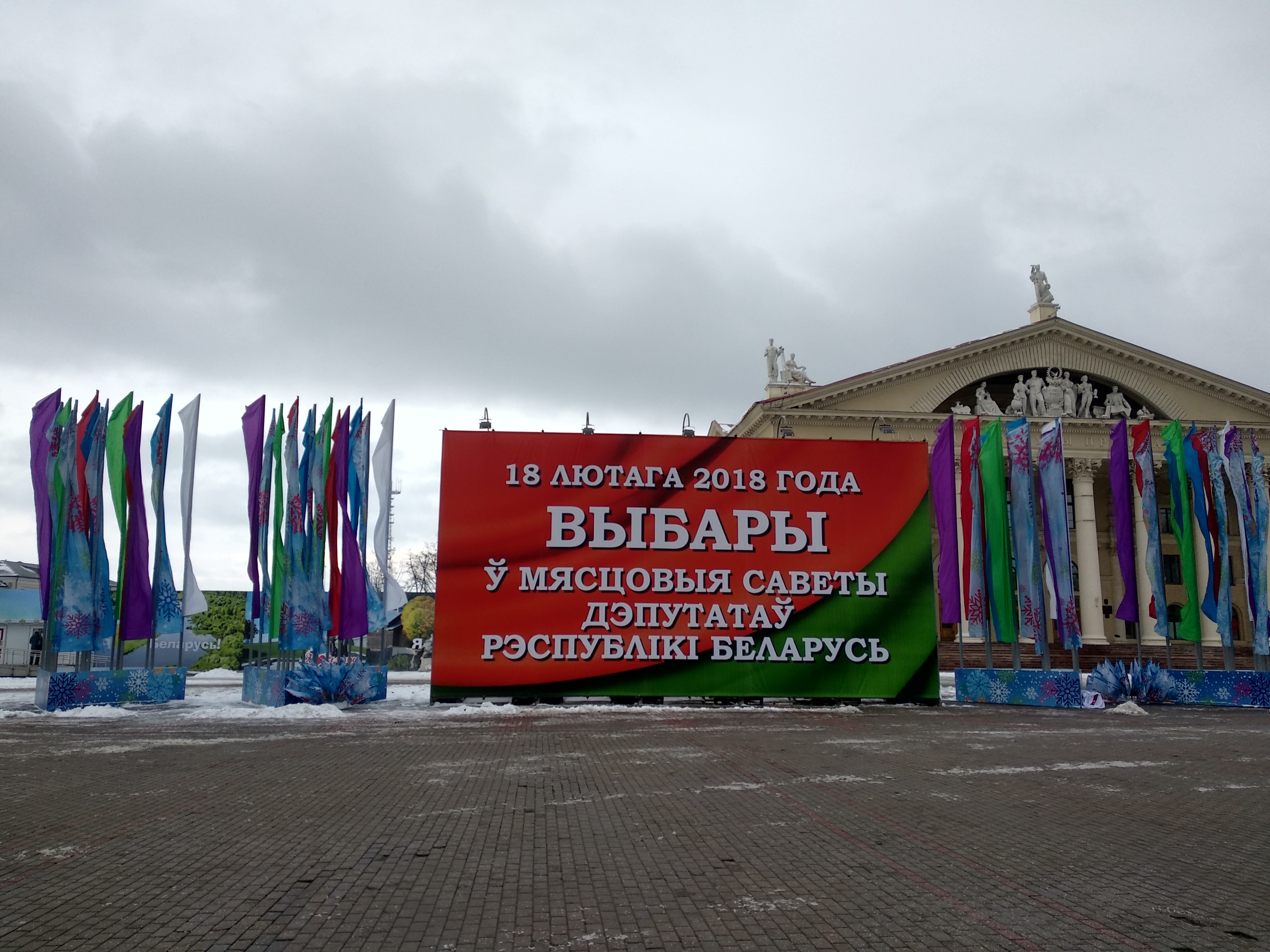
Invitation to elections. Text: "18 February 2018. Republic of Belarus Local Councils of Deputies elections."

28th Convocation Republic of Belarus deputies to Local Councils of Deputies elections are elections to Belarus Local Councils to Deputies elections conducted on 18 February 2018. Electoral campaign started in November 2017. Citizens of the respective administrative subdivision elect the council for a term of four years under procedure set within the Electoral Code of Republic of Belarus.

Deputies of House of Representatives, and deputies to Local Councils of Deputies elections are conducted in single-mandate constituencies.

Local Councils' deputies elections have no turnout benchmark, conducted in one voting, where candidate having plurality vote wins.

All Belarusian voters are entitled to vote preliminary, with no official confirmation of reasons of inability to come to voting premises in the main voting day required. The voter is not required to show internal passport: to get ballot one suffice to have any identification document (driving licence, student ticket and so on). Agitation is allowed in the preliminary voting period. CEC does not invite foreign observers, apart from some representatives of the diplomatic corps, to municipal elections, as it is not provided in the legislation.

== General information ==
On 14 November 2017 President of Belarus Alexander Lukashenko signed decree #410 "On appointment of Local Councils of Deputies elections".

Out of 18,111 deputies of 1,309 Local Councils of Deputies most represent Rural Councils (1,152 Councils):

- Rural Councils— 1,152 councils and 13,225 seats;
- Town Councils— 8 councils and 98 seats;
- Local City Councils— 14 councils and 242 seats;
- Regional City Councils – 10 councils and 370 seats;
- District Councils— 118 councils and 3,787 seats;
- Regional Councils and Minsk-city Council of Deputies— 7 councils and 409 seats.

== Electoral system ==
The elections were held under plurality vote. A citizen of Republic of Belarus of 18 years of age are entitled to be elected a deputy to Local Council of Deputies. Citizens living or working on the territory of the respective Local Council of Deputies are entiteled to be nominated as candidates. This right as well implies to citizens working in organizations related to fullmilment of needs of residents or social development of the territory of the respective Local Council of Deputies, though such organization located on the territory of the other Local Council of Deputies. A political party is entitled to nominate only one candidate to deputy amongst its members within single House of Representatives or respective Local Council of Deputies electoral district. A candidate receiving most votes is considered as elected to the Local Council of Deputies. In case of one-candidate election, such candidate is considered elected if one receives more than half of votes given.

== Nomination procedure ==
Legislation sets a number of requirements towards citizens willing to nominate themselves as a candidate to deputy to Local Councils of Deputies:

- Republic of Belarus or Russian Federation nationality;
- 18 years of age;
- residence or job on the territory of the Local Council of Deputies;
- clean record.

A citizen is entitled to nominate oneself in one of electoral districts of the Local Council of Deputies of each territorial level (Regional, District, and Rural Council of Deputies).

Nationals of Russian Federeation with permanent residence on the territory of Republic of Belarus are entiteled be nominated as candidates to deputies of Local Councils of Deputies.

Citizens, working in organizations related to fullmilment of needs of residents or social development of the territory of the respective Local Council of Deputies, though such organization located on the territory of the other Local Council of Deputies, are entitled to nominate oneself as a candidate to deputy of Local Council of Deputies, even having no residence or job on the territory of such Council. Such legal norm is usually implied to the employees of organizations located in cities that are the centers of several subdivisions. Such rule does not imply towards political parties and NGOs.

== Candidate registration ==
Out of 22,278 registered candidates to deputy 21,227 (95.28%) were not political party members, while political parties nominated 1,051 candidates (4.72%), with most of party candidates nominated by the Communist Party (1.84%) and Liberal-Democratic Party (1.02%). Political party members are mostly nominated to deputies of Mnsk-city, Regional and District Councils of Deputies.

Registration of public interest groups on voters signature collection by candidates to deputies of 28 Convocation Local Councils as of 25 December 2017:

Data on registered candidates to deputies of Local Councils:
Party	Local Councils of Deputies								
Party	Minsk-city	Regional	District	City (regional)	City (local)	Town	Rural	Total registered	in %
Independent	118	555	4,473	631	288	101	15,115	21,281	95.42
Communist Party of Belarus	42	25	189	16	0	1	128	401	1.80
Liberal Democratic Party of Belarus	49	110	11	48	0	1	0	219	0.98
Republican Party of Labour and Justice	12	18	72	18	1	0	52	173	0.78
United Civic Party	7	29	11	21	0	0	1	69	0.31
Belarusian Left Party "A Just World"	6	25	5	22	0	0	1	59	0.26
Belarusian Social Democratic Party (Assembly)	5	23	6	12	0	0	2	48	0.22
BPF Party	2	4	4	6	2	0	5	23	0.10
Social Democratic Party of Popular Accord	0	2	3	1	0	0	9	15	0.07
Belarusian Christian Democracy	0	0	0	0	0	0	0	0	0.00
Party of Freedom and Progress	0	0	0	0	0	0	0	0	0.00
Belarusian Socialist Sporting Party	6	0	0	1	0	0	0	7	0.03
Belarusian Patriotic Party	2	0	1	0	0	0	0	3	0.01
Belarusian Green Party	2	0	0	1	0	0	0	3	0.01
Belarusian Agrarian Party	2	0	0	0	0	0	0	2	0.01
Total	253	791	4,775	777	291	103	15,313	22,303	100

== Voting ==
In a period of 15 days before elections, voting stations commissions represent the citizens the voters lists. Voters are entitled to seek for liquidation of mistakes in the lists, including seeking for such liquidations in trials. Preliminary voting for voters not able to stay in their residence location in the voting day is organized 5 days before the elections date. Voters, unable to come to voting station in the election day can be provided with voting on their immediate location.

Preliminary election was held on 13–17 February 2018. According to CEC data, 34.95% voters took part in the preliminary election until its final day. In the main voting day, voting stations worked from 8 am till 8 pm, and, according to official CEC data, the turnover reached 5.3 mln voters (77.2%) till the moment of voting stations closure. Out of 18,111 districts, one electoral district of Yelʹsk District of Gomel Region failed to hold elections due to the only candidate's detention for receiving a bribe.

=== Fraud ===
789 observers of "For just elections" campaign" participated in the elections monitoring, 114 of who monitored the process of preliminary voting, covering 54 voting stations in 22 settlements, including Minsk City Council of Deputies. Upon the results of monitoring, the campaigns observers concluded the official results of deputies to Local Councils elections do not represent real citizens' volition. Moreover, in several voting stations observers were prohibited to take video and photoshots of vote-counting process in the day of elections, reasoning such restrictions with only journalists being entitled to do so.

=== Elections boycott ===
Conservative Christian Party – BPF did not participate in 2018 municipal elections. Party leadership informed the party did not will to create the regime bogus of so-called "elections". Meanwhile, party conducted electoral control of the process. First of all it counted the number of people coming to vote to show regime in the light of its lies existing as a fact of life.

Belarusian Social Democratic Assembly, led by Stanislav Shushkevich, did not participate in 2018 municipal elections. It's a principal position of the party, having been consistently ignoring several electoral campaigns in a row. "Results of the previous elections, when government "turned off" several democratic candidates, show us we do everything right. So, how many such elections we need for everyone to finally understand that there are no free elections in Belarus?! BSDA party understands it's a vain deal, thus it did not participate in the elections at all",— BSDA leader Stanislav Shushkevich told on 19 February.

Mikola Statkevich, leader of Belarusian Social Democratic Party (People's Assembly), told municipal elections topic is not worth discussing. "This municipal elections do not decide anything, no vote is count, and people still do not believe the government. We have many young party members, and we didn't oppose them to try their hand and educate themselves in these elections privately. This is the best way of learning. However, as the previous "elections" showed, to go here and there to ask for a piece of power is humiliating and lost case. Supporters of "peacefull change" were not given a seat even in any rural council",- Statkevich told.

Belarusian Labour Party, and Republican Party did not participate in elections.

== Results ==
=== General ===
According to voting results, out of 18,120 deputies to Local Councils of Deputies elect, vast majority or 17,663 deputies are not members to any political party, and only 457 deputies are members to political parties consisting 2.5%. The most represented parties in Local Councils are supporters of Alexander Lukashenko: Communist Party (309 seats) and RPLJ (127 seats). Among opposition no candidate managed to win the vote, only 4 members of Liberal Democratic Party positioning itself as constructive opposition managed to succeed. 21 national of Russian Federation managed to be elected as 28th Convocation Local Council Deputy.

The elections resulted in turnover over 77%, with 35% voted preliminarily. In a single electoral district of Yelʹsk District Council of Deputies of Gomel Region, elections did not take place, due to the only candidate's withdrawal a day before the elections. 48%of deputies elected are women, 56%elected to Local Councils before, one out of three works in science, education, and healthcare sphere, and one out of five works in agriculture. 4% deputies are under 31, and 2% represent political parties.

Party	Local Councils of Deputies								
Party	Minsk-city	Regional	District	City (regional)	City (local)	Town	Rural	Total elected	in %
Independent	40	335	3,548	348	242	97	13,053	17,663	97.48
Communist Party of Belarus	6	9	161	9		1	123	309	1.71
Republican Party of Labour and Justice	5	5	64	9			44	127	0.70
Social Democratic Party of Popular Accord		2	3	1			5	11	0.06
Liberal Democratic Party of Belarus	1	1	1	1				4	0.02
Belarusian Socialist Sporting Party	3			1				4	0.02
Belarusian Patriotic Party	1							1	0.01
Belarusian Agrarian Party	1							1	0.01
Total	57	352	3,777	369	242	98	13,225	18,120	100

=== Brest region ===
==== Elections to Brest Regional Council of Deputies ====
Party	Votes	%	Seats	+/-
Independent	586,056	76.45	54	▼3
Republican Party of Labour and Justice	32,502	4.24	2	▲2
Communist Party of Belarus	18,087	2.36	1	▲1
Belarusian Social Democratic Assembly	9,078	1.18	0	Steady
Liberal Democratic Party	4,336	0.57	0	Steady
Belarusian Left Party "A Just World"	4,273	0.56	0	Steady
United Civic Party of Belarus	3,664	0.48	0	Steady
BPF Party	1,018	0.13	0	Steady
None of the above	107,250	13.99	-	-
Invalid ballots	14,830	-	-	-
Total	781,387	100	57	0
Registered/turnout	982,014	79.57	-	-
Source: Брестская ОИК (In Russian — Brest REC)

=== Vitebsk Region ===
==== Elections to Vitebsk Regional Council of Deputies ====
Party	Votes	%	Seats	+/-
Independent	574,538	79.95	58	Steady
Liberal Democratic Party	26,566	3.70	0	Steady
Communist Party of Belarus	21,069	2.93	2	Steady
United Civic Party of Belarus	11,534	1.61	0	Steady
Belarusian Left Party "A Just World"	3,921	0.55	0	Steady
Republican Party of Labour and Justice	2,384	0.33	0	Steady
BPF Party	950	0.13	0	Steady
None of the above	90,728	12.63	-	-
Invalid ballots	13,066	-	-	-
Total	731,690	100	60	0
Registered/turnout	865,282	84.49	-	-
Source: Витебская ОИК (In Russian — Vitebsk REC)

=== Gomel Region ===
==== Elections to Gomel Regional Council of Deputies ====
Party	Votes	%	Seats	+/-
Independent	712,121	81.37	53	▼6
Communist Party of Belarus	48,119	5.50	3	▲2
Liberal Democratic Party	45,307	5.18	0	Steady
Republican Party of Labour and Justice	34,550	3.95	2	▲2
Social Democratic Party of Popular Accord	21,209	2.42	2	▲2
Belarusian Left Party "A Just World"	7,749	0.89	0	Steady
United Civic Party of Belarus	6,153	0.70	0	Steady
None of the above	76,100	8.70	-	-
Against the only candidate	16,293		-	-
Invalid ballots	10,742	-	-	-
Total	885,950	100	60	0
Registered/turnout	1,097,164	80.75	-	-
Source: Гомельская ОИК (In Russian — Gomel REC)

=== Grodno Region ===
==== Elections to Grodno Regional Council of Deputies ====
Party	Votes	%	Seats	+/-
Independent	483,023	80.21	53	Steady
Liberal Democratic Party	14,901	2.47	1	▲1
Belarusian Left Party "A Just World"	4,342	0.72	0	Steady
United Civic Party of Belarus	3,746	0.62	0	Steady
None of the above	96,205	15.97	-	-
Invalid ballots	8,209	-	-	-
Total	610,426	100	60	0
Registered/turnout	764,601	79.84	-	-
Source: Гродненская ОИК (In Russian — Grodno REC)

=== Minsk Region ===
==== Elections to Minsk Regional Council of Deputies ====
Party	Votes	%	Seats	+/-
Independent	696,676	80.79	58	Steady
Communist Party of Belarus	29,767	3.45	2	▲1
Liberal Democratic Party	15,433	1.79	0	Steady
Belarusian Social Democratic Party (Assembly)	5,475	0.63	0	Steady
BPF Party	905	0.10	0	Steady
Republican Party of Labour and Justice	704	0.08	0	▼1
Belarusian Left Party "A Just World"	571	0.07	0	Steady
United Civic Party of Belarus	483	0.06	0	Steady
None of the above	112,335	13.03	-	-
Invalid ballots	13,965	-	-	-
Total	876,334	100	60	0
Registered/turnout	1,123,094	78.03	-	-
Source: Минская ОИК (In Russian — Minsk REC)

=== Mogilev Region ===
==== Elections to Mogilev Regional Council of Deputies ====
Party	Votes	%	Seats	+/-
Independent	562,667	84.94	54	▼3
Communist Party of Belarus	13,522	2.04	1	Steady
Liberal Democratic Party	10,205	1.54	0	Steady
United Civic Party of Belarus	7,093	1.07	0	Steady
Belarusian Left Party "A Just World"	2,288	0.35	0	Steady
Belarusian Social Democratic Party (Assembly)	2,068	0.31	0	Steady
Republican Party of Labour and Justice	1,502	0.23	0	Steady
BPF Party	861	0.13	0	Steady
None of the above	61,988	9.36	-	-
Invalid ballots	9,445	-	-	-
Total	671,839	100	55	▼3
Registered/turnout	813,225	82.61	-	-
Source: Могилёвская ОИК (In Russian — Mogilev REC)

=== Minsk ===
==== Elections to Minsk-City Council of Deputies ====
Party	Votes	%	Seats	+/-
Independent	408,608	55.10	40	▼8
Communist Party of Belarus	105,290	14.20	6	▲1
Liberal Democratic Party	54,852	7.40	1	▲1
Republican Party of Labour and Justice	54,342	7.33	5	▲3
Belarusian Socialist Sporting Party	28,262	3.81	3	▲1
Agrarian Party (Belarus)	10,954	1.48	1	▲1
Belarusian Patriotic Party	6,223	0.84	1	▲1
United Civic Party of Belarus	4,619	0.62	0	Steady
Belarusian Left Party "A Just World"	3,884	0.52	0	Steady
Belarusian Social Democratic Party (Assembly)	2,303	0.31	0	Steady
Belarusian Green Party	2,117	0.29	0	Steady
BPF Party	1,554	0.21	0	Steady
None of the above	64,840	8.74	-	-
Invalid ballots	4,640	-	-	-
Total	789,027	100	57	0
Registered/turnout	1,277,388	61.77	-	-
Source: Минская ГИК (In Russian — Minsk CEC)

== Links ==
- Центральная избирательная комиссия по проведению выборов и референдумов Республики Беларусь. Выборы в местные Советы депутатов—2018 (In Russian — Central electoral commission on elections and referendums of Republic of Belarus. 2018 Local Councils of Deputies Elections)
- Сведения о составе избранных депутатов местных Советов депутатов двадцать восьмого созыва (In Russian — Data on deputies elected to 28th Convocation Local Councils)
- Информация о выборах в местные Советы депутатов (In Russian — Information on Local Councils of Deputies elections
