= Svetlana Lyubetskaya =

Belarusian politician (born 1971)

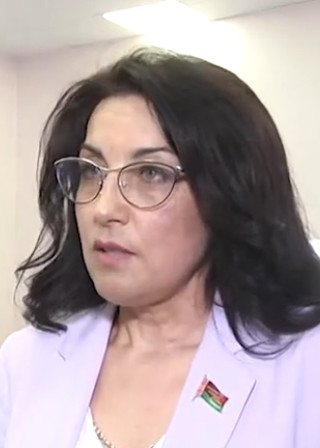
- Lyubetskaya in 2021

Judge of the Constitutional Court
- Incumbent
- Assumed office 21 May 2024
- Appointed by: Alexander Lukashenko
- Preceded by: Valentina Podgrusha

Member of the House of Representatives
- In office 6 December 2019 – 21 March 2024
- Constituency: Starovilensky

Personal details
- Born: 3 June 1971 (age 54) Ukrainian SSR, Soviet Union

Svetlana Anatolevna Lyubetskaya (Russian: Светлана Анатольевна Любецкая; born 3 June 1971) is a Belarusian politician serving as a judge of the Constitutional Court since 2024. From 2019 to 2024, she was a member of the House of Representatives.
