= Alexander Khizhnyak =

Belarusian politician (born 1978)

Leader of the Republican Party of Labour and Justice
- Incumbent
- Assumed office 3 September 2022
- Preceded by: Alexander Stepanov

Personal details
- Born: 16 March 1978 (age 48)
- Party: Republican Party of Labour and Justice

Alexander Nikolaevich Khizhnyak (Russian: Александр Николаевич Хижняк; born 16 March 1978) is a Belarusian politician serving as leader of the Republican Party of Labour and Justice since 2022.

== Biography ==
=== Early life ===
Khiznyak was born on 16 March 1978 in Khoiniki to Nikolai and Irina, a worker on the local railroad, and an economist respectively. Khiznyak and his family where evacuated from Khoiniki due to the Chernobyl disaster being resettled in Smalyavichy before moving to Chysts. Khimnyak graduated from the Belarusian Commercial University with a law degree, and continued his education at the Academy of Public Administration.

=== Career ===
After his graduation Khiznyak worked as a lawyer for Belgiproagropischeprom, a design institute in Minsk before working for the Belarusian State Research and Design Institute of Urban Planning. An Urban Planning specialist, Khimnyak worked on designing urban layouts for settlements in Russia, Venezuela, Kazakhstan, and Azerbaijan.

In 2018 he was elected member of the Minsk City Council on behalf of the Republican Party of Labour and Justice (RPTS) and was reelected in 2024. His policy positions while in the city council included working to lift western Sanctions, promoting education and family support, and preserving equality and Belarusian sovereignty. In 2022 Khiznyak was elected the leader of the RPTS and despite his continued rise in politics he has gone on record saying it was easier being an urban planner than a politician, and that he preferred designing cities.

In November 2024 he submitted paperwork to stand for president of Belarus in the 2025 presidential election.

== Personal life ==
Khiznyak is married to Alena Alexandrovna, a museum worker, the couple have three kids; Nikita, Vladislav and Maxim.

While in high-school Khiznyak was a Greco-Roman wrestler and he shares a name with Ukrainian Alexander Khizhnyak who won a gold medal for boxing at the 2024 Summer Olympics, and silver medal at the 2020 Summer Olympics.
