= Sergei Gaidukevich =

Belarusian politician (born 1954)

- Сяргей Гайдукевіч
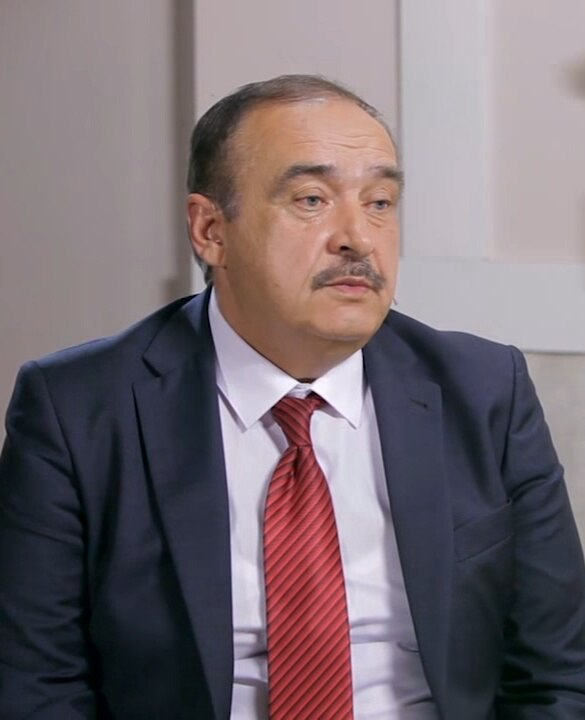

Chairman of the Liberal Democratic Party of Belarus
- In office 1995 – 21 September 2019
- Preceded by: Position established
- Succeeded by: Oleg Gaidukevich

Personal details
- Born: September 8, 1954 (age 70); Minsk, Belarusian SSR, Soviet Union (now Belarus)
- Political party: Liberal Democratic Party

Sergei Gaidukevich (Belarusian: Сяргей Гайдукевіч, Russian: Сергей Гайдукевич; born 8 September 1954, Minsk, Belarus) is a Belarusian politician. He was the Liberal Democratic Party candidate in the 2001, 2006, and 2015 elections for the office of President of Belarus. He was defeated in all attempts, since incumbent Alexander Lukashenko received an overwhelming majority of votes each time. He served as chairman of the Liberal Democratic Party, from 1995 until September 2019, when he was succeeded by his son, Oleg Gaidukevich. He was then granted the title of Honorary Chairman at the 20th Congress of the Liberal Democratic Party. Gaidukevich has higher military education and served as an officer in the armed forces. Later he was a government functionary associated with various military issues.

His son is Oleg Gaidukevich.
