= Igor Lavrinenko =

Belarusian politician (1961–2021)

Member of the House of Representatives of the National Assembly of Belarus
- In office 6 December 2019 – 14 May 2021

Personal details
- Born: 17 April 1961 Minsk, Byelorussian SSR, Soviet Union
- Died: 14 May 2021 (aged 60)
- Party: Nonpartisan

Igor Vladimirovich Lavrinenko (Belarusian: Ігар Уладзіміравіч Лаўрыненка; 17 April 1961 – 14 May 2021) was a Belarusian politician.

== Biography ==
Born in Minsk, Lavrinenko attended the NBC Protection Military Academy and the Military Academy of the General Staff of the Armed Forces of Russia. A member of the Soviet Armed Forces and later the Armed Forces of Belarus, he achieved the rank of major general.

In the 2019 Belarusian parliamentary election, he was elected to the House of Representatives, the lower body in the bicameral National Assembly of Belarus, with 75.85% of the vote in the electoral district No. 61 of the Minsk region. In the Seventh Convocation, he served as Deputy Chairman of the Standing Commission on National Security.

Igor Lavrinenko died on 14 May 2021, at the age of 60.

== Awards ==
- Order of the Red Star
- Order "For Service to the Homeland in the Armed Forces of the USSR"
- Medal "For Impeccable Service"
