= Valery Strelchenok =

Belarusian politician (born 1981)

Member of the House of Representatives
- In office 6 December 2019 – 21 March 2024
- Constituency: Zhodinsky

Personal details
- Born: 15 September 1981 (age 44)
- Party: Communist Party of Belarus

Valery Ivanovich Strelchenok (Russian: Валерий Иванович Стрельчёнок; born 15 September 1981) is a Belarusian politician serving as director of the Zhodino State Polytechnic College since 2024. From 2019 to 2024, he was a member of the House of Representatives.
