= List of members of the Belarusian Parliament, 1990–95 =

The Supreme Soviet of the Byelorussian Soviet Socialist Republic (later renamed to Supreme Soviet of Belarus) of 12th convocation (1990–1995) was the first parliament in history of independent Belarus.

== List of members of the Belarusian Parliament ==
1. Uładzimir Hančaryk
2. Uładzimir Harkun
3. Alexander Gerasimenko
4. Ihar Hiermiančuk
5. Nil Hilevich
6. Valancin Hołubieŭ
7. Gennady Grushevoy
8. Myechyslaw Hryb
9. Vasily Dolgolyov
10. Mikałaj Damaškievič
11. Vasil Dvaraninovič
12. Nikolai Dementey
13. Inesa Drabyšeŭskaja
14. Alaksiej Kamaj
15. Jaŭhien Kanapla
16. Ivan Karatčenia
17. Viktar Karniajenka
18. Hienadź Karpienka
19. Vyachaslau Kebich
20. Leanid Kozik
21. Piotr Kraŭčanka
22. Anatol Kuźma
23. Vyacheslav Nikolayevich Kuznetsov
24. Alaksandr Kuličkoŭ
25. Viktar Kučynski
26. Anatol Labiedźka
27. Vasil Lavonaŭ
28. Alexander Lukashenko
29. Viačasłaŭ Lubavicki
30. Michaił Marynič
31. Mikałaj Markievič
32. Siarhei Navumchyk
33. Anatol Niatylkin
34. Yevgeny Novikov
35. Zyanon Paznyak
36. Stanislau Shushkevich
