= Siamion Domash =

Belarusian politician (1950–2019)

Siamion Mikalayevich Domash (Belarusian: Сямён Мікалаевіч Домаш, Russian: Семён Никола́евич До́маш; 2 January 1950 – 9 February 2019) was a Belarusian politician and trades unionist. He was Chairman of Grodno Region in 1994. He was registered to run in the 2001 Belarusian presidential election, but exited from the campaign, endorsing Vladimir Goncharik. He died of a heart attack in 2019.
