= Alexander Shpakovsky =

Belarusian politician (born 1984)

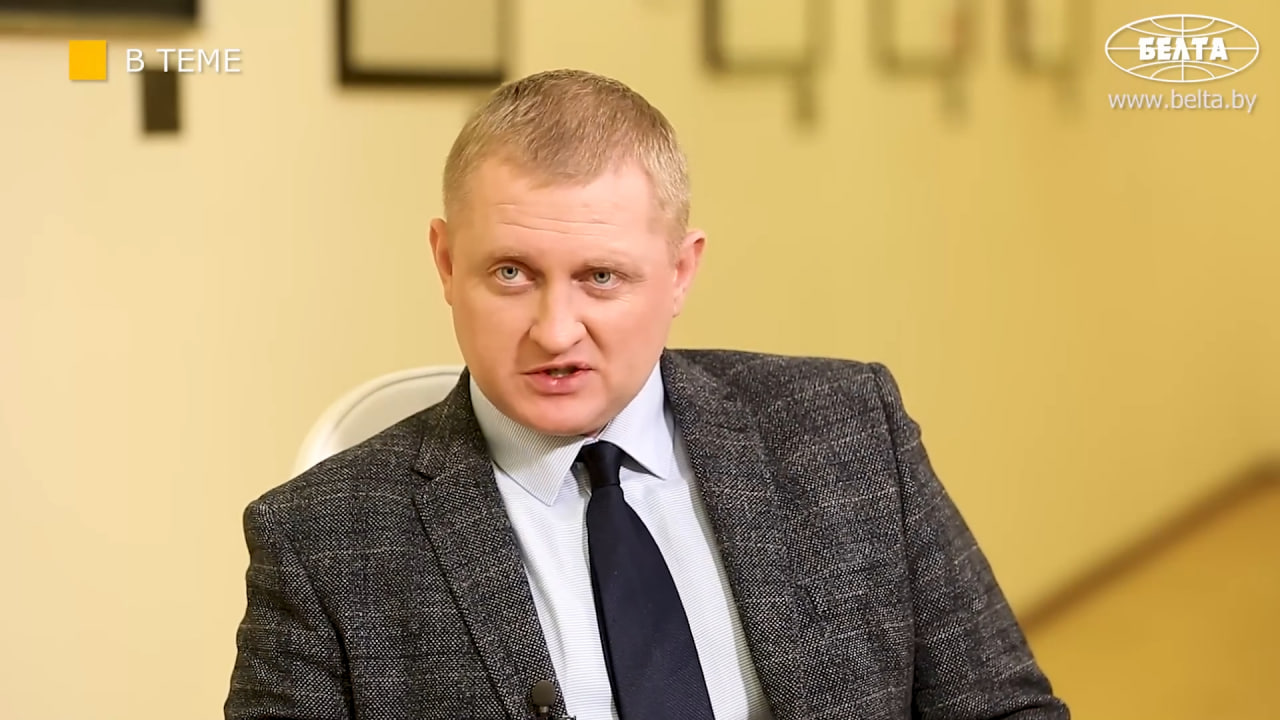
- Shpakovsky in 2022

Member of the House of Representatives
- Incumbent
- Assumed office 22 March 2024
- Constituency: Svislochsky

Personal details
- Born: 18 November 1984 (age 41)
- Party: Belaya Rus

Alexander Pavlovich Shpakovsky (Russian: Александр Павлович Шпаковский; born 18 November 1984) is a Belarusian politician serving as a member of the House of Representatives since 2024. From 2021 to 2022, he was a member of the constitutional commission.
