= Liberal Democratic Party of Belarus =

Belarusian right-wing political party

Liberal Democratic Party of Belarus Ліберальна-дэмакратычная партыя Беларусі Либерально-демократическая партия Беларуси
- Abbreviation: LDPB (English); ЛДПБ (Belarusian and Russian)
- Leader: Oleg Gaidukevich
- Founders: Vasily Krivenko; Sergei Gaidukevich
- Founded: 5 February 1994
- Registered: 24 February 1994
- Preceded by: Liberal Democratic Party of the Soviet Union in Belarus
- Headquarters: 12th Building, Filimonova St, Minsk, Belarus
- Newspaper: Truth of Gaidukevich
- Membership (2020): 55,867
- Ideology: Right-wing populism; Russian-Belarusian unionism; Euroscepticism; Pro-Lukashenko (de facto)
- Political position: Right-wing
- Regional affiliation: Liberal Democratic Party of Russia; Liberal Democratic Party of Transnistria; Front (Poland)
- European affiliation: Alliance for Peace and Freedom (cooperation)
- Colours: Navy blue
- Slogan: "Law! Order! Patriotism!" (Russian: «Закон! Порядок! Патриотизм!») "A Strong Belarus!" (Russian: «Сильная Беларусь!»)
- House of Representatives: 4 / 110
- Council of the Republic: 0 / 64
- Regional seats: 2 / 409
- Local seats (2018): 4 / 18,120

Party flag

Website
- ldpb.by

The Liberal Democratic Party of Belarus (LDPB, Belarusian: Ліберальна-дэмакратычная партыя Беларусі, romanized: Libieraĺna-demakratyčnaja partyja Bielarusi, Russian: Либерально-демократическая партия Беларуси, romanized: Liberal'no-demokraticheskaya partiya Belarusi) is a right-wing political party in Belarus. It was created in 1994 as the Belarusian successor of the Liberal Democratic Party of the Soviet Union.

Despite claiming to be a "constructive and democratic opposition" the party de facto supports the current president, Alexander Lukashenko (much like the Liberal Democratic Party of Russia with Vladimir Putin).

In the legislative elections, 13–17 October 2004, the party won 1 out of 110 seats. Its candidate in the presidential election of 2006, Sergei Gaidukevich, won 3.5% of the vote.

Party leader Gaidukevich was a member of the House of Representatives from 2004 to 2008. He was later a member of the Council of the Republic from 2016 to 2019.

== Ideology ==
Despite the name, the party does not support liberalism or liberal democracy. Rather, according to Pippa Norris, the LDPB is dedicated to the restoration of the Soviet Union and Russian-Belarusian unionism. The party is opposed to NATO, the European Union and what it calls "international monopolies". It gathers its main support from ex-servicemen mainly from the time of the Soviet Union, from nostalgics of the Soviet Union, and those who favor closer ties or even union with Russia; it is especially strong in Minsk, Vitebsk and some other regional cities.

The LDPB has no democratic structure and was run by Sergei Gaidukevich from 1994 to 2019, when he was succeeded by his son Oleg Gaidukevich. Its main domestic ally was the Belarusian Patriotic Party until it was banned in 2023.

== Election results ==
=== Presidential elections ===
| Election | Candidate | First round | | Second round | | Result |
| Election | Candidate | Votes | % | Votes | % | Result |
|---|---|---|---|---|---|---|
| 1994 | Endorsed Vyacheslav Kebich | 1,023,174 | 17.33% | 748,329 | 14.17% | Lost ✗ |
| 2001 | Sergei Gaidukevich | 153,199 | 2.48% | | | Lost ✗ |
| 2006 | Sergei Gaidukevich | 230,664 | 3.48% | | | Lost ✗ |
| 2010 | Sergei Gaidukevich | Withdrew from the elections | | | | |
| 2015 | Sergei Gaidukevich | 201,945 | 3.30% | | | Lost ✗ |
| 2020 | Oleg Gaidukevich | Withdrew from the elections, supported Alexander Lukashenko | | | | |
| 2025 | Oleg Gaidukevich | 119,272 | 2.04% | | | Lost ✗ |

=== Legislative elections ===
| Election | Leader | Performance | | | | | Rank | Government |
| Election | Leader | Votes | % | +/– | Seats | +/– | Rank | Government |
|---|---|---|---|---|---|---|---|---|
| 1995 | Sergei Gaidukevich | | | | 0 / 260 | New | 22nd | Extra-parliamentary |
| 2000 | Sergei Gaidukevich | | | | 1 / 110 | ▲1 | ▲5th | "Constructive opposition" |
| 2004 | Sergei Gaidukevich | 122,605 | 2.01% | New | 1 / 110 | 0 | ▲3rd | "Constructive opposition" |
| 2008 | Sergei Gaidukevich | 43,752 | 0.81% | ▼1.20 | 0 / 110 | ▼1 | ▼6th | Extra-parliamentary |
| 2012 | Sergei Gaidukevich | 249,455 | 4.76% | ▲3.95 | 0 / 110 | 0 | ▲4th | Extra-parliamentary |
| 2016 | Sergei Gaidukevich | 218,081 | 4.24% | ▼0.52 | 1 / 110 | ▲1 | 4th | "Constructive opposition" |
| 2019 | Oleg Gaidukevich | 280,683 | 5.36% | ▲1.12 | 1 / 110 | 0 | 4th | "Constructive opposition" |
| 2024 | Oleg Gaidukevich | | | | 4 / 110 | ▲3 | 4th | "Constructive opposition" |

== See also ==
- Liberal Democratic Party of Transnistria
- Liberal Democratic Party of Russia
- Liberal Democratic Party of Ukraine
- Union of Russia and Belarus
- Political family
