= Sergei Klishevich =

Belarusian politician (born 1990)

Sergey Klishevich
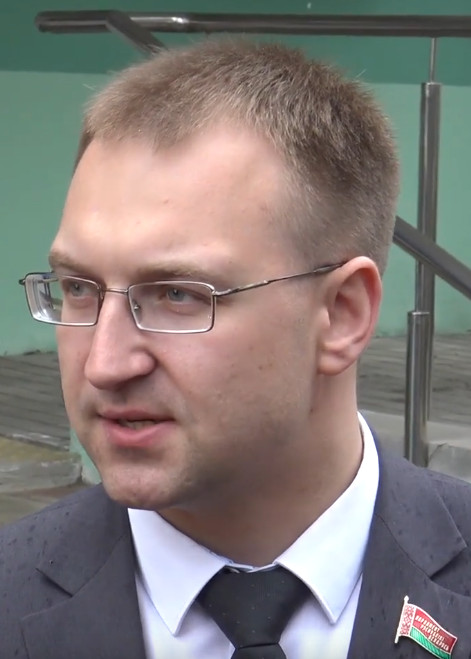
- Klishevich in 2020

Member of the House of Representatives
- Incumbent
- Assumed office 6 December 2019
- Constituency: Oktyabrsky

Personal details
- Born: 23 September 1990 (age 35)
- Party: Communist Party of Belarus

Sergei Mikhailovich Klishevich (Russian: Сергей Михайлович Клишевич; born 23 September 1990) is a Belarusian politician serving as a member of the House of Representatives since 2019. From 2017 to 2020, he served as first secretary of the Belarusian Republican Youth Union in Minsk. From 2011 to 2013, he served as first secretary of the Belarusian Republican Youth Union at the Belarusian State University.
