= Oleg Gaidukevich =

Belarusian politician

- Алег Гайдукевіч; Олег Гайдукевич
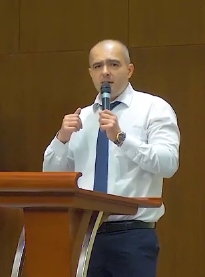
- Gaidukevich in 2018

Chairman of the Liberal Democratic Party of Belarus
- Incumbent
- Assumed office 21 September 2019
- Preceded by: Sergei Gaidukevich

Deputy of the House of Representatives of the National Assembly of Belarus
- Incumbent
- Assumed office 6 December 2019

Personal details
- Born: Alieh Siarhiejevič Hajdukievič; 26 March 1977 (age 49) Minsk, Belarusian SSR, Soviet Union (now Belarus)
- Party: Liberal Democratic Party
- Spouse: Maria Gaidukevich (née Shukhno)
- Children: 2
- Parent: Sergei Gaidukevich (father)
- Education: Ministry of the Interior Academy (1998); Academy of Public Administration (2018)

Military service
- Allegiance: Belarus
- Branch/service: Ministry of Internal Affairs
- Years of service: 1999–2012
- Rank: Police Lieutenant Colonel

Oleg Sergeevich Gaidukevich or Alyeh Syarhyeyevich Haydukyevich (Note: Belarusian: Алег Сяргеевіч Гайдукевіч, romanized: Aleh Siarhiejevič Hajdukievič, Russian: Олег Сергеевич Гайдукевич, romanized: Oleg Sergeevič Gajdukevič) (born 26 March 1977) is a Belarusian politician, lawyer and policeman who has been the chairman of the Liberal Democratic Party of Belarus since 2019, succeeding his father Sergei Gaidukevich.

He is a member of the House of Representatives of the Republic of Belarus of the seventh convocation (2019–2024), deputy chairman of the House of Representatives Commission on International Affairs.

He is under personal sanctions by the European Union, the United Kingdom, the United States, Canada, Switzerland and other states.

== Biography ==
He was born on 15 March 1977 in Minsk.

In 1998, he graduated from the academy of the Ministry of the Interior Academy of the Republic of Belarus with a degree in Law and is qualified as a lawyer. In 2018, he underwent retraining at the Institute of Public Service of the Academy of Public Administration with a degree in International Relations.

He began his career in 1998 in the Frunzyenski District Department of Internal Affairs (RUVD) of the city of Minsk as an employee of the department for combating economic crimes. He worked as a detective officer, senior detective officer of the Department of Economic Crimes of the Frunzenski RUVD, senior detective officer of the department of grave crimes of the Department of Economic Crimes of the Main Internal Affairs Directorate of the Minsk City Executive Committee, deputy head of the Department of Economic Crimes of the PartizanskiDistrict Department of Internal Affairs and head of the Department of Economic Crimes of the Frunzenski RUVD.

From 1999 to 2012 he worked in law enforcement. In 2007, he received the position of head of the district police department of the Partizanski district of the capital. Two years later, he headed the Frunzensky district police department, where he led a staff of 800 employees. Having risen to the rank of lieutenant colonel, he retired from the police to engage in political and social activities.

From 2012 to 2014 he was Deputy Chairman of the Liberal Democratic Party of Belarus. In April 2013, he was elected by the XIV Party Congress as a member of the Supreme Council of the Liberal Democratic Party of Belarus. From 2014 to 2019 he was First Deputy Chairman of the Liberal Democratic Party of Belarus, which was headed by his father Sergei Gaidukevich.

In 2016, he ran for deputy of the House of Representatives in the Svisloch electoral district No. 94 in Minsk. According to the election results, he received 7,597 votes (19.0%) and took second place, losing to Valery Voronetsky.

On 21 September 2019, at the 20th Congress of the Liberal Democratic Party, Oleg Gaidukevich was elected chairman of the party, replacing his father, Sergei Gaidukevich, in this position.

In 2019, he again ran for deputy of the House of Representatives in Kalinovsky district of Minsk No. 108. According to the final election results, Gaidukevich received 19,539 votes (48.16%) of voters in the district and was elected as a deputy of the 7th convocation of the House of Representatives. Of the 98 candidates nominated by the Liberal Democratic Party, he was the only candidate to be elected.

=== During the 2020–2021 Belarusian protests ===
He took part as a preliminary candidate in the campaign for the 2020 Belarusian presidential election. His initiative group was one of the 15 registered, including 4,034 people.

Shortly after registering his group on 26 May 2020, he announced that he was refusing to participate in the elections in favor of Alexander Lukashenko, because, according to him, “the collapse of the country cannot be allowed.” On 14 July 2020 he became a confidant of candidate Lukashenko.

At the beginning of September, voters of Kalinovsky electoral district No. 108 collected 700 signatures (out of 19,539 expressing confidence in deputy Gaidukevich) under a letter about the loss of confidence in deputy Gaidukevich, which did not lead to his recall.

In February 2021, he initiated the passage of a foreign agents law, which critics see as a potential means for President Lukashenko to put pressure on Western human rights activists and dissidents.

Gaidukevich has repeatedly spoken in the media in defense of Lukashenko and the official state structure of the Belarus and in criticism of the opposition. He condemned the 2020–2021 Belarusian protests, calling them “an attempt by the opposition, paid by the EU and the USA, to carry out a coup.”

He also criticized the introduction of international sanctions against Belarus following the suppression of protests after the 2020 election, and called for criminal liability for calls for sanctions.

In May 2021, on television, he called for the arrest of people who called for the seizure of power in Belarus, and then after the Ryanair Flight 4978 interception incident, he said that “extremists can be detained on the territory of other states and brought here in the trunk, for example, and immediately to a pre-trial detention center.”.

=== 2025 election ===
Gaidukevich was the Liberal Democratic Party's candidate in the 2025 Belarusian presidential election. Despite running against Lukashenko, he said "It's obvious that Lukashenko will win" and urged other candidates to “make Lukashenko’s enemies nauseous”.

== International sanctions ==
On 21 June 2021, he was included in the EU Black List. According to the EU decision, Gaidukevich "made public statements welcoming the redirection of Ryanair passenger flight 4978 to Minsk on 23 May 2021. This politically motivated decision was made without proper justification and was aimed at the arrest and detention of opposition journalists Roman Protasevich and Sofia Sapega and is a form of repression against civil society and the democratic opposition in Belarus". In addition, the United Kingdom, Canada, and Switzerland included Gaidukevich in their sanctions lists. On 6 July 2021, Albania, Iceland, Liechtenstein, Norway, North Macedonia, and Montenegro joined the June package of EU sanctions.

On 9 August 2021, Oleg Gaidukevich was also added to the US Specially Designated Nationals and Blocked Persons List. In March 2022, he was included in the Japanese sanctions list.

By decree of Ukrainian president Volodymyr Zelenskyy dated 19 October 2022, he is under sanctions of Ukraine.

In May 2023, the European Court of Justice rejected Gaidukevich's claim to lift sanctions against him.

== Personal life ==
Oleg Gaidukevich is married and has two daughters. His wife is Maria Valentinovna Gaidukevich, daughter of Valentin Mikhailovich Shukhno, former chairman of the State Securities Committee of the Republic of Belarus.

His father is Sergei Gaidukevich.

== State awards ==
- Medal "For Impeccable Service" III degree.
- Medal "For Labor Merit" (31 March 2022).
