= Aliaksiej Sokal =

Belarusian politician

- Аляксей Сокал; Алексей Сокол

First Secretary of the Communist Party of Belarus
- In office 14 May 2017 – 25 May 2024
- Preceded by: Ihar Karpienka
- Succeeded by: Sergei Syrankov

Deputy of the House of Representatives of the National Assembly of Belarus
- In office 11 October 2016 – 6 December 2019

Member of the Minsk City Council of Deputies
- In office 23 March 2014 – 11 October 2016

Personal details
- Born: Aliaksiej Mikalajevič Sokal; 18 November 1973 (age 52) Minsk, Byelorussian SSR, Soviet Union (now Belarus)
- Party: Communist Party of Belarus
- Children: 1

Aliaksiej Mikalajevič Sokal (Belarusian: Аляксей Мікалаевіч Сокал) or Aleksey Nikolayevich Sokol (Russian: Алексей Николаевич Сокол) (born 18 November 1973) is a Belarusian communist politician, chairman of the Central Committee of the Communist Party of Belarus since 14 May 2017. In 2016-2019 he was a deputy of the House of Representatives of the Republic of Belarus, and before that he was a member of the Minsk City Council of Deputies (27th convocation).

== Biography ==
Aliaksiej Sokal was born on 18 November 1973 in the city of Minsk (Belarusian SSR, USSR), into a family of employees.

After school, he graduated from the Minsk Mechanical Engineering College with a degree in “Installation and operation of metalworking machines and automatic lines”. He has a higher education, graduated from the Belarus State Economic University, majoring in economics-manager; He also graduated from the Academy of Management under the President of the Republic of Belarus and is a specialist in the field of public administration.

He worked as a warehouse picker, salesman, merchandiser, deputy and head of the trade organization department, deputy director, first deputy general director of the open joint-stock company TSUM Minsk.

On March 23, 2014, he was elected as a deputy of the Minsk City Council of Deputies of the twenty-seventh convocation; in 2016, after being elected as a deputy of the House of Representatives, he resigned early. Over a short period of work in his district, he achieved landscaping of courtyards, major repairs of houses, installation of asphalt roads, development of convenience stores and solving everyday issues of citizens in housing and communal services.

On 11 September 2016, he was elected as a deputy of the House of Representatives in the Eastern District No. 107 of the city of Minsk. According to the election results in the district, 40,436 (59.0%) people took part in the voting, of which 22,301 votes were cast for Aliaksiej Sokal (55.2% of those voting).

In the House of Representatives, he was deputy chairman of the Standing Committee on Economic Policy, and was a member of permanent delegations to interparliamentary organizations and interparliamentary commissions.

On 14 May 2017, Aliaksiej Sokal was elected first secretary of the Communist Party of Belarus (previously he was secretary of the Central Committee of the Communist Party of Belarus), following the results of the VI Plenum of the Central Committee. The head of the party, Ihar Karpienka, has been relieved of his duties due to a significantly increased workload as the Minister of Education of Belarus. Hieorhij Atamanaŭ became the second secretary of the Central Committee.

On 15 March 2021, he became a member of the Constitutional Commission, which, in order to implement the resolution of the Sixth All-Belarusian People's Assembly, develops proposals to amend the Constitution of Belarus and ensures their public discussion.

== State awards ==
He has a Letter of Gratitude from the President of the Republic of Belarus, was awarded a Certificate of Honor from the National Assembly of the Republic of Belarus and the Council of Ministers of the Republic of Belarus (2024), certificates of honor from the Minsk City Executive Committee and the Minsk City Council of Deputies.

== Personal life ==
He is married and has a son.
