= Pavel Sukhoi State Technical University of Gomel =

Public university in Gomel, Belarus

Coordinates: 52°24′25″N 30°56′18″E

Gomel State Technical University named after Pavel Sukhoi
- Гомельскі дзяржаўны тэхнічны ўніверсітэт імя П.В.Сухога
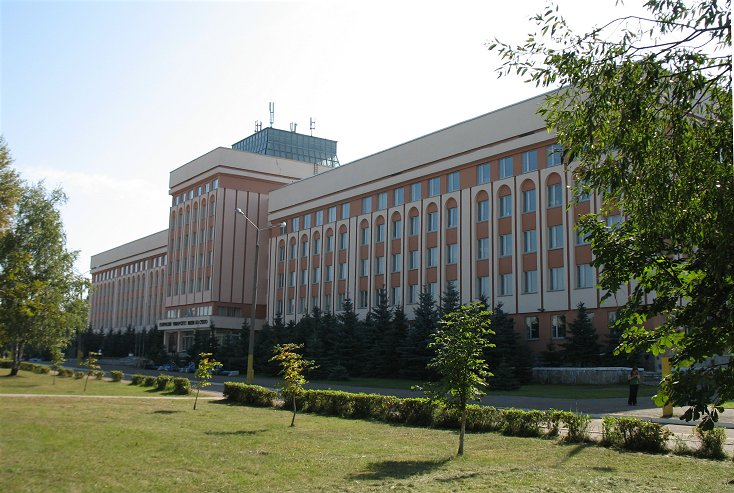
- Other names: Гомельский государственный технический университет имени П.О. Сухого
- Established: 1968
- Rector: Putyato Artur Vladimirovich
- Students: 9,000
- Location: Gomel, Belarus
- Website: en.gstu.by

Pavel Sukhoi State Technical University of Gomel is a university in Gomel, Belarus. The university is named after Pavel Sukhoi, Belarusian Soviet military aircraft constructor and designer. The University provides training for the graduation of engineering personnel and scientific qualification personnel for such branches of industry as mechanical engineering, metallurgy, power engineering, economy, radio electronic engineering and information technologies.

== History ==
In 1968, technical faculty was formed at Gomselmash agricultural machinery plant. In 1973 it became Gomel branch of Belarusian State Polytechnical Institute. In 1981 this branch became an independent institute and in 1998 the institute was reformed into technical university.

== Faculties ==
Economics and Humanities Faculty:

- Marketing
- Economy and Management at the Enterprise
- Economy and Organization of Production (by industries)

Mechanical Engineering Faculty:

- Engineering Technology
- Technological Equipment for Machine Building
- Hydro-Pneumatic Systems of Mobile and Technological Machines
- Development and Operation of Oil and Gas Fields
- Automation of Technological Processes and Productions

Technological Faculty:

- Casting Equipment and Technology
- Metallurgy Production and Material Working
- Equipment and Technology for Material Pressure Shaping
- Packing Manufacturing
- Design and Manufacture of Farming Equipment

Automation and Information Systems Faculty:

- Industrial Electronics
- Automation Electric Drive
- Information Systems and Technologies
- Information Science and Programming Technologies
- Information Technologies and Control in Engineering Systems

Power Engineering Faculty:

- Electric Power Supply
- Electric Power Systems and Networks
- Industrial Heat Power Engineering
- Operation of Electric Power Equipment of Organizations

== Living and recreation ==
The international students are provided with double or 3 bed rooms provided with all necessary facilities in students' hostels of block type.
