= Uładzimir Hančaryk =

Belarusian politician and pro-democracy activist

- Belarusian: Уладзімір Ганчарык; Russian: Владимир Гончарик
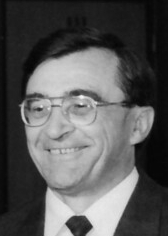

Personal details
- Born: Uładzimir Ivanavič Hančaryk; April 29, 1940 (age 86) Lahojsk, Soviet Union
- Party: CPSU (1964-1991)
- Education: Russian Academy of public administration Belarus State Economic University

Uładzimir Ivanavič Hančaryk or Vladimir Ivanovich Goncharik (Belarusian: Уладзімір Іванавіч Ганчарык, Russian: Владимир Иванович Гончарик; born 29 April 1940) is a Belarusian opposition politician.

== Early life ==
Hančaryk was born on 29 April 1940 in Lahojsk, a town outside of Minsk, in the Byelorussian SSR. During his childhood World War II was in its midst, and eventually his family lived in a dugout after their home caught on fire. His mother and father had five children, and his father was part of the partisans of the Minsk region before becoming part of a reconnaissance platoon. His father, Nikolai, was nearly killed for his activities and spent time in the forests before reuniting with the family, when soon afterward his mother was killed.

== Political career ==
Beginning in 1986, Hančaryk was a chairman of the Federation of Trade Unions of Belarus, which was then called the Belarusian National Council of Trade Unions.

Hančaryk was the only opposition candidate who stood against incumbent President Alexander Lukashenko in the 2001 Belarusian presidential election. His campaign was supported by fellow opposition candidate Siamion Domash, who withdrew his candidacy and urged his supporters to vote for Hančaryk. Many considered Hančaryk to be the best candidate for the opposition because of his previous government experience and his centrist stances. Hančaryk ultimately lost the election by Lukashenko by a sixty percent margin, according to official results from the Central Election Commission. However, the elections were considered fraudulent by independent observers.

Later on, commenting on the 2020 Belarusian presidential election, he stated that Viktar Babaryka was a strong candidate, adding that everyone was tired of Lukashenko and that the government was trying to smear the candidates.

== Sources ==
- 2001 Belarusian election profile
