= Igor Sergeenko =

Belarusian politician (born 1963)

- Игорь Сергеенко; Ігар Сергеенка
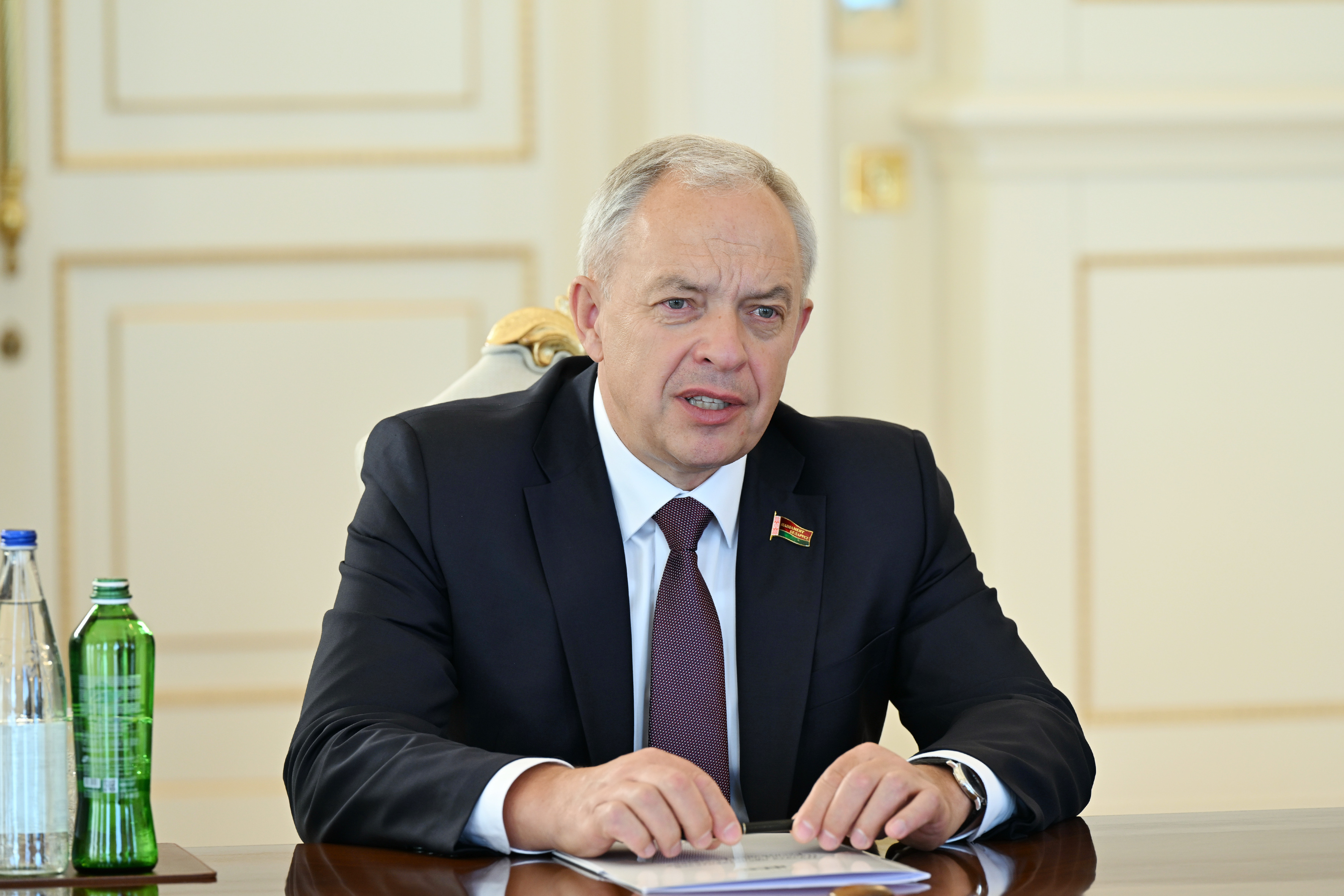
- Sergeenko in 2026

Speaker of the House of Representatives
- Incumbent
- Assumed office 22 March 2024
- Preceded by: Vladimir Andreichenko

Personal details
- Born: 14 January 1963 (age 63) Stolitsa, Miory district, Byelorussian SSR
- Education: Belarus State University; Academy of Public Administration; National Security Academy of Belarus

Igor Petrovich Sergeenko (Russian: Игорь Петрович Сергеенко; born 14 January 1963) is a Belarusian politician serving as speaker of the House of Representatives since 2024.

== Career ==
Sergeenko was born on 14 January 1963 in Stolitsa, which was located in the Vitebsk Region of the Belarusian SSR in the Soviet Union.

Sergeenko graduated from the Belarusian State University in 1984 and from the Presidential Academy of Public Administration in 2006. From 1984 to 1986 he served in the Soviet Army, and then he became Head of the Education and Methodological Office of the Department of History of the CPSU and Political Economy at Vitebsk State Medical Institute. He worked in the KGB since 1989. Sergeenko served as first deputy chairman of the State Security Committee from 2014 to 2019, and as head of the Presidential Administration from 2019 to 2024. He is a Major general.

In January 2010, he was appointed Head of the KGB Directorate for the Mogilev Region. He continued to serve in this role until 2013, when he was transferred and appointed First Deputy Chairman of the KGB. In 2019, President Alexander Lukashenko appointed him as Head of the Presidential Administration of Belarus, with Olga Chupris as his deputy head. In March 2024, he was appointed Chairman of the House of Representatives in a unanimous election, succeeding Vladimir Andreichenko who had held the post for 14 years. Sergeenko noted upon being elected that he would focus on issues in rural areas.

== International sanctions ==
Following the 2010 Belarusian presidential election, he was added to the sanctions list of the European Union in early 2011.

After the 2020 Belarusian presidential election Sergeenko was again sanctioned, first by the Baltic states, and later the same year by the United Kingdom, the European Union, Canada, Switzerland, and several EU-aligned countries.
