= 2001 Belarusian presidential election =

- 9 September 2001
- Registered: 7,356,343
- Turnout: 83.86% (▲4.89 pp)
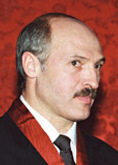

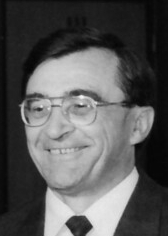
Nominee	Alexander Lukashenko	Uładzimir Hančaryk
Party	Independent	Independent
Popular vote	4,666,680	965,261
Percentage	77.39%	16.01%
- Results by region Lukashenko: 55–60% 75–80% 80–85% 85–90%
President before election
Alexander Lukashenko
Independent
Elected President
Alexander Lukashenko
Independent

Presidential elections were held in Belarus on 9 September 2001. The election should have been held in 1999, but a revised constitution adopted in 1996 extended incumbent Alexander Lukashenko's term for another two years.

Lukashenko was re-elected with 77.4% of the vote over two minor candidates. Voter turnout was 84%. A senior official for the Organization for Security and Co-operation in Europe noted that the pre-election environment was "not democratic" and would not describe it as "free and fair".

== Background ==
Lukashenko was elected as the first Belarusian president in 1994. He expanded the presidential powers in 1996 via referendum, which reset his term and shifted the next election from 1999 to 2001.

In the first seven years of his rule, Lukashenko established control over the media, economy, and all three branches of government. The period saw the physical disappearance of his political opponents, such as former Central Election Commission head Viktar Hanchar and former Minister of Internal Affairs Yury Zakharanka.

Ahead of the election, the opposition, with the assistance of the OSCE, unsuccessfully tried to negotiate a new electoral law with Lukashenko. The law passed in 2000 did not provide guaranteed seats for the opposition on the Central Election Commission and restricted the activities of election observers.

The election was influenced by the 1999 NATO bombing of Yugoslavia and the overthrow of Slobodan Milošević less than a year prior. Both themes were used in Lukashenko's campaign. In 2000, The Los Angeles Times described Lukashenko as "Europe's last dictator", a nickname previously applied to Milošević.

== Electoral system ==
The President of Belarus was elected for a five-year term. Candidates had to be natural-born citizens, at least 35 years old, and have lived in Belarus for at least 10 years preceding the election. The first requirement was introduced in the 1996 referendum.

Presidential elections used a two-round system. A candidate won in the first round if they received an absolute majority. If no candidate won, a second round was held between the two leading candidates. Voter turnout had to be at least 50% for the election to be valid.

Elections were overseen by the Central Election Commission of Belarus (CEC). To be registered, a candidate had to form an initiative group of at least 100 members to collect 100,000 signatures, which were submitted for verification.

== Candidates ==
Out of 22 initial candidacies, four withdrew their nominations. Among them was Natalia Masherova, daughter of Pyotr Masherov (leader of the Belarusian SSR from 1965–1980), who had previously polled at 22% in June compared to Lukashenko's 42%. Of the remaining candidates, 16 submitted the signatures they collected. Only four managed to gather the required 100,000 to be formally registered.

The opposition planned to have a single candidate. Among those who were considered for the role were Mikhail Chigir (former Prime Minister), Pavel Kozlovsky (ex-defense minister), Sergey Kalyakin (Communist party leader), Semyon Domash (former governor of Grodno), and Uładzimir Hančaryk (trade union leader). Only Domash and Hančaryk successfully gathered the required signatures. Domash withdrew his candidacy on August 22, just 18 days before the election, reportedly under pressure from the American ambassador Michael Kozak after being promised the position of Prime Minister in the event of an opposition victory.

Information on registered candidates
Candidate	Party	Position	Signatures
Sergei Gaidukevich	Liberal Democratic Party of Belarus	Chairman of the LDPB	136,126
Uładzimir Hančaryk	Independent	Chairman of the Federation of Trade Unions of Belarus	123,304
Siamion Domash	Independent	Chairman of the Council of Grodno Regional Public Association "Ratusha"	161,476
Alexander Lukashenko	Independent	President of the Republic of Belarus	396,380

== Campaign ==
=== Alexander Lukashenko ===
Lukashenko's campaign was centered around economic growth and stability. He said his rule avoided implementation of shock therapy, which brought poverty to citizens of Russia and Ukraine. Lukashenko promised to raise salaries to $250, double pensions, and lessen restrictions on businesses.

Regarding foreign policy, he supported further integration with Russia as part of the Union State, but said he remained open to cooperation with other countries. Lukashenko said the West was planning to remove him from power similar to Milošević. This rhetoric influenced the public; when asked to name at most three threats to Belarus, 41.7% named NATO, 25% said the US, and Russia was in third place with 7.2%.

The campaign relied on state media, which promoted Lukashenko, so he had no need to use electoral airtime. Lukashehnko held one public rally, which was attended by around 3,000 people in Minsk on September 4.

=== Uładzimir Hančaryk ===
Uładzimir Hančaryk, a 61-year-old trade union leader, was older than the other candidates. His communist background also made him a target for attacks. Hančaryk presented his age as a sign of experience; he also tried to connect with voters by portraying himself as an everyman.

His campaign centered on strengthening democratic institutions. He said he would establish an independent judiciary and weaken the presidency in favor of the cabinet and the parliament. Hančaryk accused Lukashenko's government of operating death squads tasked with the elimination of political opponents. Lukashenko responded by claiming these disappearances were staged by the opposition to blacken his reputation. Hančaryk tried to obtain Russian support and publicly appealed to Vladimir Putin to ensure the fairness of the elections, but his electoral base was still mostly pro-Western. He also expressed a desire for eventual European Union membership for Belarus.

The campaign maintained a low profile, with The New York Times describing him as "wooden." He held one rally, attracting 2,500 attendees in Minsk on September 3.

=== Sergei Gaidukevich ===
Sergei Gaidukevich was a fifteen-year veteran of the Soviet armed forces who reached the rank of colonel. He founded the Liberal Democratic Party of Belarus in 1992 by uniting 28 smaller parties and movements. It described itself as centrist and democratic, saying it was against both abstract market and communism.

Gaidukevich supported a broadly liberal economic platform. He criticized the dictatorship established by Lukashenko, saying it had brought all of society down to the same level. He also described his political rivals as "dinosaurs".

There was speculation that Gaidukevich's candidacy was a spoiler for Lukashenko, because his participation guaranteed at least one opposition candidate in the event of an election boycott, as had occurred in the 2000 parliamentary elections.

=== Media ===
Prior to the election, the government shut down the publishing house Magic Press, which printed 15 independent newspapers. Another publisher, Znameniye Publishers, was closed after it printed leaflets for Hančaryk.

Most media in the country were state-controlled; the government newspaper, Sovetskaya Belorussiya, had a circulation larger than a dozen of the largest independent outlets. It published an article in 600,000 copies describing alleged attempts by the West to subvert Belarus using the opposition.

Belarusian Television (BT), the only nationwide TV channel, dedicated 68% of its coverage to Lukashenko, while the opposition received negative coverage. However, only 37.2% of Belarusians watched it; the most popular channel was Russia's ORT, watched by 80.3% of the population. On the radio, the President received 65% of all coverage.

On election day, the government blocked access to opposition websites, including Hančaryk's campaign site. The phone lines of election-monitoring organizations were also shut down.

=== Foreign interference ===
In June, the head of the Russian Orthodox Church, Patriarch Alexius II, visited Belarus, where he said that Catholics were trying to divide the Orthodox believers. Russian President Vladimir Putin initially did not directly endorse any candidates. In July, he visited Belarus and met with Lukashenko. In the weeks prior to the election, Belarus was visited by the mayors of the two largest cities, Moscow and Saint Petersburg, and the leaders of Russian and Ukrainian communist parties. Two days before the election, Putin said that the idea of the Union State between Russia and Belarus originated with Lukashenko.

According to The New York Times, the Zubr movement, which organized multiple protests prior to the election, was assumed to be backed by the West. The outlet compared it to the Serbian Otpor that received American funding and played an important role in the removal of Milošević.

The Belarusian government expelled a representative of the American AFL–CIO labor organization, citing his alleged support for Hančaryk. Lukashenko also criticized OSCE representative Hans-Georg Wieck, a diplomat and former president of the German Federal Intelligence Service, who acted as an intermediary between the opposition and government. Belarusian TV claimed he worked to remove Lukashenko. According to Belarusian journalist Alyaksandr Feduta, Wieck was instrumental in selecting the unified opposition candidate.

The United States provided $12.41 million through the Freedom Support Act, specifically targeting the elections. This came from a larger estimated $37.78 million in overall aid given to Belarus prior to the event. Some estimates suggest the United States made a total of $50 million available for this election campaign.

== Opinion polls ==
State-owned polls predicted a first-round victory for Lukashenko, with projections ranging from 65-70% of the vote.

Before the election, NISEPI, a Belarusian pollster, tracked voter intention among the two main candidates, gathering the following data:

Willingness to vote for a candidate
	08.07	16.07	24.07	01.08	09.08	17.08	25.08	31.08	08.09
Lukashenko	40.6	40.7	42.3	43.3	44.1	43.6	44.0	49.7	46.8
Hančaryk	3.4	4.2	4.8	8.4	13.7	13.1	20.3	23.2	27.8

While Belarusian law prohibited exit polls, some organizations conducted post-election surveys of the electorate. A survey by NISEPI showed that 57.9% voted for Lukashenko and 24.5% for Hančaryk, 21% of those polled believed that election rigging altered the outcome. In April 2002, Office of Research reported that 61% voted for Lukashenko.

Calculated based on NISEPI post-election poll
Demographic subgroup	Gaidukevich	Hančaryk	Lukashenko	% of total vote
Total vote	4.0	29.1	66.9	100
Gender
Men	3.7	37.5	58.8	45.6
Women	4.3	22.9	72.8	54.4
Age
18–30 years old	6.5	46.5	47.0	22.4
30–50 years old	6.0	41.1	52.9	40
50 and older	1.2	11.2	87.6	37.5
Educational attainment
Less than general secondary	2.0	7.3	90.7	25.9
General secondary	4.6	36.8	58.6	36.5
Vocational or higher	4.6	44.0	51.4	37.6
Employment
Private	6.1	54.3	39.6	11.7
Public	4.7	33.5	61.7	47.8
Student	5.7	42.1	52.2	6.7
Retiree	1.6	6.7	91.6	27.8
Unemployed	6.5	35.1	58.4	5.8
Region
City of Minsk	4.6	43.2	52.2	16.7
Minsk	2.7	21.8	75.5	15.5
Brest	3.5	25.5	71.0	14.8
Grodno				
Vitebsk	4.3	31.5	64.2	13.7
Mogilev	7.6	30.3	62.1	12.1
Gomel	1.2	17.2	81.5	15.4
Area type
Capital	4.6	43.2	52.2	16.7
Oblast center	3.6	31.8	64.7	18.2
>50,000 pop.	5.7	32.2	62.1	15.8
<50,000 pop.	3.8	33.1	63.1	18.6
Rural	3.4	17.1	79.5	30.7
Self-assessment of one's financial situation
Poor/below average	3.0	16.3	80.7	22.7
Average	3.1	29.1	67.8	58.7
Better than average	9.2	50.3	40.4	17
Which form of property ownership is more efficient?
State	1.2	6.8	92.0	39.6
Private	6.9	50.4	42.7	55.6
Other	5.4	44.5	50.1	4.8

== Results ==
The Central Election Commission reported a 14.46% turnout for early voting, independent observers estimated it to be higher, at 22.83%. The election had 717 foreign observers and 21,887 domestic ones. However, they were regularly denied entrance to polling stations, gaining access to only 52% of them.

According to official results, Lukashenko won over half of the votes and won in the first round.

Candidate	Party	Votes	%
Alexander Lukashenko	Independent	4,666,680	77.39
Uładzimir Hančaryk	Independent	965,261	16.01
Sergei Gaidukevich	Liberal Democratic Party	153,199	2.54
Against all		245,241	4.07
Total		6,030,381	100.00
Valid votes		6,030,381	97.75
Invalid/blank votes		138,706	2.25
Total votes		6,169,087	100.00
Registered voters/turnout		7,356,343	83.86
Source: Nohlen & Stöver

=== Results by region ===
Region	Turnout	Gaidukevich	Hančaryk	Lukashenko
Brest	85.84%	2.44%	15.73%	76.17%
Vitebsk	84.67%	2.41%	12.76%	77.45%
Gomel	85.74%	1.76%	8.34%	85.00%
Grodno	85.67%	2.87%	15.08%	76.96%
Minsk	84.12%	2.32%	14.84%	76.56%
Mogilev	85.26%	2.17%	9.84%	83.03%
City of Minsk	77.59%	3.37%	30.5%	57.37%
Total	83.86%	2.48%	15.65%	75.65%
Source: Central Election Commission

== Aftermath ==
State TV declared Alexander Lukashenko the victor within an hour of polls closing, a result he termed "elegant". Hančaryk said he received 40% of the vote to Lukashenko's 47%, necessitating a second round. He called for a protest, but only about a thousand people gathered. Gaidukevich conceded, stating there was "no disgrace to be defeated by such an opponent".

Observers from Russia and the CIS deemed the election "free and fair". The OSCE mission said the election had "failed to meet international standards". A member of the OSCE said that early voting was unreliable and that all but 1% of electoral commission members were appointed by the government.

The following day, Vladimir Putin called Lukashenko to congratulate him. The U.S. State Department said that Lukashenko had failed to move away from isolation through free and fair elections and announced consultations with European partners on restoring democracy in Belarus. Two days after the election, the September 11 attacks happened, and international attention shifted away from Lukashenko.

Responding to critics, Lukashenko said that Belarus's election required no external recognition. In December 2001, Hančaryk was removed from his position as head of the Federation of Trade Unions of Belarus. He was succeeded by his deputy, who was later replaced in 2002 by Leonid Kozik, a member of the presidential administration.
