= Republican Party of Labour and Justice =

Belarusian political party

Republican Party of Labour and Justice Республиканская партия труда и справедливости Рэспубліканская партыя працы і справядлівасьці
- Abbreviation: RPTS (English); РПТС (Russian)
- Leader: Alexander Khizhnyak
- Founders: Anatol Niatylkin; Ihar Lučanok; Ivan Antanovich; Vladimir Gostyukhin; Jauhien Babosau
- Founded: 26 June 1993; 33 years ago
- Registered: 18 August 1994; 32 years ago
- Headquarters: 23th Building, Victors Avenue, Minsk, Belarus. 220004
- Membership (2013): 8,000
- Ideology: Democratic socialism; Social democracy; Pro-Lukashenko; Euroscepticism
- Political position: Centre-left
- National affiliation: RKSKPPGA
- Continental affiliation: Forum of Socialists of the CIS Countries
- Colours: Red, Green (official); Pink (customary)
- Slogan: «Labor. Justice. Responsibility.» (Russian: «Труд. Справедливость. Ответственность.»)
- House of Representatives: 8 / 110
- Council of the Republic: 0 / 64
- Local seats: 186 / 12,514

Website
- rpts.by

The Republican Party of Labour and Justice (Note: According to the website, the name of the party in English is Republican Labor and Justice Party) (Note: (RPTS; Russian: Республиканская партия труда и справедливости; РПТС, romanized: Respublikanskaya partiya truda i spravedlivosti; RPTS; Belarusian: Рэспубліканская партыя працы і справядлівасьці; РППС, romanized: Respublikanskaja partyja pracy i spraviadlivaści; RPPS)) is a political party in Belarus founded by Ivan Antonovich in 1993. The chairman is Vasil Zadnyaprany. The party is considered to be supportive of the government of president Alexander Lukashenko.

== Activities ==
Politispolkom, of the Republican Party of Labor and Justice, unanimously declared the results of the referendum on 16 March 2014 in the Crimea legitimate and supported the will of the inhabitants of Sevastopol. The party has also called for the president Lukashenko to accept the results of the referendum.

At the extraordinary XIII Congress of the Republican Party of Labor and Justice, held on 12 December 2020, Vasily Zadnepryany, who had headed the RPTS since 2006, was expelled from its members. Alexander Alexandrovich Stepanov became the acting chairman of the RPTS.

== Electoral performance ==
At the Belarusian parliamentary election in 1995, the party obtained 1 out of 198 seats. At the legislative election in 2000, it gained 2 out of 110 seats in the House of Representatives. The following elections in 2004 and 2008 were not successful for the party; however, in 2012, it won one seat.

As a result of elections to the local Councils of Deputies of the Republic of Belarus (2014), 36 people were elected. Two members of the party are members of the Minsk City Council of Deputies.

In the 2019 Belarusian parliamentary election, it won a total of 6 seats to Belarus' House of Representatives.

=== Presidential elections ===
Election	Candidate	First round		Second round		Result
Election	Candidate	Votes	%	Votes	%	Result
1994	Endorsed Alexander Lukashenko	2,646,140	44.82%	4,241,026	80.34%	Elected ✓
2001	Endorsed Alexander Lukashenko	4,666,680	75.65%			Elected ✓
2006	Endorsed Alexander Lukashenko	5,501,249	82.97%			Elected ✓
2010	Endorsed Alexander Lukashenko	5,130,557	79.65%			Elected ✓
2015	Endorsed Alexander Lukashenko	5,102,478	83.47%			Elected ✓
2020	Endorsed Alexander Lukashenko	4,661,075	80.10%			Elected ✓
2025	Alexander Khizhnyak	102,789	1.75%			Lost ✗

=== Legislative elections ===
Election	Party leader	Performance					Rank	Government
Election	Party leader	Votes	%	± pp	Seats	+/–	Rank	Government
1995	Anatol Niatylkin	No data			1 / 260	New	13th	Support
2000	Anatol Niatylkin	No data			2 / 110	▲1	▲3rd	Support
2004	Viktar Sakaloŭ	No data			0 / 110	▼2	▼10th	Extra-parliamentary
2008	Vasil Zadnyaprany	22,763	0.42%	New	0 / 110	0	▲7th	Extra-parliamentary
2012	Vasil Zadnyaprany	79,078	1.51%	▲1.09	1 / 110	▲1	▲4th	Support
2016	Vasil Zadnyaprany	147,378	2.87%	▲1.36	3 / 110	▲2	▲3rd	Support
2019	Vasil Zadnyaprany	355,971	6.75%	▲3.88	6 / 110	▲3	▲2nd	Support
2024	Alexander Khizhnyak				8 / 110	▲2	▲2nd	Support
