= Vladimir Andreichenko =

Belarusian agronomist and politician

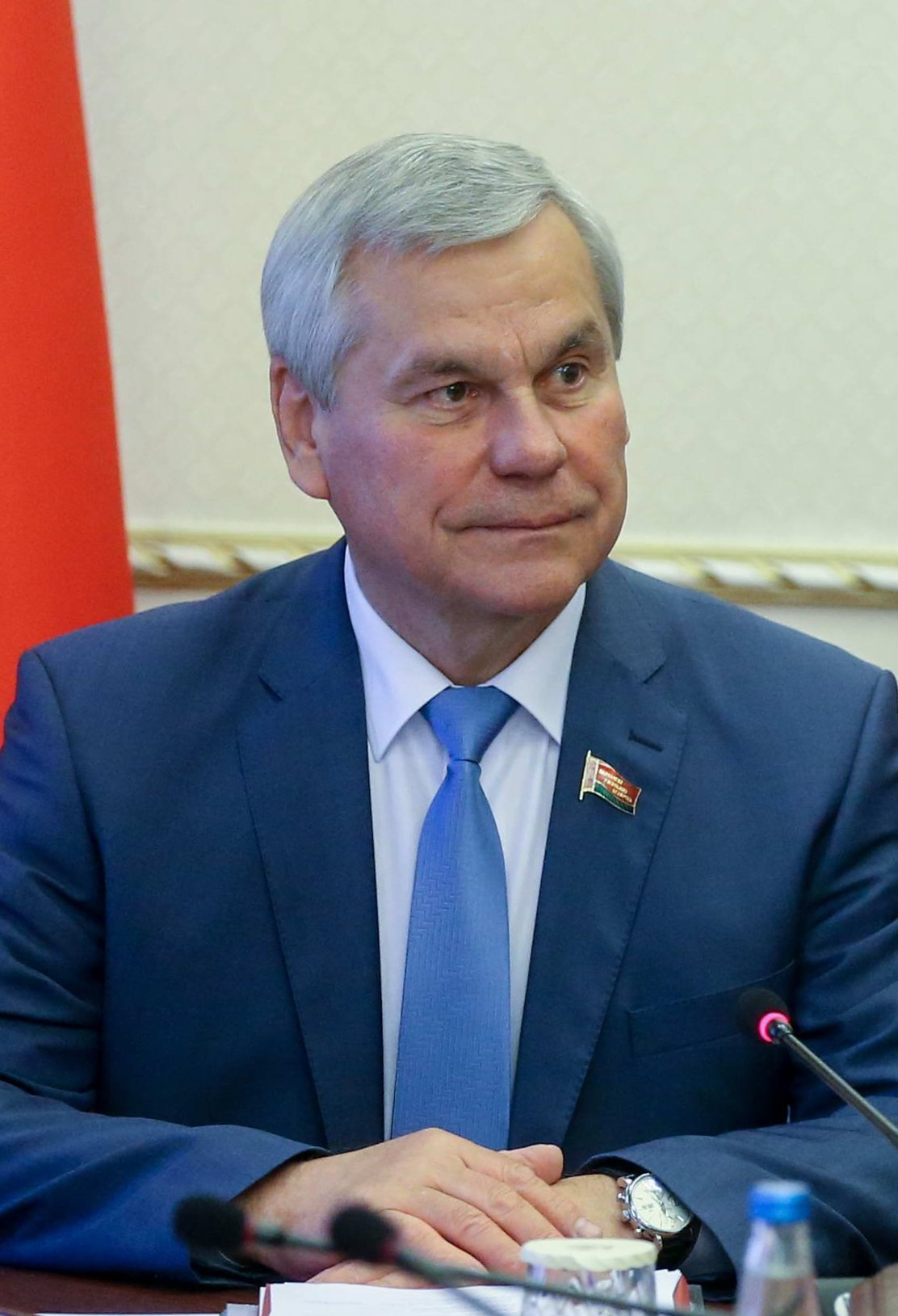
Andreichenko in 2019

Vladimir Pavlovich Andriejczenko (Belarusian: Уладзімір Паўлавіч Андрэйчанка; Russian: Владимир Павлович Андрейченко; born 2 January 1949) is a Belarusian agronomist and politician who was Chair of the House of Representatives from October 2008 to March 2024.

== Early life ==
Andreichenko was born on 2 January 1949 in the village of Marjanova, which was part of the Lyozna district in the Byelorussian SSR when he was born. In 1968 he graduated from the Luzhesno (Vitebsk district) Technical School of Sovkhoz. In 1968, he briefly worked as an agronomist of the collective farm "Victory of Socialism", before serving in the Soviet Army for two years.

== Political career ==
In 1972 he first entered politics, becoming an instructor and head of the organizational department of the Lyozna district committee of the Komsomol, and was also an instructor of the Lyozna district committee of the Communist Party of Belarus.

From October 2008 to March 2024 he was Chair of the House of Representatives, when he was replaced by Igor Sergeenko. He was previously Chairman of the Vitebsk Executive Committee from November 1994 until his election. During his time as chair, the Russian invasion of Ukraine started, and he subsequently criticized organizations that blocked Belarus, saying it was a "fictitious pretext" of supporting the war against Ukraine. He has also accused NATO's expansion, revolutions he stated were stirred by the west, and revisionism of World War II as helping start World War III. In 2019, he attended the 18th Summit of the Non-Aligned Movement.

He stated that after his retirement as chairman, he wanted to move back to Vitsebsk.

== Personal life ==
He owns a house in the village of Drazdy located near Minsk, which is where the majority of Alexander Lukashenko's associates live. His son, Vladislav, was General Director of the mobile operator company MTC. In 2024 he became director of the state-owned Minskintercaps.

== Sanctions ==
In December 2022, Andreichenko was added to the Canadian sanctions list.

== Honours and awards ==
- Order of the Fatherland, 1st degree
