= House of Representatives (Belarus) =

Lower house of the National Assembly of Belarus

Coordinates: 53°53′46″N 27°32′41.2″E

House of Representatives of the National Assembly of Belarus Палата Прадстаўнікоў Нацыянальнага сходу Рэспублікі Беларусь Палата представителей Национального собрания Республики Беларусь
- 8th House of Representatives of the National Assembly

Type
- Type: Lower house of the National Assembly of Belarus

History
- Founded: 1996
- Preceded by: Supreme Council of Belarus

Leadership
- Chairman: Igor Sergeenko, Independent since 22 March 2024
- Deputy Chairman: Vadim Ipatov since 22 March 2024

Structure
- Seats: 110
- Political groups: Government (91): Belaya Rus (51); Independent (40); Support (19): RPTS (8); Communist Party (7); LDPB (Note: The Liberal Democratic Party of Belarus asserts that it is an opposition party, but de facto supports the presidency of Alexander Lukashenko.) (4)
- Length of term: 5 years

Elections
- Voting system: First-past-the-post
- First election: 15 October 2000
- Last election: 25 February 2024

Meeting place
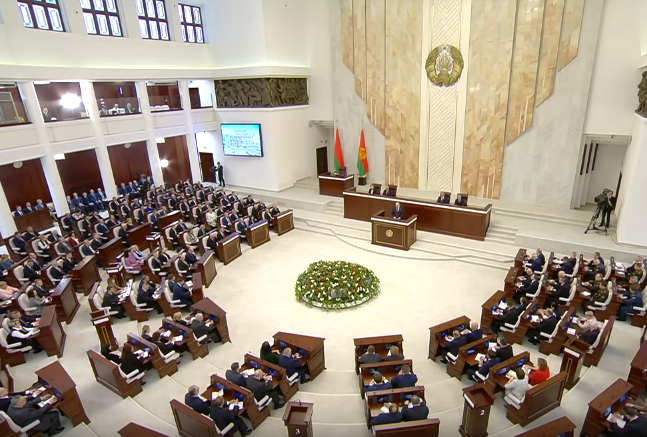

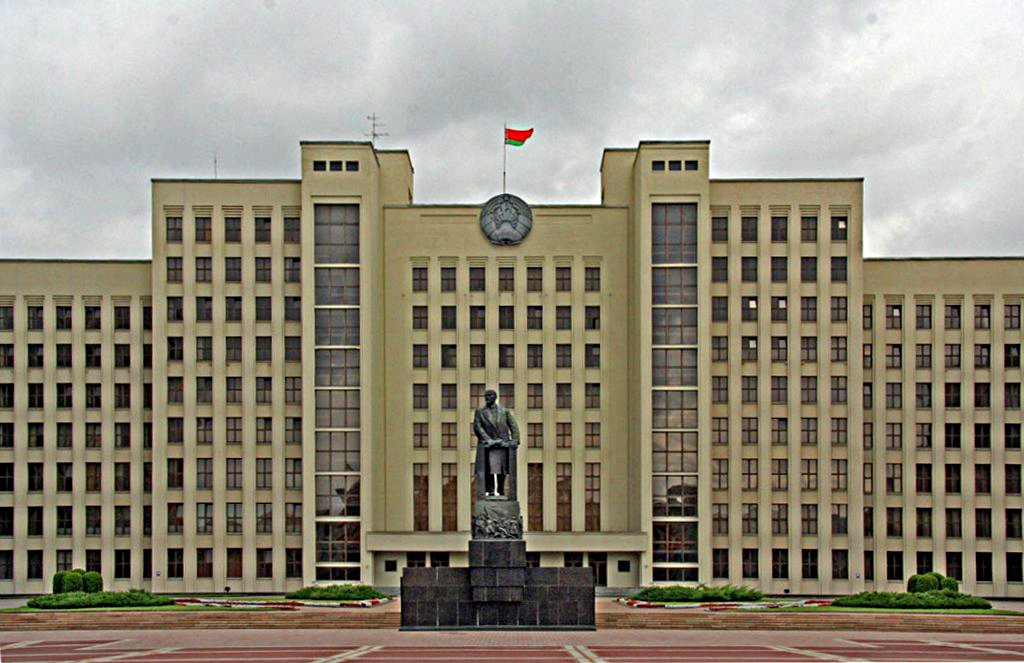
- Government House, Minsk

Website
- house.gov

The House of Representatives of the National Assembly of the Republic of Belarus (Note: Belarusian: Палата прадстаўнікоў Нацыянальнага сходу Рэспублікі Беларусь, romanized: Pałata pradstawnikow Nacyjanalnaha schodu Respubliki Biełaruś; Russian: Палата представителей Национального собрания Республики Беларусь, romanized: Palata predstaviteley Natsional'nogo sobraniya Respubliki Belarus') is the lower house of the parliament of Belarus, while the upper house is the Council of the Republic. It was established after the Constitution of Belarus was amended in 1996, replacing the Supreme Council of Belarus.

It consists of 110 deputies elected to four year terms on the basis of direct electoral suffrage by secret ballot (art. 91). It is a majoritarian system, with the outcome decided by overall majorities in single-member constituencies. Any citizen of 21 years is eligible for election (art. 92). The functions of the House are to consider draft laws and the other business of government; it must approve the nomination of a prime minister (art. 97); and it may deliver a vote of no confidence on the government (art. 97).

From 2000 until 2024, the majority of seats in the House of Representatives were held by independents: since 2024, Belaya Rus holds the most seats, although all the members are pro-Lukashenko.

== Powers ==
Bills adopted by the House of Representatives are sent to the Council of the Republic for consideration within five days, where they are considered within no more than twenty days.

Special powers accorded only to the House of Representatives are:

- consider draft laws put forward by the President or submitted by no less than 150 thousand eligible voters, to make amendments and alterations in the Constitution and give its interpretation;
- consider draft laws, including the guidelines of the domestic and foreign policy of the Republic of Belarus; the military doctrine; ratification and denunciation of international treaties;
- call elections for the Presidency;
- grant consent to the President concerning the appointment of the Prime minister;
- consider the report of the Prime minister on the policy of the Government and approve or reject it; a second rejection by the House of the policy of the Government is an expression of non-confidence to the Government.

Since constitutional amendments in 1996, the House of Representatives has little real power. Notably, the House has little control over government spending; it cannot pass a law to increase or decrease the budget without presidential consent. Additionally, if it rejects the president's nominee for prime minister two times, the president has the right to dissolve it. In practice, nearly all governing power is concentrated in the hands of President Alexander Lukashenko, and the House of Representatives does little more than approve the president's policies.

In the aftermath of the 2019 Belarusian parliamentary election, the Belarusian opposition lost all of its seats in the assembly, as every single elected deputy was deemed to support President Lukashenko. The House has been composed entirely of Lukashenko supporters for all but one term since 2004, and even before 2004 there had been little substantive opposition to presidential decisions.

== Speakers of the House of Representatives ==
Name	Entered office	Left office
Anatoly Malofeyev	28 December 1996	21 November 2002
Vadim Popov	21 November 2002	16 November 2004
Vladimir Konoplev	16 November 2004	2 October 2006
Vadim Popov	2 October 2006	27 October 2008
Vladimir Andreichenko	27 October 2008	22 March 2024
Igor Sergeenko	22 March 2024	Incumbent

== Fraction ==
(2019, 7th convocation).

Party	Number of Deputies		
Party	2012	2016	2019
Liberal Democratic Party	0	1	1
United Civic Party	0	1	0
BPF Party	0	0	0
Communist Party of Belarus	3	8	11
Belarusian Left Party "A Just World"	0	0	0
Belarusian Social Democratic Party (Assembly)	0	0	0
Republican Party of Labor and Justice	1	3	6
Belarusian Patriotic Party	0	3	1
Belarusian Green Party	0	0	0
Conservative Christian Party - BPF	0	0	0
Belarusian Social Democratic Assembly	0	0	0
Social Democratic Party of Popular Accord	0	0	0
Republican Party	0	0	0
Agrarian Party	1	0	1
Belarusian Socialist Sporting Party	0	0	0
Belarusian Liberal Party of Freedom and Progress	0	0	0
Belarusian Christian Democracy Party	0	0	0
Belarusian Party of Workers	0	0	0
Belarusian Social Democratic Party (People's Assembly)	0	0	0

== Historical composition ==
KPB / PKB / BPR / BPP / BAP / RPTS / PNZ / BSDH / PVES / Others / Independent / Vacant / PBR / APG / LDPB
1995	43 / 1 / 33 / 1 / 8 / 2 / 2 / 8 / 95 / 62 / 5
2000	6 / 5 / 2 / 2 / 94 / 1
2004	8 / 3 / 98 / 1
2008	6 / 1 / 103
2012	3 / 1 / 1 / 105
2016	8 / 3 / 3 / 94 / 1 / 1
2019	11 / 2 / 1 / 6 / 89 / 1
2024	7 / 8 / 40 / 51 / 4

== Members (since 1990) ==
- List of members of the Belarusian Parliament, 1990–95
- 1st House of Representatives of Belarus (1996–2000)
- 2nd House of Representatives of Belarus (2000–2004)
- 3rd House of Representatives of Belarus (2004–2008)
- 4th House of Representatives of Belarus (2008–2012)
- 5th House of Representatives of Belarus (2012–2016)
- 6th House of Representatives of Belarus (2016–2019)
- 7th House of Representatives of Belarus (2019–2024)
- 8th House of Representatives of Belarus (2024–2028)

== See also ==
- Politics of Belarus
- List of legislatures by country
