= 2014 Belarusian municipal elections =

Municipal elections in Belarus

- 23 March 2014
- Turnout: 77.4%
	First party	Second party	Third party
Party	Independent	Communist Party of Belarus	Republican Party of Labour and Justice
Seats won	18561	206	34
	Fourth party	Fifth party
Party	Belarusian Agrarian Party	Belarusian Socialist Sporting Party
Seats won	6	2
- Results of Local Councils of Deputies elections

27th convocation local councils of Republic of Belarus elections were held on 23 March 2014. 1328 Local Deputy Councils were filled with 18,816 representatives. Moreover, at the same time elections of single deputy to House of Representatives of National Assembly were held in Gomel-Navabielicki 36 electoral district where government-favoured candidate was removed from elections just before 2012 parliamentary election, and the only candidate left did not receive enough support.

The elections were held under plurality voting.

The last time significant representation of independent from executive power deputies in Councils could have been observed after 2003 Municipal elections, resulted in a lot of candidates from opposition UCP, BPF, Assembly parties elected. After that, 2007, 2010, 2014 elections resulted in only single elections to Councils of opposition parties representatives.

== General information ==
Alexander Lukashenko signed decree on holding elections on 16 December 2013. On 17 December CEC approved budget of expenditure for elections as BYR 100 billion (USD 10.5 million), having 60% of budget to be spent on electoral commissions reimbursements; deputy by-election in Gomel expenditures were set as high as BYR 1.25 billion (USD 130 thousand).

Out of 18,816 deputies of 1328 local Councils most represent rural councils:

- Rural councils — 1160 councils and 13,638 seats;
- Town councils — 19 councils and 237 seats;
- Local city councils — 14 councils and 248 seats;
- Regional city councils — 10 councils and 368 seats;
- District councils — 118 councils and 3913 seats;
- Regional councils and Minsk City Council — 7 councils and 412 seats.

On 8 December 2013, in a week before decree on holding elections signed, amendments to electoral legislation entered into effect, and upcoming elections were held under the new rules. For example, agitation for elections boycott was prohibited; also candidates were obliged to print agitation materials at their own cost, however, limited to BYR 1.3 or 3.9 million (USD 135 or 405 respectively) depending on the council level.

== Candidates nomination. Electoral campaign ==
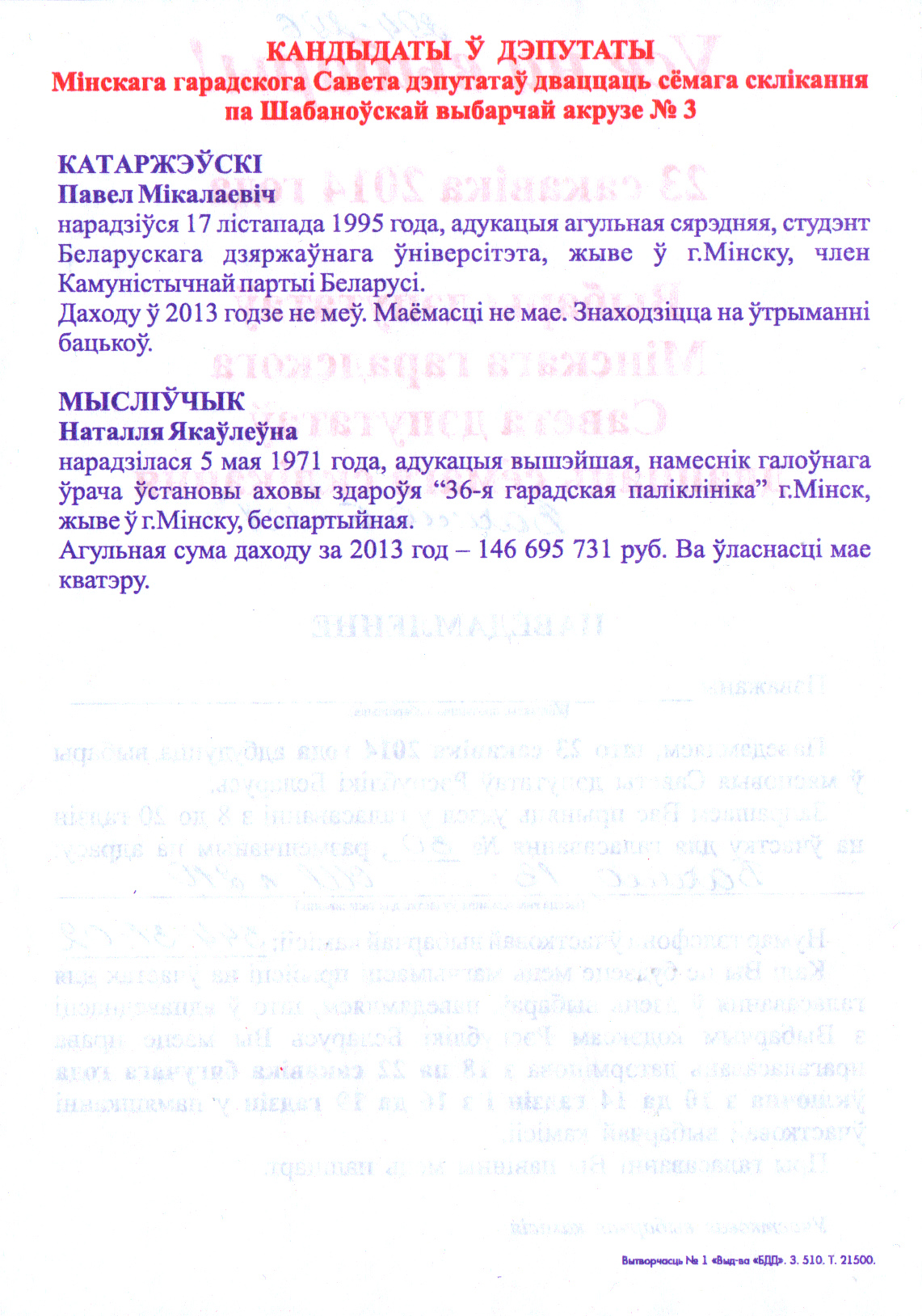
Reverse side of invitation, sent by mail. List of candidates in Shabany 3 electoral district of Minsk-city.

Deputy candidates nomination started on 12 January 2014 and went on till 10 February. Candidates registration was hold on 11–20 February; after the later the agitation campaign started and went on till 22 March. Preliminary voting was held on 18–22 March.

23,799 applications were provided for 18,816 seats, among which 22,784 were approved. Thus, there were on average 1,2 candidates for seat in total in Belarus. The lowest competition was for places in rural and town councils (1.1 candidate per seat), with a bit higher rate in local city councils (1.2) and district councils (1.3). Other councils had much higher competition: regional city councils — 2.1, regional councils — 2.3. The highest competition appeared to be in Minsk, where seats in 57 electoral districts were applied by 345 candidates, among which 270 registered, resulting in 4.7 candidate per seat.

80% of districts had non-alternative elections.

63,8% deputy candidates were nominated by citizens via signatures collection, 32,7% were nominated by workers' associations, 3,4% were nominated by political parties. Among other parties the most nominations were made by Communist Party of Belarus (277), Liberal Democratic Party of Belarus (159), Belarusian Left Party "A Just World" (119), United Civic Party of Belarus (111), Republican Party of Labour and Justice (51), Belarusian Social Democratic Party (Assembly) (50) and BPF Party (35).

47,3% candidates were acting local councils' deputies, with the share of women among candidates as large as 46,3%, citizens under 30 — 5,2%. The highest number of candidates worked in social sphere (education, culture, science, healthcare) — 28,2%, and agriculture — 22,7%. 11,8% of candidates worked in government authorities and institutions, and 9,7% in manufacturing, transport, and construction. However, among Minsk City Council candidates, 24,1% represent social sphere, 20,7% — manufacturing, transport, and construction, 16,3% — private businesses.

In Gomel-Navabielicki 36 electoral district 7 candidates contested single deputy seat in House of Representatives.

Under the Law "On the status of Local Council deputy" the Council deputy is responsible and reports to the voters. The Council deputy shall periodically, at least semi-annually report to the voters on his/her activities and progress with electoral programme implementation.

== Elections process. Turnout ==
On 18–21 March 24,92% Belarusians voted preliminary. According to human rights advocates and independent observers, практикуется vote enforcement was imposed during municipal elections to students, state institutions employees and military servicemen.

In total, 5,591,103 people, or 77,3% voters participated in elections, taking into account preliminary election.

== Incidents and events ==
- Upon the end of deputy candidates registration one of the candidates died leaving the district with no other candidates to participate.

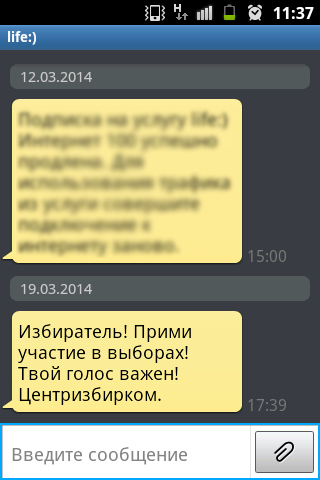
Below — SMS from provider inviting to elections on behalf of CEC. Text: "Voter! Participate in elections! Your vote matters! CEC."

- On 19 March CEC started sending SMS with call to come for elections via all three mobile service providers (see photo).
- Ballots with no entries were printed for Brest City Council elections.
- In Lahoysk an independent observer, who passed the accreditation, was not let to the voting station.
- On 21 March a candidate from United Civic Party of Belarus was detained in Minsk near "Traktarny zavod" metro station and transported to Partyzanski DDIA for giving away invitations to legal meeting with voters.
- В Pinsk agitation to participate in elections were located on ATMs.
- In Mikashevichy, Brest Region an independent candidate was prohibited to hold meeting with voters in the only officially authorized location. The prohibition was imposed by the head of Mikashevichy City Executive Committee, who participated in the elections himself.
- On 16 March 9 participants of campaign demonstration were detained in Minsk near Komarowka market: according to law enforcement version, they called for an election boycott. The head of United Civic Party of Belarus Anatoly Lebedko, who participated in demonstration, was sentenced to 15-days arrest (10 for «disturbance of public meetings», and 5 for «disorderly conduct»), four other participants were sentenced to 10-days arrest (only for «disturbance of public meetings»), two other were fined.

== Results ==
Elections took place in 18,809 districts, in 7 other districts re-elections were appointed: in 3 districts no candidate received majority vote, in 4 districts elections did not take place due to absence of candidates.

4 pro-presidential parties succeeded. Agrarian Party (Belarus) (6), Belarusian Socialist Sporting Party (2), Communist Party of Belarus (206), Republican Party of Labour and Justice (34).

Agrarian Party (Belarus) 6 deputies (0.03% of total number.)

Belarusian Socialist Sporting Party 2 deputies (0,01% of total number.)

Communist Party of Belarus 206 deputies (1,1% of total number.)

Republican Party of Labour and Justice 34 deputies (0,2% of total number.)

Party	Candidates nominated	Deputies elected
Liberal Democratic Party	125	0
United Civic Party of Belarus	67	0
BPF Party	42	0
Communist Party of Belarus	308	206
Belarusian Left Party "A Just World"	85	0
Belarusian Social Democratic Party (Assembly)	44	0
Republican Party of Labour and Justice	64	34
Belarusian Patriotic Party	3	0
Belarusian Green Party	0	0
Conservative Christian Party – BPF	0	0
Party "Belarusian Social Democratic Assembly"	0	0
Social Democratic Party of Popular Accord	3	0
Republican Party	0	0
Agrarian Party (Belarus)	6	6
Belarusian Socialist Sporting Party	3	2
Party of Freedom and Progress	0	0
Belarusian Christian Democracy Party	0	0
Belarusian Labourer Party	0	0
Belarusian Social Democratic Party (People's Assembly)	0	0

== Assessments ==
- On 18 March BPF Party reported an interim elections assessment, pointing a number of organizational violations:

«...withdrawal of printed agitation materials of candidates; low-quality production of printed agitation materials; unjustified agitators detention, including candidates detention; obstruction of media use by opposition candidates; electoral commissions spread of inconsistent information on candidates' criminal record, including publication of scandalous reports on candidates with no criminal conviction; unjustified withdrawal of candidate registration, and unjustified rejections to register candidates»

- On 20 March independent observers from "Human rights advocates for free elections" campaign mentioned vote enforcement with use of administrative power, significant (tenfold in some voting stations) inconsistency of preliminary vote turnout in protocols with real observations, as well as obstruction of observers' activities.
- Public campaign "Right to choose" declared mass manipulations with turnover, untransparent votes count and voting procedure violations.
- Representatives of "Monitoring elections: theory and practice" campaign declared a lot of violations observed during elections.
- Independent observers continually registered significant (up to 500 people) excess of protocolled turnover over real.

== Links ==
- СВЕДЕНИЯ о составе избранных депутатов местных Советов 27 созыва (in Russian - INFO on 27th convocation Local Councils' deputies composition)
- Выборы 23 марта 2014 года на сайте Центральной комиссии Республики Беларусь по выборам и проведению республиканских референдумов (in Russian - 23 March 2014 Elections on Central Commission of Republic of Belarus on elections and republican referendums organization)
