= 2007 Belarusian municipal elections =

Municipal elections in Belarus

2007 Local councils of Republic of Belarus elections
- 14 January 2007

2007 25th convocation local councils of Republic of Belarus elections were held on 14 January.

== General information ==
Elections were organized by 1581 territorial committees — 6 regional and Minsk urban, 118 districtal, 13 urban in regional cities, 14 urban in districtal cities, 66 town and 1363 rural committees. Members of 45 political parties participated in committees. 30 October 2006 was a due date for commissions formation. In a single day of 14 January 2007 25th convocation rural, as well as district, urban and regional Concils of deputies election were hold under plurality voting. 22639 deputies were elected. According to official data voters participation was 79% all over the Republic and 60% in Minsk-city.

== Participation of parties and candidates nomination ==
Candidates nomination started from 5 November till 4 December 2006.

Party	Deputies elected
Liberal Democratic Party	62
United Civic Party of Belarus	68
BPF Party	69
Communist Party of Belarus	239
Belarusian Left Party "A Just World"	22
Belarusian Social Democratic Party (Assembly)	44
Republican Party of Labour and Justice	14
Belarusian Patriotic Party	1
Belarusian Green Party	0
Conservative Christian Party – BPF	10
Party "Belarusian Social Democratic Assembly"	0
Social Democratic Party of Popular Accord	0
Republican Party	0
Agrarian Party (Belarus)	5
Belarusian Socialist Sporting Party	1
Party of Freedom and Progress	0
Belarusian Christian Democracy Party	0
Belarusian Labourer Party	0
Belarusian Social Democratic Party (People's Assembly)	0

== Sources ==
- "Кандидатами в депутаты местных советов зарегистрированы 535 представителей политических партий | naviny.by". naviny.media. Archived from the original on October 17, 2020.
- Иван (2011-08-04). "CООБЩЕНИЕ: Центральной комиссии Республики Беларусь по выборам и проведению республиканских референдумов 18 января 2007 г." (PDF).
