= 2010 Belarusian municipal elections =

Municipal elections in Belarus

2010 Local councils of Republic of Belarus elections
- 25 April 2010

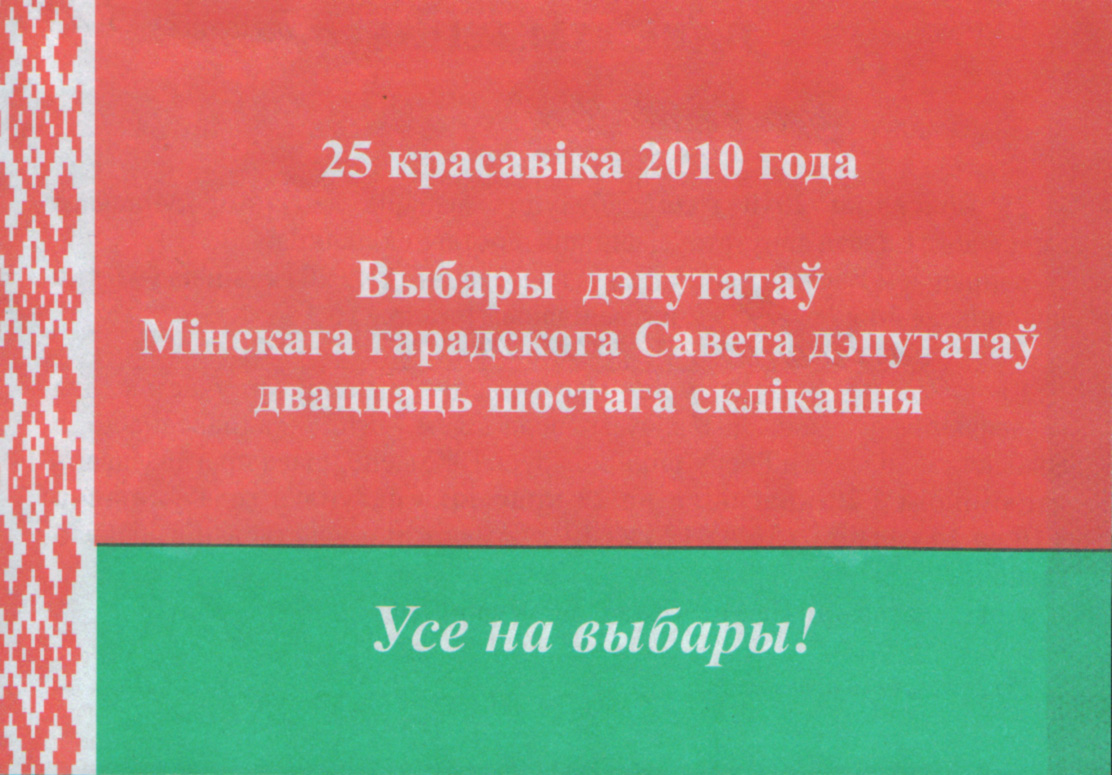
Invitation to elections. Text: «25 April 2010. 26th convocation Minsk city council deputies elections. Everyone to elections!»

2010 26th convocation local councils of Republic of Belarus elections were held on 25 April.

== General information ==
Elections to rural, as well as district, urban and regional Councils of deputies were held in a single day 25 April under plurality vote.

Under legislation any citizen of age 18 and older, living or working on the territory of municipal unit or connected with it is entitled to participate in municipal elections as a candidate.

== Elections preparations ==
According to preliminary information, 25 033 candidates are to participate in municipal elections, at least 513 of whom are candidates nominated by parties. In total, under some estimations, 700–800 candidates are to represent registered and unregistered opposition parties and movements. At the same time, United Civic Party of Belarus in its summit on 21 March decided not to participate in the elections. On 2 April representatives of "For free entrepreneurship development" movement gave up participation in the elections, however candidates from "Entrepreneurs bloc" continued their participation in the elections, as well as many young candidates, participating in the elections for the first time. However, there was no mass boycott of the elections and even UCP candidates participated in the elections till the end, with only a few of them withdrawing their nominations or were removed for electoral agitation rules violations.

Average competition rate in Minsk City Council of Deputies was 3.9 candidates per seat, while in regional councils – 1.8 candidates per seat. On average there were 1.2 candidates per deputy seat. Only 12 out of 40 electoral districts were alternative in Vitebsk City Council elections, in Gomel Regional Council — 36 out of 60, only in case of Minsk City Council of Deputies candidates nominated and participated, and there was no non-alternative district in Minsk.

Only 0.1% of polling site commissions staff was formed of opposition representatives.

On 20 April preliminary voting started; as of 23 April 15% of total number of voters had voted. Total turnover of the preliminary elections was 29.3%. At the same time, high numbers of preliminary voters provided by Central Electoral Committee are under doubt. There are also many evidences of university students being forced to vote preliminary.

However, according to CEC representatives high turnover on preliminary elections is observed and explained due to «not only informational work, but also organizational stimulation for citizens, wishing to vote preliminary in the cities», also they stated such reasons as high discipline of Belarusians and elderly people's desire to «realize their right to vote in a fine weather».

== Opinion polls ==
According to poll, conducted by Information and Analytics Center of President Administration of Republic of Belarus,

...for most of citizens the most appropriate is deputy candidate to Local Council aged 30–49, willing to help his region, working as manager or specialist of an enterprise or organization, representative of state authority and supporting current government

== Other events ==
- On the session of Brest Regional Electoral Commission independent candidate proved the fact of documents falsification by Baranavichy city commission, resulting in his complaint been taken into account, and he was registered as a candidate;
- European Union in the person of High Representative for Foreign Affairs and Security Policy Catherine Ashton declared an intent to thoroughly monitor the elections process;
- There was at least one district, with no deputy candidate;
- Giving away of balloons by one of the candidates to Vitebsk regional and city Councils of deputies was treated as vote buying and led to candidate's registration cancellation, while student amateur performances in electoral campaign of other candidate, university warden, was not treated as rules violation;
- On 23 April someone distributed flyers with provocative calls on behalf of BPF Party и BSDP(A) in Brest.
- For the first time in Belarus some candidates used the Internet and constantly contacted voters through websites, blogs, social networks.

== Results ==
- Resulting from elections, 11,186 out of 21,288 elected deputies were re-elected. Less than 10 representatives of opposition parties and movements managed to be elected to Councils.
- In Minsk elections resulted in absolute victory of one of the candidates, getting several times more votes than the second place, only in one district the second best candidate lagged only a few percentage points.
- The turnover appeared 79.1%:

Region	Voted	%
Brest Region	801,842	78.7%
Vitebsk Region	813,530	90.9%
Gomel Region	937,219	84.4%
Grodno Region	649,405	80.6%
Mogilev Region	719,960	85.7%
Minsk Region	903,346	81.7%
Minsk	735,116	58.7%

Party	Candidates nominated	Deputies elected
Liberal Democratic Party	61	1
United Civic Party of Belarus	97	0
BPF Party	35	0
Communist Party of Belarus	208	265*
Belarusian Left Party "A Just World"	126	2
Belarusian Social Democratic Party (Assembly)	32	1
Republican Party of Labour and Justice	18	6
Belarusian Patriotic Party	1	1
Belarusian Green Party	5	0
Conservative Christian Party – BPF	0	0
Party "Belarusian Social Democratic Assembly"	2	0
Social Democratic Party of Popular Accord	0	0
Republican Party	1	0
Agrarian Party (Belarus)	7	28*
Belarusian Socialist Sporting Party	2	2
Party of Freedom and Progress	0	0
Belarusian Christian Democracy Party	0	0
Belarusian Labourer Party	0	0
Belarusian Social Democratic Party (People's Assembly)	0	0

Out of 79 candidates of Belarusian Left Party "A Just World" 5 became local councils deputies, informed Valeriy Ukhnalev, deputy head of the party. (see source http://nashaniva.by/?c=ar&i=37802)

- On 29 April Parliamentary Assembly of the Council of Europe suspended all high-level contacts with the Government and National Assembly of Republic of Belarus due to the situation of the Polish minority, municipal elections and death penalty.

== Sources ==
- "Выборы в местные Советы депутатов Республики Беларусь (In Russian – Local councils deputies elections in Republic of Belarus". Central Electoral Commission of Republic of Belarus. Archived from the original on 29 April 2010.
- Выборы 2010 года в проекте «Выборы в Беларуси» (In Russian – 2010 Elections in project "Elections in Belarus")
- Правовая информация о выборах (In Russian – Legal information on elections)
- Новости избирательной кампании (In Russian – News on electoral campaign)
- Отчёт о независимом мониторинге выборов (In Russian – Report on independent elections monitoring)
