= 2003 Belarusian municipal elections =

Municipal elections in Belarus

2003 Local councils of Republic of Belarus elections
- 2 March 2003

2003 24th convocation local councils of Republic of Belarus elections were held on 2 March.

== General information ==
24th convocation local councils of Republic of Belarus elections were held on 2 March 2003 under plurality voting. Official turnover was 73.4%. 23469 deputies of all levels were elected.

== Results ==
Party	Deputies elected
Liberal Democratic Party	5
United Civic Party of Belarus	8
BPF Party	8
Communist Party of Belarus	107
Belarusian Left Party "A Just World"	78
Belarusian Social Democratic Party (Assembly)	0
Republican Party of Labour and Justice	0
Belarusian Patriotic Party	3
Belarusian Green Party	0
Conservative Christian Party – BPF	0
Party "Belarusian Social Democratic Assembly"	0
Social Democratic Party of Popular Accord	0
Republican Party	0
Agrarian Party (Belarus)	39
Belarusian Socialist Sporting Party	1
Party of Freedom and Progress	0
Belarusian Christian Democracy Party	0
Belarusian Labourer Party	1
Belarusian Social Democratic Party (People's Assembly)	6
