= Civil Forum =

Belarusian youth organization

Civil Forum РГМA "Грaмaдзянскi фopум"
- Chairperson: Ryta Savitskaya
- Founded: 1996
- Headquarters: 212030, Leninskaja Str. 29-2 Mogilev, Belarus
- Ideology: Liberalism
- Mother party: Belarusian Liberal Party of Freedom and Progress (PFP)
- International affiliation: International Federation of Liberal and Radical Youth (IFLRY)
- European affiliation: European Liberal Youth (LYMEC)
- Website: civilforum.by

Belarusian Liberal Youth Organization "Civil Forum" (Belarusian: Рэспубліканская грамадская моладзевая арганізацыя "Гpaмадзянскі форум", Russian: Республиканская молодежная организация "Гpaжданский форум") is the only Belarusian liberal youth organization and the only democratic youth organization with the legal status on national level (it was registered by the Ministry of Justice of Belarus in 1996). Civil Forum acts in order to bring closer the day when elections in Belarus are free from frauds, when liberal rights and freedoms of individuals are not repressed by the government, when citizens are free to speak and act without fear of being imprisoned by political and ideological reasons, when Belarus is the sustainable, responsible and peaceable partner in the Eastern-European region.

== History and leadership ==
Civil Forum was created in 1995 and registered in 1996 as the youth wing of the United Civil Party of Belarus (UCP) by the chairman of the Mogilev UCP branch Vladimir Novosiad. Civil Forum became independent from the UCP after UCP changed its ideology from liberal to conservative (Liberal conservatism) and refused to participate in the Parliament election (2000) despite the position of the party youth.

Civil Forum participated in 2000 elections nominating its President Vladimir Novosiad at the Kupalauski constituency in Minsk. After winning of Vladimir Novosiad in the elections Civil Forum members developed and started lobbying at the Belarusian Parliament draft-laws on alternative military service, on citizens savings etc.

Having its own MP provided Civil Forum with the possibilities of the organizing youth events in all regions of Belarus, sending official MP requests and other means of activities. Therefore, since 2001 Civil Forum started to be the leading democratic organization in Belarus.

In 2002 part of Civil Forum members initiating creation of the first liberal party in Belarus - Party of Freedom and Progress.

Minsk city organization member Vadzim Akhremka was elected as chairman of Civil Forum and brought new team into leadership of Civil Forum in 2005.

Repressions against Chairman Vadzim Akhremka, vice-chairmen, and some members of the Central Council preceding President elections (2006) knocked out the new Civil Forum leadership from their activities in organization. That provoked the crisis in organization of late 2006 - early 2007. Central Auditing Commission of Civil Forum approved the crises overcoming plan according to which the conferences of the regional organizations were convened and the Congress was called.

The Congress assembled on 28 November 2007 was to solve the leadership issue. The member of the Central Auditing Commission Sergey Vаrаnkеvіch was elected to the position of the Civil Forum Chairman. New Central Council of Civil Forum composition was also elected.

At the Congress on 4 November 2012 Hanna Ivashkеvіch was elected to the position of the Civil Forum Chairman.

At the Congress on 2 November 2014 Yury Stukalau was elected to the position of the Civil Forum Chairman. He was re-elected as chairman in 2016 and 2018.

At the October Congress 2020 the second time in history of the organization woman was elected as chairperson. New chairperson became Ryta Savitskaya from Grodno city organization.

== Membership ==
In accordance with Statutes (Art.3.1) Civil Forum membership can be granted to anyone, whose age is between 16 and 31, who lives in Belarus, shares the goals of Civil Forum, accepts its program and fulfills the requirements of the statutes. Middle-age of Civil Forum members is about 25 years old. Most of members are students and young professionals who accept liberal goals and wish to force democratic processes have been just started in Belarus. Civil Forum is represented in 6 of 7 Belarusian regions: Mogilev, Gomel, Grodno, Vitebsk, Minsk regions and Minsk city (with regional status).

== Activities ==
Civil Forum holds seminars, conferences and trainings for its members, as well as cultural and sports events, and organizes youth camps and role plays, study circles and debates. Many events are aimed to teach young people proper election technics. Also, the activity of the organization includes protection of the students’ rights. For example, on 27 August 2006 Civil Forum received a formal notice for publishing in the “Molodezhni Prospekt” (“Youth Avenue”, the organization's newspaper) articles on the students’ bad housing conditions. During the reading of the draft bill on the depriving students of some of the social guarantees, Civil Forum together with Belarusian students conducted a campaign “Help MP to Count”. After wide post-election repressions in 2020 Civil Forum initiated Statement on persecution of academic freedoms and students rights in Belarus which signed the biggest youth organizations in the country - Молодые демократы, Young social-democrats-Young Hramada, Young Christian-Democrats, Dobraja Volja, ABF Belarus, Dzedich.

Annually the organization and its regional offices carry through a range of events, devoted to the Magdeburg Law, among which are contest for the best essay among school pupils, Oxford debates and information distribution.

From the time it was founded, Civil Forum has been taking an active part in election campaigns.

campaigns	Nomination signatures collected (approx.)	Civil Forum members nominated	Mother Party of Freedom and Progress nominees
Local elections 1998	no records	1 (in Minsk)	-
Parliament elections 2000	no records	1 (in Minsk)	-
President elections 2001	25000	-	-
Local elections 2003	1400	15 (2 in Minsk, 4 in Mogilev, 1 in Bobruisk, 1 in Bialynichy, 2 in Gorki, 2 in Grodno, 1 in Byhau, 1 in Pruzhany, [1 in Lida)	-
Parliament elections and national referendum 2004	15000	1 (in Bobruisk)	3 (1 in Minsk, 1 in Mogilev, 1 in Grodno)
President elections 2006	14000 (together with the mother party)	-	-
Local elections 2007	8800	4 (2 in Minsk, 1 in Bobruisk, 1 in Grodno)	13 (4 in Minsk, 4 in Bobruisk, 5 in Gomel)
Parliament elections 2008	9200	1 (in Bobruisk)	6 (2 in Minsk, 2 in Mogilev and 2 initiative groups not registered)
Local elections 2010	5000	17	21 (including Civil Forum members)
President elections 2010	35000 (together with the mother party)	(support for Ales Michalevic, Dzmitry Us, Mikola Statkevich)	(support for Ales Michalevic, Dzmitry Us, Mikola Statkevich)
Parliament elections 2012	5000	2 (in Minsk)	3 (in Minsk and Vitebsk)
Local elections 2014	no records	2 (in Mogilev and Krichev)	9 (in Mogilev, Misnk, Vitebsk)
President elections 2015	-	-	-
Parliament elections 2016	no records	3 (in Mogilev and Minsk)	4 (in Mogilev, Minsk, Vitebsk)
Local elections 2018	no records	3 (in Mogilev and Minsk)	7 (in Mogilev, Minsk, Vitebsk)
Parliament elections 2019	no records	1 (in Mogilev)	0
President elections 2020	no records	(support for democratic candidates Viktar Babaryka, Valery Tsepkalo, Sviatlana Tsikhanouskaya)	

During 2020 Belarusian presidential election Civil Forum held an active pro-democratic position. The organization initiated big civil campaign against the main pro-governmental newspaper Sovetskaya Belorussiya – Belarus' Segodnya accused it of political insult of Belarusians voted for alternative candidates. The independent observation mission during Presidential elections organized by Civil Forum and covering 40 election polls was the biggest young independent observation mission in Belarus. Observers detected big amount of violations on the election polls and published official report about it.

== International cooperation ==
In order to achieve its aims Civil Forum cooperates with international and foreign organizations on the principles of equality and mutual respect. The majority organizations Civil Forum cooperates with are based on liberal and democratic ideas. Local organizations of "Civil Forum" can participate in international cooperation sui juris only after the endorsement of the Chairman or Central Council of Civil Forum (Articles 4.20 and 4.22 of the Statutes).

After the termination of connection with conservative United Civil Party of Belarus (UCP) in 2001 and final determination of the liberal orientation in its statutory documents Civil Forum left conservative international organizations it was member in and started integration in the world and European liberal associations. Civil Forum became the full member organization of International Federation of Liberal Youth (IFLRY) (since 2003) and European Liberal Youth (LYMEC) (applicant membership since 2004 and full membership since 2008). Since 2012 Civil Forum has been taken active part in Erasmus Programme youth exchanges. Since 2014 - in social youth projects of Council of Europe.
