= Party of Freedom and Progress =

Party of Freedom and Progress Партыя свабоды і прагрэсу Партия свободы и прогресса
- Abbreviation: PSP
- Leader: Uładzimier Navasiad
- Founded: 22 November 2003
- Split from: United Civic Party
- Preceded by: Civil Forum
- Headquarters: Minsk
- Youth wing: Civil Forum
- Ideology: Liberalism; Pro-Europeanism
- Political position: Centre
- European affiliation: Alliance of Liberals and Democrats for Europe Party (observer)
- Colours: Blue

Website
- liberaly.org

The Party of Freedom and Progress (PSP; Belarusian: Партыя свабоды і прагрэсу, romanized: Partyja svabody i prahresu; Russian: Партия свободы и прогресса, romanized: Partiya svobody i progressa) is a liberal political party in Belarus. Since 2003, it has continuously failed to reach the minimum threshold to get an official registration by the electoral commission.

Four constituent congresses took place on November 22, 2003, May 29, 2004, May 29, 2005, April 18, 2009. The decision to create the PFP was to approve its Charter, Program, and Manifesto and were taken by PFP founders at the congresses. The Ministry of Justice of Belarus refused to register a new political party under formal grounds in any of these 4 cases.

== History of PFP ==
The PFP came into existence in the mid-1990s, when a small group of people organized an initiative called "Civil Alliance". In 1996, the initiative was transformed into the youth wing of the liberal-conservative United Civil Party of Belarus called "Civil Forum".

In 2000, the United Civil Party decided not to participate in parliamentary elections. However, members of the Civil Forum disagreed with the Party's decision and took part in the election campaign. Civil Forum's chairman Uładzimier Navasiad was elected as an MP. It was at this time that Civil Forum broke away from the United Civil Party. Civil Forum began to elaborate on its own strategy based on liberal values.

After winning of Uładzimier Navasiad in the elections Civil Forum members developed and started lobbying at the Belarusian Parliament draft-laws on alternative military service, on citizens savings, election reform, canceling of obligatory distribution of graduates in Belarus etc. Having its own MP provided Civil Forum and its leader Uładzimier Navasiad with the possibilities of the organizing youth events in all regions of Belarus, sending official MP requests and other means of activities. Therefore, since 2001 Civil Forum started to be the leading democratic organization in Belarus.

The necessity to create a liberal party on the basis of the youth organization became more evident as members of its youth organization were getting older. That's why In 2001 senior part of Civil Forum members initiating creation of the first liberal party in Belarus - Party of Freedom and Progress. The Ministry of Justice of Belarus refused to register a new political party under formal grounds in 4 cases.

== PFP status ==
The basis of PFP is the activities of the registered youth NGO "Civil Forum" and the youth that has not previously been a member of political parties. Party emphasis is on the creation of political brands and active participation in local and parliamentary elections.

PFP has the greatest number of supporters (founders) in the Homiel, Mahiloŭ and Hrodna regions of Belarus.

The Party of Freedom and Progress will make efforts to fill a niche in a political spectrum of the country. It shall become the first democratic liberal party in Belarus (the United Civil Party of Belarus already existing in Belarus is based on conservative ideas and calls itself "liberal-conservative"). PFP intends to articulate and promote liberal ideas in Belarus. According to the article 4.1.3. the main ideological aim of Party of Freedom and Progress is promoting democratic and liberal values, advancing of liberal economic and political reforms in Belarus. European integration of Belarus and close cooperation with European financial and political institutions are two main basic international theses of the PFP political platform.

In the international politics Party of Freedom and Progress in 2013 became an affiliate member of Alliance of Liberals and Democrats for Europe (ALDE). Its youth wing, Civil Forum, is a full member of Liberal Youth of Europe (LYMEC - youth wing of ALDE) and International Federation of Liberal Youth (IFLRY).

== PFP activities and electoral campaigns ==
Members of Party of Freedom and Progress have been active participating in electoral processes in Belarus.

Electoral campaigns	Nomination signatures collected (approx.)	PFP and its youth wing elections nominees	Elected candidates	Best results
Local elections 1999	No records	1 (Civil Forum)	0	No records
Parliament elections 2000	No records	1 (Civil Forum)	1	U. Navasiad was elected as Deputy of Parliament from Kupalauski election district No.95
President elections 2001	-	-	-	-
Local elections 2003	1400	15	1	A. Tsimafeeu was elected as Deputy of Local Gorki council
Parliament elections and national referendum 2004	15000	4	0	No records
President elections 2006	14000	– PFP supported join candidate from democratic forces A. Milinkevich	-	-
Local elections 2007	8800	21	No records	No records
Parliament elections 2008	15000	7	0	U. Navasiad, 2nd place, 8898 votes (23,3%) S. Eudakimovich., 3rd place, 4802 votes (9,31%)
Local elections 2010	5000	21	No records	No records
President elections 2010	35 000	PFP supported three independent candidates - D. Us, M. Statkevich, A. Michalevic	-	-
Parliament elections 2012	5000	3	0	U. Navasiad, 2nd place, 6886 votes (19,9%)
Local elections 2014	3000	9	0	J. Stukalau, 3rd place, 490 votes (12,17%)
President elections 2015	-	-	-	-
Parliament elections 2016	5500	4	0	J. Stukalau, 3rd place, 3467 votes (7,9%) U. Navasiad, 4th place, 3624 votes (9,2%)
Local elections 2018	3000	7	0	J. Stukalau, 3rd place, 486 votes (9,8%) A. Lazarau, 3rd place, 447 votes (8%)
Parliament elections 2019	-	1	0	A. Irkho, 5th place, 504 votes (1,14%)
President elections 2020	-	-	-	-

During President elections 2020 Party of Freedom and Progress strongly support pro-democratic changes in Belarus. With its youth wing Civil Forum PFP initiated big civil campaign against the main pro-governmental newspaper Sovetskaya Belorussiya – Belarus' Segodnya accused it of political insult of Belarusians voted for alternative candidates and collects more than 11 000 signatures. The independent observation mission during Presidential elections organized by Civil Forum and covering 40 election polls was the biggest young independent observation mission in Belarus. Observers detected big amount of violations on the election polls and published official report about it. During the elections Party called on voting against all candidates. But youth wing of Party, Civil Forum called to do "alternative democratic choice'. After President elections Party has been continuing to call for stop violence against peaceful demonstrators and for democratic political changes in cooperation with other opposition parties in Belarus.
