= Viacorka =

Viacorka or Viačorka is a Belarusian surname. Notable people with the surname include:

- Franak Viačorka (born 1988), Belarusian politician and activist, son of Vincuk
- Vincuk Viačorka (born 1961), Belarusian scientist, politician, and activist
