= Dimitris Dimitriadis =

Greek innovation consultant and futurist

- Δημήτρης Δημητριάδης
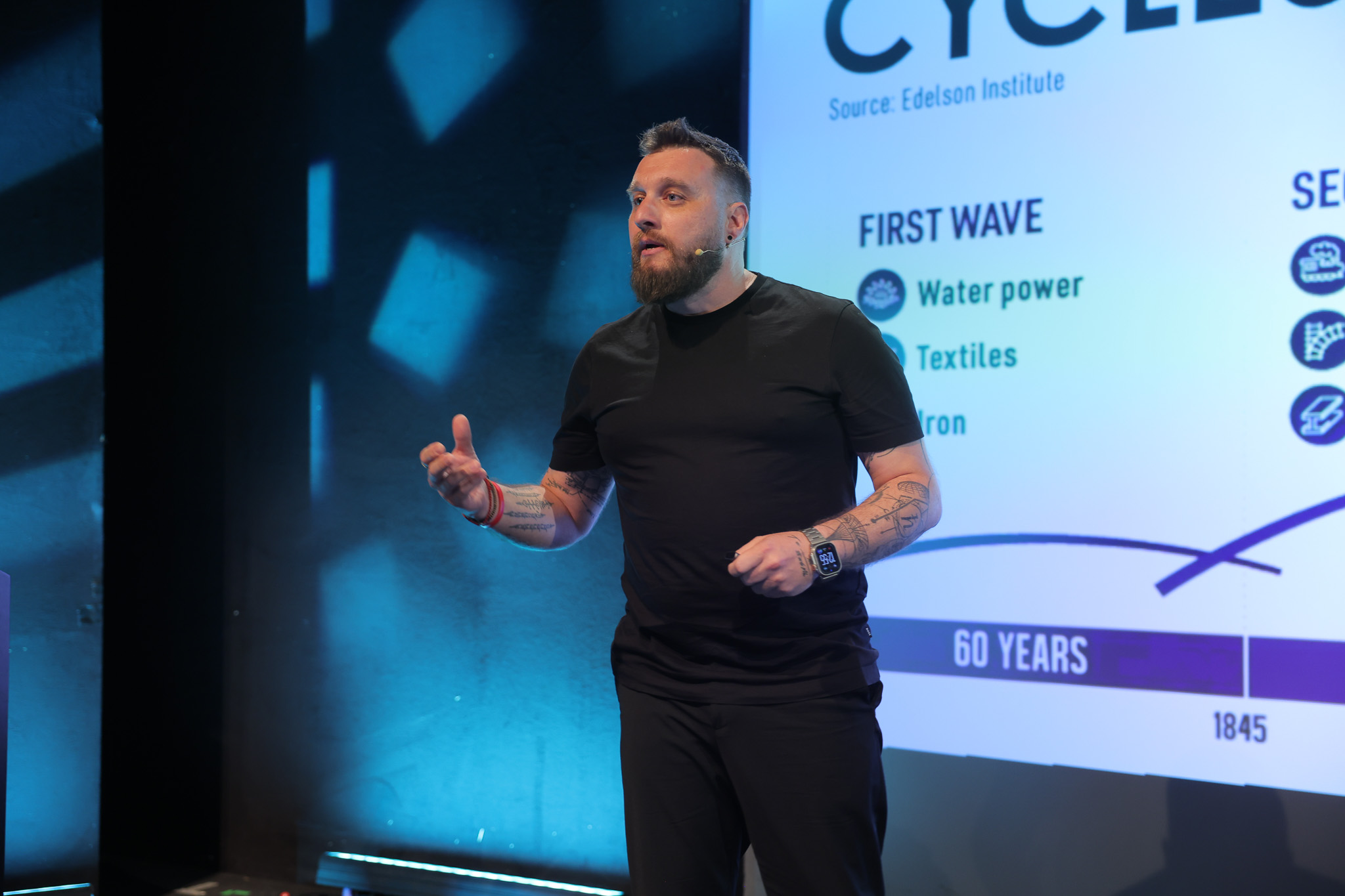
- Citizenship: Greek
- Education: University of the Arts London; Royal College of Art
- Occupations: futurist; consultant; advisor; researcher
- Website: https://dimitrisdimitriadis.com/

Dimitris Dimitriadis (Greek: Δημήτρης Δημητριάδης) is a Greek innovation consultant and researcher in the field of futures studies. He is Founder and Chief Innovation Officer (CIO) of Cogniveil.ai, a governance intelligence layer that ensures compliance, transparency and full auditability for enterprises operating under strict regulatory frameworks.

== Early life and education ==
He studied design with a focus on innovation, earning a BA from the University of the Arts London and an MA in Design Interaction from the Royal College of Art in London. He also completed a Strategic Foresight programme at the Copenhagen Institute for Futures Studies.

== Career and research ==
In 2018 he co‑founded TheFutureCats Advisory, an artificial intelligence consulting firm.

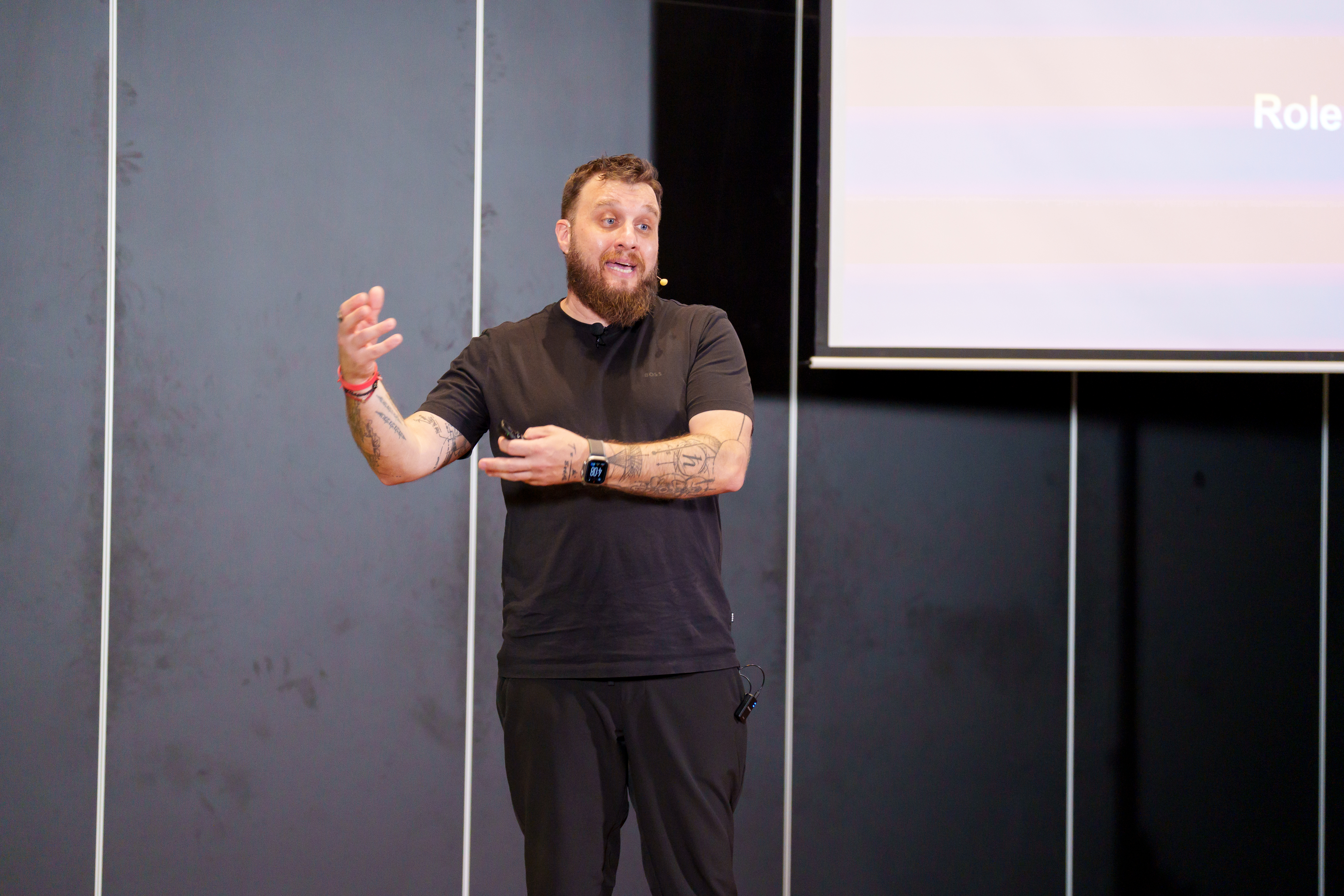
Dimitris Dimitriadis speaking at an event

He has taught data analytics & AI at CITY College, University of York Europe Campus, and has collaborated with Alba – The American College of Greece and Business College of Athens.

Dimitriadis has developed the Tri‑Scope Synthesis method, a strategic foresight framework that combines critical thinking, futures thinking and exponential thinking. His work on strategic foresight and digital futures has been discussed in international and Greek media.

He is a member of the Association of Professional Futurists.

In 2023 he published the book 2049 - A Hopeful Perspective on the Futures of Humanity with Key Books, analysing long‑term technology and society trends and accompanied by an augmented reality application..

In 2026 he published the revised edition 2049 - A Manual for a Hopeful Intelligence Age, where he explains how technology shifted from application to infrastructure and what we need to know today to be ready for tomorrow.

== Speaking and media ==
Dimitriadis has spoken at conferences and institutional events, including TEDxBerlin, TEDxAUEB, and TEDxMetropolitanCollege, as well as the Delphi Economic Forum and other business and policy events. He has also participated in DCN Global events related to digital transformation and Web3.

His work and views on technology and the future have been profiled in outlets such as El País, The National Herald, Proto Thema, Fortune Greece, HR Professional, Esquire Greece, Reader, Ethnikos Kiryx, Newsit, Kathimerini Kyprou, and others.
