= Franak Viačorka =

Belarusian politician (born 1988)

- Франак Вячорка
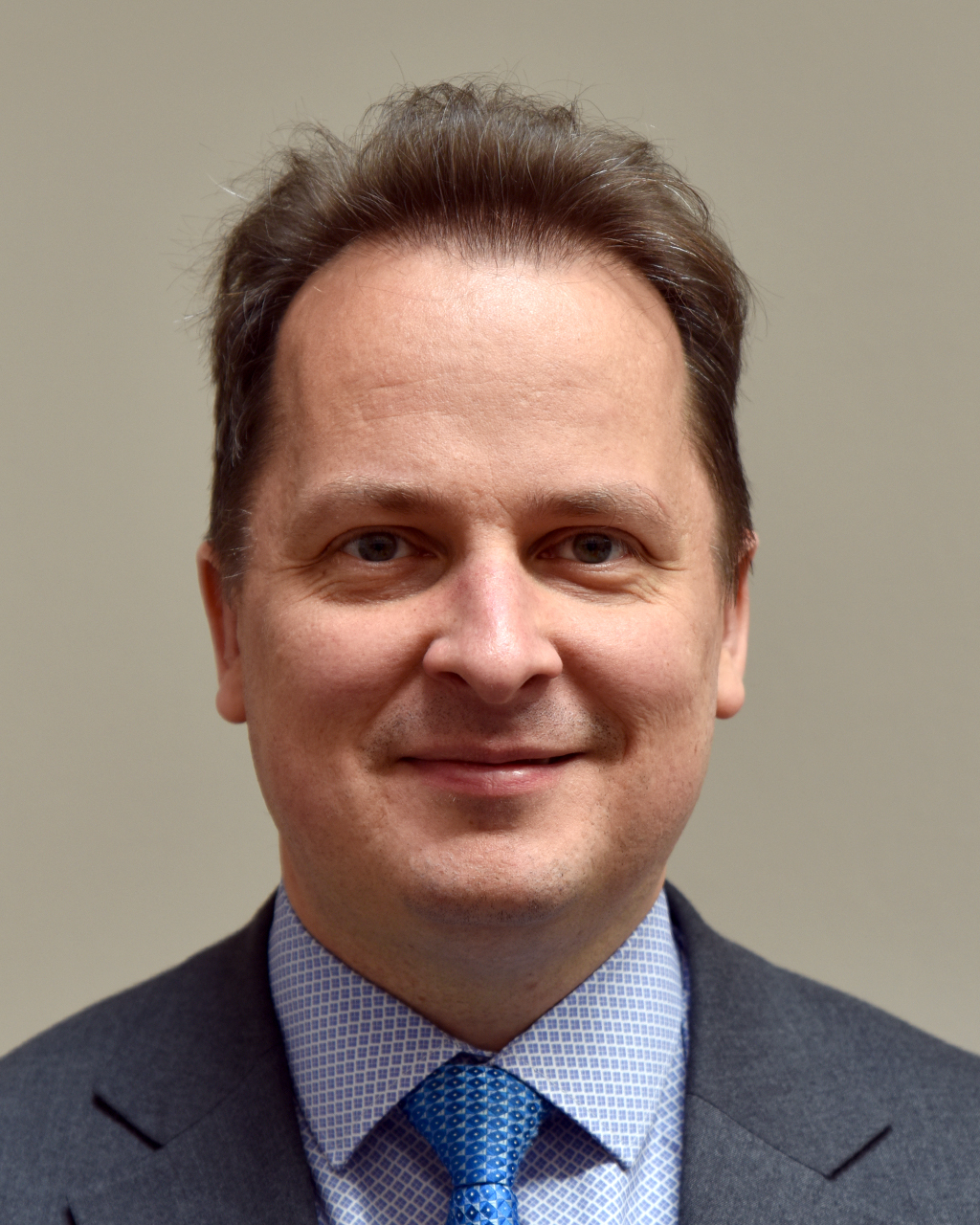
- Viačorka in 2026
- Born: 26 March 1988 (age 38); Minsk, Byelorussian SSR, Soviet Union
- Education: American University (M.A.), Warsaw University (B.A.)
- Occupation: Senior Political Advisor to Sviatlana Tsikhanouskaya
- Parents: Vincuk Viačorka (father); Aryna Viačorka (mother)

Francišak Valancinavič Viačorka (Belarusian: Франці́шак Валянці́навіч Вячо́рка, Russian: Франтишек Валентинович Вечёрко, Frantishek Valentinovich Vechyorko; born 26 March 1988) is a Belarusian politician and journalist. He is president of the Digital Communication Network and a non-resident fellow at the Atlantic Council.

Currently, Viačorka functions as senior advisor to Belarusian politician Sviatlana Tsikhanouskaya. Franak is a visiting professor at the College of Europe.

== Educational and work experience ==
Viačorka studied at the Belarusian Lyceum for Humanities, Journalism Department of Belarusian State University, and the European Humanitarian University. Viačorka has two degrees in Communications (B.A.) and International Relations (M.A.). He graduated from Warsaw University and American University.

Viačorka also worked as a research media analyst for the U.S. Agency for Global Media (USAGM) focusing on Eurasia’s digital markets. His research focused on Russian and Chinese efforts to control the global media space, spread disinformation, and build the sovereign internet infrastructure. He has served as a creative director for the Belarus service of Radio Free Europe/Radio Liberty (RFE/RL), consultant for Freedom House.

== Current status ==
Franak Viačorka is the chief political advisor to Sviatlana Tsikhanouskaya and the head of the international relations department of the Office of Sviatlana Tsikhanouskaya. He often appears in the Belarusian and foreign press.

== Public activities ==
He is the son of prominent opposition politician Vincuk Viačorka. Since his youth, Franak has been involved in the opposition movement to current Belarusian president Alexander Lukashenko. Franak was member of Young Front, a founder and formerly chairman of the BPF Youth (2008-2009), the youth wing of the Belarusian Popular Front, succeeded on October 10, 2009 by Andrej Krečka. Organizer of many demonstrations, political campaigns and flash-mobs.

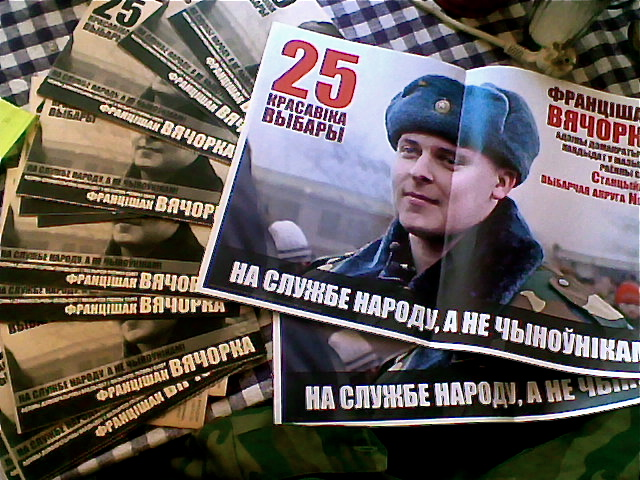
Franak Viačorka during Local Elections 2010

Member of the Board (2007-2009), National Council (2007-2009) of BPF Party. Chairman of a Commission on Culture (2007-2009) of BPF Party. Member of Belarusian Language Society.

Took part in Electoral campaigns in headquarters (2000, 2001, 2004, 2008). In 2010 - as a candidate in local elections to Mazyr City Council, but elections were falsified. Administrator of a Unified oppositional candidate Alaksandar Milinkievič website (2005-2006), United Democratic Forces of Belarus (2007-2009).

One of the founders and managers of Art-Siadziba - public open space for independent events in Minsk.

Director and producer of musical project "Partyzanaskaja Škoła" (Partisan School), musical compact discs "Ja lublu licej" (I Love Lyceum), "Vieru u Ciabie" (Trust you), "Partyzanaskaja Škoła" (Partisan School), "Pieśni Lisoŭčykaŭ" (Songs of Lisouchyks), "Janka Kupala - 125", "be-x-old:НезалежныЯ". Producer of "Audiobooks in Belarusian" project.

Producer and Manager of "Cinema Dubbing into Belarusian" project. There dubbed Pulp Fiction, Shrek 2, En Liten Julsaga, Love Actually, V for Vendetta.

== Repressions ==
On February 18, 2008, Viačorka was expelled from his third year of journalism at the Belarusian State University, in spite of his excellent academic performance, for missing two exams. The fact that he was being detained by the police was not accepted as a legitimate excuse by the university authorities. A subsequent attempt to enroll in the exiled European Humanities University, a private Belarusian university operating in neighbouring Lithuania due to Lukashenko's restrictions, failed as Viačorka's name was on a list of persons banned from travelling outside Belarus.

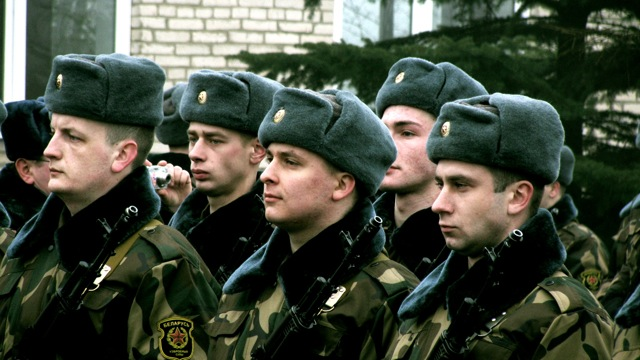
Franak Viačorka was drafted into the army in spite of his state of health"

It has been reported that on 16 January 2009, Viačorka was forcibly conscripted into the Armed Forces of Belarus by the authorities, despite having been found medically unfit. Several other youth activists, such as Ivan Šyła, were also drafted. As of February 2009, he was stationed in the air defence unit 48694 in Mazyr, Gomel Region. In the course of his training, it is alleged that he has been subjected to harassment by senior military figures in order to make him speak Russian rather than Belarusian, although both are legal for use in the military. As a soldier, Viačorka fought for soldiers’ rights and the rights of local residents. On April 14, 2010 Viačorka was released from the army because of health problems. During his military service Viačorka participated as a candidate in local elections to Mazyr City Council.

During military service Viačorka was writing "Blog of Belarusian Soldier", which became very popular in Internet.

Viačorka has been arrested and imprisoned several times for his activities, last time in January 2011.

After being dismissed from the military, Viačorka was refused admission to Belarusian State University to which he applied eight times. He was also refused admission to all other public universities in Belarus, violating the law which provides guaranteed admission to dismissed soldiers. Viačorka is currently pursuing a degree in media and public relations at the University of Warsaw.

In January 2022, it became known that Viačorka, along with bloggers Roman Protasevich, Anton Motolko, and Stsiapan Putsila are suspected by Belarusian authorities on 10 counts. They were accused of organizing a conspiracy to seize power, inciting hatred, organizing mass riots, forming extremist formations, high treason, as well as a number of other serious crimes. On June 20, 2024, the Belarusian authorities sentenced Viačorka in absentia to 20 years in prison.

== Cinema ==
In 2006 he starred in the award-winning documentary titled "A Lesson of Belarusian" that chronicled Viačorka's life as a pro-democracy youth activist in the run-up to the 2006 presidential elections in Belarus. Viačorka's work with his fellow activists was followed for two weeks. His father Vincuk Viačorka was also featured, as was Uładzimier Kołas, principal of the Belarusian Humanities Lyceum and a prominent academic.

Viačorka is the co-screenwriter and second director of a fiction movie being produced by the Documentary and Feature Film Production Company of Poland about his time in the Belarusian Army and the situation for other young conscripts. The film, "Viva Belarus!", directed by Krzysztof Łukaszewicz, was released in spring 2013.

Viačorka also played in Tutejszyja movie. This movie was forbidden in Belarus.

== Awards and prizes ==
- Institute for the Study of Totalitarian Regimes Award
- Belarusian Democratic Republic 100th Jubilee Medal
- Civil Society Leadership Award, 2016: by Open Society Foundations (OSF)
- «Person of the Year», 2014: Nasha Niva: «For the efforts to promote Belarus national identity»
- «30 under 30», 2013: National Endowment for Democracy. Featured among «promising young leaders, all age 30 or younger, who are working for a democratic future in 24 countries».
- The Best Screenplay, 2013: €2000, Brussels Film Festival, for the movie «Viva Belarus!»
- Václav Havel Fellowship, 2012: by Ministry of Foreign Affairs of the Czech Republic and Radio Free Europe / Radio Liberty, Prague, Czech Republic. Personally referenced by Václav Havel.
- Literary Prize «Golden apostrophe», «Debut in Prose», 2010. Minsk, Belarus.
- The National Human Rights Award “For Personal Courage”, 2009. Minsk, Belarus
- «New Generation» Prize, 2008— «For Courage and Bravery in the Struggle for Freedom and Democracy in Belarus”, Chișinău, Moldova,
- IDFA Bertha Fund Award, 2007, Amsterdam, Netherlands
- «Best actor» at Lviv Film Festival (Ukraine) (2007)
