= Vladimir Novosiad =

Belarusian politician

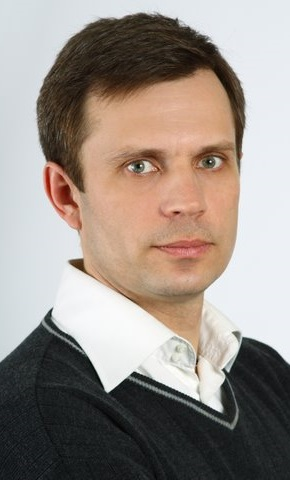

Personal details
- Born: 12 April 1968 (age 58) Kyiv, Ukrainian SSR, Soviet Union
- Party: Belarusian Liberal Party of Freedom and Progress (PFP)
- Occupation: Lawyer

Vladimir Novosiad is a Belarusian politician of liberal orientation, the leader of Belarusian Liberal Party of Freedom and Progress. He was born on April 12, 1968, in Kyiv, Ukrainian SSR, Soviet Union. Variants of his name include the following: Vladimir Novosyad, Uladzimir Navasiad, Uladzimir Navasyad, (Belarusian: Навасяд Уладзiмiр Уладзiмiравіч, Russian: Новося́д Владимир Владимирович). Married and has two daughters.

== Political activity ==
At the end of the 80s, while being a student of the Mogilev State Pedagogical University, Vladimir Novosiad created a non-governmental organization “Students' Union“ that became an alternative to Komsomol organization of the university. The organization strived for development of student's self-administration. He was also an initiator of creation of the Republican Students' Union - an organization, the goal of which was to take an organized action against the monopoly of Comsomol organization and the Communist Party of the Soviet Union in educational institutions of the country.

In 1990 Vladimir Novosiad won Mogilev City Council of Deputies elections and became City Council member for the period from 1990 to 1996. He initiated establishment of Youth Department in the Mogilev City Administration (first one in Belarus). From 1993 to 1995 he was in charge of this department. After the establishment of the "vertical administration" initiated by A.Lukashenko in 1995, he left the office by his own will.

In 1995 Vladimir Novosiad won the elections to the Belarusian parliament (the Supreme Soviet of the Republic of Belarus) and assumed the post of the Deputy Chairman of the State Construction and Self-Government Commission. In 1995 he became a co-founder of the parliamentary fraction called “Civil Action“ that was headed by Stanislav Bogdankevich. After the constitutional crisis and referendum in 1996 Vladimir Novosiad was “dismissed” from the Supreme Soviet in connection with “personnel reduction”.

In 1995 he created the Belarusian youth non-governmental organization and was elected its chairman. In 1997 he initiated creation of the first youth coalition named “Young Belarus”. In 1999 the youth organization “Civil Forum” headed by Novosiad founded the newspaper “Youth Prospectus” (Russian: «Молодежный проспект»). The newspaper was closed by the authorities in 2006.

In 1999 Vladimir Novosiad refused to participate in boycott announced by the opposition in relation to the parliamentary elections 2000. He was registered as a candidate and won the elections in one of the Minsk city constituencies. So he became a member of the House of Representatives of the National Assembly of the Republic of Belarus. Being the MP he submitted for consideration of the Parliament a number of draft laws (“On Alternative Military Service“, “On Savings of Citizens“), a set of amendments to the law “On Status of the House of Representatives“, etc. During this time he also actively worked in close cooperation with the inhabitants of his constituency.

Vladimir Novosiad was not allowed to participate in parliamentary elections 2004 and local elections 2007 by the officials of electoral commissions. In the first case Vladimir Novosiad's victory was hindered by removing him from the electoral list five days prior to the ballot day, in the second he was not even registered as a candidate.

From 2000 until 2004 he was using the authorities of the deputy of Parliament and was working as a member of the constant commission on the state-building and self-government. At the first session of Parliament he has achieved equality in the rights of journalists of independent and state mass-media while broadcasting of work of legislative authorities. With the support of youth from "[Civil Forum]" he works out a number of bills for Parliament's consideration: “On alternative military service”,"On savings of citizens”, the set of amendments to the law “On the status of the House of Representatives” and others. He was actively working with inhabitants of the district from which he had been elected as an MP. Under the applications of voters he took part in solving problems of regional and city scale personally and through his assistants. Novosiad was one of those who voted against amendments to the legislation toughened the order of organising of mass actions. In March, 2003 in cooperation with the parliamentary group "The Republic" he initiated a petition of changes in the electoral legislation of Belarus.

During local elections 2003 he disclosed electoral frauds which have not allowed his assistant A.Melnikov to become a member of the Minsk City Council of Deputies.

Vladimir Novosiad has been prevented from participation in parliamentary elections of 2004 and local elections of 2007 by the officials of the electoral committee: in the first case Vladimir Novosiad's victory in district have been excluded by his candidacy annulment five days prior the day of voting, in the second case - at the stage of registration of the candidate. At the parliamentary elections in 2008 he was refused of registration as a candidate, but has appealed successfully to the Central electoral commission which registered him for participation in the election.

In 2008 he took part in the parliamentary elections. Stands in Svislochsky constituency of Minsk (“Serebryanka” and “Loshytsa” districts). Vladimir Novosiad opposed self-recalling of opposition candidates before the voting day. During electioneering campaign he had a conflict with pro-governmental candidate Gennady Davydko. The conflict has reached the threats from the side of Davydko to imprison Novosiad. Under the official results of elections he did not become an MP.

The idea to establish the first Belarusian liberal party appeared among Novosiad's supporters in 2001–2003. The Organizing Committee led by Vladimir Novosiad was formed simultaneously. The party has not been registered yet, as the Ministry of Justice refused to register it three times in a row under formal grounds. The fourth Constituent congress is planned for the second half of 2007 or the beginning of 2008.
