= Elections in Belarus =

Belarus elects on national level a head of state—the president—and a legislature. The president is elected for a five-year term by the people. The National Assembly (Нацыянальны сход, Nacyjanaĺny schod) has two chambers. The House of Representatives (Палата прадстаўнікоў, Palata Pradstaŭnikoŭ) has 110 members elected in single-seat constituencies elected for a four-year term. The Council of the Republic (Савет рэспублікі, Saviet Respubliki) has 64 members, 56 members indirectly elected and eight members appointed by the president.

Belarus is a state in which the president, currently Alexander Lukashenko, dominates. Opposition parties are allowed, but are widely considered to have no real chance of gaining power. A report by the Electoral Integrity Project, reviewing worldwide elections for 2015 and released in February 2016, evaluated Belarus as a state "failing to meet international standards of electoral integrity."

== Electoral history ==
=== 1994 presidential elections ===
In 1994, the first ever elections for the office of President of Belarus took place. Before the adoption of the state constitution, Belarus has had a prime minister since the dissolution of the Soviet Union. At the time, Vyacheslav Kebich was the prime minister. At the end of the first balloting in June 1994, Kebich was slated to face the other candidate, Alexander Lukashenko.

Presidential elections – first round:

Candidate	%
Alexander Lukashenko	44.8 %
Vyacheslav Kebich	17.3 %
Zyanon Paznyak	12.9 %
Stanislau Shushkevich	9.9 %
Alaksandar Dubko	6.0 %
Vasil Novikaŭ	4.6 %

Presidential elections – second round:

Candidate	%
Alexander Lukashenko	80.1 %
Vyacheslav Kebich	19.9 %

=== 1995 parliamentary elections ===
On 11 April 1995, Parliament rejected three of the four issues to be put to a national referendum on the same day as general elections, and President of the Republic Alexander Lukashenko – in office since July 1994 and a firm advocate of the issues – threatened its dissolution. The proposed referendums concerned closer ties with the Russian Federation and the President's power to dissolve the legislature.

Due especially to the multitude of candidates and the high thresholds required for election, only 18 Deputies were outright victors in the first round of voting and only 101 more (of 432 remaining candidates) in the second on 28 May. The resulting total of 119 fell short of the two-thirds (174) legal quorum which would have allowed the new legislature to sit. Polling for the remaining 141 seats accordingly took place on 29 November, when 865 candidates were in the running. Only 20 Deputies were then returned. On 10 December, runoffs between the two leading candidates were held in the other 121 constituencies; 59 more seats were then filled so that, with an overall total of 198 Deputies definitely chosen, the quorum was finally reached. Due to shortages in the applicable electoral majorities, 62 seats still remained vacant.

=== 1995 referendum ===
The 14 May 1995 Belarus Referendum required the population of Belarus to vote on four issues:

1. The state status of the Russian language
2. Economic integration with Russia
3. The introduction of new national symbols
4. The President's right to dismiss the Parliament, if the latter violates the Constitution.

The date of the referendum coincided with the date of the elections to the Parliament. On 11 April 1995, the Parliament considered the questions for the referendum, approved the date, but approved only the question regarding economic integration with Russia. Alexander Lukashenko declared that he would not change his decision and left the Parliament. 19 members of the Parliament from the Belarusian Popular Front decided to carry out a hunger strike within the Parliament building, protesting against the president organizing the referendum despite the parliament's decision. They were beaten and forcibly removed by OMON. The parliamentarians sued the special forces for battery but weren't successful. A conciliatory commission was called upon to resolve the conflict of President vs. Parliament about the referendum, which was eventually decided in the President's favor.

The voter turnout was 4,823,482 citizens or 64.8% of the total electorate (7,445,820). All four proposals were announced as passed. Of three questions, the one relating to national symbols turned out to be the most controversial.

According to many opposition experts, the 1995 referendum was illegal and thus its results have no legal power:

OSCE Parliamentary Assembly stated that the referendum in Belarus has violated international standards of elections. The organization noted governmental control over the media, the government's interference into the voting process, obstacles to the opposition's activities etc. US Department of State also criticized the Belarusian government for this referendum. The Russian State Duma issued a statement supporting the official results of the referendum that promoted the status of Russian language in Belarus.

=== 1996 referendum ===
The 24 November 1996 Belarusian Referendum required the population of Belarus to vote on four issues suggested by President Lukashenko and three suggested by the Supreme Council of Belarus. 6,181,463 citizens took part in the referendum, or 84.14% of the total electorate of 7,346,397.

President's questions

1. To move the Independence Day of the Republic of Belarus (Republic Day) to 3 July, the day of the liberation of Belarus from Nazi occupants during the Second World War.
  88.18% voted for, 10.46% voted against.
2. To adopt the 1994 Constitution of the Republic of Belarus with amendments and additions (new revision of the Constitution of the Republic of Belarus) suggested by President of the Republic of Belarus A.G. Lukashenko.
  70.45% voted for, 9.39 voted against.
3. Do you favor the free, without any limitations, selling and buying of land?
  15.35% voted for, 82.88% voted against
4. Do you approve the abolition of the death sentence in the Republic of Belarus?
  17.93% voted for, 82.88% voted against.

Supreme Council's questions

1. To adopt the 1994 Constitution of the Republic of Belarus with amendments and additions suggested by the Communist and Agrarian fractions of the Supreme Soviet.
  7.93% voted for, 71.2% voted against
2. Do you favor the suggestion that the leaders of the local organs of the executive power to be elected directly by the residents of the corresponding administrative-territorial unit?
  28.14% voted for, 69.92% voted against
3. Do you agree that financing of all branches of state power has to be carried out in an open and transparent way and only from the state budget?
  32.18% voted for, 65.85% voted against.

The Belarusian democratic opposition, human rights organizations and several foreign observers have recorded numerous violations of the legislation regarding the organization of the referendum, both during the voting itself and during the campaign before it. The referendum was accompanied by a constitutional crisis, a conflict between president Alexander Lukashenko and the oppositional parliament. There have been mass street protests by the opposition protesting against the referendum and against human rights violations.

The opposition also spoke of the rigging of the referendum, and never recognized the results, as well as the results of the previous referendum held in 1995. Alena Skryhan, the deputy head of Communist fraction of the Parliament in 1996 said that the referendum had led to monopolization of all branches of power by president Alexander Lukashenko.

=== 2000 parliamentary elections ===
In October 2000, parliamentary elections occurred for the first time since the referendum of 1996. According to Organization for Security and Co-operation in Europe (OSCE)/ODIHR, these elections failed to meet international standards for democratic elections. Lukashenko announced early in 2001 that presidential elections would be held. Western monitors made charges of nondemocratic practices throughout the election period, including charges vote counting fraud. These charges of irregularities led the OSCE/ODIHR to find that these elections also failed to meet Belarus' OSCE commitments for democratic elections. Although it was considered to be "puppet" parliament of Lukashenko, eventually there appeared dissenting voices, notably the parliamentary group "Respublika" (Valery Frałoŭ, Uładzimier Parfianovič, Siarhiej Skrabiec, Uładzimier Navasiad).

=== 2001 presidential elections ===
The 2001 Belarusian presidential elections were held on 9 September 2001 with three candidates competing. The incumbent president, Alexander Lukashenko, was one of the candidates running for office. The two candidates that sought to unseat Lukashenko were Vladimir Goncharik and Sergei Gaidukevich. According to the official data, Alexander Lukashenko has won in the first balloting with 75,65% of votes against 15,65% for Goncharik. Turnout — 83,86%.

=== 2004 parliamentary elections ===
In Belarus, while there are political parties that either support or oppose President Lukashenko, the majority of the seats in the National Assembly are filled by those not affiliated with any political parties ("non-partisans"). However, there are three political parties who hold seats in the House of Representatives: the Communist Party of Belarus (8 seats), the Agrarian Party of Belarus (3 seats), and the Liberal Democratic Party of Belarus (1 seat). The other two parties that pledged their support to Lukashenko, the Belarusian Socialist Sporting Party and the Republican Party of Labour and Justice, did not secure any seats in the October 2004 election. Opposition parties, such as the Belarusian People's Front and the United Civil Party of Belarus did not gain any seats. The UCPB and the BPF are some of the parties that comprise the People's Coalition 5 Plus, a group of political parties who oppose Lukashenko. Several organizations, including as the OSCE, declared the election un-free due to opposition parties negative results and the bias of the Belarusian media in favor of the government. However, in constitutional as well as political terms, the House is of marginal importance. At the 2000 election, it took four rounds of voting before all the seats were filled; in the end, 86% of the elected deputies were independents, and the remainder were the representatives of parties traditionally loyal to the president (OSCE, 2000).

The 13–17 October 2004 elections, according to the OSCE/ODIHR Election Observation Mission, fell significantly short of OSCE commitments. Universal principles and constitutionally guaranteed rights of expression, association and assembly were seriously challenged, calling into question the Belarusian authorities’ willingness to respect the concept of political competition on a basis of equal treatment. According to this mission principles of an inclusive democratic process, whereby citizens have the right to seek political office without discrimination, candidates to present their views without obstruction, and voters to learn about them and discuss them freely, were largely ignored. A Council of Europe report describes the danger that politicians risk of being assassinated, summarising an investigation into allegations that the present head of the Belarusian Special Rapid Reaction Unit (SOBR), Dmitri Pavlichenko, assassinated two senior politicians, a businessman and a journalist in 1999.

=== 2004 referendum ===
The 17 October 2004 Belarus Referendum was declared by President of Belarus Alexander Lukashenko in his decree #431 on 7 September 2004. The referendum was about the following question:

- Do you permit the first President of the Republic of Belarus A.G. Lukashenko to participate as a candidate for Presidency of the Republic of Belarus during the President elections and do you adopt the Part I of Article 81 of the Constitution of the Republic of Belarus in the following wording:
  - "President is elected for the term of 5 years directly by the people of the Republic of Belarus by means of the universal, free, equal and direct suffrage under the voting by secret ballot"?

6,307,395 citizens took part in the referendum, or 90.28% of the total electorate of 6,986,163. 79.42% voted for, 9.90% voted against, the rest of the ballots were declared invalid.

The referendum is considered to having been held in violation of Belarusian Electoral Code, as its Paragraph 112 lists "questions connected with election and dismissal of the President of the Republic of Belarus" among questions prohibited from being brought out to the Republican referendum.

=== 2006 presidential election ===
The next round of elections took place on 19 March 2006, and this election also included selecting the President. Lukashenko was opposed in the election by Alaksandar Milinkievič, a candidate representing a coalition of oppositional parties. Another opposition candidate, Alaksandar Kazulin of the Social Democrats was detained and beaten by police during protests surrounding the Lukashenko sponsored event, the All Belarusian People's Assembly. This event, among others, have caused for concern that the 2006 elections had irregularities. The President won a landslide victory, over 80% of the vote. It was however deemed unfair by the OSCE.

=== 2008 parliamentary election ===
Summary of the 28 September 2008 Belarusian House of Representatives election results
Parties	Seats
Communist Party of Belarus (Kamunistyčnaja partyja Biełarusi)	6
Agrarian Party of Belarus (Ahrarnaja partyja Bełarusi)	1
Non-partisans (worker's collectives, public associations and civil society organizations)	103
Total	110
Source: rec.gov.by

The 2008 Belarusian parliamentary election was held in Belarus on 28 September 2008. The 110 seats in the House of Representatives were at stake.

According to the OSCE, the elections were undemocratic and the work of international observers was seriously hindered as the observers were refused access to the facilities where the votes were counted. But according to a CIS election observation mission, the elections in Belarus conformed to international standards.

According to the official results the oppositional parties failed to gain any of the 110 available seats, all of which were given to parties and non-partisan candidates loyal to president Alexander Lukashenko. The Central Election Commission who declared this, its cause of the overwhelming popular fear of mass demonstrations and of the "radical political changes" demanded by the opposition. This declaration was met with immediate anti-governmental demonstrations in the centre of Minsk protesting against electoral fraud. President Lukashenko commented that the opposition in Belarus is financed by foreign countries and is not needed.

=== 2010 presidential election ===
A presidential election was held in Belarus on 19 December 2010. The election was originally planned for the beginning of 2011. However, the final date was set during an extraordinary session of the Belarusian National Assembly on 14 September 2010.

Of the ten candidates, incumbent President Alexander Lukashenko was declared the winner by the Central Electoral Commission with 79.67% of the votes, though opposition supporters decried the election. The Central Electoral Commission issued results for the election:

Place	Candidate	Votes	
Place	Candidate	Number	%
1	Alexander Lukashenko	5,130,557	79.65
2	Andrei Sannikov	156,419	2.43
3	Jaroslav Romanchuk	127,281	1.98
4	Ryhor Kastusioŭ	126,999	1.97
5	Uladzimir Niaklajeu	114,581	1.78
6	Vital Rymasheuski	70,515	1.09
7	Viktar Ciaraščanka	76,764	1.19
8	Mikola Statkevich	67,583	1.05
9	Ales Mikhalevich	65,748	1.02
10	Dmitry Uss	25,117	0.39
Against all		416,925	6.47
Invalid votes		62,542	0.97
Voter turnout		6,441,031	90.65

The Organization for Security and Co-operation in Europe (OSCE) called the election "flawed", saying it fell well short of democratic standards. The Commonwealth of Independent States (CIS) recognised the election as legitimate.

=== 2025 presidential election ===
Held on January 26th 2025 with incumbent President Aleksandr Lukashenko winning the election. Though many experts claim the election to be rigged.

=== 2030 presidential election ===
In August 2025, Lukashenko reportedly indicated in an interview that he does not intend to seek another term. However he has not ruled out seeking another position of power.
