= Artsem Tsuran =

Belarusian politician (born 1978)

- Арцем Цуран
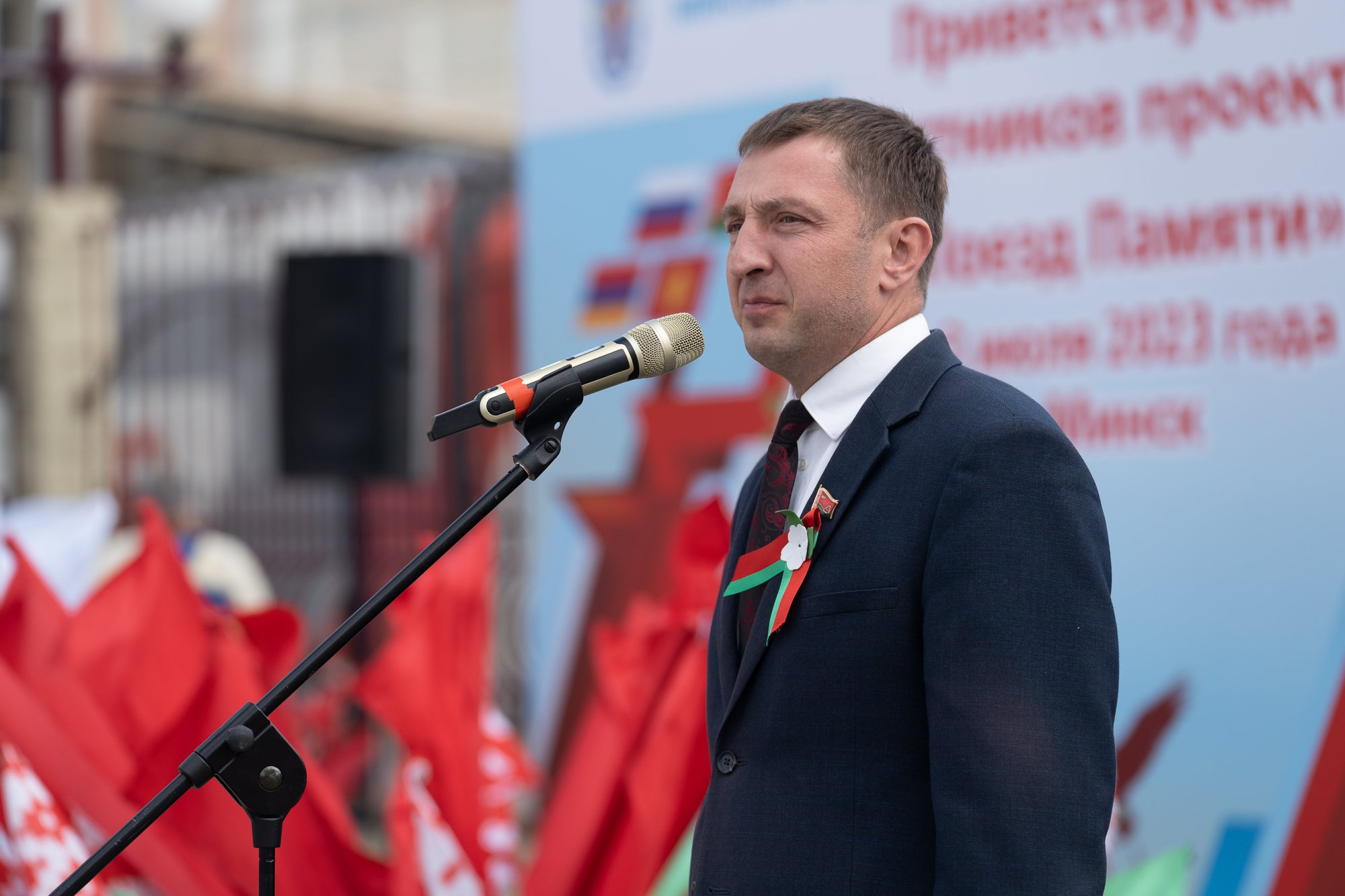

Chairman of the Minsk City Council of Deputies
- Incumbent
- Assumed office 5 March 2024
- Preceded by: Andrei Burgov

Personal details
- Born: 3 November 1978 (age 47) Hlybokaye, Byelorussian SSR
- Party: Independent
- Education: Belarusian State Pedagogical University; Academy of Public Administration

Artsem Mikalaevich Tsuran (Belarusian: Арцем Мікалаевіч Цуран; November 3, 1978) is a Belarusian politician who is serving as the chairman of the Minsk City Council of Deputies.

== Biography ==
Born on November 3, 1978, in Hlybokaye, in Byelorussian SSR. Later, he moved to Minsk with his family.

In 1999, he graduated from the Belarusian State Pedagogical University named after Maxim Tank, in 2011 - from the Academy of Public Administration under the President of the Republic of Belarus, specializing in "Human Resources Management" and in 2019 from the same institute, specializing in "Public Administration and Law".

He began his career after graduating from the university, in August 1999, as a physical education and health teacher at Secondary School No. 1 in the Babruysk district. He worked at this school until December 1999, after which, in March 2000, he got a job at Secondary School No. 4 in Minsk. He worked at this school for only a month. After which he went to the Minsk City Executive Committee to the position of chief specialist, head of the department for work with primary organizations, head of the department of patriotic education, sports and youth leisure of the Belarusian Republican Youth Union. He worked there until 2001, after which he worked as an instructor for organizational mass work, instructor-methodologist for physical education and health work of the department of organizational mass work of the open joint-stock company "Minsk Heating Equipment Plant". He worked at the plant until 2008, after which he got a job in the Frunzyenski District as the head of the department of organizational and personnel work. He worked in the department of organizational and personnel work until 2011, after which, in April 2011, he was transferred back to the Minsk City Executive Committee to the position of head of the department of personnel work of the department of organizational and personnel work. He worked in this department until October 2011, after which he was transferred to the department of organizational and personnel work to the position of director. On October 25, 2016, he was appointed head of the Frunzyenski District Administration of Minsk. In an interview with one of the Belarusian publications, he said that he lives in an ordinary multi-story building near the Sportivnaya metro station. He worked in this position until 2019, after which he was promoted.

On January 15, 2019, he was appointed deputy chairman of the Minsk City Executive Committee.

On March 5, 2024, he was appointed chairman of the Minsk City Council of Deputies.
