= Vasily Panasyuk =

Belarusian politician (born 1966)

Member of the House of Representatives
- Incumbent
- Assumed office 6 December 2019
- Constituency: Pushkinsky (2019–2024); Kalvariysky (2024–present)

Chairman of the Minsk City Council of Deputies
- In office 6 February 2013 – 3 March 2020
- Preceded by: Mikhail Savanovich
- Succeeded by: Andrei Bugrov

Personal details
- Born: 13 February 1966 (age 60)
- Party: Belaya Rus (since 2024)

Vasily Vasilievich Panasyuk (Russian: Василий Васильевич Панасюк; born 13 February 1966) is a Belarusian politician serving as a member of the House of Representatives since 2019. From 2013 to 2020, he served as chairman of the Minsk City Council.

== Biography ==
Vasily Panasyuk was born on 13 February 1966 in Mukhavets, then part of the Byelorussian SSR. In 1988, he graduated from the Faculty of Power Engineering at Belarusian National Technical University with a degree in electrical engineering. Afterwards, he obtained another degree in 1994 from Belarus State Economic University in economic management.

He started working in 1988 as an electrician for the repair of electrical machines at CHPP-4 in Minsk, then worked as an engineer and foreman at the site. Eventually, he became Deputy Head of the Production and Technical Department of CHPP-4 and was elected chairman of the trade union representing CHPP-4. In 2003 he was elected a deputy of the Minsk City Council of the 24th convocation and also became Director of the CHPP-4 branch of RUE Minskenergo. On 6 February 2013, he was elected chairman of the Minsk City Council for the 26th convocation while representing constituency no. 36. Upon being elected, he said his goals as chairman were to make a turning point in the economy with modernization and improving and well-being of Minsk while taking feedback. During his time as a representative of Minsk he allocated funding to a polyclinic, a kindergarten, Tivoli Park, and expanding Matsuevich Street.

As of 2019, he lives in Minsk.
