= A Lesson of Belarusian =

- Promotional poster
- Directed by: Mirosław Dembiński
- Written by: Mirosław Dembiński
- Produced by: Mirosław Dembiński
- Cinematography: Michał Ślusarczyk; Maciej Szafnicki
- Edited by: Mirosław Dembiński
- Release date: November 2, 2006
- Running time: 53 minutes
- Countries: Belarus; Poland
- Languages: Polish; Belarusian

A Lesson of Belarusian (Polish: Lekcja białoruskiego) is a 2006 documentary by Polish director Mirosław Dembiński. It follows the activities of several Belarusian pro-democracy youth activists in the four weeks running up to the highly controversial presidential re-election of Alexander Lukashenko on March 19, 2006. The film has won multiple festival prizes.

In 2008, a CD-disk with a film and some other disks became the first informational products that a court in Belarus recognized as extremist.

== Synopsis ==
In the documentary, 18-year-old Franak Viačorka, a youth activist with the Belarusian Popular Front, and his friends prepare for the run-up to the 2006 presidential election. Their activities range from handing out newspapers, organising rock concerts, distributing flyers, composing protest songs and interviewing Alaksandar Milinkievič, opposition candidate. Aside from the main theme of the elections, it also touches briefly on the incarceration of Franak's father, Vincuk Viačorka, a professor at the banned Belarusian Humanities Lyceum, where Franak and many of his friends were students.

Events come to a climax on the night of the election results, March 19. Following the suspicious landslide victory of Lukashenko, opposition activists and supporters take to the streets in protest, many of them setting up a 'tent city' in October Square in Minsk. By the night of March 23, riot police are deployed to clear the remaining protesters.

Two days later on March 25, Belarusian Independence Day riot police clash violently with anti-Lukashenko demonstrators, detaining several, among them Alaksandar Milinkievič. By the end of the film, Franak's father has been released from detention, the battle has temporarily been lost, but the people's spirit is unquenched. According to Franak, the end is nigh for Lukashenko.
