= Art-Siadziba =

Art Siadziba (bel. "Арт Сядзіба", eng. Art Headquarters) is an independent public cultural initiative in Belarus. It is a network of public open spaces (libraries, galleries) for independent events.

It was created with a similar spirit to the network of Las bibliotecas independientes en Cuba

Art-Siadziba (Minsk) is located in Minsk, in the factory building of "Horizont".

It is a legal registered organisation. Between December 2011 and April 2012 more than 60 different events were organized: political, public meetings, academic seminars and training sessions, informal conferences, press briefings, and concerts.

== Founders ==
Among founders:

- Stas Babaytsau
- journalist, public activist Franak Viachorka
- leader of AMAROKA Zmicier Afanasenka
