= Vincuk Viačorka =

Belarusian linguist, politician, and pro-democracy activist

- Вінцук Вячорка
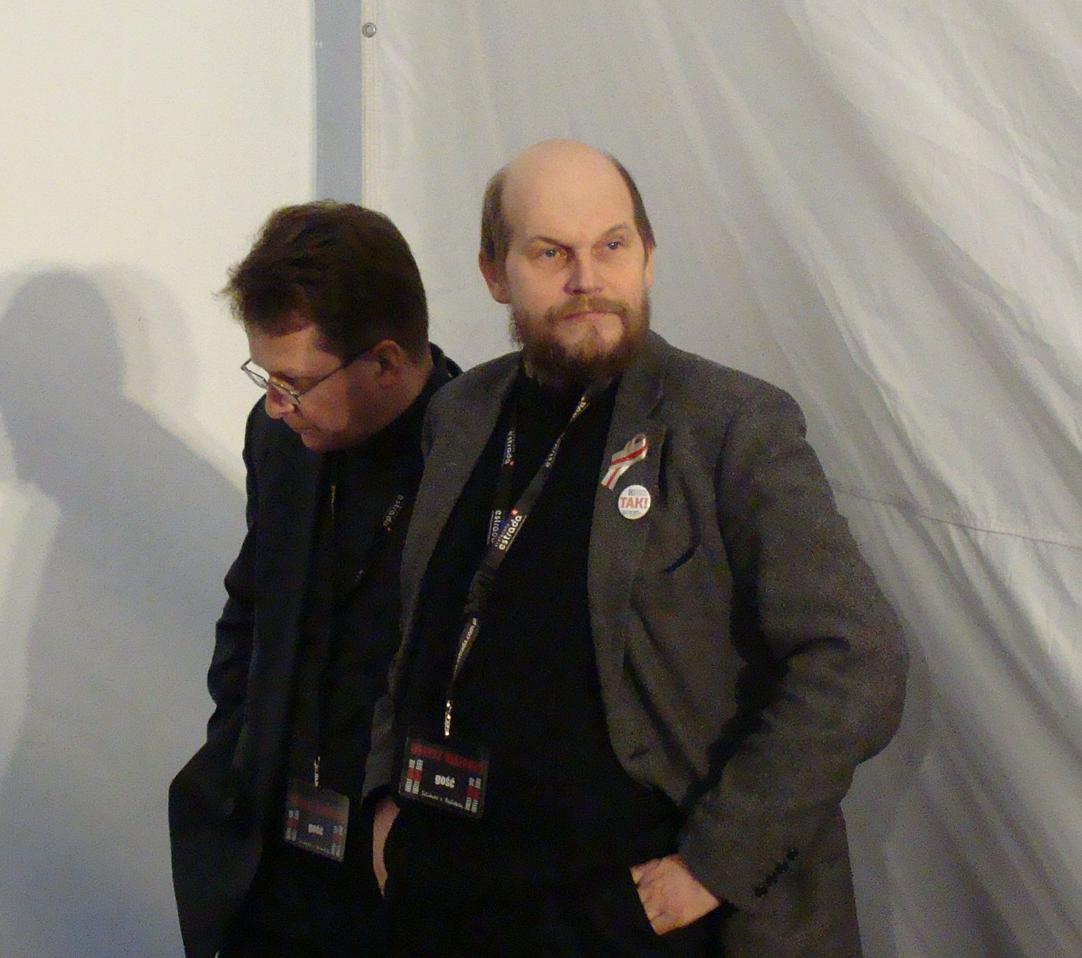
- Viačorka (left) with Lavon Barshcheuski (right) in 2009
- Born: 7 July 1961 (age 65); Brest, Byelorussian SSR, Soviet Union (now Belarus)
- Political party: Belarusian Popular Front
- Movement: Belarusian opposition
- Spouse: Aryna Viačorka
- Children: Franak Viačorka

Valancin (Note: Vincuk (Belarusian: Вінцук; Russian: Винцук, romanized: Vintsuk) is a diminutive form of Valancin.) Ryhoravič Viačorka (Belarusian: Валянцін Рыгоравіч Вячорка, [vʲinˈtsuk vʲaˈtʂorka], Russian: Валентин Григорьевич Вечёрко, romanized: Valentin Grigoryevich Vechyorko; born 7 July 1961) is a Belarusian linguist, politician and former leader (1999–2007) of the Belarusian Popular Front (BNF), a Belarusian opposition party.

== Early life and education ==
Vincuk Viačorka was born on 7 July 1961 in the Western Belarusian city of Brest.

He graduated from the Faculty of philology at the Belarusian State University (1983) and the Institute of Linguistics at the Belarusian Academy of Sciences (1986).

== Professional and political career ==
Vincuk Viačorka worked as a professor at the Maxim Tank Belarusian State Pedagogical University and the Belarusian Humanities Lyceum, as a journalist and the deputy chief redactor of the cultural magazine Spadčyna (Belarusian: Спадчына).

From 1979 on, Viačorka has been an active member of the national-democratic movement in Belarus. He was one of the founders of several juvenile cultural groups and organisations, such as Majstroŭnia (Belarusian: Майстроўня, 1979–1984), Talaka (Belarusian: Талака, 1986–1989), and the Confederation of Belarusian Youth Organisations (Belarusian: Канфэдэрацыя беларускіх моладзевых суполак, romanized: Kanfederacyja belaruskich moladzievych supolak, 1988–1989).

Vincuk Viačorka ran for a seat in the Supreme Soviet of Belarus, but was not successful.

In 1988, he was one of the founders of the Belarusian Popular Front. Viačorka was head of programme documents commission and a member of the party's central board. From 1995 to 1999 he was deputy head of the BPF. In 1999, he was one of the organisers of the Freedom March, a protest against the formation of the Union State between Belarus and Russia.

Vincuk Viačorka is the founder and head of an educational non-governmental organization, the Supolnaść Centre (Belarusian: Цэнтар "Супольнасьць", romanized: Centar "Supolnaść") and was head of the working group of the NGO Assembly of Belarus (1999–2000).

== Personal life and family ==
Vincuk Viačorka speaks several European languages, is married, has two daughters and a son. His wife Aryna is a mathematician. His son Franak is a youth activist for the BNF, and is a former student of the Belarusian Humanities Lyceum. Both Vincuk and his son were featured in the 2006 documentary film by Mirosław Dembiński, A Lesson of Belarusian.

== Publications ==
In 2016, Viačorka published the book "In Belarusian With Vincuk Viačorka", a series of essays based on the eponymous Radio Liberty internet page programme also run by him. Viačorka encourages his audiences to dissect the rules and principles of authentic Belarusian, a tongue which suffered serious distortion in the wake of Communist mandates on “language merger.” Vocabulary and onomastics, grammar and pronunciation, spelling and syntax are all covered in concise, easy to read lessons. Viačorka gives long overdue attention to a distinct and vibrant language which is an indivisible component of the modern European linguo-cultural space.

In 2026, a Belarusian court added the linguistic book "Don't Make My Prepositions Laugh" by Vincuk Viačorka to the list of extremist materials.
