= 1995 Belarusian municipal elections =

Municipal elections in Belarus

1995 Local councils of Republic of Belarus elections
- June 1995

22nd convocation local councils of Republic of Belarus elections were held in June 1995 under plurality voting.

The elections were the least active in terms of citizens participation in the history of Republic of Belarus. They were the only elections not directly controlled by the executive power (so-called "presidential hierarchy"), that, in fact, ignored the fact of the elections.

Start of the conflict between the President and the Supreme Council, establishment of executive power "hierarchy", multiround parliamentary election and referendum on crucial socio-economic and political issues, led to civil indifference towards politics, as citizens were absolutely disoriented in such conditions.

All levels of mass media almost ignored the elections, having printed only election commission registered candidates lists. Elections were held in so-called "summer cottage season" and catholic holiday of Pentecost. As a result, first round turnout amounted to 48,1% of the total number of voters. Under the effective legislation election could be considered as taken place, in case being participated by over 50% of voters.

In a first round on 11 June 94,7% deputies of rural councils, 73,2% deputies of town councils, 48,5% deputies of urban councils in local cities, 17,5% deputies of urban district councils, 29,5% deputies of urban councils, 8,5% deputies of district councils, and 44% deputies of regional councils were elected. In Minsk elections did not take place in any electoral district. Out of 45 electoral districts in Vitebsk, only 1 appeared such where elections took place.

61,3% of voters participated in the second voting on the 25 June. Elections took place in 24 330 electoral districts out of 28 244; in 853 electoral districts elections took place, but no candidate was elected.

Resulting in 2 rounds significant part of local Councils was not elected in the amount sufficient for quorum. An attempt to additionally elect local councils was made in late November, however it also failed.
