= Minsk City Council of Deputies =

Minsk City Council of Deputies Мінскі гарадскі савет дэпутатаў
- 29th legislature

Type
- Type: Unicameral

History
- Founded: 17 March 1917; 109 years ago (historical) 15 March 1994; 32 years ago (modern)

Leadership
- Chairman: Artsem Tsuran, Independent

Structure
- Seats: 57
- Length of term: 4 years

Elections
- Voting system: Majoritarian
- First election: 1920 (historical) June 1995 (modern)
- Last election: 25 February 2024

Meeting place
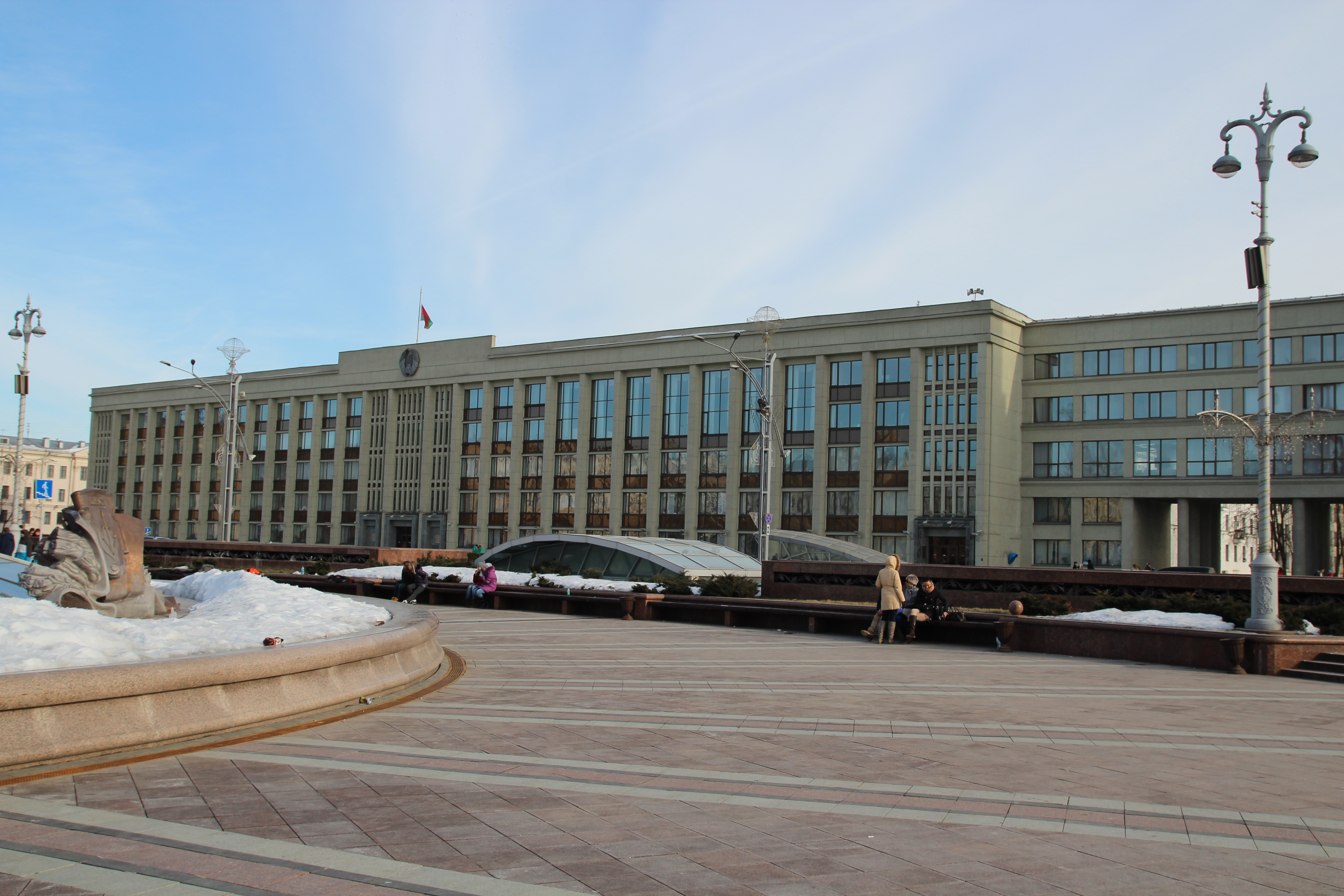
- Independence Square, Minsk

Website
- minsk.gov.by/ru/org/8630

Minsk City Council of Deputies (Belarusian: Мінскі гарадскі Савет дэпутатаў, romanized: Minski haradski Saviet deputataŭ; abbreviated as Minsk City Council (Belarusian: Мінгарсавет, Minharsaviet) is a representative body, unicameral city council of the Belarusian capital of Minsk. It is composed of 57 deputies elected by the majoritarian system. The term of office of the Minsk City Council of Deputies is 4 years. It was established on 17 March 1917 after the February Revolution. The last elections were held on 25 February 2024.

== History ==
The Minsk City Council of Workers' and Soldiers' Deputies was elected on 17 March 1917, by decision of the meeting of the Bolsheviks of Minsk and the Western Front, almost immediately after the February Revolution in Russia, and its first meeting was held on 21 March 1917. The chairman of the executive committee from 17 March was Boris Pozern, from 21 July 1917 Isidor Lyubimov, and from October, Karl Lander. The printed organ was "Izvestia of the Minsk Council of Workers' and Soldiers' Deputies". According to the charter, the executive committee initially included 18 (later 16) representatives from industrial enterprises, 18 (then 20) from military units, one each from the General Jewish Labour Bund, Russian Social Democratic Labour Party, Socialist Revolutionary Party and also from the Council of Peasants' Deputies.

In the period prior to the October Revolution the council actively participated in the convening of the 1st Congress of Military and Workers' Deputies of the Armies and Rear of the Western Front. On 10 September 1917, together with the Front Committee, it created a temporary committee of the Western Front to combat the Kornilov affair, and on September 18 it adopted a resolution on the nationalization of the main branches of industry and the immediate transfer of land to the peasants. After re-elections in September 1917, the Bolsheviks received 184 seats out of 337, and received complete power in the Presidium.

On 7 November 1917, at the midst of the October Revolution, Order No. 1 of the Executive Committee of the Minsk Council was issued, proclaiming Soviet power in Minsk. On 9 November, on the initiative of the Council, the Military Revolutionary Committee of the Western Front was convened, which included members of the Presidium. On 15 November 1917, the Council took full power into its own hands. Due to the occupation of Minsk by German troops, it ceased its activities on 20 February 1918. After the taking of the city in December 1918 by the Red Army, the Minsk Council of Workers' and Red Army Deputies was elected. In January 1919 the Byelorussian Soviet Socialist Republic was formally established.

On 8 May 1919, during the Operation Minsk in the Soviet-Polish War, at a joint meeting of the Minsk City Council of Workers' and Soldiers' Deputies together with the Council of Trade Unions and representatives of the city's factory committees, the Minsk Defense Committee (Workers' Defense Committee) was created, with the purpose of assisting the Red Army in defending the city from Polish troops. The Committee consisted of 9 people and spent three months working to provide the front with food and uniforms.

The instructions of the Military Revolutionary Committee of the BSSR noted that citizens who have reached the age of 18, regardless of religion, nationality, settlement, gender, earning a living through productive and socially useful work, soldiers, as well as persons engaged in housekeeping, employees and other categories who do not use hired labor, have the right to be elected. Private traders, clergy, including monks, former police officers, members of the royal family in Russia, the mentally ill and those convicted of crimes were deprived of the right to vote and be elected. In 1920, out of 58,000 working people, 43,600 people participated in the elections of the Minsk City Council. Of the 490 deputies, 43 were from the Bund party, the rest of the mandates were received by the Bolsheviks.

Following the creation of the Byelorussian Soviet Socialist Republic and the accession of it to the Soviet Union, in 1922 the Minsk City Council adopted massive renaming of streets, places, and enterprises. In 1925, a decision was made to organize free hot breakfasts, milk and buns for children in schools. Similar decrees were transformed over time into documents on the creation of kindergartens, holiday camps, sanatoriums, sports camps, schools.

The activities of the Minsk City Council of Workers' and Soldiers' Deputies were suspended due to the German occupation of Byelorussia in June 1941. The City Executive Committee resumed its activities in July 1944. The first post-war session of the council took place in 1945.

The 1977 Constitution of the Soviet Union, transformed the councils of workers' deputies into councils of people's deputies hence the city council changed its name to the Minsk City Council of People's Deputies (Russian: Минский городской Совет народных депутатов). On 15 March 1994, at the meeting of the 13th session of the Supreme Council of Belarus of the twelfth convocation, the Constitution of the Republic of Belarus was adopted. From that moment on, the city councils in the country were renamed City Council of Deputies thus the Minsk city council received its current name. Unlike other city councils in the post-Soviet sphere, such as the Moscow City Duma or the Kyiv City Council which have nullified the numbering of the convocations following their first elections after the dissolution of the Soviet Union, the Minsk City Council of Deputies convocations numbering are in consecutive numbering to the Soviet period, thus the city council that was convened following the 1995 Belarusian municipal elections which was the first election to that body in independent Belarus was numbered as the 22nd convocation, succeeding the 21st convocation which was elected in 1990, still in the Soviet period.

== Powers ==
The Minsk City Council of Deputies decides and directs the strategy in various spheres including economy, market reforms, external economic activity enterprises and organizations of transport and communication, housing, communal services and power engineering, city planning, services industry, public health services, physical training, sport and tourism, education and culture, social security and public relations.

According to Article 121 of the Constitution of the Republic of Belarus, the exclusive competence of the Minsk City Council includes:

- Approval of economic and social development programs, the budget of the city of Minsk and reports on their implementation;
- Establishment of local taxes and fees;
- Determination of the procedure for managing and disposing of municipal property;
- Appointment of local referendums;
- Approves the candidacy of the Chairman of the Minsk City Executive Committee, appointed by the President of Belarus;
- Elects 8 members of the Council of the Republic, the upper house of the National Assembly of the Republic of Belarus from the city of Minsk.

== Chairmen ==
- Vasily Panasyuk (6 February 2013 – 3 March 2020)
- Andrei Bugrov (2020–2024)
- Artsem Tsuran (5 March 2024 – present)

== Composition ==
The 29th convocation was elected on 25 February 2024:

Party	Deputies
Independent	13
Belaya Rus	35
Communist Party of Belarus	4
Republican Party of Labour and Justice	8

=== Previous elections ===
==== 24th convocation ====
The 24th convocation was elected in 2 March 2003:

Party	Deputies
Independent	54
Belarusian Social Sporting Party	1

==== 26th convocation ====
The 26th convocation was elected on 25 April 2010:

Party	Deputies
Independent	52
Communist Party of Belarus	2
Republican Party of Labour and Justice	1
Belarusian Social Sporting Party	2

==== 27th convocation ====
The 27th convocation was elected on 23 March 2014:

Party	Deputies
Independent	48
Communist Party of Belarus	5
Republican Party of Labour and Justice	2
Belarusian Social Sporting Party	2

==== 28th convocation ====
The 28th convocation was elected in 18 February 2018:

Party	Deputies
Independent	40
Communist Party of Belarus	6
Republican Party of Labour and Justice	5
Belarusian Social Sporting Party	3
Liberal Democratic Party of Belarus	1
Belarusian Patriotic Party	1
Belarusian Agrarian Party	1
