= 1999 Belarusian municipal elections =

Municipal elections in Belarus

1999 Local councils of Republic of Belarus elections
- April 1999

The 23rd convocation local councils of Republic of Belarus elections were held in April 1999.

== Context ==
In 1998 the "Elections of local deputies" law was adopted. The regulation limiting the heads of Councils from holding office for more than two consecutive terms was abolished. Amendments to the law limited the participation of opposition parties' activists. Those convicted of for, for example, participation in demonstrations or unauthorized protests and meetings, were banned. The law complicated the process of candidate selection, and deprived non-governmental organizations of the right to nominate candidates to municipal elections, although workers' associations maintained that right.

After events of the mid-1990s, Belarusian society remained politically indifferent to the local governance system. Ruling elites, despite numerous objections by political opponents, took local political processes under control and increased citizen participation. Authorities organized an effective election process, functioning without competition or alternative candidates. Local authorities were almost totally purged of opposition elements and subordinated to the governing center.

On 1 February 1999, political parties and non-governmental organizations had to re-registered under new rules.

On 23 December 1998, according to the resolution of "Congress of republican democratic forces", opposition parties rejected participation in elections, as "there are no conditions for a free and democratic election process in Belarus", and refused to nominate candidates.

== Elections ==
24,557 deputy seats were contested by 27,362 candidates. 66.3% of eligible voters participated. A significant part of the electoral districts had no alternative candidate. The Liberal Democratic Party withdrew its candidates in late March.

Of 24,566 vacant deputy seats, 24,058 were filled (97.9%). Even though most opposition political parties boycotted the elections, opposition communists managed active campaigns and nominated over 750 candidates, 250 of whom won their deputy seats. Party candidates were also delegated from the Party of Popular Accord and Slavic Council.

== Sources ==
- Натчык, Пётра (Natchyk, Piotra). "Мясцовыя Выбары 1999 Году." [1999 Municipal Elections] Essay. In Палітычная Гісторыя Незалежнай Беларусі (Да 2006 г.) [Political history of independent Belarus], 2nd ed., 381–385. Białystok; Vilnius, Poland; Lithuania: Беларускае гістарычнае таварыства [Belarusian historic society]; Інстытут беларусістыкі [Institute of Belarusian studies], 2011.
- Opposition and 2010 elections: time to return into politics (in Belarusian)
