= Belarusian Humanities Lyceum =

Coordinates: 53.9194°N 27.6001°E

The Yakub Kolas Belarusian Humanities Lyceum (Belarusian: Беларускі гуманітарны ліцэй імя Якуба Коласа, romanized: Byelaruski humanitarny litsey imya Yakuba Kolasa) is a private secondary school, formerly located at 21 Kiraw Street in Minsk, Belarus.

== History ==
It was founded in January 1990 in Minsk as a Sunday school. In September 1991, it became a permanent full-time lyceum under the Belarusian Humanitarian Education and Cultural Center.

== Peculiarities ==
It had subsidiaries in other towns of Belarus, as for example in Swetlogorsk. The duration of the study was 4 years (from grade 8 to grade 11).

== Closure ==
Serious conflicts with the Belarusian authorities started in the mid 1990s after Alexander Lukashenko became the first president of the Republic of Belarus.

In June 2003, the Council of Ministers of Belarus ordered the Ministry of Education to close the lyceum down by adopting a relevant resolution. In the months that followed, students, parents and teachers fought to keep the school open, both diplomatically and through protest, but to no avail. The lyceum went underground shortly thereafter, becoming a private institution with its present name.

Since it went underground, the lyceum conducted separate training sessions in Poland (Warsaw, Gdansk, Zakopane, Szklarska Poręba, Starachowice), Lithuania (Vilnius) and France (Aurec-sur-Loire). In 2005-2015, Andrzej Wajda, Krzysztof Zanussi, Lech Wałęsa, Tadeusz Mazowiecki, Henryk Wuez, Bronisław Geremek, Andrzej Sewerin met with lyceum students and teachers during their studies abroad. In 2009, Maria Kaczyńska, the First Lady of Poland at the time, met with lyceum students in the Presidential Palace in Warsaw. In 2014, Anna Komorowska, the subsequent First Lady of Poland, met with students and teachers of the lyceum. In Minsk, Vice Speaker of the European Parliament Janusz Onyszkiewicz, Gdansk Mayor Paweł Adamowicz, Russian writer and human rights activist Alexei Simonow, as well as many other cultural and scientific figures from Belarus and abroad met with lyceum students.

In 2015, the lyceum marked its 25th anniversary. In 2004-2016 more than 200 students graduated from the lyceum. As of September 2016, there were 60 students and 14 teachers. The lyceum and two secondary schools in Gdańsk, Poland, signed a cooperation agreement which allows lyceum students take courses in these schools, take exams and receive relevant certificates.

== References in popular culture ==
The lyceum was featured in the 2006 documentary A Lesson of Belarusian. The documentary's central character, Franak Viačorka, is a former student of the lyceum and the son of its co-founder, Vincuk Viačorka. Uladzimir Kolas, the school principal, is also featured in the documentary.
