= Ales Michalevic =

Belarusian politician and pro-democracy activist

Ales Michalevic Алесь Міхалевіч Алесь Михалевич
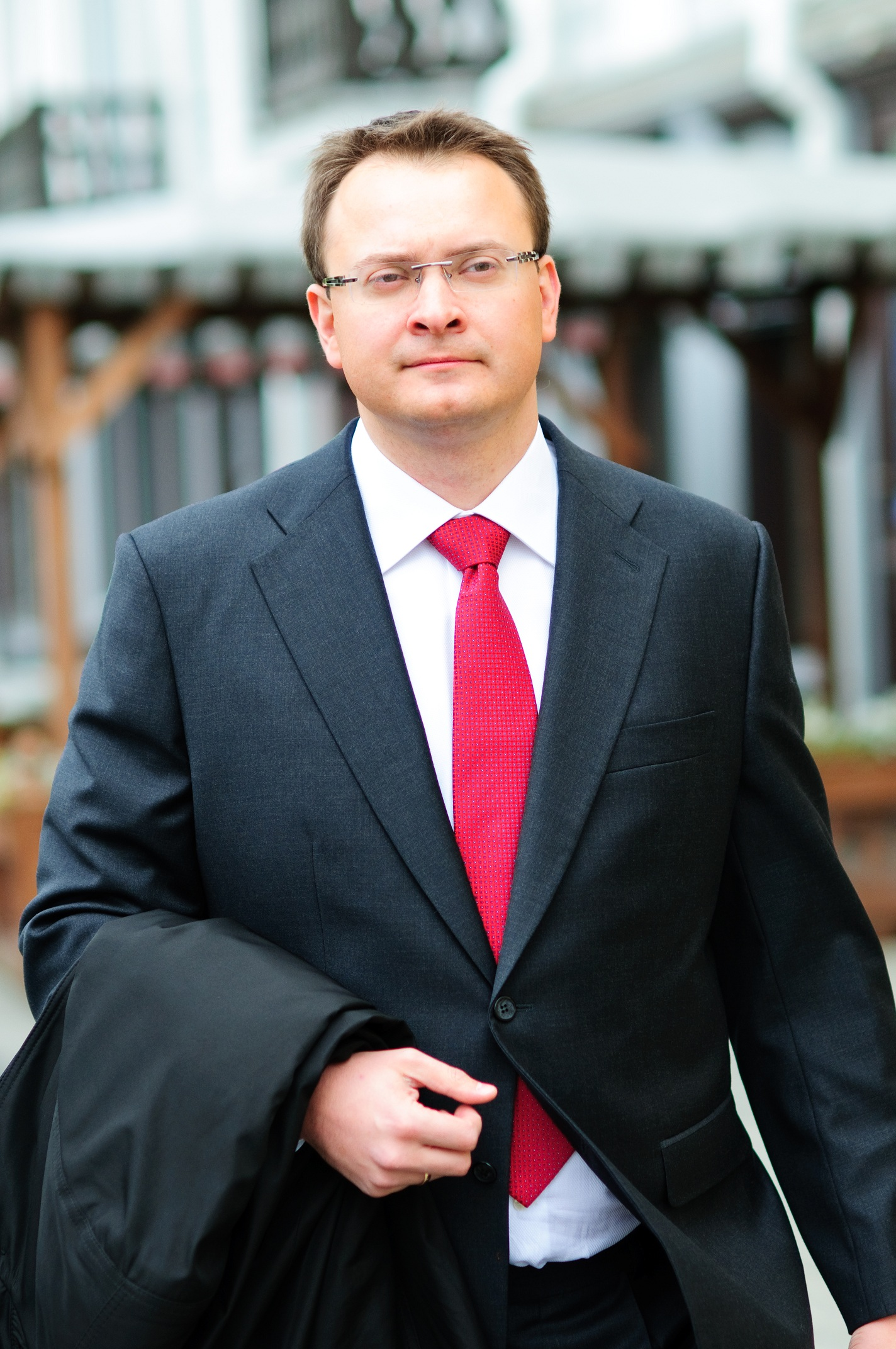
- Born: May 15, 1975 (age 51); Minsk, Byelorussian SSR
- Other names: Aliaksei Mikhalevich; Ales Mikhalevich
- Education: Belarusian State University
- Occupations: lawyer, politician
- Spouse: Divorced
- Awards: John Humphrey Freedom Award

Ales (Alaksiej) Anatoljevich Michalevic (Belarusian: Але́сь Мiхале́вiч, Aleś Michalevič, Ales Mikhalevich, born 15 May 1975 in Minsk, Byelorussian SSR) is a Belarusian public figure and politician, candidate in the 2010 Belarusian presidential election.

== Early life and education ==
Michalevic was born in Minsk to a family of research associates of the National Academy of Sciences of Belarus.

Following studies in Minsk at mathematics school No. 19 and the Belarusian Humanities Lyceum, Michalevic attended the Belarusian State University, Faculty of Law, graduating in 1997 with a degree in Political Science and Law. While at university, Michalevic headed the Belarusian Students’ Association, a non-governmental organization dedicated to protecting the rights of Belarusian students. Michalevic also undertook periods of study at the University of Warsaw (Poland) and University of Oxford (UK). In 2013 Michalevic pursued PhD in political science at Polish Academy of Sciences (the doctoral dissertation title is "Parties and Movements in the Process of Post-Communist Transformation").

In 1997, Michalevic founded and became the leader of an organization working in the sphere of youth exchanges and youth tourism. Starting 2000, Michalevic worked as deputy director and later General Director of a tourist company. Following Michalevic's participation in the 2004 Belarusian parliamentary election, his company became target of numerous state controls and inspections which led to Michalevic resigning from his position.

In 2005, Michalevic qualified as a crisis manager accredited at the Ministry of Economics of the Belarus. In 2007-08 he worked as a legal consultant at the Association of Disabled Veterans of the War in Afghanistan, and in 2008-10 he worked as a lawyer at the Belarusian Independent Trade Union.

== Political activities ==
Michalevic was deputy chairman of the Partyja BNF in 2004–2008.

Following his nomination to the position of party chairman in 2008 and proposal of a program of reforms, Michalevic was expelled from the party for publicly criticizing the party leadership.

From 2003 to 2007, Michalevic was deputy to the Pukhavichy district council and coordinator of the Assembly of Deputies to Local Councils. At the same time he published a local newspaper in the town of Maryina Horka.

He initiated a number of decisions on widening the powers of local self-governing bodies.

On 27 January 2010, Michalevic officially launched his campaign seeking nomination as an independent candidate in 2011 Belarusian presidential election.

On November 18, 2010, Michalevic officially registered as a presidential candidate.

On December 19, 2010, Michalevic took part in the meeting in downtown Minsk but did not take part in the demonstration and riots that followed. He went home downtown where he was with his family.

On December 20, 2010, at the election night Michalevic was arrested by KGB agents in his apartment in Minsk. He was charged for organizing of mass riots. On 11 January 2011, Amnesty International recognized him as a prisoner of conscience.

January 11, 2011 Michalevic called from the KGB jail to his wife. Under the pressure of a voice heard in the phone, Michalevic asked her to not go to Brussels and Warsaw to give a speech at EU-parliament and Polish Sejm hearings regarding Belarus. His wife interpreted this as if her husband in fact told her to go there. The night between January 12 and January 13 the car in which Milana Michalevic and their youngest daughter was traveling to Poland was stopped by KGB agents. Milana Michalevic was informed that she was banned from travel abroad until her husband's future is decided by the KGB. Currently Michalevic's wife is under the close observation of KGB agents in Minsk.

On February 19, 2011, Michalevic was released from prison. After that, he made a statement in which he claimed that he and other political prisoners had been subjected to tortures.

Soon after his statements about tortures in Belarusian prisons, Michalevic secretly escaped the country. On 24 March 2011 he was granted political asylum in the Czech Republic.

On 18 November 2011 Michalevic received the Rights & Democracy John Humphrey Freedom Award from Canadian International Centre for Human Rights and Democratic Development. Michalevic was awarded “for his courage, determination and perseverance, and … efforts to make Belarus a free and open democracy”.

On 8 September 2015 Ales Michalevic returned home to Belarus. He took the train Vilnius - Minsk and was immediately arrested at the border as a “person who is in the wanted list” by the border officers. Michalevic was released but he still remains the last accused person in the 2010 case of “mass riots”.

In March 2016 the case against Ales Michalevic was suspended, however it can be reopened at any moment.

== Personal ==
Divorced father of two daughters. In addition to his native Belarusian and Russian, Ales is fluent in Polish and English and is learning German.
