= Digital Communication Network =

Organization based in Estonia

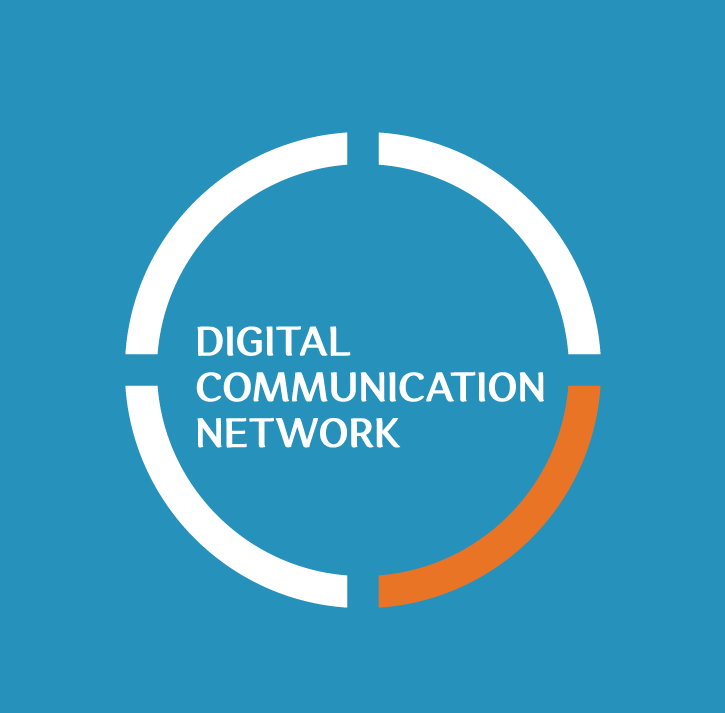
Digital Communication Network - short version of the logo

Digital Communication Network (referred to as DigiComNet or DCN) is a non-profit communication association founded in 2016. It is run by the board, selected out of the existing members of the network.

== History ==
Digital Communication Network, founded in 2016 after the same name program by the US Department of State, is a 6.000 member strong collaborative network that connects professionals of the digital age from a variety of backgrounds, in order to generate ideas, tools, and products for media outlets, civil society organizations, businesses and public authorities. Its main activities include professional trainings and workshops for media and related professionals as well as enhancing digital skills. Among DCN's biggest projects is an exchange program, funded by the US Department of State, and run by World Learning. The program invites nearly twenty media professionals from Eastern Europe and Central Asia for a three-weeks long internship in different media in the United States.

== Today ==
The organization aims to facilitate the collaboration between media, civic entrepreneurs, businesses, policymakers, creative, tech, and other professionals around the ideas of digital innovation, entrepreneurship, and open Internet. The organization has over 6,000 members mostly from Eastern Europe and Central Asia.

The association develops projects in the following areas:

- Exchange programs for communication professionals;
- Camps, trainings, networking events, hackathons (ranging from international conferences to local meetups)
- Research on trends and best practices;
- Product development of the digital tools, content, and educational materials.

== Activities ==
Among the organization’s biggest projects is an exchange program, funded by the US Department of State and run by World Learning called Digital Communication Network exchange. The program invites nearly twenty media professionals from Eastern Europe and Central Asia for a three-weeks long internship in different media in the United States.

Digital Communication Network is associated with different projects such as the Rockit Conferences (co-organised with Granat), which bring together activists from civil society, journalists, tech developers, and businesses. Other projects include workshops and trainings for media and other professionals such as Training for Trainers camps

=== History of all events ===
Here is the list of the events the Digital Communication network has helped organize or co-organized.

1. Rockit Conference, Chisinau, Moldova, Feb 5–6, 2016
2. Language of disruptors. A digital talk, Tallinn, Estonia, March 10, 2016
3. Forum on Fact Checking for Political Journalism, Vilnius, Lithuania, Aug 19–20, 2016
4. TechCampWAW, Warsaw, Poland, Feb 15–16, 2017
5. Rockit Digital Summit, Warsaw, Poland, Feb 16–17, 2017
6. Digital Disruption Forum, Kyiv, Ukraine, Apr 3–4, 2017
7. Rockit Conference 2017, Chisinau, Moldova, May 11–12, 2017
8. Online Education Camp, Poiana Brasov, Romania, Aug 10–13, 2017
9. Business of Truth. Digital Impact, Belgrade, Serbia, Sep 8–9, 2017
10. DataFest Tbilisi 2017, Tbilisi, Georgia, Nov 15–17, 2017
11. Digital Communication Training for Trainers Camp, Ukraine, Apr 19–21, 2018
12. Future for Digital: Big Media, Big Changes, Gdansk, Poland, Apr 26–27, 2018
13. Rockit Conference 2018, Chisinau, Moldova, April 27, 2018
14. Digital Transformation Forum / Governance x Watchdogs, Bucharest, Romania, May 3–4, 2018
15. Digital Influencers Hub Forum, Thessaloniki, Greece, September 13-14, 2018
16. Business of Truth Forum, Johannesburg, South Africa, November 29-30, 2018
17. Media Literacy 360° Forum and Fair, Bratislava, Slovakia, December 11-12, 2018
18. Digital Influencers in Action Forum, Budva, Montenegro, June 18-19, 2019
19. Humor and Games for Social Good, Yerevan, Armenia, September 6-7, 2019
20. Rockit Conference 2019, Chisinau, Moldova, October 11, 2019
21. Media Literacy Solutions Forum, Minsk, Belarus, October 18-19, 2019
22. Launching event of DCN Southeast Europe Hub, Thessaloniki, Greece, December 13, 2019
23. Digital Storytelling for Impact Forum, Sofia, Bulgaria, December 16-17, 2019
24. Rockit Conference 2020, Chisinau, Moldova, May 8-9, 2020
25. Mediaboost, Ukraine, June-December, 2020
26. The Day After Covid-19 #digitaltroubleshooting, Thessaloniki, Greece, July 15, 2020
27. Future of Democracy, Chisinau, Moldova, Sep 29, 2020
28. Unlocking the truth with digital literacy, DCN Africa, October 6, 2020
29. Games for Impact, Warsaw, Poland, December 8-11, 2020
30. Combating Disinformation in South-East Asia, Online Event, December 10, 2020
