= Dzmitry Wus =

Belarusian lawyer and businessman

Dzmitry Wus (Belarusian: Дзмітрый Вус, Russian: Дмитрий Усс, Dmitry Uss) is a Belarusian lawyer and businessman. He was a presidential candidate at the 2010 presidential election in Belarus.

Born in Minsk, Dzmitry Us graduated from the University of Hrodna. Since 1992 he was director of the Trivium publishing house, the largest publisher of geographic maps in Belarus.

In 1999-2003, Mr. Us was member of the Minsk city council.

On 26 May 2011, Dzmitry Us was sentenced to 5.5 years in a medium security penal colony.
