= 2012 Belarusian parliamentary election =

- 23 September 2012
- All 110 seats in the House of Representatives; 56 seats needed for a majority
- Turnout: 74.61% (▼2.13pp)
Party	Leader	Vote %	Seats	+/–
CPB	Tatsyana Holubeva	2.74	3	−3
RPTS	Vasil Zadnyaprany	1.53	1	+1
BAP	Mikhail Rusy	0.79	1	0
Independents	–	75.49	105	+2
This lists parties that won seats. See the complete results below.
Speaker of the House of Representatives before	Speaker of the House of Representatives after
Vladimir Andreichenko; CPB	Vladimir Andreichenko; CPB

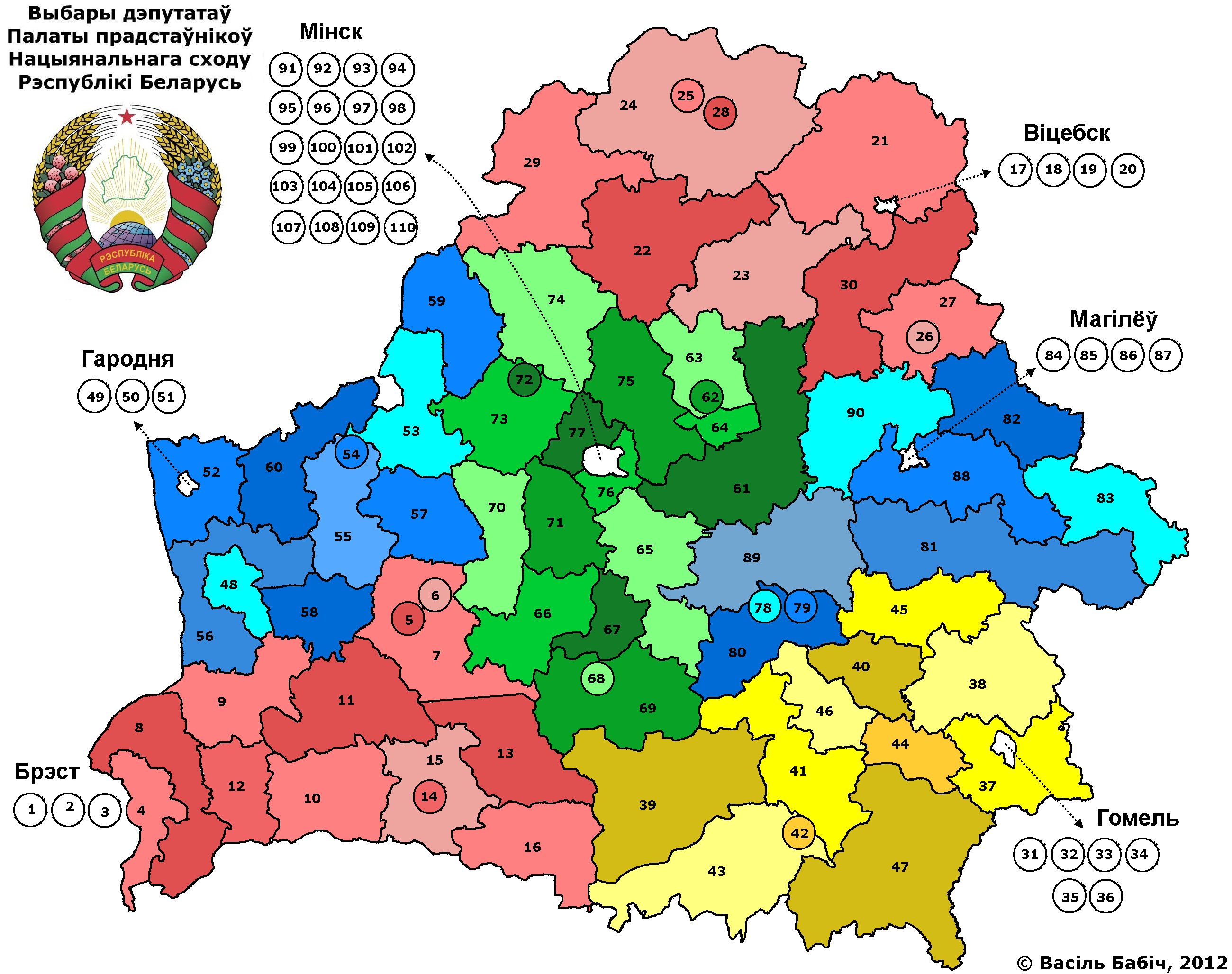
Map with constituency boundaries

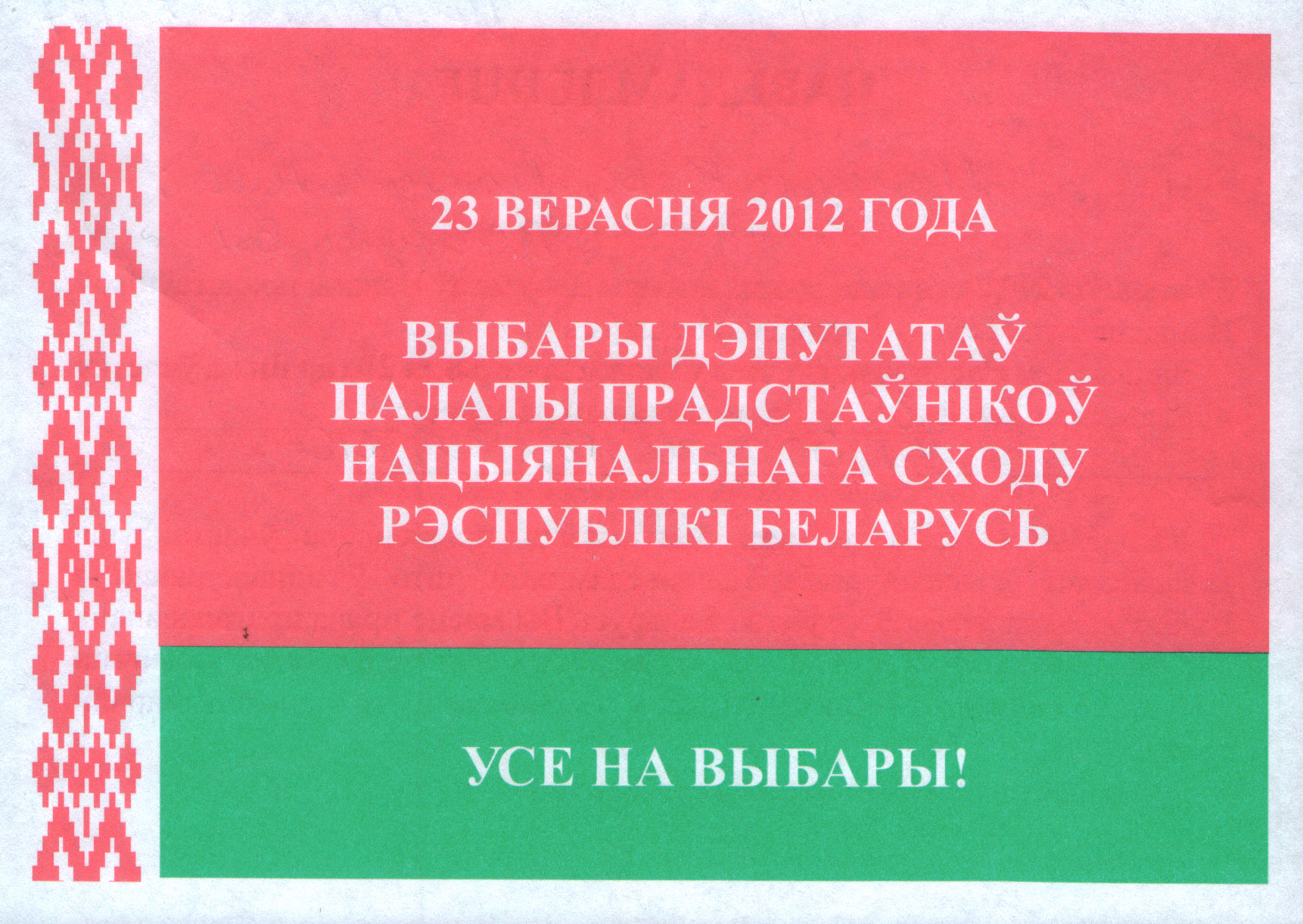
Invitation to vote.

Parliamentary elections were held in Belarus on 23 September 2012. At stake were the 110 seats in the House of Representatives, the lower house of the National Assembly of Belarus.

== Electoral system ==
According to the 1994 electoral law, the 110 members of the House of Representatives were elected in single-member districts. Winning candidates had to achieve an absolute majority of the vote in their constituency and turnout was required to be 50% or more. If neither were achieved, a second round would have been held, contested by the two candidates from the first round with the most votes. For the second round the turnout threshold was reduced to 25%, except in cases in which there is only one candidate contesting the second round, in which case it was abolished. If only one candidate ran in the second round, they still had to achieve a majority of the vote.

The voting age was set at 18, whilst candidates had to be at least 21. Members of the Council of the Republic and members of a local councils were ineligible for election to the House of Representatives. Candidates had to collect at least 1,000 signatures from voters in the constituency they intended to run in.

Voting centres were open from 08:00 to around 20:00. Four previous days of early voting for students, armed service staff and police resulted in at a voter turnout of at least 19%, according to the election commission.

== Campaign ==
The elections were contested by the Communist Party, the Liberal Democratic Party, the United Left Party "A Just World", the Belarusian Social Democratic Party, the Republican Party of Labour and Justice, the Belarusian Socialist Sporting Party and the Agrarian Party. The BPF Party and the United Civic Party both pulled out of the election a week before polling day. Sixteen seats were uncontested.

Following the 2010 presidential election and the consequent arrests of activists and candidates, including Andrei Sannikov and Vladimir Neklyayev were reportedly absent from the political limelight. Alexander Milinkevich, who ran in the 2006 presidential election tried to register as a candidate for the elections but was disqualified for "technical reasons."

The two main opposition parties, including the United Civic Party (UCP), called for voters to go fishing or pick mushrooms in avoiding to vote so as not to give the election and new parliament legitimacy. The UCP posted a video on YouTube that showed its activists picking mushrooms, playing chess and reading books as an alternative to voting. Party leader Anatoly Lebedko also said that protests were banned and groups could not hand out leaflets, with those who tried being stopped by police and the leaflets being seized. President Alexander Lukashenko reacted by saying that the opposition parties were "afraid of going to the people." In turn, opposition activists accused the government of inducing higher education students to vote sometimes under the threat of losing subsidies for accommodation. In the week prior to the election, state security police broke up gatherings of activists that had sought to urge potential voters to cook borshch instead, while several of them were arrested along with media photographers. Some of photographers were later released after about two hours. Independent political analyst Alexander Klaskovsky was quoted as saying: "The opposition is virtually broken. It has few resources and there is no real programme."

== Results ==
109 of 110 MPs were elected receiving an absolute majority with the necessary turnout, with only the constituency of Novobelitsky failing to elect a candidate in the first round. Of the independent candidates, 63 were members of Belaya Rus.

The Central Election Commission declared voter turnout had been at least 65.9%, thus validating the result. However, other independent monitors suggested a turnout of 30%. Vitaly Rymashevsky, the co-chairman of the Belarus Christian Democracy party, said: "The election commission is unscrupulously lying as these figures are so radically different from those of observers." On 23 September, Lidya Yermoshina, the head of the CEC, said that with a final tally for 109 seats it was "doubtful" that the opposition won any seats.

The vacant seat was later taken by an independent.

Party	Votes	%	Seats	+/–
Liberal Democratic Party	249,455	4.84	0	0
Communist Party of Belarus	141,095	2.74	3	–3
Belarusian Left Party "A Just World"	98,288	1.91	0	0
Republican Party of Labour and Justice	79,078	1.53	1	+1
Belarusian Agrarian Party	40,488	0.79	1	0
Belarusian Social Democratic Party (Assembly)	38,471	0.75	0	0
Belarusian Social Sporting Party	6,921	0.13	0	0
BPF Party	2,789	0.05	0	0
Independents	3,892,324	75.49	104	+1
Vacant			1	–
Against all	606,887	11.77	–	–
Total	5,155,796	100.00	110	0
Valid votes	5,155,796	98.29		
Invalid/blank votes	89,663	1.71		
Total votes	5,245,459	100.00		
Registered voters/turnout	7,030,430	74.61		
Source: CEC, Parties and Elections in Europe
