= Belarusian Labour Party =

Belarusian Labour Party Беларуская партыя працы Белорусская партия труда
- Abbreviation: BPT (Russian); BPP (Belarusian)
- Leader: Alexander Bukhvostov
- Founded: 25 November 1993
- Banned: 2 August 2004
- Merged into: Belarusian Left Party "A Just World"
- Newspaper: Labour Solidarity
- Membership (2002): 1,077
- Ideology: Social democracy Labourism
- Political position: Centre-left to left-wing
- National affiliation: People's Coalition 5 Plus; United Democratic Forces
- International affiliation: Socialist International
- Colours: Red

Website
- n/a

The Belarusian Labour Party (Belarusian: Беларуская партыя працы, Biełaruskaja Partyja Pracy) is a social-democratic political party in Belarus, that opposes the government of president Alexander Lukashenko. The leader of the party is Alaksandar Buchvostaŭ.

At the last legislative elections, 13–17 October 2004, the party was part of the People's Coalition 5 Plus (Narodnaya Kaalicyja Piaciorka Plus), which failed to secure a seat. These elections fell significantly short of OSCE commitments, according to the OSCE/ODIHR Election Observation Mission. Universal principles and constitutionally guaranteed rights of expression, association and assembly were seriously challenged, calling into question the Belarusian authorities' willingness to respect the concept of political competition on a basis of equal treatment. According to this mission principles of an inclusive democratic process, whereby citizens have the right to seek political office without discrimination, candidates to present their views without obstruction, and voters to learn about them and discuss them freely, were largely ignored.

On August 2, 2004, the Supreme Court of Belarus liquidated the Belarusian Labour Party, and in 2005 some members split from the party to form the Belarusian Social Democratic Party (Assembly).

The party does not have a website.
