= Republican Party (Belarus) =

Former political party in Belarus

- Leader: Uladzimir Belazor
- Founded: 12 March 1994; 32 years ago
- Registered: 25 May 1994; 32 years ago
- Banned: 8 August 2023; 3 years ago
- Headquarters: Minsk
- Ideology: Pro-Lukashenko; Eurasianism; Euroscepticism; Populism; Economic nationalism
- Political position: Centre
- National affiliation: RKSKPPGA

Party flag

Website
- rprb.narod.ru

The Republican Party (Russian: Республиканская партия, romanized: Respublikanskaya partiya; Belarusian: Рэспубліканская партыя, romanized: Respublikanskaja partyja) was a centrist political party in Belarus. It supported the government of president Alexander Lukashenko.

In 2009 Ministry of Justice of the Republic of Belarus issued a written warning because the party did not provide information to the Ministry about their activities.

In 2017, an opinion poll was published that said that 0.7% of Belarusians support RP, and thus as many as BPF Party.

On 8 August 2023, the Republican Party was liquidated by the Supreme Court of Belarus.
