= Conservative Christian Party – BPF =

Banned political party in Belarus

Conservative Christian Party — BPF Кансерватыўна-хрысціянская партыя — БНФ Консервативно-христианская партия — БНФ
- Abbreviation: CChP–BPF (English); KChP–BNF (Belarusian); KHP–BNF (Russian)
- Leader: Zianon Pazniak
- Acting leader (in Belarus): Juryj Bielieńki
- Founded: 26 September 1999; 26 years ago
- Banned: 20 July 2023; 3 years ago
- Split from: BPF Party
- Headquarters: 13th building, Zachodniaja St, Minsk
- Newspaper: Bielaruskija Viedamaści
- Membership (2016): 1,067
- Ideology: Belarusian nationalism National conservatism Social conservatism Christian right
- Political position: Centre-right to right-wing
- Colours: Belarusian national colors: White; Red; White
- Slogan: «Long Live Belarus!» (Belarusian: «Жыве Беларусь!»)

Party flag

Website
- narodnaja-partyja.org

The Conservative Christian Party of the Belarusian People's Front (Belarusian: Кансэрватыўна-Хрысьціянская Партыя - БНФ, romanized: Kanservatyŭna-Chryścijanskaja Partyja BNF; Russian: Консервативно-христианская партия — БНФ, romanized: Konservativno-khristianskaya partiya BNF) is a former political party in Belarus that opposes the government of president Alexander Lukashenko. It was de facto formed after the split of the BPF Party in 1999.

== History ==
The October 2004 legislative elections were boycotted by the party, led by Zianon Pazniak. These elections fell according to the OSCE/ODIHR Election Observation Mission significantly short of OSCE commitments. Universal principles and constitutionally guaranteed rights of expression, association and assembly were seriously challenged, calling into question the Belarusian authorities' willingness to respect the concept of political competition on a basis of equal treatment. Principles of an inclusive democratic process—whereby citizens have the right to seek political office without discrimination, candidates can present their views without obstruction, and voters can learn the views and discuss them freely—were largely ignored.

The Conservative Christian Party refused to join the oppositional coalition led by Alaksandar Milinkievič in 2006, as they cited the inability to ensure ethical behaviour in Lukashenko's administration, in the voting process, and the calculation of votes. The election ended cycle ended with voting falsifications and was not acknowledged by either the EU or the United States.

The party opposed the Russian language having the status of an official language in Belarus, which is a status it was given in the 1995 Belarusian referendum.

The party boycotted all parliamentary elections (2000, 2004, 2008, 2012, 2016) since Lukashenko's consolidation of power in 1996.

On 20 July 2023, the Supreme Court of Belarus decided to liquidate the party.
