= Belarusian Social Sporting Party =

Former political party in Belarus

Belarusian Social Sporting Party Белорусская социально-спортивная партия Беларуская сацыяльна-спартыўная партыя
- Abbreviation: BSSP (English); БССП (Rus/Bel)
- Leader: Vladimir Alexandrovich
- Deputy leader: Elena Klyuikova
- Founded: 6 November 1994; 31 years ago
- Registered: 9 December 1994; 31 years ago
- Banned: 4 September 2023; 2 years ago
- Headquarters: 77th building, Kalinovskogo St, Minsk, 220000
- Membership (2015): 2,500
- Ideology: Social democracy Sports politics Pro-Lukashenko
- National affiliation: RKSKPPGA
- Colours: Yellow
- Slogan: «Health of the people is the welfare of the state» (Belarusian: «Здароўе народа — дабрабыт дзяржавы»)

The Belarusian Social Sporting Party (BSSP; Russian: Белорусская социально-спортивная партия, romanized: Byelorusskaya sotsial'no-sportivnaya partiya; Belarusian: Беларуская сацыяльна-спартыўная партыя, romanized: Bielaruskaja sacyjaĺna-spartyŭnaja partyja) was a political party in Belarus that supported the government of President Alexander Lukashenko. It was founded on 6 November 1994 and was led by Vladimir Alexandrovich.

== History ==
On 6 November 1994, the Constituent Assembly of the party was held, which was registered by the Ministry of Justice of the Republic of Belarus on 9 December 1994. (registration certificate No. 003), re-registered on 13 September 1999 (registration certificate No. 012).

In the parliamentary elections, the party did not nominate candidates on party lists, but only by collecting signatures.

In the 1995 Belarusian parliamentary election, the party received one deputy mandate. In the elections to the House of Representatives of the National Assembly of the Republic of Belarus five years later, only the party chairman V. A. Aleksandrovich won the election from the BSSP, who was elected in the first round on 15 October 2000 from the Mendeleevsky electoral district of Minsk.

In 2015, the deputy chairman of the party, Elena Klyuikova, confirmed that the party deliberately does not nominate candidates for the parliamentary elections, because "work in parliament involves giving up the main activity".

On 4 September 2023 the Belarusian Social Sporting Party was liquidated by the Supreme Court of Belarus.

== Declared goals ==
Assistance in strengthening an economically developed, socially oriented, stable state through the improvement of social norms, the unification of the progressive forces of Belarus for the implementation of social programs that favor the growth of the spiritual, cultural and economic potential of the Belarusian people; attracting public attention to the problems of educating the younger generation, promoting the ideas of citizenship, patriotism and a healthy lifestyle, attracting citizens to participate in local self-government, to solving social problems facing society.

== Election results ==
=== Presidential elections ===
Election	Candidate	First round		Second round		Result
Election	Candidate	Votes	%	Votes	%	Result
1994	Endorsed Alexander Lukashenko	2,646,140	44.82%	4,241,026	80.34%	Elected ✓
2001	Endorsed Alexander Lukashenko	4,666,680	75.65%			Elected ✓
2006	Endorsed Alexander Lukashenko	5,501,249	82.97%			Elected ✓
2010	Endorsed Alexander Lukashenko	5,130,557	79.65%			Elected ✓
2015	Endorsed Alexander Lukashenko	5,102,478	83.47%			Elected ✓
2020	Endorsed Alexander Lukashenko	4,661,075	80.10%			Elected ✓

=== Legislative elections ===
Election	Leader	Performance					Rank	Government
Election	Leader	Votes	%	+/–	Seats	+/–	Rank	Government
1995	Vladimir Alexandrovich				1 / 260	New	12th	Support
2000	Vladimir Alexandrovich				1 / 110	0	▲4th	Support
2004	Vladimir Alexandrovich	Did not contest						Extra-parliamentary
2008	Vladimir Alexandrovich	Did not contest						Extra-parliamentary
2012	Vladimir Alexandrovich	6,921	0.13%	New	0 / 110	0	▼7th	Extra-parliamentary
2016	Vladimir Alexandrovich	Did not contest						Extra-parliamentary
2019	Vladimir Alexandrovich	7,905	0.15%	▲0.02	0 / 110	0	▼12th	Extra-parliamentary
