= 2025 in Belarus =

- Decades: 2000s; 2010s; 2020s
- See also: History of Belarus; List of years in Belarus

Events of the year 2025 in Belarus.

== Incumbents ==
- President – Alexander Lukashenko
- Prime Minister – Roman Golovchenko (until 10 March); Aleksandr Turchin (since 10 March)

== Events ==
Ongoing: Belarusian involvement in the Russo-Ukrainian war; Belarus–European Union border crisis

=== January ===
- 26 January – 2025 Belarusian presidential election: Alexander Lukashenko is reelected for a seventh term with 87.6% of the vote; opposition leaders were not allowed to run and are either exiled or jailed by the regime.

=== February ===
- 5 February – KGB gained access to the Belarusian Hajun project Telegram channel, which published information about the movement of Russian troops and equipment across Belarus, collected via their Telegram bot. KGB got the list of Telegram accounts of people who sent information via the bot. As of October 2025, at least 88 people were arrested.
- 12 February – Three people detained in Belarusian prisons, including an American national and Radio Free Europe/Radio Liberty journalist Andrey Kuznechyk, are released from custody and sent to Lithuania following diplomatic intervention by the US.

=== March ===
- 10 March – Lukashenko appoints Aleksandr Turchin as prime minister.
- 17 March – A Japanese resident of Gomel is convicted and sentenced by the Minsk City Court to seven years' imprisonment for spying for Japanese intelligence.
- 25 March – Lukashenko is inaugurated for a seventh term in office.
- 31 March – An American national is arrested for illegally entering Belarus after being discovered inside an empty train car that had arrived in Maladzyechna from Lithuania.

=== April ===
- 30 April – Youras Ziankovich, a dual US-Belarusian national imprisoned for allegedly plotting to overthrow and assassinate Lukashenko, is released.

=== May ===
- 7 May – Lukashenko issues pardons to 42 imprisoned opposition activists.
- 19 May – Lithuania files a case at the International Court of Justice against Belarus accusing it of organising the trafficking of migrants into its territory.

=== June ===
- 21 June – Opposition leader Sergei Tikhanovsky and 13 other political prisoners are released from prison and deported to Lithuania following a pardon as a result of negotiations with Trump's envoy in Minsk.

=== July ===
- 23 July – Russian president Vladimir Putin signs a law allowing Belarusian citizens living as permanent residents in Russia to vote in local elections and run for local office.
- 25 July – Journalist Danil Palianski is convicted and sentenced to 10 years' imprisonment on charges of treason and revealing state secrets.
- 28 July – the Ukrainian hacker group Silent Crow together with the Belarusian group Cyber Partisans attacked Russian national company Aeroflot; as a result, according to Silent Crow, the IT infrastructure of Aeroflot was "destroyed", multiple flights were delayed or cancelled.

=== September ===
- 3 September – Andrei Podnebenny, a Russian political prisoner sentenced to 16 years' imprisonment by a Belarusian court in 2022 on charges including extremism, arson and vandalism, dies in custody at a jail in Mogilev.
- 4 September – A Polish Carmelite monk is arrested in Lyepyel on charges of spying on military drills involving Russia.
- 8 September – The Czech Security Information Service announces the dismantling of an espionage network operating across several European countries and run by the Belarusian KGB following a joint operation by the Czech Republic, Romania, and Hungary, prompting the expulsion of a Belarusian diplomat in Prague.
- 11 September – The United States lifts sanctions against the Belarusian flag carrier Belavia following the release of 52 political prisoners by the Belarusian government. The prisoners are deported to Lithuania; however, opposition leader Mikola Statkevich refuses to be deported and is returned to prison.
- 12–16 September – The Zapad 2025 joint Russian-Belarusian military exercise is held, prompting Poland to close its border with Belarus.
- 16 September –
  - Lukashenko issues pardons to 25 people convicted on charges of extremism.
  - Journalist Ihar Ilyash is sentenced to four years' imprisonment on charges of extremism.
- 19 September – Belarus expels a Czech diplomat in retaliation for the expulsion of a Belarusian diplomat from the Czech Republic on 8 September.
- 27 September – The International Paralympic Committee lifts the partial suspension of Russia and Belarus from competition that had been imposed since the start of the Russo-Ukrainian war in 2022.

=== October ===
- 13 October – At least 88 people are arrested nationwide on suspicion of involvement with the OSINT military monitoring group Belarusian Hajun that tracked Russian and Belarusian military activity in the country since the beginning of the Russo-Ukrainian war in 2022.
- 22 October – Imprisoned journalist Andrzej Poczobut is awarded the Sakharov Prize for his reporting.
- 27 October – After multiple air balloon incidents, Lithuania closes its border with Belarus until November 30.

=== November ===
- 19 November – Lithuania opens the border.
- 20 November – The Episcopal Conference of Belarus announces the release of two Catholic priests imprisoned on political grounds following negotiations between the government and the Vatican.
- 22 November – Lukashenko issues pardons to 31 Ukrainian nationals.

=== December ===
- 2 December – The Court of Arbitration for Sport overturns a ban imposed by the International Ski and Snowboard Federation on Belarusian athletes competing as neutrals since the start of the Russo-Ukrainian war in 2022.
- 13 December – The government releases 123 political prisoners including opposition leaders Maria Kalesnikava, Maxim Znak, Viktar Babaryka, Nobel laureate Ales Bialiatski, and journalists Pavel Sevyarynets and Marina Zolotova in exchange for the lifting of sanctions on the Belarusian potash industry by the United States.
- 14 December – FIDE allows Belarusian chess players to compete under their national flag for the first time since the start of the Russo-Ukrainian war in 2022.
- 16 December – Lithuanian police arrest 21 people allegedly connected to a criminal network responsible for smuggling cigarettes into the country using weather balloons from Belarus.
- 30 December – the Russian intermediate-range ballistic missile Oreshnik was officially deployed in Belarus. While official location is not disclosed, OSINT analytics think that it can be located near Krichev, around 180 km from the Ukrainian border.

== Belarus-US relations ==
Under Trump, US policy toward Belarus changed from isolation to engagement with Alexander Lukashenko's government. After Keith Kellogg's talks with Lukashenko in Minsk on June 21, 2025, Lukashenko released 14 political prisoners, including Sergei Tikhanovsky.

Before his Alaska meeting with Putin, Trump called Lukashenko and called him "the highly respected President". In response, Lukashenko invited Trump and his family to visit Minsk; Belarusian state media reported that the invitation was accepted. It was the first phone call between Lukashenko and an American president during Lukashenko's 31 year in power.

On September 11, 2025, after a direct appeal from Trump, Belarus released 52 detainees, including 14 foreign nationals, in a step widely interpreted as part of a tentative rapprochement; in exchange, Washington eased certain sanctions on state airline Belavia, and Trump's envoy John Coale discussed reopening the US Embassy in Minsk while delivering a personal letter from Trump to Lukashenko. European officials and analysts noted the move as one of the largest single prisoner releases of Lukashenko's rule but remained wary of Minsk's motives and the absence of deeper reforms. Lukashenko deported the released political prisoners; many of them were taken directly to Lithuania without passports; opposition figures labeled the transfers "forced deportations", arguing that political prisoners should have the right to remain in Belarus. Opposition leader Mikola Statkevich refused to cross into Lithuania and then disappeared, with allies fearing he was rearrested. While some freed prisoners publicly thanked Trump for securing their release, others said they were near the end of their sentences and wanted to go home. Critics also emphasized that the gesture fell well short of the roughly 1,200–1,400 political prisoners still held in Belarusian prisons.

On December 13, 2025, Lukashenko released 123 political prisoners including opposition leaders Maria Kalesnikava, Maxim Znak, Viktar Babaryka, Nobel laureate Ales Bialiatski, and journalists Pavel Sevyarynets and Marina Zolotova in exchange for the lifting of sanctions on the Belarusian potash industry by the United States. They were exiled to Ukraine and Lithuania.

=== Released political prisoners ===
According to Viasna, 342 political prisoners were released in 2025. Counting from June 2025, there were 569 political prisoners released; 189 people were forced to exile. As of 23 December 2025, there are at least 1135 political prisoners in Belarus.

Among the released prisoners are Youras Ziankovich, Sergei Tikhanovsky, Ihar Losik, Maria Kalesnikava, Maxim Znak, Viktar Babaryka, Nobel laureate Ales Bialiatski, Pavel Sevyarynets, Marina Zolotova, Alyaksandr Feduta, Uladzimir Labkovich, Mikola Dziadok.

== Holidays ==
- 1-2 January – New Year's Day
- 7 January – Christmas (Orthodox)
- 8 March – International Women's Day
- 29 April – Radonitsa Day
- 1 May – Labour Day
- 9 May – Victory Day
- 3 July – Independence Day
- 7 November – October Revolution Day
- 25 December – Christmas (Catholic)

== Deaths ==
- 7 January - Svyatlana Yauseeva, 92, poet and writer
- 17 January - Maria Zaitseva, 24, volunteer in the Ukrainian army
- 23 January - Viktar Hardzej, 78, poet and writer
- 27 January - Alyaksandr Anisimau, 62, director
- 4 February - Iosif Navumchyk, 87, politician
- 27 March - Syarhei Knysh, 62, rock musician and sculptor
- 6 April - Michail Pilipenka, 89, enthnographer and historian
- 15 May - Viktar Adzinochka, 62, philosopher
- 20 June - Syamen Bukchyn, 83, writer and literary critic
- 22 June - Radzim Haretski, 95, geologist
- 25 June - Valery Rybarev, 85, director
- 16 July - Vyachka Stankevich, 92, diaspora public figure
- 22 July – Edvard Zaikouski, 72, archaeologist
- 28 July - John Miszuk, 84, Canadian ice hockey player of Belarusian descent
- 20 August - Viktar Vabishevich, 65, poet and historian
- 22 August - Yaroslav Yevdokimov, 78, singer
- 3 September - Andrej Padnyabenny, 36, political prisoner
- 22 September - Aron Bielski, 98, Jewish partisan, member of Bielski partisans
- 15 October - Maya Yanitskaya, 94, art historian
- 7 November - Vyachaslau Ragoysha, 83, writer
- 1 December - Genadz Pashkou, 77, poet and writer
- 2 December – Anatoli Belyayev, 73, ice hockey player (Dinamo Minsk, Dynamo Moscow).
- 14 December – Viktor Kopytko, 70, composer
- 21 December – Mikita Melkaziorau, 37, journalist and YouTuber
- 23 December – Valyantsin Zankovich, 88, sculptor

== See also ==
- 2025 in Europe
