= 2022 in Belarus =

- Decades: 2000s; 2010s; 2020s
- See also: History of Belarus; List of years in Belarus

Events of the year 2022 in Belarus.

== Incumbents ==
- President – Alexander Lukashenko
- Prime Minister – Roman Golovchenko

== Events ==
Ongoing – COVID-19 pandemic in Belarus

=== January ===
- 27 January – 2021–2022 Belarus–European Union border crisis: Poland begins the construction of a metal wall along the Belarus–Poland border.

=== February ===
- 10 February – Belarus begins a series of joint military exercises with the Russian Armed Forces.
- 24 February – 2022 Russian invasion of Ukraine: Tanks are sighted rolling into Ukraine from Belarus near the Senkivka checkpoint.
- 27 February – The 2022 Belarusian constitutional referendum is held.

=== March ===
- 1 March – The United Kingdom places economic sanctions on Belarus.
- 5 March:
  - 2021–2022 Belarus–European Union border crisis: Security forces launch a raid on a migrant camp in Bruzgi, Grodno Region, expelling large amounts of migrants.
  - 2022 Belarusian Super Cup
- 9 March – The Kastuś Kalinoŭski Battalion is formed.
- 11 March:
  - 2022 Russian invasion of Ukraine: Ukrainian forces allegedly shell the Belarusian village of Kopani. Ukraine denies that it was responsible for the incident, which it says was a false flag operation by Russia to bring Belarus into the war.
  - And now I will show you where the attack on Belarus was prepared from
- 17 March – Polish Land Forces defector Emil Czeczko is found dead in his apartment in Minsk.

=== May ===
- 4 May – Belarus holds large-scale military drills in order to "evaluate the readiness and ability of troops to react rapidly to a possible crisis."
- 6 May – Sofia Sapega, the girlfriend of Belarusian activist Roman Protasevich, with whom she was detained when their flight was diverted by the Belarusian Air Force last year, is sentenced to six years in prison for "inciting social hatred". The exiled Belarusian opposition condemns the verdict.

=== June ===
- 1 June – Taiwan imposes an export ban of all modern computer chips to Russia and Belarus, as well as any technology and equipment used to manufacture them.
- 9 June – Poland decides to lift its state of emergency over attempts by migrants to cross the Belarus–Poland border, saying that the border barrier it has been building is mostly complete.
- 14 June – The United States Tennis Association says that tennis players from Russia and Belarus will be allowed to compete at the upcoming US Open tournament despite the ongoing invasion of Ukraine, which is expected to be held in New York after Wimbledon banned them from doing so.
- 23 June – U.S. sportswear retailer Nike and networking firm Cisco announce that they are permanently ending their operations in Russia and Belarus.
- 25 June – Russia launches dozens of cruise missiles at targets in multiple Ukrainian cities, including Yavoriv, Zhytomyr, and Desna. At least 20 missiles were fired from Belarusian airspace.

=== July ===
- 2 July – Belarusian President Alexander Lukashenko claims that his country intercepted Ukrainian missiles directed at Belarus three days ago and says that Belarus "does not want war with Ukraine".
- 25 July – It is reported that more than 6.5 million people in Belarus have received their first dose of the COVID-19 vaccine.
- 28 July – Russian forces in Belarus launch 25 ballistic missiles into northern Ukraine.

=== August ===
- 3 August – Belarusian journalist Iryna Slaunikava is sentenced to five years in prison amidst a government crackdown on the media following protests that occurred after the 2020 Belarusian presidential election.

=== October ===
- 6 October – Belarusian president Alexander Lukashenko bans price increases as part of an effort to reduce inflation in the country.
- 7 October – Belarusian activist Ales Bialiatski, the Russian human rights society Memorial and the Ukrainian human rights organization The Center for Civil Liberties are awarded the Nobel Peace Prize.
- 10 October – Poland advises its citizens to leave Belarus by "commercial or private means" amid deteriorating relations between the two countries.
- 11 October – Thousands of Russian troops enter Belarus by the "trainload" as Ukrainian President Volodymyr Zelenskyy warns G7 nations that Russia is planning on launching another offensive against Kyiv with direct Belarusian involvement. The troop movements come a day after Belarusian President Alexander Lukashenko accused Ukraine of planning to launch an attack on the country.
- 19 October – Belarus says that it is unable to pay off its debt because of international sanctions imposed due to its role in the Russo-Ukrainian War.

=== December ===
- 7 December – Belarusian lawmakers approve a bill which punishes high treason among officials and military personnel with the death penalty. The bill also includes prosecution for "spreading false information discrediting the Armed Forces of Belarus".

== Deaths ==
- 3 January – Adam Maldzis, historian
- 5 January – Alyaksandr Fyedarovich, footballer
- 12 January – Eduard Vaytsyakhovich, politician
- 19 January – Anatoly Malofeyev, politician
- 5 February – Ernst Sabila, Protestant religious leader
- 24 February – Dmitry Debelka, Olympic wrestler
- 25 March – Galina Skakun, cattle breeder and milkmaid
- 5 April – Yefrem Sokolov, politician
- 2 May – Vitali Dzerbianiou, Olympic weightlifter
- 4 May – Stanislav Shushkevich, first head of state of Independent Belarus
- 26 May – Jan Zaprudnik, historian
- 9 August – Mikalay Slyonkow, politician
- 16 October – Helen Michaluk, activist
- 23 October – Gennadiy Muromtsev, sculptor
- 24 October – Vladimir Kulakov, politician
- 14 November – Aleksandr Sloboda, politician

== See also ==
- COVID-19 pandemic in Europe
- 2022 in Europe
