= 2026 in Belarus =

- Decades: 2000s; 2010s; 2020s
- See also: History of Belarus; List of years in Belarus

Events of the year 2026 in Belarus.

== Incumbents ==
- President – Alexander Lukashenko
- Prime Minister – Aleksandr Turchin

== Events ==
Ongoing: Belarusian involvement in the Russo-Ukrainian war; Belarus–European Union border crisis

=== February ===
- 17 February – The International Paralympic Committee allows Belarusian paralympians to compete under their national flag for the first time since the start of the Russo-Ukrainian war in 2022.
- 20 February – Opposition leader and political prisoner Mikola Statkevich is released from prison after being detained since 2020 following a stroke.
- 25 February – Underground tunnels are found on the Polish-Belarusian border, used for illegal immigration that is described as a "hybrid war" by Russia and Belarus against Poland. According to The Telegraph, the tunnels were constructed by the "specialists from Middle East", likely from the terrorist groups like Hamas, Hezbollah, or ISIS, or from a Kurdish group.
- 27 February – A court in Brest sentences journalists Uladzimir Yanukevich and Andrei Pakalenka to up to 14 years' imprisonment on charges of high treason.

=== March ===
- 5 March – President Lukashenko pardons 18 political prisoners, including 15 for political charges and three who were convicted of unspecified crimes.
- 9 March – A court in Minsk sentences journalist Pavel Dabravolski to nine years' imprisonment on charges of treason.
- 12 March – The International Criminal Court opens an investigation into the forced deportation of critics of the Lukashenko regime into Lithuania following a case filed by the latter country.
- 19 March – The regime releases 250 political prisoners, of which 15 are exiled to Lithuania, in response to the lifting of sanctions on the potash industry and several banks by the US. Among the released are journalist Katsyaryna Andreeva, activist Eduard Palčys, and human rights activists Valyantsin Stefanovich and Marfa Rabkova.

=== April ===
- 9 April – Fifty-two people are arrested on charges of disloyalty following a raid on the offices of the architectural firm ZROBIM in Minsk.
- 13 April – World Aquatics lifts a ban on Russian and Belarusian athletes competing under the national flags that was imposed following the 2022 Russian invasion of Ukraine.
- 28 April – Five Polish and Moldovan nationals held by Belarus are released at the border with Poland following a prisoner exchange facilitated by the United States. Among them is Andrzej Poczobut.

=== June ===
- 10 June — Russia and Belarus sign a memorandum of understanding to "harmonize" both countries' judicial systems.
- 29 June — The highest recorded temperature in Belarus is taken in Pinsk, measuring 40 °C (104 °F).

=== September ===
- 8 September — Andrzej Poczobut returns to Belarus.
- 16 September — Belarus releases and exiles 25 political prisoners in exchange for partial US sanctions relief.

== Holidays ==
- 1-2 January – New Year's Day
- 7 January – Christmas (Orthodox)
- 8 March – International Women's Day
- 28 April – Radonitsa Day
- 1 May – Labour Day
- 9 May – Victory Day
- 3 July – Independence Day
- 7 November – October Revolution Day
- 25 December – Christmas (Catholic)

== Deaths ==
- 19 January – Mikalay Korbut, 86, minister of finance (1997–2008)
- 8 February – Kazimierz Wielikosielec, 80, Roman Catholic prelate
- 5 March – Uladzimir Karyzna, 87, poet (national anthem)
- 9 March – Heorhij Halenčanka, 89, historian
- 16 March – Sergey Maksimenko, 71, physicist.
- 14 August – Anatoly Mikhaylov, 89, radiologist
- 7 September – Vadim Popov, 86, speaker of the House of Representatives (2000–2004, 2007–2008) (death announced on this date)
- 22 October – Yury Tsyhalka, 43, footballer (Shakhtyor Soligorsk, Dinamo Minsk, national team).

== See also ==
- 2026 in Europe
