= 2027 in Belarus =

- Decades: 2000s; 2010s; 2020s
- See also: History of Belarus; List of years in Belarus

Events of the year 2027 in Belarus.

== Events ==
=== Predicted and scheduled ===
- 2 August – Solar eclipse of August 2, 2027 (partial eclipse)

== Holidays ==
- 1-2 January – New Year's Day
- 7 January – Christmas (Orthodox)
- 8 March – International Women's Day
- 1 May – Labour Day
- 9 May – Victory Day
- 11 May – Radonitsa Day
- 3 July – Independence Day
- 7 November – October Revolution Day
- 25 December – Christmas (Catholic)
