= 2024 in Belarus =

- Decades: 2000s; 2010s; 2020s
- See also: History of Belarus; List of years in Belarus

Events of the year 2024 in Belarus.

== Incumbents ==
- President – Alexander Lukashenko
- Prime Minister – Roman Golovchenko

== Events ==
Ongoing: Belarusian involvement in Russian invasion of Ukraine; Belarus–European Union border crisis

=== February ===
- 21 February – President Alexander Lukashenko calls for armed security patrols on streets and in workplaces, claiming the possibility of "extremist" crimes.
- 25 February –
  - 2024 Belarusian parliamentary election Voting is held to elect members of the National Assembly of the Republic of Belarus, the All-Belarusian People's Assembly, and local councils, with only four pro-government parties permitted to run. Opposition leader Sviatlana Tsikhanouskaya urges Belarusians to boycott the elections, pledging to hold elections to the Coordination Council in May of this year.
  - President Lukashenko pledges to run in the next Belarusian presidential election.

=== April ===
- 4 April – 2024 Belarusian Council of the Republic election
- 5 April – President Lukashenko announces that Belarus will suspend its participation in the Treaty on Conventional Armed Forces in Europe.
- 25 April – The State Security Committee of the Republic of Belarus says that it had thwarted drone attacks on Minsk launched from Lithuania, which the latter denies.

=== June ===
- 6 June – German national Rico Krieger goes on trial in Belarus on charges of mercenarism, terrorism, creating an extremist group, intentionally damaging a vehicle, and illegal operations with firearms, ammunition, and explosives.
- 10 June – Poland announces a "no-go zone" in the Białowieża Forest in order to prevent migrants from crossing the border from Belarus.

=== July ===
- 4 July –
  - Belarus frees ten political prisoners including former opposition leader Ryhor Kastusioŭ.
  - The Shanghai Cooperation Organization officially grants membership to Belarus.
- 14 July – Six people are killed in a storm that hits the south of the country.
- 15 July – Latvia issues a ban on Belarus-registered passenger vehicles entering its territory from Belarus or Russia.
- 17 July – Lithuania issues a ban on Belarus-registered passenger vehicles entering its territory.
- 19 July –
  - Belarus introduces visa-free entry to citizens of 35 European countries including the United Kingdom, Norway and Switzerland.
  - The Minsk Regional Court, in a secretive trial, sentences Rico Krieger to death over alleged crimes including terrorism and mercenary activity. He is pardoned on 30 July by President Lukashenko.
- 22 July – Mikalai Kazlou, the leader of the banned opposition United Civic Party, is released after 2.5 years in prison.

=== August ===
- 5 August – The European Union imposes sanctions on 28 Belarusian officials including those in the interior ministry and the judiciary for the role in human rights violations and persecution of opponents of President Lukashenko.
- 18 August – President Lukashenko reports that nearly one third of the Belarusian Army has been deployed along the Belarus–Ukraine border, in response to Ukraine stationing more than 120,000 troops at the border. However, Ukraine claims no movement of Belarusian troops has been observed.
- 22 August – Belarus and China agree to greatly strengthen mutual trade, financial, energy, and security cooperation, which includes enhancing industrial supply chains and collaboration with the Guangdong-Hong Kong-Macau Greater Bay Area.

=== September ===
- 4 September – President Lukashenko issues pardons for 30 people convicted of participating in the 2020–2021 Belarusian protests.
- 5 September –
  - The Belarusian defence ministry says that its forces had shot down drones that had violated the country's airspace following reports of incidents in the Gomel Region.
  - Belarus announces the arrest in July of a Japanese resident of Gomel on suspicion of spying on vital installations along the border with Ukraine on behalf of Japanese intelligence services.
- 6 September – Polish prosecutors charge three Belarusian citizens for diverting Ryanair Flight 4978 in 2021 under a fabricated bomb threat to arrest political activist Roman Protasevich and his girlfriend Sofia Sapega.
- 24 September – Jörg Dornau, a lawmaker for the far-right Alternative for Germany party in Saxony, is revealed to be using Belarusian political prisoners as labour by independent Belarusian news outlet Reform.news.
- 27 September – President Lukashenko warns that Belarus will use nuclear weapons if attacked by the West.

=== October ===
- 4 October – A court convicts 12 people, seven of them in absentia, over their role in the Machulishchy air base attack in 2023 and sentences them to up to 25 years' imprisonment.
- 23 October – A court in Gomel convicts two Ukrainian nationals of plotting terrorist attacks and sentences them to 20 years' imprisonment.

=== November ===
- 7 November – President Lukashenko issues pardons for 31 political prisoners.
- 20 November – President Lukashenko issues pardons for 32 prisoners convicted for "extremist crimes".
- 22 November – In a speech at Minsk State Linguistic University, President Lukashenko threatens to shutdown the Internet if there are mass protests before the upcoming presidential election after the previous election saw mass protests broke out.

=== December ===
- 10 December – Journalist Volha Radzivonava is convicted by the Minsk City Court of “insulting the president” and “discrediting Belarus” and sentences her to four years' imprisonment.
- 24 December – Dzmitry Kuchuk, the leader of the defunct Belarusian Green Party, is convicted of gross violations of public order and incitement to undermine national security and sentenced to six years' imprisonment.
- 28 December – President Lukashenko issues pardons for 20 prisoners convicted for "extremist crimes".
- 30 December – Henrykh Akalatovich becomes the first Catholic priest to be convicted on politically-related treason charges in Belarus since independence in 1991 and is sentenced to 11 years' imprisonment.

== Holidays ==
- 1-2 January – New Year's Day
- 7 January – Orthodox Christmas
- 8 March – International Women's Day
- 1 May – Labour Day
- 9 May – Victory Day
- 14 May – Radonitsa Day
- 3 July – Independence Day
- 7 November – October Revolution Day
- 25 December – Christmas Day

== See also ==
- 2024 in the European Union
- 2024 in Europe
