= Blanda (disambiguation) =

Blanda is a river in Iceland.

Blanda may refer to:

- Blanda (city), an ancient city in Lucania, Italy
- George Blanda (1927–2010), American football player

Blanda may also refer to:

- Blanes (Latin: Blanda), a city in Girona, Spain
