= Youras Ziankovich =

Belarusian politician, journalist and lawyer

- Юрий Леонидович Зенкович; Юрась Леанідавіч Зянковіч
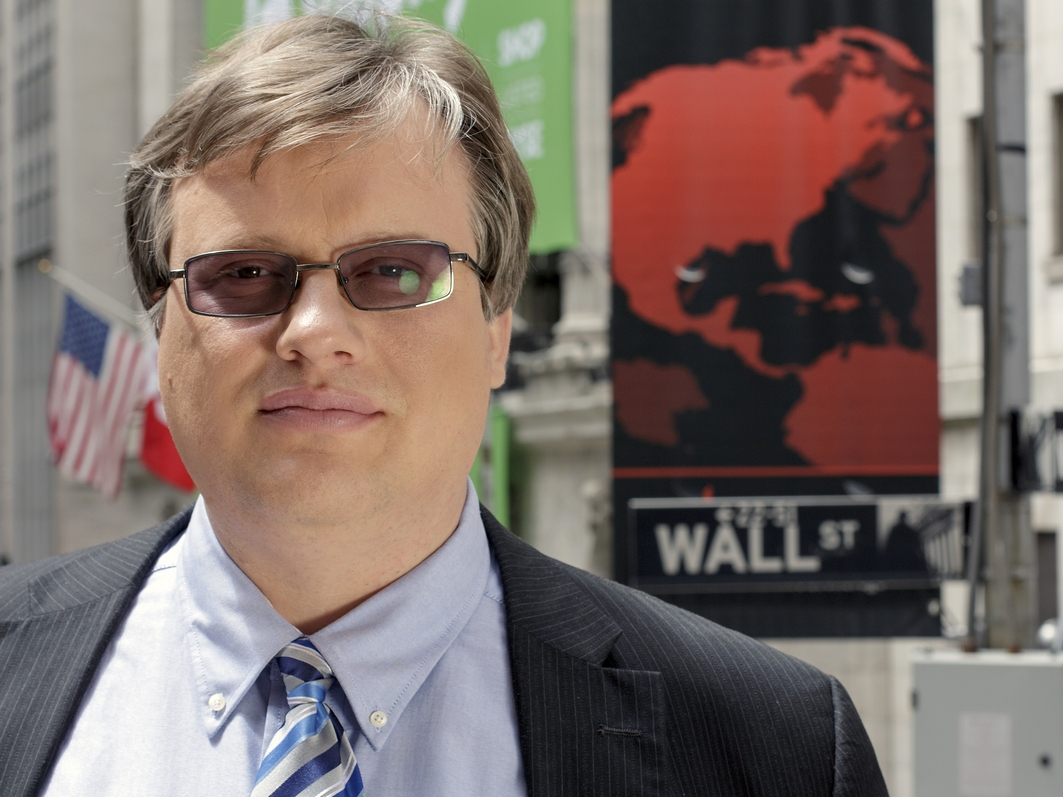
- Born: 31 October 1977 (age 48); Minsk, Byelorussian SSR
- Education: Ukrainian Academy of Banking; Fordham University
- Occupations: Politician, writer, social activist
- Political party: Belarusian Popular Front

Youras Ziankovich (Belarusian: Юрась (Юрый) Леанідавіч Зянковіч; born 31 October 1977, Minsk) is a Belarusian opposition politician, journalist and American lawyer. In 2003–2007 he was a deputy of the Minsk Regional Council of Deputies.

== Biography ==
Born on October 31, 1977, in Minsk. Lived in the village of Zhdanovichi, Minsk District, Minsk Region, Belarusian SSR. Ziankovich graduated from Mathematical School No. 50 in Minsk and entered the Faculty of Applied Mathematics of the Belarusian State University. There he joined the democratic movement, he joined the Union of Belarusian Students and the Free Trade Union of Students. After the first year, he decided to change his study profile and entered the law faculty of BSU. However, right before the beginning of the academic year, he received a message that he was enrolled "by mistake." As a result, he went to study in Poland, where he studied shortly at the Maria Curie-Skłodowska University and at the University of Warsaw. At the same time, he cooperated with the Belarusian media, he was a correspondent of the newspaper "Belarusian Rynak" and an in-house correspondent of the Belarusian Telegraph Agency.

He graduated from the Ukrainian Academy of Banking of the National Bank of Ukraine in Sumy, receiving a higher legal education.

Since 1999, he is the Chairman of the Belarusian Popular Front faction Minsk Regional Council, member of the Sejm and the Board of the Belarusian Popular Front party. In December 2000, he headed the executive office of the Assembly of Democratic NGOs. In April 2003, he was elected as a deputy of the Minsk District Council of Deputies and the Zhdanovitsky Village Council of Deputies. In 2004 parliamentary election he ran for the House of Representatives of the National Assembly of Belarus. According to official results, he received 9.3% of the vote and did not win a seat in parliament.

In 2007 he left for the USA. In 2012, he received a Master's degree in American Law from Fordham University (New York). He has lived and worked as an attorney in New York State since 2010.

On September 30, 2017, the national congress of the Belarusian Popular Front party nominated Youras Ziankovich and Aleksei Yanukevich as party candidates for the post of President of Belarus

During 2020-2021 protests against the falsification of the 2020 presidential elections in Belarus in August 2020, he came to Belarus, where he was detained and sentenced to 10 days in Myadzyel. While in custody, he went on a hunger strike

On April 12, 2021, he was detained by the KGB of Belarus together with the FSB of Russia in Moscow. Ziankovich, Alyaksandr Feduta and Ryhor Kastusioŭ were accused of attempting a military coup. On September 5, 2022, the Minsk District Court sentenced Ziankovich to 11 years of imprisonment. Belarusian human rights organizations have recognized Ziankovich as a political prisoner. In December 2022, he was additionally tried on charges of insulting a government official, and in August 2024, on charges of malicious disobedience to the administration of a correctional facility. April 30, 2025, Ziankovich was released and left Belarus.

During the elections to the 4th Convocation of the Coordination Council, Youras Ziankovich headed electoral list No. 8, the Alliance of Belarusian Political Prisoners "Acting Belarusians". As a result of the elections the Alliance received 4.21% of the vote and secured four seats. As a result, Youras Ziankovich was also elected as a delegate to the Coordination Council.
