= Kazimierz Wielikosielec =

Belarusian Roman Catholic bishop (1945–2026)

Kazimierz Wielikosielec O.P.
- Auxiliary Bishop Emeritus of Pinsk
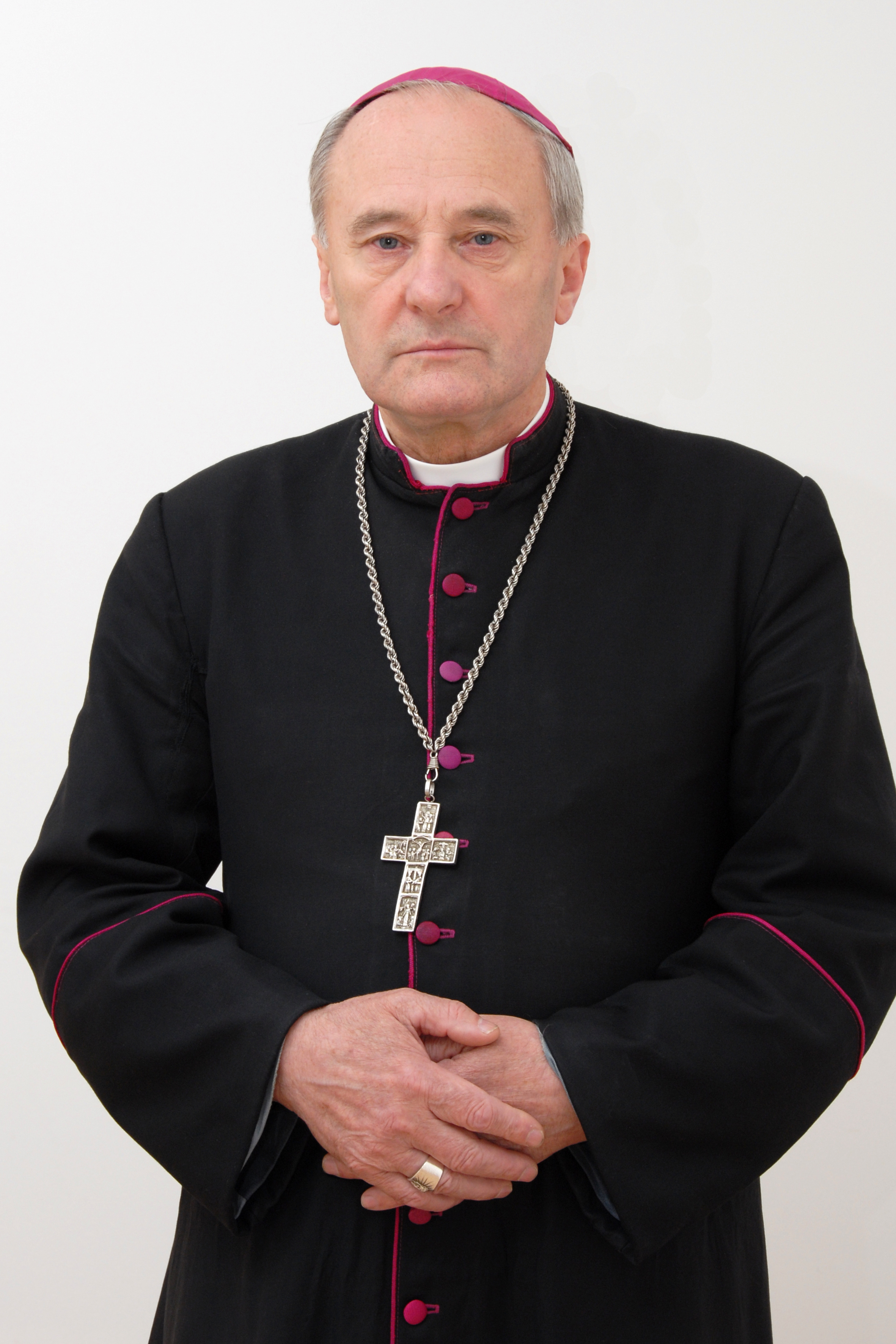
- Wielikosielec in 2007
- Native name: Казімір Вялікаселец (Belarusian); Казимир Великоселец (Russian)
- Church: Catholic Church
- Archdiocese: Minsk-Mohilev
- Diocese: Pinsk
- Appointed: 6 May 1999
- Term ended: 10 October 2024
- Other posts: Titular Bishop of Blanda Julia (1999–2026); Apostolic Administrator of Minsk-Mohilev (2021)

Orders
- Ordination: 3 June 1984 by Julijans Vaivods
- Consecration: 24 June 1999 by Kazimierz Świątek, Dominik Hrušovský and Aleksander Kaszkiewicz

Personal details
- Born: 5 May 1945 Staravolia, Byelorussian SSR, USSR
- Died: 8 February 2026 (aged 80) Gomel, Belarus
- Motto: Fiat voluntas tua

Styles of Kazimierz Wielikosielec
- Reference style: His Excellency; The Most Reverend
- Spoken style: Your Excellency
- Religious style: Bishop

Kazimierz Wielikosielec (Belarusian: Казімір Вялікаселец, Kazimir Vialikaselets; 5 May 1945 – 8 February 2026) was a Belarusian prelate of the Catholic Church and a Dominican. From 1992, he was the Vicar General and Dean of the Diocese of Pinsk deanery in Baranavichy, and from 1999 an auxiliary bishop of the Diocese of Pinsk. In January 2021, he was appointed Apostolic Administrator of the Archdiocese of Minsk–Mohilev.

== Biography ==
Vialikaselets was born in the village Staravolia, Pruzhany District on 5 May 1945. In 1981, he was admitted to the seminary in Riga. While studying at the seminary, he joined the Order of Dominican Fathers. After graduating from the seminary in 1984, Vialikaselets was ordained a priest by Cardinal Julijans Vaivods and was directed to his first parish of the Holy Trinity in Ishkaldz, Brest Region, Belarus. Because in those days priests were lacking, he also oversaw Catholic parishes in several neighbouring villages located in Hrodna Region and Minsk Region. In addition to the pastoral ministry, Father Vialikaselets dealt with the reconstruction and renovation of temples.

In 1992 he was appointed Vicar General of the Diocese of Pinsk, while performing duties of dean of the Baranavichy Deconate and pastor of the Church of the Holy Cross in Baranavichy.

On 24 June 1999, Vialikaselets was consecrated Bishop at the Cathedral of Pinsk by Cardinal Kazimir Sviontak.

On 3 January 2021, Vialikasieliets was appointed Apostolic Administrator of the Roman Catholic Archdiocese of Minsk–Mohilev following the resignation of Archbishop Tadevush Kandrusevich.

Vialikaselets retired on 10 October 2024, and died on 8 February 2026, at the age of 80.

Catholic Church titles
Preceded by —	Auxiliary Bishop of Pinsk; 1999–2024	Succeeded by —
Preceded by Miguel Pedro Mundo	Titular Bishop of Blanda Julia; 1999–2026	Succeeded by Vacant
