= Sergey Maksimenko =

Belarusian physicist (1954–2026)

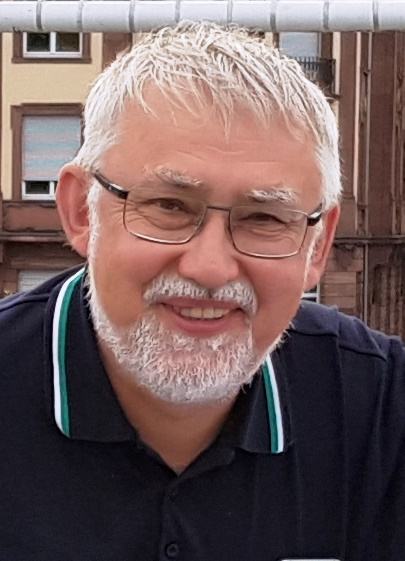
Maksimenko in 2018

Sergey Afanasievich Maksimenko (Russian: Сергей Афанасьевич Максименко; 13 August 1954 – 16 March 2026) was a Belarusian physicist.

== Life and career ==
Maksimenko was born in Krivichi on 13 August 1954. In 1976, he graduated from the Faculty of Physics of the Belarusian State University.

From 2004 to 2008, and again from 2013 to 2026, he was a member of the General Meeting of the National Academy of Sciences of Belarus. From 2008 to 2019, he was a member of the Expert Council of the Higher Attestation Commission of the Republic of Belarus. He was awarded the Certificate of Honor of the Higher Attestation Commission of the Republic of Belarus (2019).

Maksimenko died on 16 March 2026, at the age of 72.

== Awards ==
- 2010: Honorary title "Honored Worker of BSU".
- 2020: Francysk Skaryna Medal.
- 2025: Honoured Scientist of the Republic of Belarus.
