= Alaksiej Janukievich =

Belarusian politician

- Аляксей Янукевіч
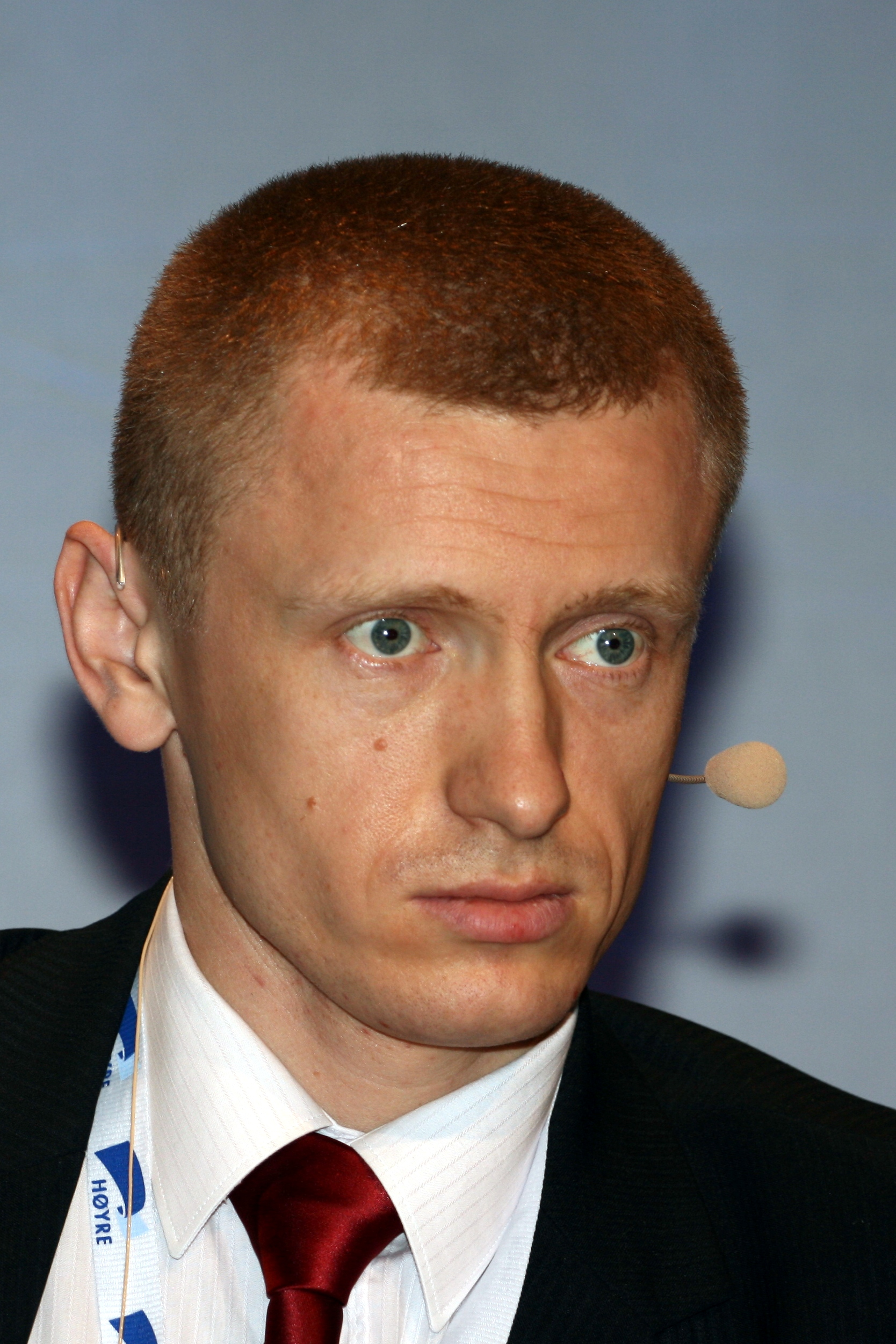
- Janukievich in May 2009

Chairman of the Belarusian People's Front
- In office 5 September 2009 – 30 September 2017
- Preceded by: Lyavon Barshchewski
- Succeeded by: Ryhor Kastusioŭ

Personal details
- Born: Alaksiej Antonavich Janukievich; 30 June 1976 (age 50) Minsk, Belorussian SSR, USSR
- Party: BPF Party
- Education: Belarusian State Economic University

Alaksiej Janukievich (Belarusian: Аляксей Янукевіч, born June 30, 1976) is a Belarusian politician and leader of the Partyja BNF political party.

== Biography ==
Janukievich graduated from the Belarusian State Economic University in 1997.

Since 1996, he has been a member of the Partyja BNF, holding senior positions in the party since 1999.

Janukievich was also one of the founding members of Malady Front.

In October 2009 Alaksiej Janukievich was elected head of the Partyja BNF.

== Awards ==
- I Love Belarus (2010)
