= 2023 in Belarus =

- Decades: 2000s; 2010s; 2020s
- See also: History of Belarus; List of years in Belarus

Events of the year 2023 in Belarus.

== Incumbents ==
- President – Alexander Lukashenko
- Prime Minister – Roman Golovchenko

== Events ==
Ongoing: Belarusian involvement in Russian invasion of Ukraine; Belarus–European Union border crisis

- 7 February: A court in Minsk sentences Polish-Belarusian activist Andrzej Poczobut to eight years in prison for his criticism of president Alexander Lukashenko.
- 26 February: Belarusian opposition partisans launched a drone attack on Russian aircraft at the Machulishchy air base.
- 3 March: A court in Minsk, sentences human rights activist and 2022 Nobel Peace laureate Ales Bialiatski to 10 years in prison over "financing actions violating public order" and smuggling.
- 6 March: A court in Belarus sentences five opposition politicians after a trial in absentia. Pavel Latushka was sentenced to 18 years, Sviatlana Tsikhanouskaya to 15 years, and Maryya Maroz, Volha Kavalkova and Siarhei Dylevski to 12 years.
- 9 March: President Alexander Lukashenko signs a bill into law which allows the use of the death penalty on officials and military servicemen convicted of high treason.
- 25 March: Russian President Vladimir Putin announces that Russia will station tactical nuclear weapons in Belarus by July. The nuclear missiles will be operated by Russian forces. It will be the first time that Russian nuclear weapons have been deployed abroad since 1996.
- 10 August: A mass grave is discovered near the city of Dzyarzhynsk, Belarus, believed to contain either the remains of a church cemetery, the inhabitants of the city's Jewish ghetto, or Calvinists.
- 2 September:
  - Belarus says a Polish military Mi-24 military helicopter breached its airspace, flying 1.2 km into its territory.
  - More than 2,000 troops from the CTSO security alliance begin military exercises in Belarus.
- 14 September: The European Parliament issues a resolution calling on the International Criminal Court to consider charges against Belarusian president Alexander Lukashenko for crimes against humanity allegedly committed in his role in child abductions during the Russian invasion of Ukraine.
- 15 September: President of Belarus Alexander Lukashenko proposes a three-way alliance between Belarus, Russia and North Korea during a meeting with President of Russia Vladimir Putin.
- 19 September: The trial of former SOBR officer Yury Harauski begins in St. Gallen, Switzerland over the enforced disappearances of Viktar Hanchar, Yury Zacharanka, and Anatol Krasoŭski. Harauski pleads guilty and claims that Dmitri Pavlichenko executed the three pro-democracy activists.
- 31 October: An explosion occurs at a military base near the agrotown of Kalodziščy in central Belarus. The Ministry of Defence claims that the explosion was deliberately orchestrated.

== Sports ==
- 2023 CIS Games
- 2022–23 Belarusian Cup
