= Liavon Barščeŭski =

Belarusian translator and politician

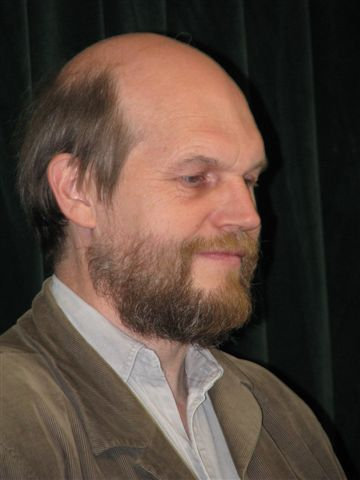
- Born: Лявон Баршчэўскі; March 4, 1958 (age 68); Polotsk
- Education: Minsk State Linguistic University
- Occupations: Philologist, politician

Liavon Barščeŭski (Belarusian: Лявон Баршчэўскі) (born March 4, 1958) is a Belarusian philologist and opposition politician.

He was a deputy to the Supreme Soviet of Belarus from 1990 to 1996. He is a member of PEN International. From 2007–2009 he was head of the BPF Party, succeeded by Alaksiej Janukievich.

== Early life ==
Barščeŭski was born on March 4, 1958, in Polotsk, then part of the Byelorussian SSR. In 1980 he graduated from Minsk State Linguistic University, majoring in German and English, and in 1989 he obtained his Candidate of Philological Sciences from his alma mater.

== Political career ==
Since 1995 he has been deputy chairman of the Belarusian Popular Front "Revival", and was from 1996 to 1999 chairman of the party before parts of the party split in late 1999.

From 2007 to 2009 he was head of the BPF Party, an opposition party. He was elected as a compromisor to prevent a split in the party and a supporter of cooperation with Alexander Milinkevich. However, ultimately, in 2009 after leaving as head of the party he criticized the Belarusian Popular Front that supported Milinkevich as aligning too closely with Alexander Lukashenko and that it was not a genuine opposition force. In a 2010 interview, he defined his political viewpoints as wanting Belarus to start becoming more Belarusian, maintaining a civilized relationship with Russia, and cooperating with the European Union if the EU's economic pragmatism does not interfere in Belarus's development. In 2011, he left the party alongside many other prominent members, saying that the party was no longer an opposition force, it had removed promising young members in leadership, and that the party had supported people in leadership with little support.
