= Smart Networks =

Belarus-based think tank

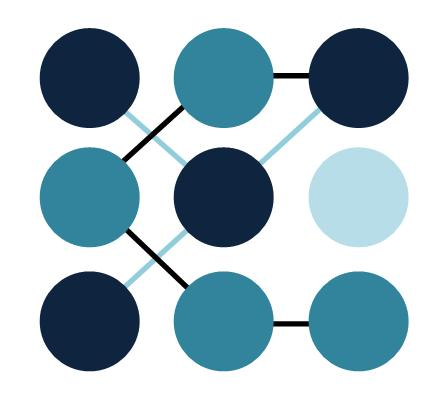
- Project logo
- Founded: October 2012
- Founder: Informational-Analytical Center under the Administration of President of the Republic of Belarus, Ministry of Education of the Republic of Belarus, Republican Institute of Higher Education, Belarusian State University, Minsk State Linguistic University
- Type: youth think tank
- Purpose: Domestic Policy, Economy, Foreign Policy, Information Society
- Location: Minsk, Belarus
- Members: about 150 analysts
- Website: vk.com/umnye_seti_news

Smart Networks (Russian: "Умные сети" (Russian pronunciation: [ʊˈmnɨɪ ˈsʲetʲɪ])) is a Belarusian project which was designed to search for, select and teach young analysts for the state administration. The project was initiated by the Informational-Analytical Center under the Administration of President of the Republic of Belarus, the Ministry of Education of the Republic of Belarus, the Republican Institute of Higher Education, Belarusian State University and Minsk State Linguistic University. In October 2012, the project began with the formations of an analytical community of 150 young people.

== Participants ==
The Smart Networks project participants are citizens of Belarus who are under thirty-five years of age and who have received at a minimum, a Bachelor or Master's academic degree. They have the analytical ability and interest in political matters to create a product which can be used by the government of Belarus to benefit the state. There is also an element of self-development for the participants. Preference in choosing participants was given to those people with English and Chinese skills.

== History ==
Alexey Macevilo, the project coordinator said,

"We started the project because we were searching analysts for our Center. It is clear, that we have enough experienced staff members, who cope with their duties well. But there are also some modern challenges we have to respond. Technology challenges first of all. They do change the society. Social interactions move into cyberspace. We need analysts who are able to work in this environment."

and,

"Web-community, formed in "Vkontakte" social network, is turning into something bigger than simply mechanism of selection. In fact it is a core of young analysts network. They are able to handle brainstorming sessions, express-polls, discuss new ideas and projects online."

Umnye Seti (Smart Network) became a discussion platform for young political analysts. In October 2012, two hundred people competed in a qualifying round: 54% were graduate students, 11% postgraduates; and 40% workers. In November 2012 in Minsk, 25 finalists attended a seminar in research methodology and applied political analysis. In January and February 2013, participants worked on individual projects. A social network called Smart Networks became their platform for interaction, exchange of opinions and collaboration.

== Outcomes ==
Participants provided material for Alexander Lukashenko's presidential annual State of the Nation Address to the Belarus people and the National Assembly, which was delivered on 19 April 2013. The State Youth Personnel Policy community developed a virtual debate club. On 6 June 2013, project participants met with representatives of the Belarus government administration. The participants have their projects published in Belaruskaya Dumka (Belarusian Thought), a socio-political magazine.

== Agenda - 2015 ==
The project includes a series of scientific conferences named "Agenda-2015". It is envisioned that participants will propose ideas for the social and economic development of Belarus over the years 2016 to 2020 including: modernisation of the economy, information technology, state youth policy, foreign policy and globalization.

== Criticism ==
The project has been criticised for giving the government a de facto mandate; for failing in its promises to the participants, for example, to offer employment; and for not including citizens of all ages.

== See also ==
- Collective Intelligence
- Crowdsourcing
- Strategic studies
- Think tank
