= Vadzim Sarančukoŭ =

Belarusian politician and dissident

- Вадзім Уладзіміравіч Саранчукоў
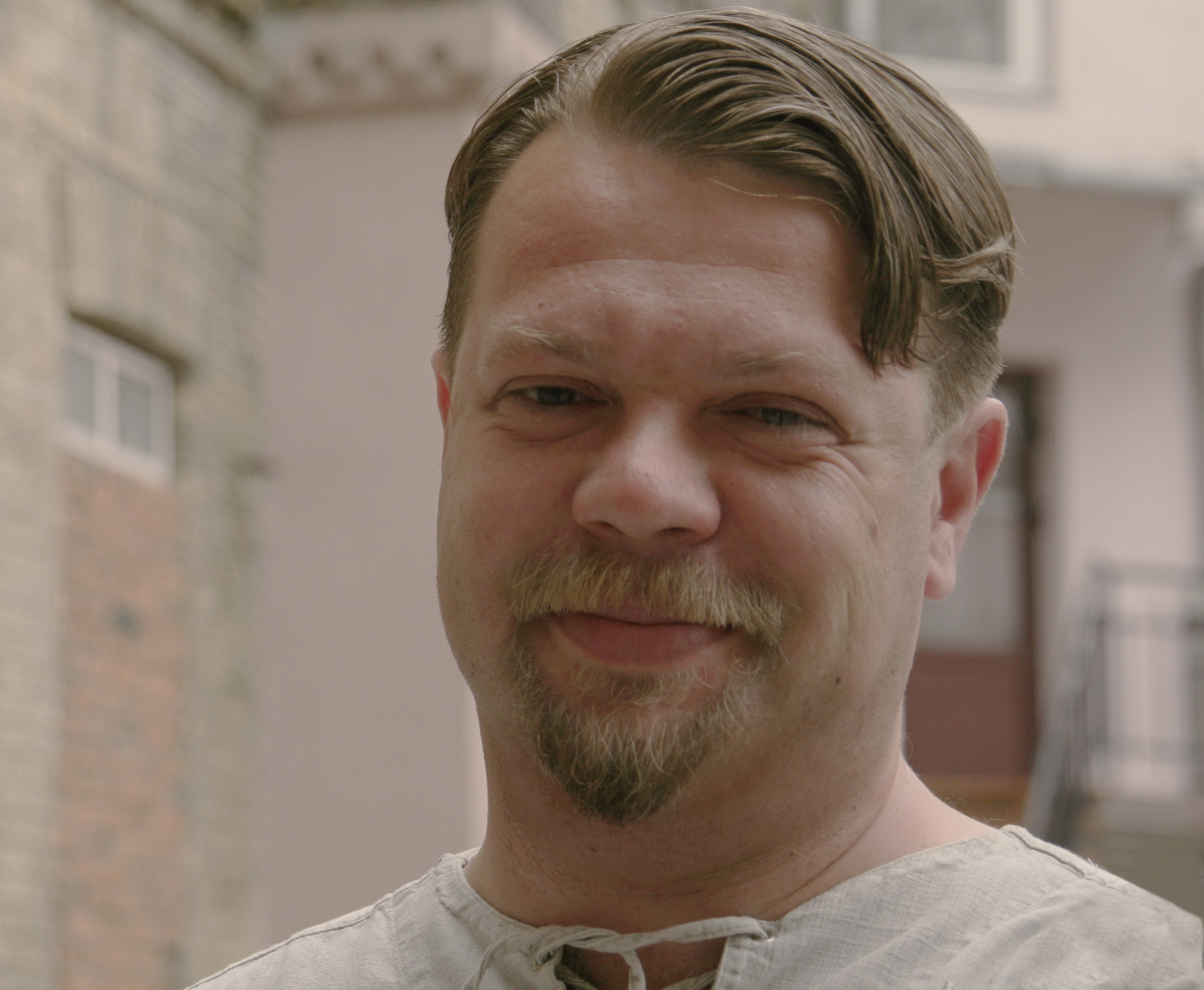

Chair of the BPF Party
- Incumbent
- Assumed office 12 April 2021
- Preceded by: Ryhor Kastusioŭ

Personal details
- Born: 19 April 1980 (age 46) Grodno, Byelorussian SSR
- Party: Belarusian Popular Front
- Education: Yanka Kupala State University of Grodno
- Occupation: Politician, writer, social activist

Vadzim Sarančukoŭ (Belarusian: Вадзім Уладзіміравіч Саранчукоў) (born April 19, 1980) is a Belarusian politician, social activist and dissident. Since April 2021 he is the chairman of the BPF Party.

== Early life and education ==
Sarančukoŭ was born in Grodno on April 19, 1980. He studied from 1998 to 2001 at the Yanka Kupala State University of Grodno and graduated from the Faculty of Law specialising in civil law.

== Career ==
After university he started public activities in the BPF. He was repeatedly arrested. Since 1998, he has been engaged in entrepreneurial activities as well as in political activity. In 2004 he was fined for using the white-red-white flag of the Belarusian opposition.

Sarančukoŭ took part in public performances at the beginning of 2017. Popular demonstrations were caused by the tax on junk food. On March 14, 2017, Sarančukoŭ was brought to administrative responsibility for his activities.

During the 2019 Belarusian parliamentary election he was summoned to the electoral commission after allegedly disturbing materials before sharing them with the commission.

In 2020, Sarančukoŭ did not hold events dedicated to Freedom Day on March 25 due to the COVID-19 pandemic in Belarus. Sarančukoŭ refused to participate in the 2020 Belarusian presidential election. During the protests the erupted during that period he, together with group of protesters submitted a letter to the Grodno Executive Committee (city hall) with steps that should be taken.

In 2021, he left for Lithuania, due to possible punishment by the authorities, and then he left the country to Lithuania. After the jailing of the chairman of the BPF Party, Ryhor Kastusioŭ, from April 12, 2021, he was replaced by Sarančukoŭ. In an interview he gave to Belarusian radio station in Bialystok, Ratsia, he reaffirmed that the party is still active in Belarus.

In August 2024, Sarančukoŭ was sentenced in absentia to four years of imprisonment and a fine for "facilitating extremist activities".
