= BPF Party =

Belarusian political party

BPF Party Партыя БНФ
- Abbreviation: PBNF; ПБНФ
- Leader: Vadzim Sarančukoŭ
- Founder: Zianon Pazniak
- Founded: 30 May 1993; 33 years ago
- Banned: 14 August 2023; 3 years ago
- Preceded by: Belarusian Popular Front "Revival"
- Headquarters: 3-39th Building, Čarnyšeŭskaha St, Minsk
- Newspaper: Пагоня, Svaboda
- Youth wing: BPF Youth
- Membership (2009): 1,819
- Ideology: Belarusian nationalism; Christian democracy; Liberal conservatism; Pro-Europeanism; Anti-communism
- Political position: Centre-right to right-wing
- National affiliation: Belarusian Independence Bloc; United Democratic Forces of Belarus
- European affiliation: European Conservatives and Reformists Party (global partner)
- International affiliation: International Democracy Union
- Colours: Red; White
- Slogan: "Long Live Belarus!" (Belarusian: «Жыве Беларусь!»)

Party flag

Website
- narodny.org

The BPF Party (Note: "BPF" is derived from a translation of its former name, namely the "Belarusian Popular Front", and not the romanization of the Belarusian acronym БНФ (which is romanized "BNF").) (Belarusian: Партыя БНФ, romanized: Partyja BNF; Russian: Партия БНФ, romanized: Partiya BNF) is a banned political party in Belarus. It was de facto established after the split of the social movement Belarusian Popular Front (abbr. BPF; Belarusian: Беларускі Народны Фронт "Адраджэньне", romanized: Bielaruski Narodny Front "Adradžeńnie", БНФ) in 1999. The Belarusian Popular Front was founded during the Perestroika era by members of the Belarusian intelligentsia, including Vasil Bykaŭ. Its first and most charismatic leader was Zianon Pazniak.

After a 2005 decree by president Alexander Lukashenko on the restriction of the usage of the words Беларускі ("Belarusian") and Народны ("National", "Popular", "People's") in the names of political parties and movements, the party had to change its official name to "BPF Party".

== Early history ==
The Belarusian Popular Front was established in 1988 as both a political party and a cultural movement, following the examples of the Popular Front of Estonia, Popular Front of Latvia and the Lithuanian pro-democracy movement Sąjūdis. Membership was declared open to all Belarusian citizens as well as any democratic organization.

Its alleged goals are democracy and independence through national rebirth and rebuilding after the dissolution of the Soviet Union. The main idea of the Front was the revival of the national idea, including a revival of the Belarusian language. Initially, its orientation was pro-Western with a great deal of scepticism towards Russia.

The party was in favour of removing Russian as an official language in Belarus. Russian became an official language following the 1995 Belarusian referendum, at the beginning of Lukashenko's rule, when a proposal for making Russian a state language received 83.3% support from the turnout.

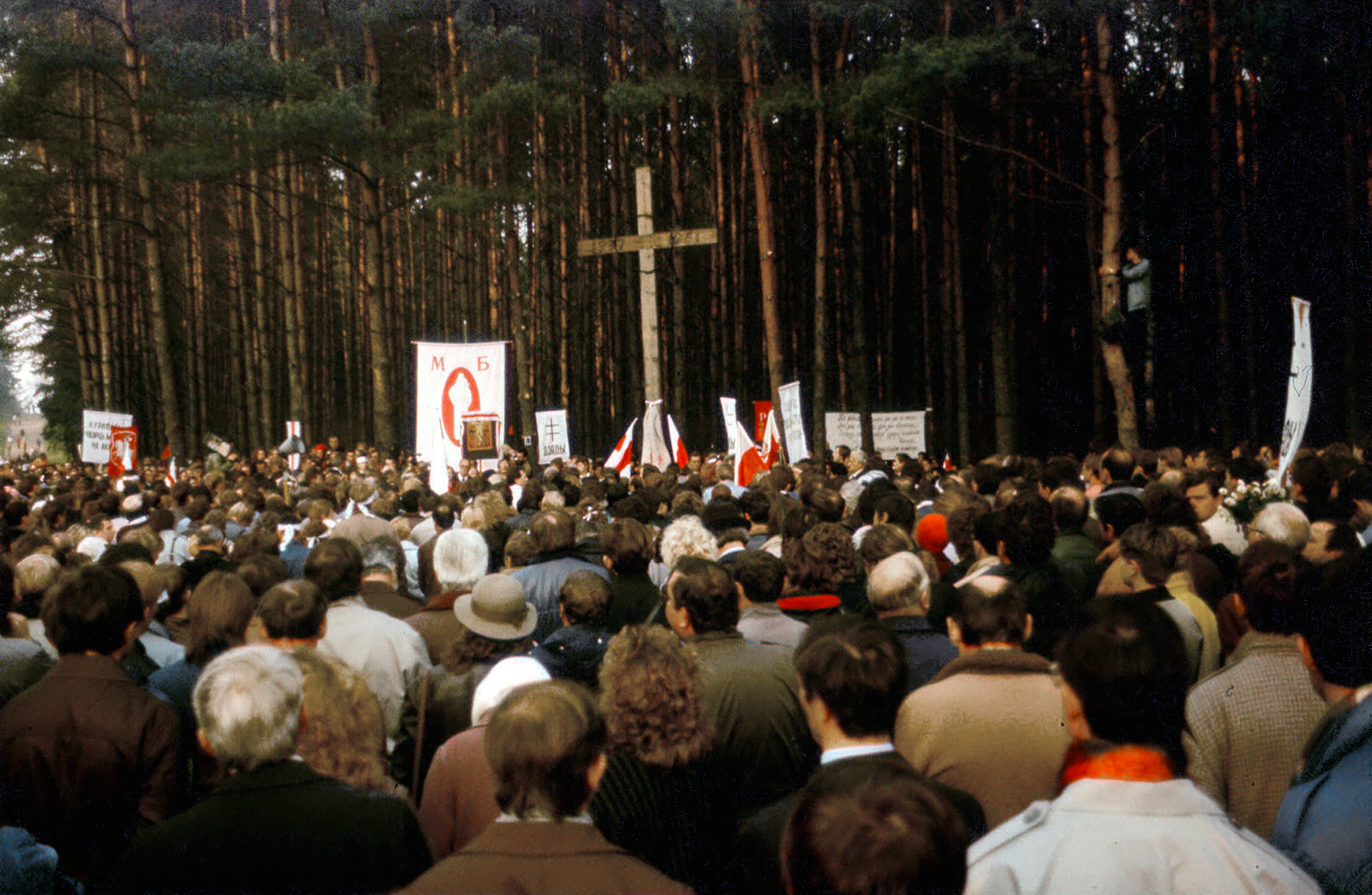
A meeting at Kurapaty in 1989 organized by the Belarusian Popular Front

Among the significant achievements of the Front was the uncovering of the burial site of Kurapaty near Minsk. The Front claims that the NKVD performed extrajudicial killings there.

Initially, the Front had significant visibility because of its numerous public actions that almost always ended in clashes with police and KGB. It was BPF parliamentarians who convinced the Supreme Council of Belarus (the interim Belarusian parliament) to restore the previously used Belarusian symbols: the white-red-white flag and the Pahonia coat of arms, modelled after the Coat of arms of Lithuania. During Soviet-times people faced arrest in the streets for displaying white-red-white symbols in Belarus.

In 1994 the BPF formed a so-called "shadow" cabinet consisting of 100 BPF intellectuals. Its first Prime Minister was Vladimir Zablotsky. It originally contained 18 commissions that published ideas and proposed laws and plans for restructuring the government and economy. Its last economic reform proposal was published in 1999. In opposition to Alexander Lukashenko's government, the party supports Belarus' entry into NATO and the European Union.

== 1999 split ==
Pahonia, the historical Coat of Arms of Belarus

In the late 1990s, the Popular Front split into two parties, both of which claim to be the legitimate continuation of the original BPF. The party's conservative wing under Zianon Pazniak became the Conservative Christian Party – BPF (Belarusian: Кансэрватыўна-Хрысьціянская Партыя - БНФ, romanized: Kanservatyŭna-Chryścijanskaja Partyja BNF) while the moderate majority became today's BPF Party.

== Modern history, participation in elections ==
At the 2004 legislative election the party was part of the People's Coalition 5 Plus (Narodnaja Kaalicyja Piaciorka Plus), which did not secure any seats. These elections fell (according to the OSCE/ODIHR Election Observation Mission) significantly short of OSCE commitments. Universal principles and constitutionally guaranteed rights of expression, association and assembly were seriously violated, calling into question the Belarusian authorities’ willingness to respect the concept of political competition on a basis of equal treatment. According to this mission, the principles of an inclusive democratic process, whereby citizens have the right to seek political office without discrimination, candidates to present their views without obstruction, and voters to learn about them and discuss them freely, were largely ignored.

In October 2005 Alaksandar Milinkievič, a candidate proposed by the BPF and Zialonyja (Belarusian Green Party) was elected the common democratic candidate for the 2006 Presidential election.

During the 2010 presidential election the BPF Party nominated its own candidate for the presidency, Ryhor Kastusiou, who was then the Deputy Chairman of the BPF Party. According to the official results, he gained 1.97% of the votes.

In 2011, following an internal conflict, more than 90 further members left BPF Party, including several prominent veterans of the original Belarusian Popular Front, such as Lyavon Barshchewski, Jury Chadyka, Vincuk Viačorka. This was sometimes described as a "second split" of the Belarusian Popular Front.

In the Congress in September 2017, the new party leader Ryhor Kastusioŭ has been elected. The Congress decided also to nominate Alaksiej Janukievič and Belarusian-American attorney Juraś Ziankovič to the presidential office in the next elections. The final decision about the only candidate has to be made in the future.

On 12 April 2021, Kastusiou was reported to have been arrested by the Belarusian KGB as part of its crackdown on protestors following the results of the 2020 Belarusian presidential election. Officially Kastusiou and BPF members were accused of trying to organise an illegal coup (in which president Alexander Lukashenko was to be assassinated); the Russian FSB together with the KGB have claimed their arrests did prevent the coup to happen. On 5 September 2022, Kastusiou was sentenced to 10 years in jail by the Minsk Regional Court.

On 14 August 2023 the BPF Party was banned by the Supreme Court of Belarus.

=== Presidential elections ===
Election	Candidate	First round		Second round		Result
Election	Candidate	Votes	%	Votes	%	Result
1994	Zianon Pazniak	757,195	12.82%			Lost ✗
1999	Zianon Pazniak	No winner announced				
2001	Endorsed Uładzimir Hančaryk	965,261	15.65%			Lost ✗
2006	Endorsed Alaksandar Milinkievič	405,486	6.12%			Lost ✗
2010	Ryhor Kastusioŭ	126,999	1.97%			Lost ✗
2015	Did not contest					
2020	Alaksiej Janukievich	Not admitted to the elections				

=== Legislative elections ===
Election	Leader	Performance					Rank	Government
Election	Leader	Votes	%	+/–	Seats	+/–	Rank	Government
1995	Zianon Pazniak				0 / 260	New	17th	Extra-parliamentary
2000	Vincuk Viačorka	Did not contest						Extra-parliamentary
2004	Vincuk Viačorka	200,033	3.33%	New	0 / 110	0	▲5th	Extra-parliamentary
2008	Lyavon Barshchewski	72,770	1.35%	▼1.98	0 / 110	0	5th	Extra-parliamentary
2012	Alaksiej Janukievich	2,789	0.05%	▼1.30	0 / 110	0	▼8th	Extra-parliamentary
2016	Alaksiej Janukievich	88,511	1.72%	▲1.67	0 / 110	0	▲6th	Extra-parliamentary
2019	Ryhor Kastusioŭ	82,403	1.56%	▼0.16	0 / 110	0	▼7th	Extra-parliamentary

== International relations ==
The party became an associate member of the International Democracy Union in 2007.

It was an observer member of the European People's Party until 2017. Since 7 April 2017 the party is a member of the Alliance of Conservatives and Reformists in Europe. Its youth wing, BPF Youth, is a member of the European Young Conservatives.

== Chairman ==
- 2021–Current Vadzim Sarančukoŭ
- 2017–2021: Ryhor Kastusioŭ
- 2009–2017: Alaksiej Janukievich
- 2007–2009: Lyavon Barshchewski
- 1999–2007: Vincuk Viačorka

== See also ==
- Rada of the Belarusian Democratic Republic - the Belarusian government in exile
- Conservative Christian Party – BPF
