= Church of Saint Andrew the Apostle, Kryvichy =

Coordinates: 54°42′26″N 27°17′31″E

Church of Saint Andrew the Apostle
- Крывіцкі касцёл Святога апостала Андрэя і кляштар трынітарыяў
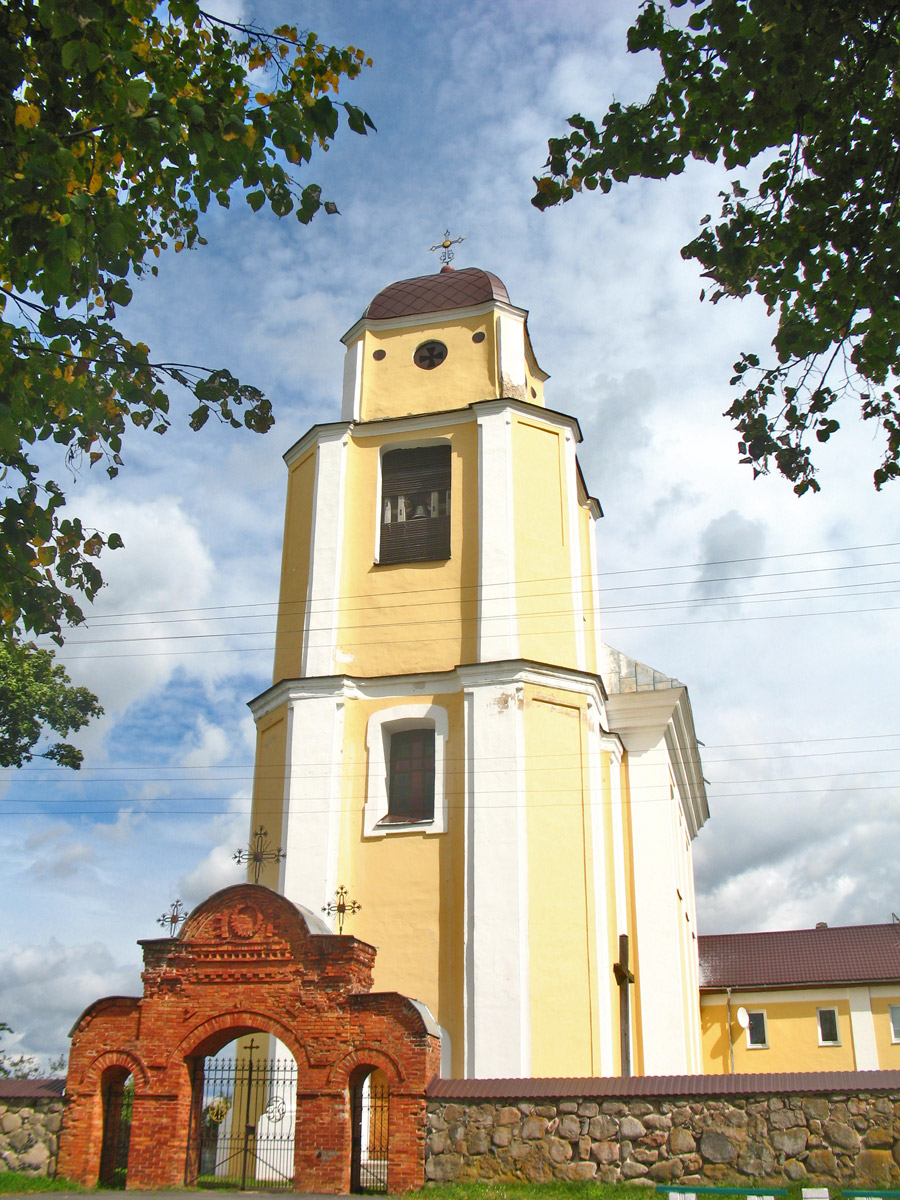
- Church of Saint Andrew the Apostle
- Location: Kryvichy
- Country: Belarus
- Denomination: Roman Catholic church
- Religious institute: Trinitarians

History
- Status: Active

Architecture
- Style: Baroque
- Years built: 1776—1796

Administration
- Diocese: Roman Catholic Archdiocese of Minsk–Mohilev

The Church of Saint Andrew the Apostle is a Catholic church in Kryvichy, Myadzyel District, Belarus, built in 1776–1796 in Baroque style.

== History ==
The church was established in 1770 as a part of the Trinitarians' monastery. The first wooden church was replaced by a stone one in 1796. In the same year the church was consecrated in the name of Andrew the Apostle by the bishop Troksky. The monastery operated until 1830, when it was closed by the authorities in the aftermath of the November Uprising. When the monastery was suppressed, all its buildings were given to the parish.

== Architecture ==
The church is a one-naved basilica with a square apse and a high three-storey bell tower at the main front and an adjacent two-storey dormitory on the southeast side. The nave is covered with a cylindrical vault. The main altar dominates the Baroque interior. Its wooden statue of Christ is a copy of the one in Antakalnis. Adam Kirkor wrote in 1855 that both statues were brought from Rome.

== Gallery ==
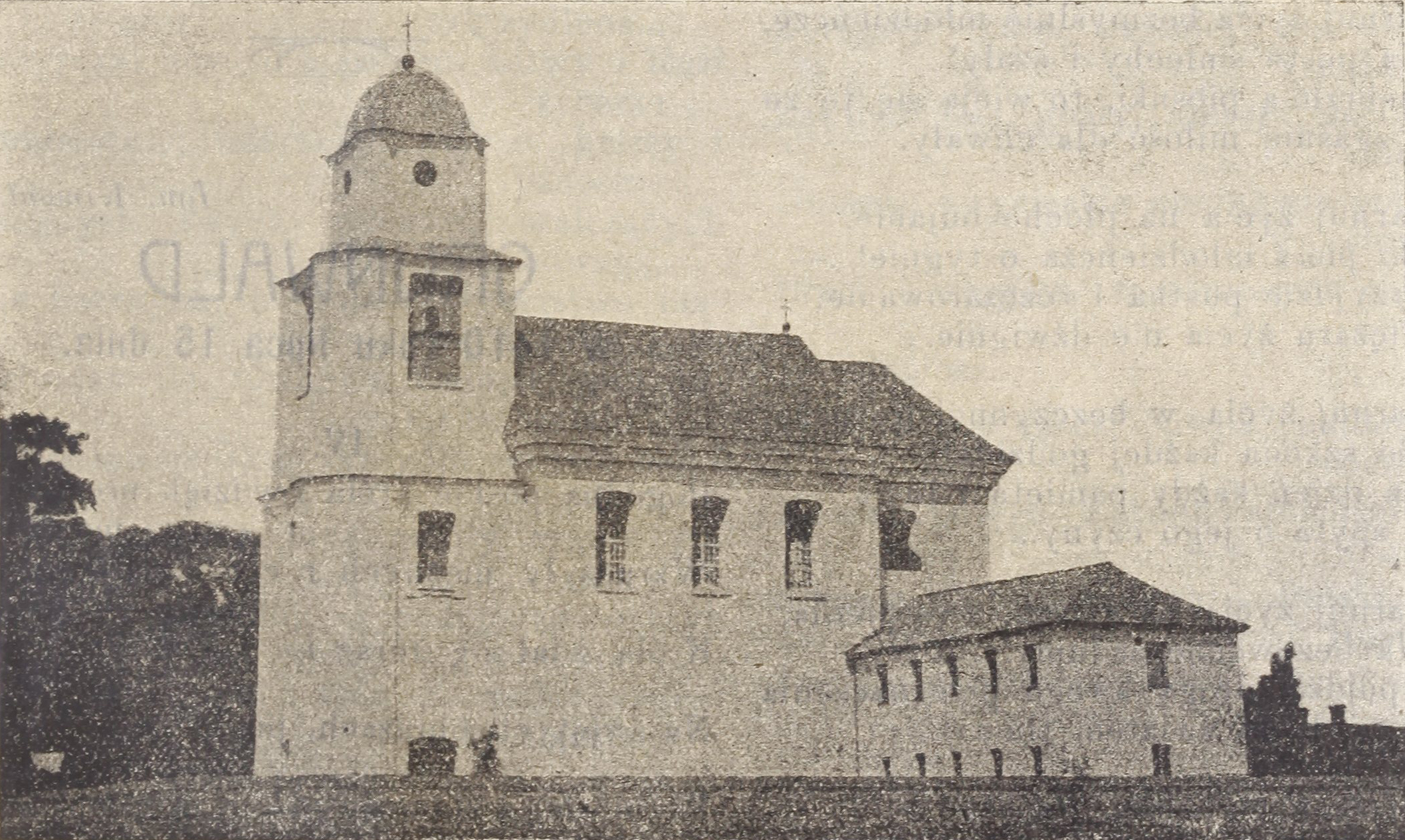
Before September 1910

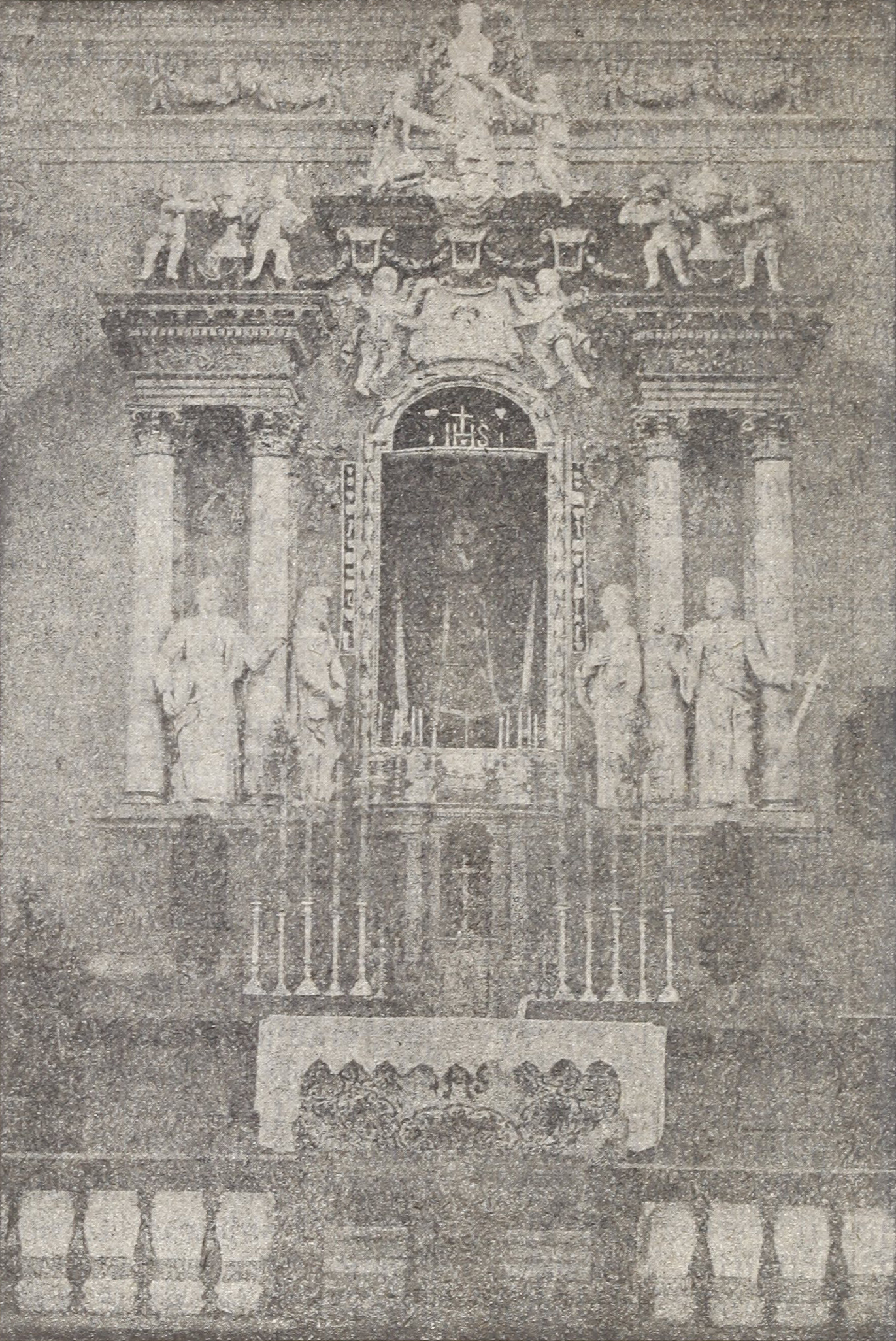
The main altar before 1910

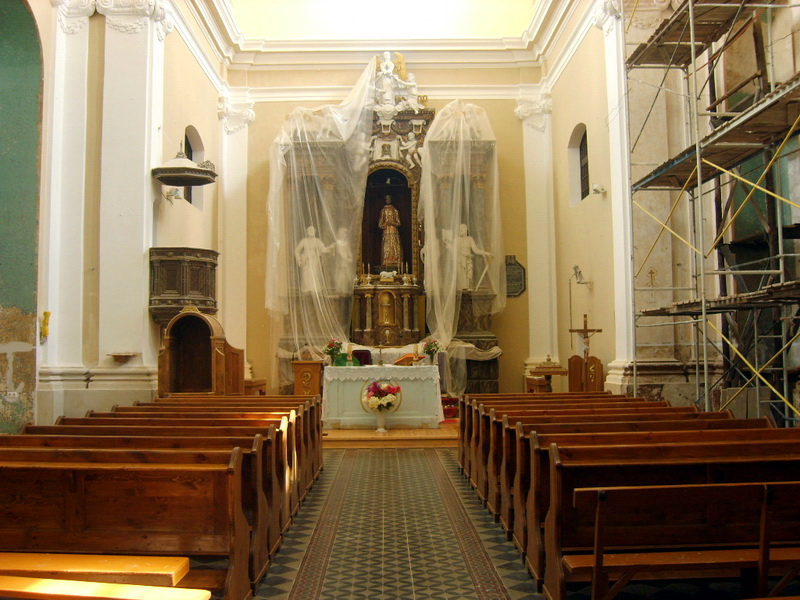
The interior during reconstruction, 2010

== Sources ==
- Дзяржаўны спіс гісторыка-культурных каштоўнасцей Рэспублікі Беларусь: Даведнік ed. V.Y. Ablamski, I.M. Charnyavski, Y.A. Barysyuk. Minsk: BELTA 2009, ISBN 978-985-6828-35-8
- Каталіцкія храмы Беларусі: Энцыкл. даведнік. А.М. Kulagin, photographs by A.L. Dibovski. Minsk: BELTA 2008 (2nd edn.), ISBN 978-985-11-0395-5
- Каталіцкія святыні. Мінска-Магілёўская архідыяцэзія. Ч. 1. Будслаўскі, Вілейскі і Мінскі дэканаты. А. Yaromenki with introduction by Ul. Trotsevskii. Minsk: VUP "Pro Christ", 2003, ISBN 985-6628-37-7
- Наследие архитектуры Беларуси. Монастыри восточной и заадной традиций. I.N. Slyunkova. Moscow: Progress-Traditsiya, 2002
- Мураваныя харалы: Сакральная архітэктура беларускага барока. T.V. Habrus. Minsk: Urajai, 2001, ISBN 985-04-0499-X
