= Paval Sieviaryniec =

Belarusian journalist, youth leader, and pro-democracy activist

- Павал Севярынец
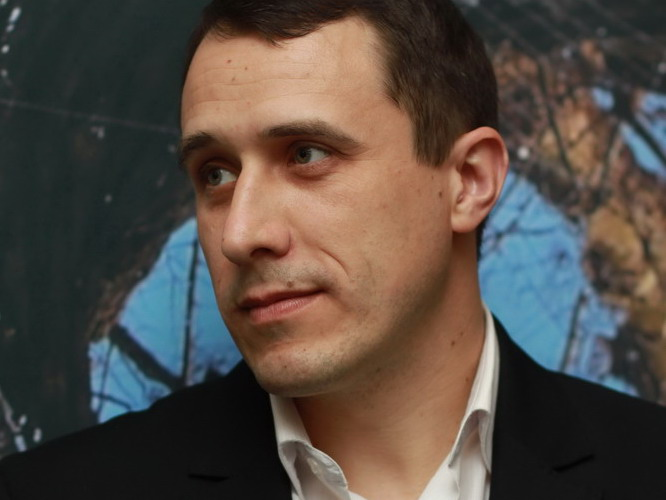
- Born: 30 December 1976 (age 49); Orsha, Byelorussian SSR, Soviet Union
- Organization: Belarusian Christian Democracy
- Known for: dissident, prisoner of conscience, writer
- Awards: Belarusian Democratic Republic 100th Jubilee Medal (2018)

Paval Kastancinavič Sieviaryniec (Belarusian: Павал Канстанцінавіч Севярынец, born December 30, 1976) is a Belarusian journalist and Christian democratic politician and youth leader and one of the founders of the Young Front.

== Biography ==
Paval Sieviaryniec was born in Orsha, Vitebsk Region into a family of a journalist Kastuś Sieviaryniec and a school teacher Tacciana Sieviaryniec. In 1994, he graduated from school with a gold medal. In 2000 he graduated from the Geography faculty of the Belarusian State University.

From 1994 till 1999 he worked as journalist for several state and commercial newspapers. Since 1998 Paval Sieviaryniec became known for his essays and his work as a publicist.

=== Political activity ===
In 1995, Paval Sieviaryniec joined the Belarusian Popular Front "Adradžeńnie". In February 1997, he became leader of the Minsk youth fraction of the organization. In September 1997, he was elected the Young Front co-chair at the Constituent Assembly.

In 1997-2004 Sieviaryniec became known as leader of mass youth protests against policy of the president Lukashenko.

Within the framework of his activities in the Young Front Paval Sieviaryniec initiated many educational projects as well as projects promoting Belarusian language, democratic values and the idea of European integration of Belarus.

In 1999-2003, Paval Sieviaryniec was he Deputy Chairman of the BPF Party. From 1994 to 2004 he was also chairman of the Young Front. Sieviaryniec was one of the organizers of the I Belarusian Youth Congress (July 2001), Kurapaty defense (September 2001 – June 2002), national campaign "European Belarus" (spring 2002), pre-election block "Young Belarus" (2004).

=== First imprisonment ===
In 2005, Paval Sieviaryniec was accused of organizing protest actions against Alexander Lukashenko’s running for a third presidential term that took place in Minsk after 2004 controversial referendum. He was sentenced to three years of correctional labor and served his sentence involved in logging in Maloje Sitna village in the north of Belarus (Polack District).

The U.S. protested the sentence, calling it a "parody of justice", and the European Union stated that "even by the standards of Belarus, this is an excessive penalty". In 2006, international organization Amnesty International designated him a prisoner of conscience. Taking into account amnesty, the term was shortened to 2 years. Sieviaryniec was released in 2007. In captivity he wrote a book "Letters from the forest" ("Лісты зь лесу"). According to Nasha Niva survey, it was considered 2007 best Belarusian book.

Sieviaryniec faced a new series of charges in 2007. In July, a court found him and fellow activist Aleksey Shein guilty of "distributing illegal literature" after they were found leaflets for a political meeting. On 19 August, Sevyarynets was arrested with other youth activists during a Brest book reading at which he discussed his three books. The group were detained for "participating in an unsanctioned meeting" and were also accused of possessing counterfeit money and Ukrainian liquor.

=== BCD activity ===
Sieviaryniec later became a co-leader of the Belarusian Christian Democracy party. In December 2010, he was arrested again on charges related to protests against Lukashenko's disputed re-election. On 16 May 2011, he was sentenced to three years' imprisonment. Amnesty International designated him a prisoner of conscience. He was released from detention on 19 October 2013.

=== Second imprisonment ===
Paval Sieviaryniec was detained during Ploscha night protests on 20 December 2010 and convicted in organizing and preparing activities that seriously disrupt public order, or participating in them. Later he was sentenced to 3 years of imprisonment, he was named a prisoner of conscience by Amnesty International. Released from detention on 19 November 2013. In captivity he wrote an essay book "Belarusian depth" ("Беларуская глыбіня").

=== Later activity and third imprisonment ===
Paval Sieviaryniec worked on re-foundation of the Belarusian Christian-democratic party, and is co-chairman of its organizational committee.

On June 7, 2020 Sieviaryniec was arrested for his participation in earlier protests and sentenced to 75 days “administrative arrest”. Since then he has been unable to meet with his lawyer and has partly been in solitary confinement. In addition, his bible has been taken away from him. Amnesty International considered him a prisoner of conscience. On May 25, 2021, a Mogilev court sentenced him to seven years in prison on charges of organizing mass unrest. On December 13, 2025, Sieviaryniec was released along with 122 other political prisoners.

On December 13, 2025, Sieviaryniec was released along with 122 other political prisoners and expelled from Belarus to Ukraine. Soon after, Sieviaryniec arrived in Lithuania.

== Attitude towards homosexuality ==
He has been very vocal against adaption of LGBT acceptance in Belarus. On June 4, 2016, Sieviaryniec gave an interview to Radio Free Europe stating that homosexuality as a social norm will destroy the Belarusian nation, the very idea of gender is just as dangerous as racist propaganda or provoking class warfare and that gay Belarusians dishonor the memory of those died fighting against the USSR and Nazi Germany. In this interview he said:

"Everyone has the right to behave as he sees fit. But this cannot be imposed as a social norm. It is simply impossible. It will end with the destruction of the nation, the society."

Make Out, a Belarusian group that describes itself as a feminist anti-discriminatory project launched by the Belarusian PEN Center in 2014, denounced that Sieviaryniec was "one of the first people who stated that gays should be 'treated', and that "gender is an ideology". Furthermore, when Sieviaryniec found out about PEN's support of Make Out, he stopped paying dues alleging that centre was "promoting a sexual lifestyle".

On 29 October 2019 he was expelled from the Belarusian PEN Center because of his homophobia, as he had supported in that year a petition from an anti-gender movement to make the government pass a law to criminalise LGBTI 'propaganda'. A summary of his statements was published on the site of the Belarusian PEN Center on October 30, 2019,

After being expelled from the Belarusian PEN Center Sieviaryniec penned an open letter, claiming that a leftist group of "cultural marxists" and "LGBTI propagandists" had gathered in the leadership of the PEN centre and prosecutes Christians.

=== Writing ===
Paval Sieviaryniec is a member of the Belarusian Writers' Union, and is working on his three-volume novel Belarusalim (vol. 2 Heart of the Light is to be published in 2020), Belarusian Association of Journalists, Belarusian Language Society, World Association of Belarusians "Baćkaŭščyna".

== Sakharov Prize nomination ==
Upon being jointly nominated by the European People's Party, the Socialists and Democrats and Renew Europe for the Sakharov Prize for his democratic opposition in Belarus, news surfaced that Sieviaryniec had promoted homophobic policies in the country. Support from the three European nominating parties was soon dropped off, given that the purpose of prize to recognise people who defend human rights and fundamental freedoms.

== Bibliography ==
- "Ды-джэі Адраджэньня" (Deejays of national rebirth, 1998)
- "Пакаленьне Маладога Фронту" (Generation of the Malady Front, 2002)
- "Нацыянальная ідэя" (National idea, 2005)
- "Лісты зь лесу" (Letters from the forest, 2007)
- "Брату" (To the brother, 2007).
- "Беларуская глыбіня" (Belarusian depth, 2015)
- "Беларуская Хрысціянская Дэмакратыя" (Belarusian Christian Democracy 1917 - 2017, 2017)
- "Сто асобаў беларускай хрысціянскай дэмакратыі" ( One hundred persons in Belarusian Christian democracy, 2017)
- "Беларусалім. Золак" (Belarusalim. The Dawn, 2017)
- "Беларусь — гэта святое" (Belarus — is sacred, 2026)

== Awards ==
Paval Sieviaryniec is a laureate of the Ales Adamovich literature prize of the Belarusian PEN Centre, Francišak Aliachnovič Award, Vasiľ Bykaŭ "For Freedom of Thought" Award.

== Personal life ==
On 11 January 2014 married Volha Šylak. They have a son Francišak (born 2018).

== See also ==
- Belarusian Christian Democracy
- Young Front
- BPF Party
