= Edvard Zaikouski =

Belarusian archaeologist (1952–2025)

- Эдвард Зайкоўскі
- Born: Edvard Zaikouski; 18 November 1952; Dubašy, Gomel Oblast, Byelorussian SSR, USSR
- Died: 22 July 2025 (aged 72); Minsk, Belarus
- Education: Belarusian State University
- Scientific career
- Fields: Archaeology

Edvard Mikhailavich Zaikouski (Belarusian: Эдвард Міхайлавіч Зайкоўскі; 18 November 1952 – 22 July 2025) was a Belarusian archaeologist.

== Life and career ==
Zaikouski was born in village of Dubashi, Volozhyn district. He graduated from Belarusian State University in 1975. In 1979–1984, he participated in the youth public association "Belarusian Master's Workshop". From 1980, he worked at the Institute of History of the National Academy of Sciences of Belarus.

He was the author of a number of publications, including "Primitive Monuments of Northern Belarus" (1990) and "Ancient Belarusian Cuisine" (1995).

Zaikouski died on 22 July 2025, at the age of 72.
