= Kryvichy, Myadzyel district =

Urban-type settlement in Minsk Region, Belarus

Kryvichy Крывічы (Belarusian) Кривичи (Russian)
- Urban-type settlement
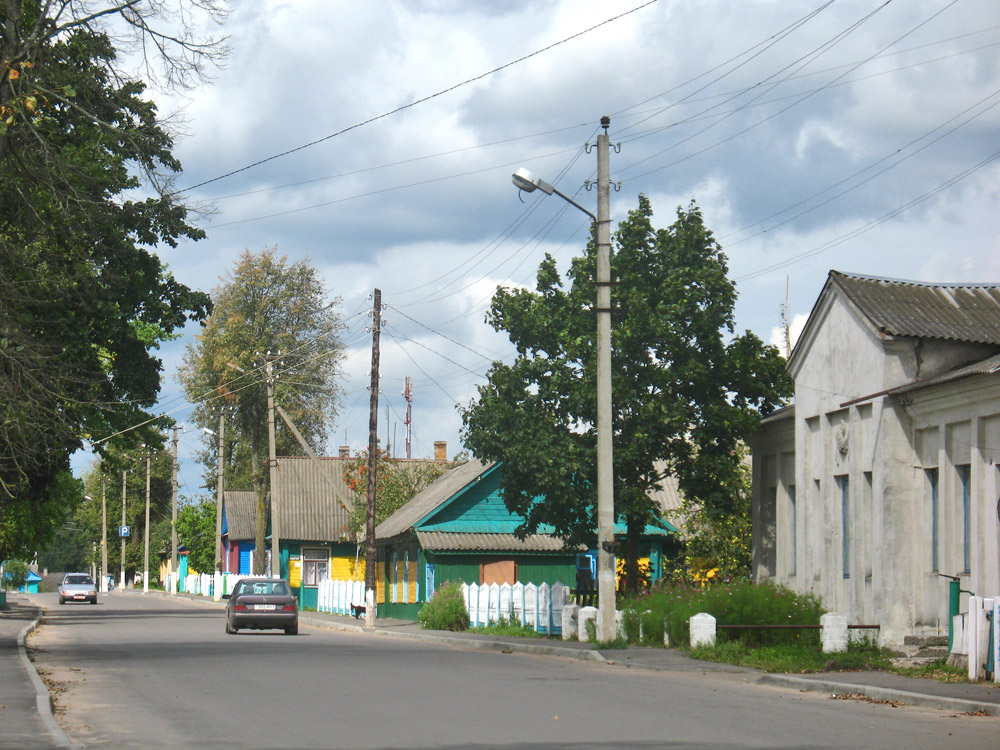

- Location within Belarus
- Coordinates: 54°42′39″N 27°17′00″E
- Country: Belarus
- Region: Minsk Region
- District: Myadzyel District

Population (2026)
  - Total: 1,003
- Time zone: UTC+3 (MSK)

Kryvichy (Belarusian: Крывічы, romanized: Kryvičy; Russian: Кривичи́, romanized: Krivichi) is an urban-type settlement in Myadzyel District, Minsk Region, Belarus. It is located 39 kilometres (24 mi) from Myadzyel. In 2011, it had a population of 1,266. As of 2026, it has a population of 1,003.

== See also ==
- Church of Saint Andrew the Apostle, Kryvichy
