= Vladimir Kulakov (politician, 1936–2022) =

Soviet-Belarusian politician

Chairman of the Vitebsk Regional Executive Committee
- In office 24 December 1984 – 17 November 1994
- Preceded by: Ivan Shibeko
- Succeeded by: Vladimir Andreichenko

Personal details
- Born: Vladimir Panteleyevich Kulakov; 12 October 1936 Zharkovsky District, Kalinin Oblast, Russian SFSR, USSR
- Died: 24 October 2022 (aged 86)
- Party: CPSU
- Education: Belarus State Economic University; Grodno State Agrarian University

Vladimir Panteleyevich Kulakov (Russian: Влади́мир Пантеле́евич Кулако́в, Belarusian: Уладзімір Панцялеевіч Кулакоў; 12 October 1936 – 24 October 2022) was a Soviet-Belarusian politician. A member of the Communist Party, he served as chairman of the Vitebsk Regional Executive Committee from 1984 to 1994.

Kulakov died on 24 October 2022, at the age of 86.
