= Aleksandr Sloboda =

Belarusian politician (1920–2022)

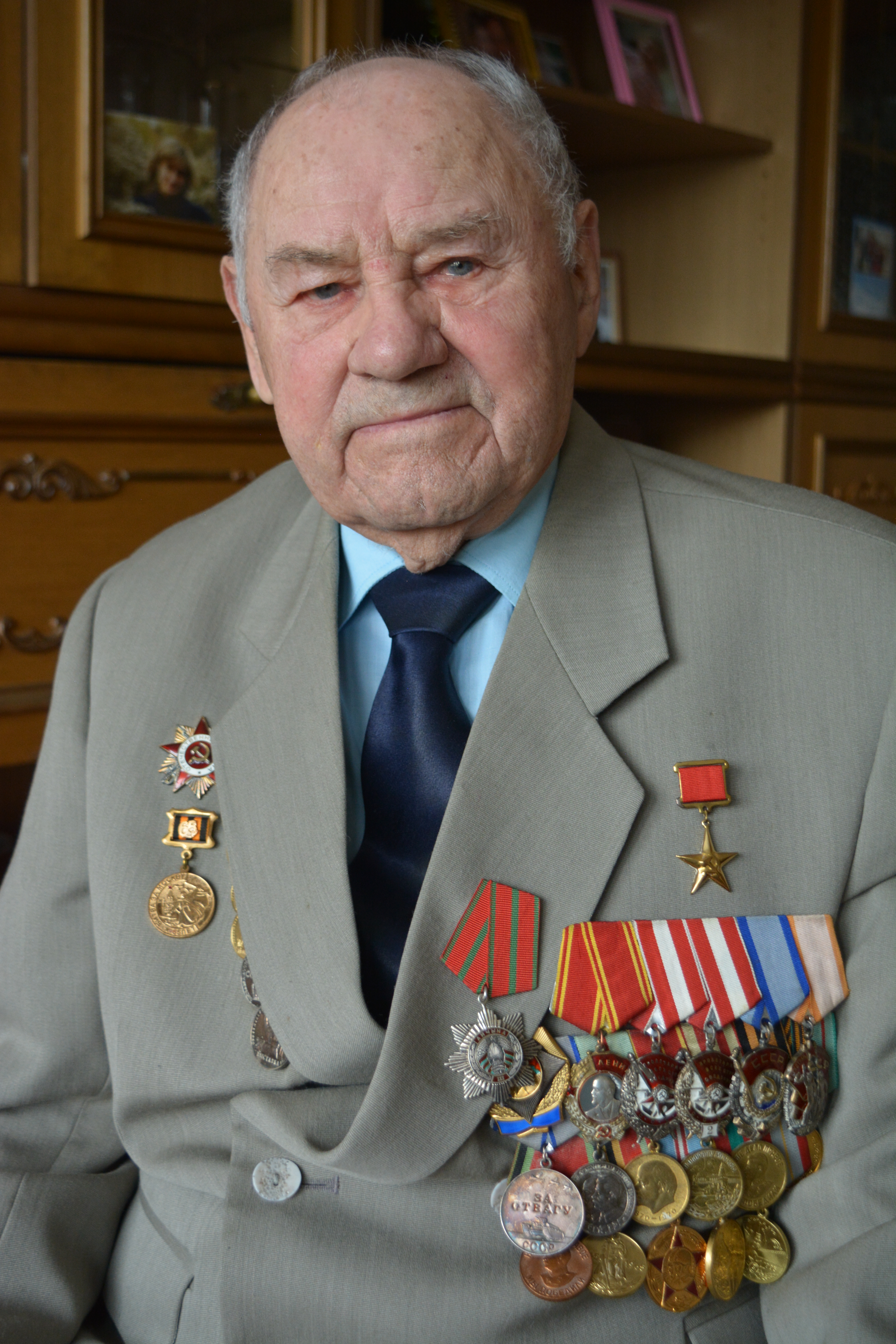
- Sloboda in 2016

Member of the Supreme Council of Belarus
- In office 1991–1994

Member of the Supreme Soviet of the Byelorussian Soviet Socialist Republic
- In office 1963–1967

Personal details
- Born: Aleksandr Ivanovich Sloboda; 27 August 1920 Dubrovy, Vyerkhnyadzvinsk district, Vitebsk region, Byelorussian SSR
- Died: 14 November 2022 (aged 102)
- Party: CPSU
- Education: Higher Party School at the Central Committee of the CPSU

Aleksandr Ivanovich Sloboda (Belarusian: Аляксандр Іванавіч Слабада; 27 August 1920 – 14 November 2022) was a Belarusian politician. A member of the Communist Party of the Soviet Union, he served on the Supreme Council of Belarus from 1991 to 1994.

Sloboda died on 14 November 2022, at the age of 102.
