= Jörg Dornau =

German politician

Member of the Landtag of Saxony
- Incumbent
- Assumed office 2019

Personal details
- Born: 1970 (age 55–56) Borna, Leipzig, East Germany (now Saxony, Germany)
- Party: Alternative for Germany

Jörg Dornau is a German politician and member of the far-right Alternative for Germany party who has served in the Landtag of Saxony since 2019.

== Biography ==
Born in 1970 in Borna, Leipzig, East Germany, Jörg Dornau was elected to the Landtag of Saxony in 2019 as a member of the Alternative for Germany. In September 2024, Belarusian news reported that Dornau owned an onion plantation in the country that signed a contract to use political prisoners as labor. He allegedly visited the plantation at least once to see the operation. In 2025, Tsybulka-Bel, the company in question, was added to the sanctions list of the EU.
