= Heorhij Halenčanka =

Belarusian historian and medievalist (1937–2026)

- Георгій Галенчанка
- Born: 28 February 1937; Petrozavodsk, Karelian ASSR, Russian SFSR, Soviet Union
- Died: 9 March 2026 (aged 89); Minsk, Belarus
- Education: Belarusian State University; Moscow State Institute for History and Archives
- Awards: State Prize of the Republic of Belarus (1994)
- Scientific career
- Fields: History; medieval studies; bibliology; Skaryna studies
- Workplaces: Institute of History of the NASB; Belarusian State University

Heorhij Yakaŭlevič Halenčanka (Belarusian: Георгій Якаўлевіч Галенчанка) or Georgy Yakovlevich Golenchenko (Russian: Георгий Яковлевич Голенченко; 28 February 1937 – 9 March 2026) was a Belarusian historian, medievalist, bibliologist, and expert in Skaryna studies. He was a Doctor of Historical Sciences (1965).

== Life and career ==
Heorhij Halenchanka was born in Petrozavodsk on 28 February 1937, in a Ukrainian-Jewish family, but spent most of his childhood in Minsk.

Halenčanka graduated from the Faculty of History of the Belarusian State University (BSU) in 1960. From 1960 to 1962, he worked as a librarian at the State Library of the BSSR.

In 1965, he completed his postgraduate studies at the Moscow State Institute for History and Archives.

From 1965 to 1968, he worked as a senior lecturer at the Belarusian State University.

From 1968, he worked at the Institute of History of the Academy of Sciences of the BSSR as a senior researcher in the Department of the History of Belarus of the Pre-Soviet Period. From 1991 to 2005, he served as the Head of the Department of Special Historical Sciences at the Institute of History of the National Academy of Sciences of Belarus. Until August 2020, he was a Chief Researcher in the Department of the History of Belarus of the Middle Ages and the Early Modern Period.

He lectured at the European Humanities University, the National Institute for Higher Education, and Poznań University.

Halenčanka died on 9 March 2026, at the age of 89.

== Scientific activity ==
His research interests focused on the history of Belarusian book printing in the 16–18th centuries.

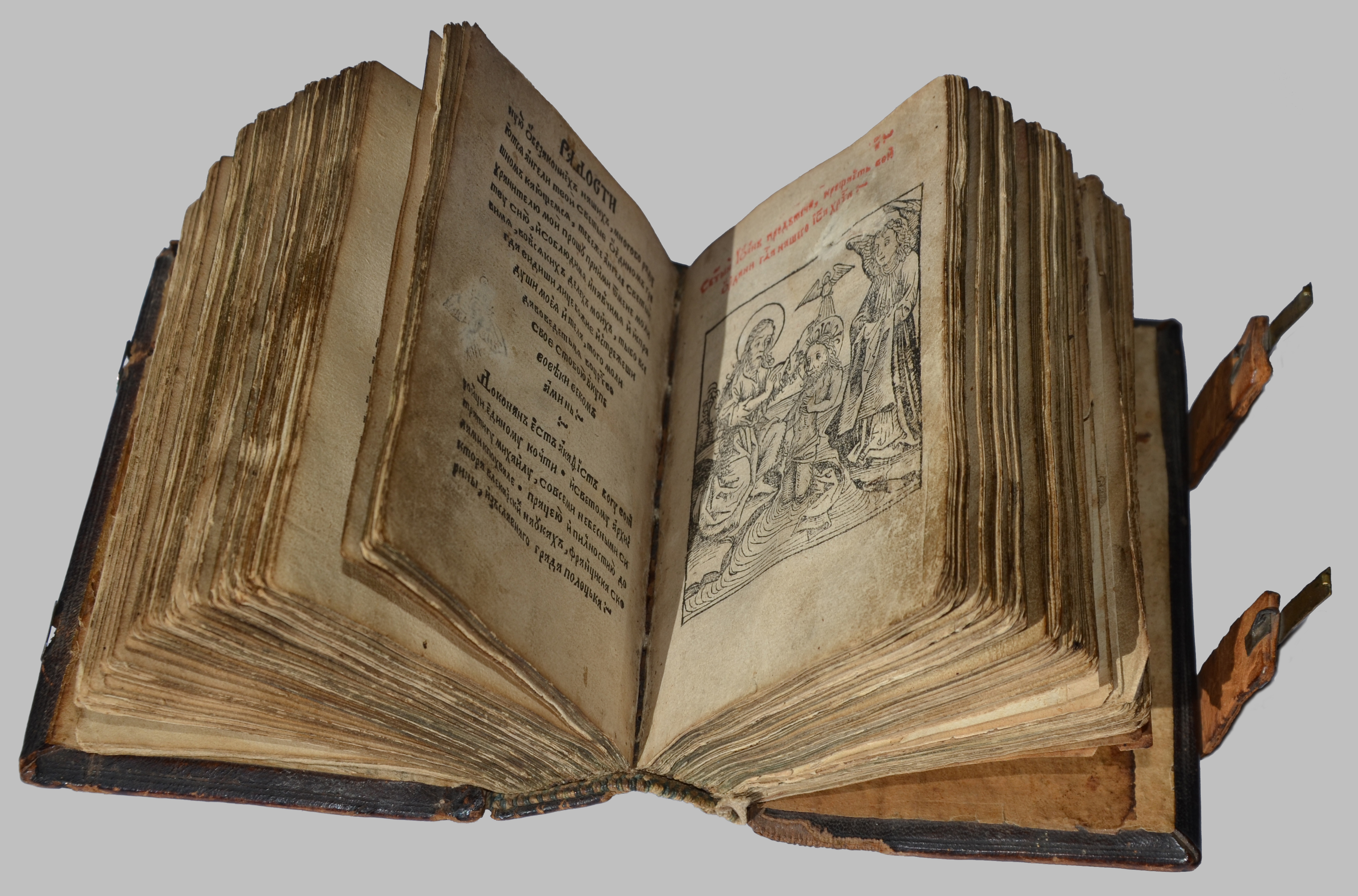
The Little Traveller's Book (Ruthenian: Малая подорожная книжка), printed in Vilnius, in 1522

He was the author of studies on the Little Travelller's Book by Francysk Skaryna. He is one of the authors of the popular science book "Francysk Skaryna", published by UNESCO (Paris, 1979–1980; in French and English). He compiled the section "Old Printed Cyrillic Editions of the 16th–18th Centuries" in the catalog "The Book of Belarus. 1517–1917" (1986) and the facsimile edition of Skaryna's "Bible" (1990–1991, in 3 volumes). He is the author of the books "Ideological and Cultural Connections of East Slavic Peoples in the 16th – Mid-17th Century" (1989) and "Francysk Skaryna – Belarusian and East Slavic First Printer" (1993).

== Selected works ==
- Галенчанка Г. Я. (1994). Вадзяныя знакі [Watermarks]. Энцыклапедыя гісторыі Беларусі [Encyclopedia of the History of Belarus] (in Belarusian). Vol. 2. Мінск: БелЭн. p. 179. ISBN 5-85700-142-0.
- Пашкоў, Г. П.; et al., eds. (2001). Асветнікі зямлі Беларускай. Х — пачатак ХХ ст.: Энцыклапедычны даведнік [Educators of the Belarusian Land. 10th – Early 20th Century: Encyclopedic Reference] (in Belarusian). Мінск: Беларуская энцыклапедыя. p. 492. ISBN 985-11-0205-9.

== Awards ==
- State Prize of the Republic of Belarus (1994, as part of a collective) – for the cycle of works "Skaryna and Belarusian Culture".
