= Eduard Vaytsyakhovich =

Belarusian politician (1960–2022)

Member of the Supreme Council of Belarus
- In office 9 January 1996 – 27 November 1996

Personal details
- Born: Eduard Antonavich Vaytsyakhovich; 3 April 1960 Kamarova, Myadzyel District, Byelorussian SSR, Soviet Union
- Died: 12 January 2022 (aged 61) Kamarova, Myadzyel District, Belarus
- Party: UCP

Eduard Antonavich Vaytsyakhovich (Belarusian: Эдуард Антонавіч Вайцяховіч; 3 April 1960 – 12 January 2022) was a Belarusian politician. A member of the United Civic Party, he served in the Supreme Council of Belarus from 9 January to 27 November 1996. He died in Kamarova on 12 January 2022, at the age of 61.
