= Ryhor Kastusioŭ =

Belarusian politician

- Григорий Андреевич Костусёв; Рыгор Андрэевіч Кастусёў
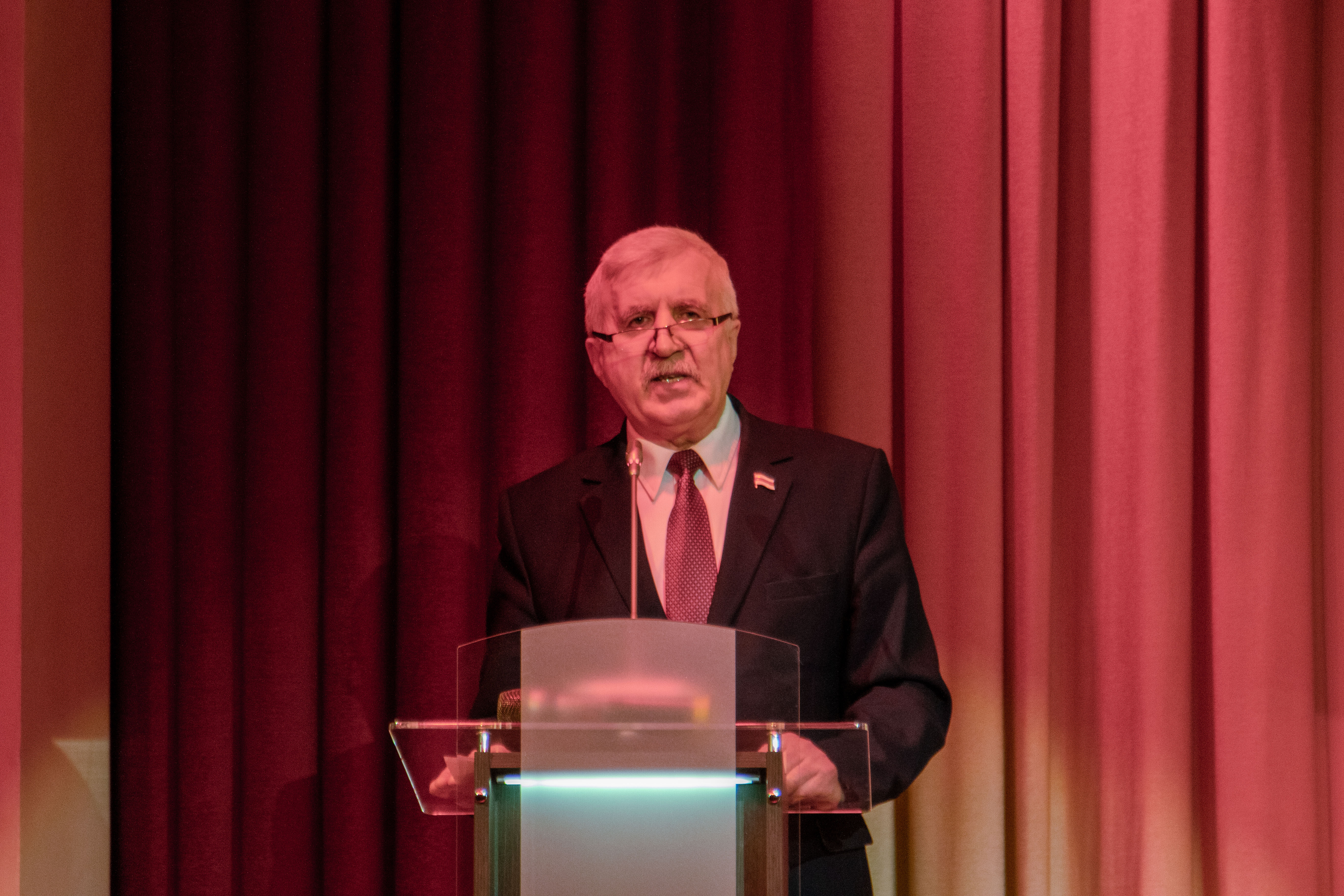
- Kastusiou in 2021

Chairman of the Belarusian People's Front
- In office 30 September 2017 – 12 April 2022
- Preceded by: Alaksiej Janukievich
- Succeeded by: Vadzim Sarančukoŭ

Personal details
- Born: 17 April 1957 (age 69) Tekhtin, Byelorussian SSR
- Education: Belarusian Agricultural Academy
- Occupation: Politician

Ryhor Andreyevič Kastusioŭ (Belarusian: Рыгор Андрэевіч Кастусёў; Russian: Григорий Андреевич Костусёв; born 17 April 1957) is a Belarusian politician, head of the Mogilev regional Coalition of Democratic Forces. He was chairman of the Belarusian Popular Front from 30 September 2017 until 12 April 2022.

== Biography ==
After graduating from the Tekhtin secondary school, in 1974 he became a member of the Drut state farm. After completing his military service (1975-1977) in the Soviet Armed Forces and training at the Belarusian Agricultural Academy (1977-1982) he returned to his state farm as the head of the workshop, and since 1983 he became the chief engineer. In 1988 he was elected director of the Iskra state farm. In 1991, he moved to work in Shklov, first as the chief mechanic of MPMK-283, and from 1995 to 2001 he held the position of director of the Shklov district production association of housing and communal services. He left the post under pressure from the authorities, who accused him of supporting the opposition during the 2001 presidential election. From 2002 to 2004 he was the director of the joint Belarusian-Ukrainian enterprise "Hydrosila - Belaya Rus". Then the enterprise was closed. In 2005, he became the commercial director of a private enterprise in Mogilev. As a private entrepreneur, he was registered in 2004, in 2008 he stopped doing business. Since the same year, he has been an employee of StroyArkom LLC (St. Petersburg). Since 1989, he has been actively involved in the public and political life of Belarus. He joined the Belarusian People's Front party, in 1993 he was elected the head of the Shklov regional organization of the Belarusian Popular Front, since 1996 he became a member of the Council of the Belarusian Popular Front. From 2002 to 2003 he was the chairman of the Mogilev regional organization of the Belarusian Popular Front, and since 2009 he has been the deputy head of the Belarusian Popular Front and NGO "Vozrozhdenie". In 2008, he was elected chairman of the Mogilev Regional Coalition of Democratic Forces.

During the presidential elections of 2006, he was a confidant of the single presidential candidate from the United Democratic Forces of Belarus, since 2008 he headed the Mogilev regional branch of the United Democratic Forces.

Three times (in 1987, 1991 and 1995) Kastusiou was elected a deputy of local councils. In 2004 and 2008, in the elections to the parliament of Belarus, he was a candidate for deputy from the Shklov constituency. During the 2006 presidential campaign, he was a confidant of Alaksandar Milinkievič. In the 2010 presidential election, he collected 109 thousand signatures and became one of the candidates. On the night of December 19–20, he and several other candidates (Nikolai Statkevich and Andrei Sannikov) were detained for organizing and participating in protests against electoral fraud. Kostusev became the only candidate who managed to challenge the results of the elections to the CEC, since the candidate had to file a complaint personally, which other candidates could not do while in jail. At the congress of the Belarusian Popular Front Party on October 3, 2017, he was elected head of the party.

On April 12, 2021, he was detained by the KGB of Belarus at his home in the city of Shklov, Mogilev Region and placed in a pre-trial detention center in the capital Minsk. Kastusiou, Alyaksandr Feduta and Yuras Zyankovich were accused of attempting a military coup. On September 5, 2022, the Minsk District Court sentenced Rygor Kastusiou to 10 years in prison. In December 2021, Human rights organisation Viasna recognized Kastusioŭ as a political prisoner. On July 3, 2024, Ryhor Kastusioŭ was released.
