= Blanda (city) =

Coordinates: 39.9667°N 15.8000°E

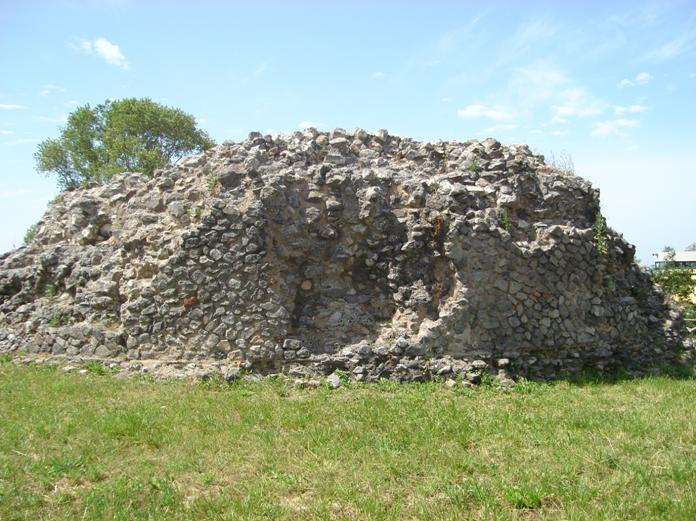
Roman Mausoleum at Pergolo

Blanda (Greek: Βλάνδα), and later Blanda Julia, was an ancient city of Lucania now located at Palecastro di Tortora, Province of Cosenza, Italy.

It was mentioned by Ptolemy among the inland towns of that province; but placed both by Pliny and Mela on or near the coast of the Tyrrhenian Sea. The former writer includes it in Bruttium, but this seems to be a mistake: Livy, who mentions Blanda among the towns which had revolted to the Carthaginians, but were recovered by Fabius in 214 BCE, expressly calls it a Lucanian city. (Liv. xiv. 20; Plin. iii. 5. s. 10; Mel. ii. 4; Ptol. iii. 1. § 70.) The Tabula Peutingeriana also places it on the road along the coast of Lucania.

== History ==
In the mid-6th century BC the Oenotrians began their colonisation of the coast, probably coming from Vallo di Diano. Their presence in the area was ascertained by the discovery of 38 tombs with Oenotrian funerary objects, by a lithic stele, as well as by the original nucleus of the town.

In the middle of the following century the settlement was abandoned, perhaps due to an earthquake. In the 4th century BC the Palècastro hill was occupied by the Lucanians who rebuilt the village, fortifying it with a city wall when it took the name of Blanda. A necropolis was established in the area between San Brancato and Palècastro itself. The Lucanian town left a large quantity of ceramic materials, today exhibited at the archaeological exhibition of Tortora.

The Lucanian Blanda was one of the settlements scattered along the Noce valley. In the 3rd century BC, Blanda became depopulated following the Roman wars against Hannibal. According to Livy, the city was conquered by the consul Quintus Fabius Maximus in 214 BC and then became, after a century of difficulties, a Roman colony in the 1st century BC.

After an earthquake destroyed the city around 70 BC the Romans rebuilt the town on an orthogonal street plan, with a forum, basilica and three temples dedicated to the Capitoline Triad. A duumvirate was also established.

In the Augustan age the city was elevated to municipium, and the duumvirate continued. The adjective Julia was added to the name in honour of Augustus. However, Blanda was not a large city, built on just 5 hectares of land and rather an administrative and judicial centre that controlled a fairly large territory with an adjoining coastline.

The city was served by a complex water supply system, made up of cisterns in houses and springs, the remains of which have now been buried under the route of the state road.

The city prospered until the 5th century, when it was sacked and destroyed, perhaps by the Vandals. The town on the Palècastro hill was abandoned, but the community settled along the ridge of the Fiumarella di Tortora valley, creating a town that continued to be called Blanda Julia.

== The site ==
The ruins of Blanda form a major archaeological site.
