= Alyaksandr Feduta =

Belarusian politician (born 1964)

- Александр Иосифович Федута; Аляксандр Іосіфавіч Фядута
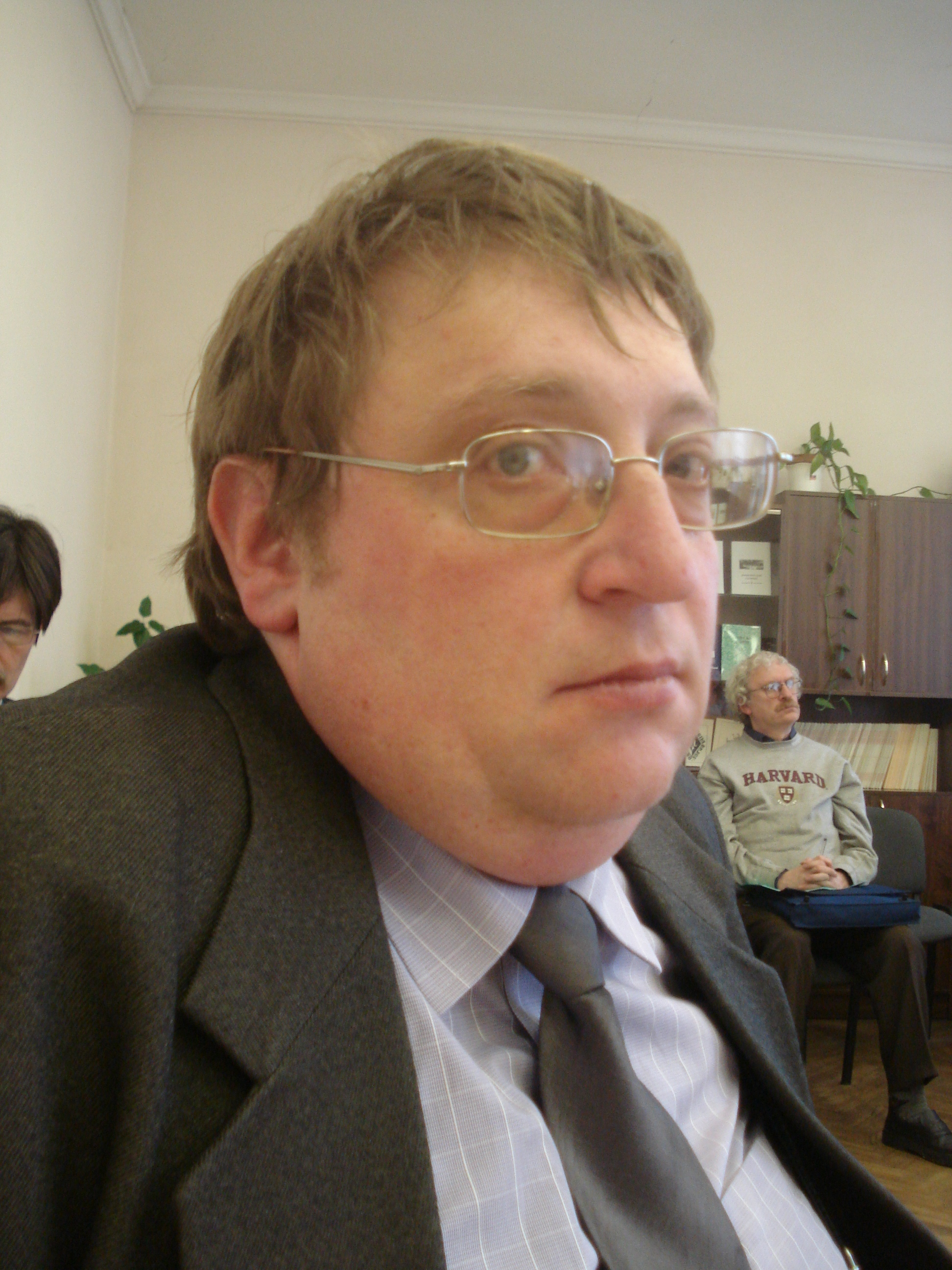
- Feduta in 2008
- Born: 3 November 1964 (age 61); Grodno, Byelorussian SSR, Soviet Union
- Education: Grodno State University
- Occupations: Politician, diplomat, executive

Alyaksandr Iosifovich Feduta (Belarusian: Аляксандр Іосіфавіч Фядута; born 3 November 1964 in Grodno) is a Soviet and Belarusian politician, literary critic and political scientist. Candidate of Philology, Doctor of Humanities (Poland) in the specialization Literary Studies and one of the authors of the Great Russian Encyclopedia.

== Biography ==
Graduated from the Faculty of Philology of the Grodno State University (1986), worked as a teacher of the Russian language and literature (1986–1991). In 1990 he was elected secretary of the Central Committee of the Komsomol of Belarus, in December 1991 he was the first secretary of the Central Committee of the Union of Youth of Belarus, remained in this position until 1994.

In 1994, he became a member of the campaign headquarters of Alexander Lukashenko. After the victory of the latter, he became the head of the socio-political information department of the Presidential Administration of Belarus. At the beginning of 1995, he was fired and worked as a journalist for a number of Russian and Belarusian non-state newspapers (Belorusskaya Delovaya Gazeta, Moskovskiye Novosti, Imya, Narodnaya Volya).

Candidate of Philological Sciences (1997, dissertation "The problem of the reader in the creative mind of A. S. Pushkin"). He worked on his doctoral dissertation, the topic "The problem of the reader in the literature of the Pushkin era."

He published journalistic articles in many printed and electronic media in Belarus. He specialized in the genre of political portrait. He is the author of the book Lukashenko: Political biography, published by the Russian publishing house “Referendum” in 2005. This is the first political biography of Alexander Lukashenko, written by a member of his first campaign headquarters.

In 2006, Elena Novozhilova, a journalist for the Belarusian News website, published the facts of using her articles in the American newspaper New Russian Word under the name of Alyaksandr Feduta. As a result, Feduta apologized to Novozhilova and the editors of the Belarusian News.

After the 2010 presidential elections in Belarus, Alyaksandr Feduta, who worked in the campaign headquarters of presidential candidate Uladzimir Nyaklyayew, was arrested on December 20 in Minsk by the Belarusian security services and imprisoned in the KGB detention center. Philologists from Russia and other countries appealed to the President and Government of the Russian Federation in defense of their colleague. Under another appeal in defense of Feduta and other arrested writers, artists, journalists, scientists, addressed to the Parliamentary Assembly of the Council of Europe and other interstate structures, singer Yuri Shevchuk, TV presenter Alexander Arkhangelsky, literary critic Nikolai Bogomolov, poets Mikhail Aizenberg, Natalya Gorbanevskaya and Timur Kibirov signed and dozens of other cultural and scientific figures from Russia, Lithuania, Ukraine, Estonia and other countries.

On January 11, 2011, Amnesty International recognized Feduta as a prisoner of conscience. On April 8, 2011, he was released on bail. On May 20, 2011, Alyaksandr Feduta was sentenced to two years of probation with a two-year probation.

In June 2015, Alyaksandr Feduta expressed his attitude to the scandal surrounding the installation and replacement of the plaque on the monument to A. S. Pushkin in Mogilev. The literary critic condemned the erection of the monument, on the pedestal of which there was a quote from Pushkin's poem "To the Slanderers of Russia", insulting for the Belarusians who participated in the uprising of 1831, noting that the official who allowed the installation of a monument with such a text should resign.

On September 5, 2022, the Minsk Regional Court sentenced Alexander Feduta to 10 years in prison in a maximum security colony. In mid-December 2022, he was transferred to Mogilev Correctional Colony No. 15 (Belarusian: Папраўчая ўстанова «Папраўчая калонія № 15»). Viasna and other human rights organizations in Belarus have recognized Feduta as a political prisoner.

On 13 December 2025, Feduta was released and exiled to Ukraine among 123 political prisoners, after the ease of the US sanctions on Belarusian potash industry.
