= List of companies of Belarus =

Location of Belarus

Belarus is a landlocked country in Eastern Europe bordered by Russia to the northeast, Ukraine to the south, Poland to the west, and Lithuania and Latvia to the northwest. Its capital and most populous city is Minsk. Over 40% of its 207,600 square kilometres (80,200 sq mi) is forested. Its strongest economic sectors are service industries and manufacturing.

For further information on the types of business entities in this country and their abbreviations, see "Business entities in Belarus".

== Notable firms ==
This list includes notable companies with primary headquarters located in the country. The industry and sector follow the Industry Classification Benchmark taxonomy. Organizations which have ceased operations are included and noted as defunct.

Notable companies Status: P=Private, S=State; A=Active, D=Defunct
Name	Industry	Sector	Headquarters	Founded	Notes	Status	
A1	Telecommunications	Mobile telecommunications	Minsk	1999	Mobile phones	P	A
Aliasworlds Entertainment	Technology	Software	Minsk	2002	Game developer	P	A
BelaPAN	Consumer services	Broadcasting & entertainment	Minsk	1991	News agency	P	A
Belarus High Technologies Park	Financials	Real estate holding & development	Minsk	2005	Tech park	P	A
Belarusbank	Financials	Banks	Minsk	1991	Commercial bank	P	A
Belarusian Railway	Industrials	Railroads	Minsk	1992	State-owned railway	S	A
Belaruskali	Industrials	Fertilizers	Salihorsk	1958	Potash fertilizers	S	A
Belavia	Consumer services	Airlines	Minsk	1996	State-owned airline	S	A
BelAZ	Industrials	Commercial vehicles & trucks	Zhodzina	1948	Haulage and earthmoving equipment (JSC, state own the majority or 100% of shares)	S	A
Belkommunmash	Industrials	Commercial vehicles & trucks	Minsk	1974	Manufacturer of public transport	P	A
BelMarket	Consumer services	Food retailers & wholesalers	Minsk	2007	Supermarkets	P	A
Belmedpreparaty	Health care	Pharmaceuticals	Minsk	1929	Pharmaceutical	P	A
Belneftekhim	Oil & gas	Exploration & production	Minsk	1997	State oil and gas	S	A
Belposhta	Consumer services	Delivery services	Minsk	1995	Postal service	S	A
Belshina	Consumer goods	Tires	Babruysk	1963	Tyre works (JSC, State own majority of shares)	S	A
Beltelecom	Telecommunications	Fixed line telecommunications	Minsk	1995	State-owned telecommunications	S	A
Byelorussian Steel Works	Basic materials	Iron & steel	Zhlobin	1984	Steel	P	A
Credexbank	Financials	Banks	Minsk	2001	Bank	P	A
Gazprom Transgaz Belarus	Oil & gas	Exploration & production	Minsk	1992	Natural gas, part of Gazprom (Russia)	P	A
Grodno Azot	Industrials	Fertilizers	Hrodna	1965	Nitrogen fertilizers	P	A
Minsk Motorcycle	Consumer goods	Automobiles	Minsk	1951	Motorcycles	P	A
Minsk Automobile Plant	Consumer goods	Automobiles	Minsk	1944	State-owned automotive	S	A
Minsk Kristall	Consumer goods	Distillers & vintners	Minsk	1893	Distillery, vodka	S	A
Minsk Tractor Works	Industrials	Commercial vehicles & trucks	Minsk	1946	Tractor manufacturer	P	A
Mozyr Oil Refinery	Oil & gas	Exploration & production	Mazyr	1975		P	A
Naftan Oil Refinery	Oil & gas	Exploration & production	Navapolack	1963	Diesel fuel, gasoline, chemicals	S	A
Olivaria Brewery	Consumer goods	Brewers	Minsk	1864	Brewery	P	A
TransAVIAexport Airlines	Industrials	Delivery services	Minsk	1992	Cargo airline	P	A
Vysheysha shkola	Consumer services	Publishing	Minsk	1954	State-owned publishing	S	A

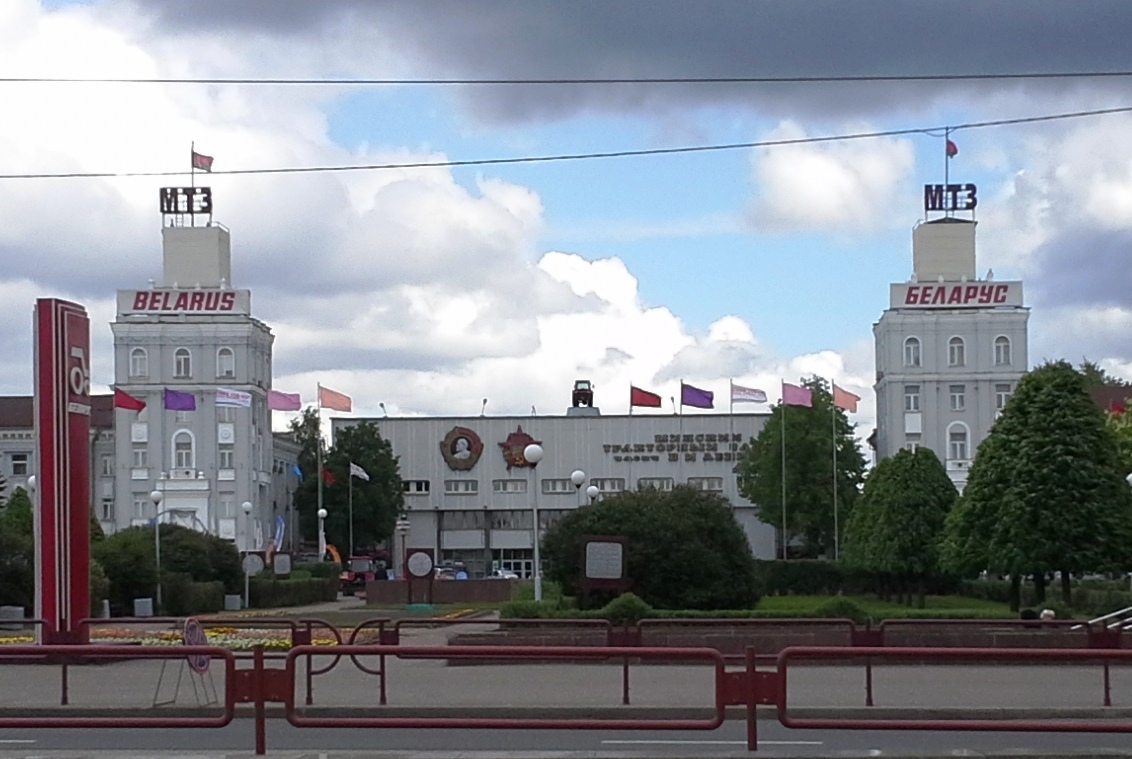
Entrance to Minsk Tractor Works building in Minsk.

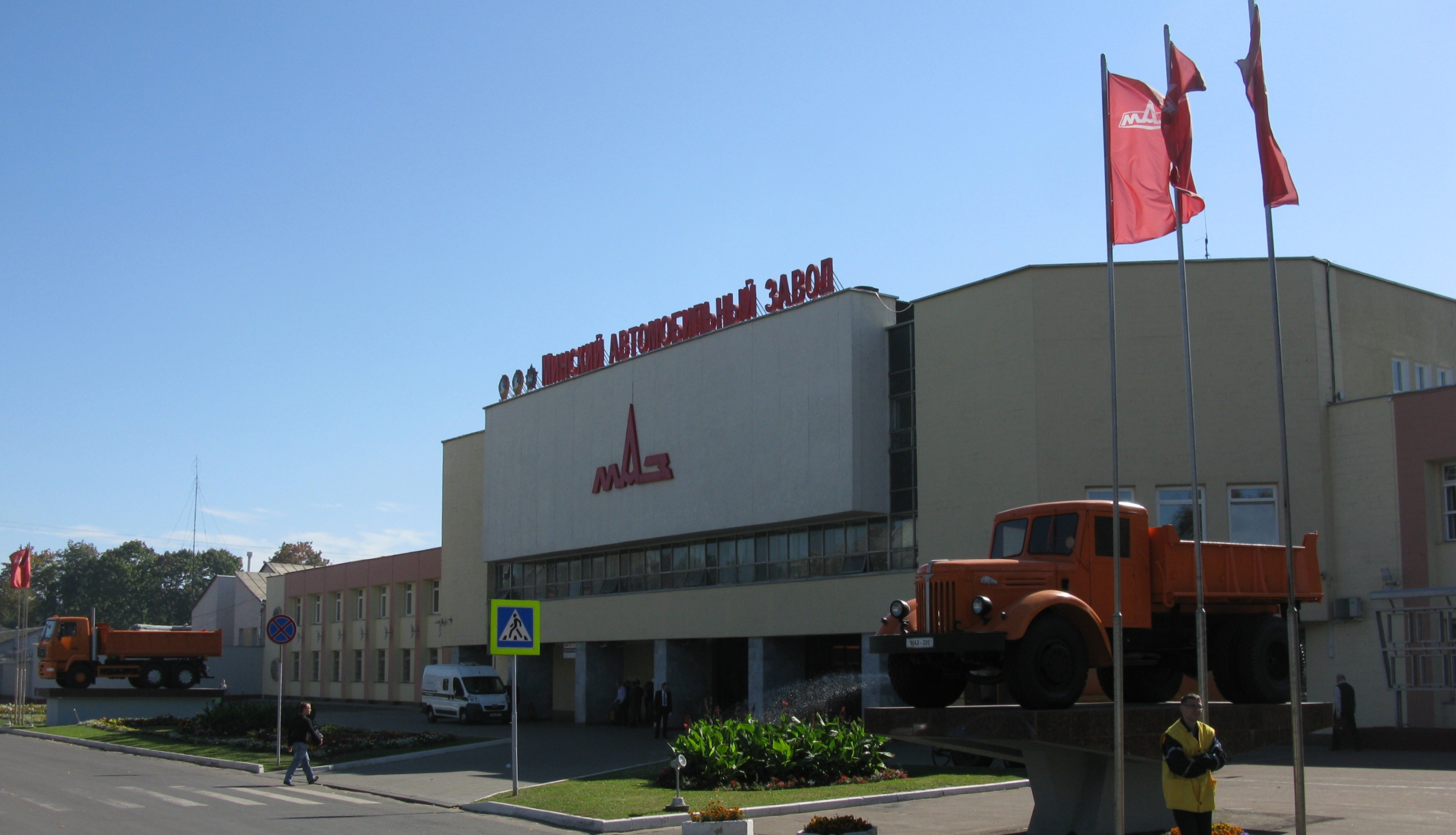
Central entrance to Minsk Automobile Plant.

== See also ==
- Economy of Belarus
