= Belarus–United States relations =

- Belarus: United States

Diplomatic mission
- Embassy of Belarus, Washington D.C.: Embassy of the United States, Minsk

Envoy
- Charge d'Affaires Pavel Shidlovsky: Charge d'Affaires Michael Kreidler

Interstate relations between the United States and Belarus began in 1991 upon the dissolution of the Soviet Union, of which Belarus had been a part.

In the 2000s, relations between the two states had turned sour, with the United States accusing Belarusian President Alexander Lukashenko of human rights violations amid their closening of relations with Russia, while Belarus responded by demanding that the U.S. not intervene in its internal affairs. In 2008, Belarus recalled its ambassador from Washington and insisted that the Ambassador of the United States must leave Minsk. According to the 2012 U.S. Global Leadership Report, only 20% of Belarusians approved of U.S. leadership, the fourth-lowest rating for any surveyed country in Europe. Various sanctions have been applied by the U.S. against Belarus, most significantly following the 2022 Russian invasion of Ukraine.

Under the second presidency of Donald Trump, which began in 2025, the two countries have taken steps aimed at improving relations, with U.S. delegations frequently visiting Belarus, resulting in the freeing of political prisoners held by Belarus per U.S. requests and the removal of some U.S. sanctions. Trump has since praised Lukashenko, positively describing relations between the two nations despite significant restrictions remaining in place, while Lukashenko has sought, thus far unsuccessfully, to serve as a channel for the West to communicate with his ally, President Vladimir Putin of Russia amid strained relations.

== Initial cooperation ==
On 25 December 1991, the United States recognized the independence of the Republic of Belarus, and on 28 December, Belarus and the United States established diplomatic relations. On 31 January 1992, the U.S. Embassy was officially opened in Minsk. In 1993, the embassy of Belarus was opened in Washington. Prime Minister of Belarus Vyacheslav Kebich received visiting U.S. Secretary of State Warren Christopher on 26 October 1993, promising new presidential elections.

On 15 January 1994, U.S. President Bill Clinton visited Minsk on a 6-hour state visit, following a recent visit to Moscow and acting as a preceding a visit to Switzerland. It was considered to be a "thank you" visit after Belarus agreed to transfer their Soviet nuclear stockpile to Russia. He was received by Chairman Stanislav Shushkevich at Minsk National Airport, after which Clinton laid a wreath on Victory Square and met with youth in the Academy of Sciences, as well as visited Kurapaty (wooded area on the outskirts of Minsk where a vast number of people were executed during the Great Purge by the NKVD). Clinton, as well as First Lady Hillary Clinton and their daughter Chelsea, also met children suffering from illnesses during a visit to Pediatric Hospital No. 4.

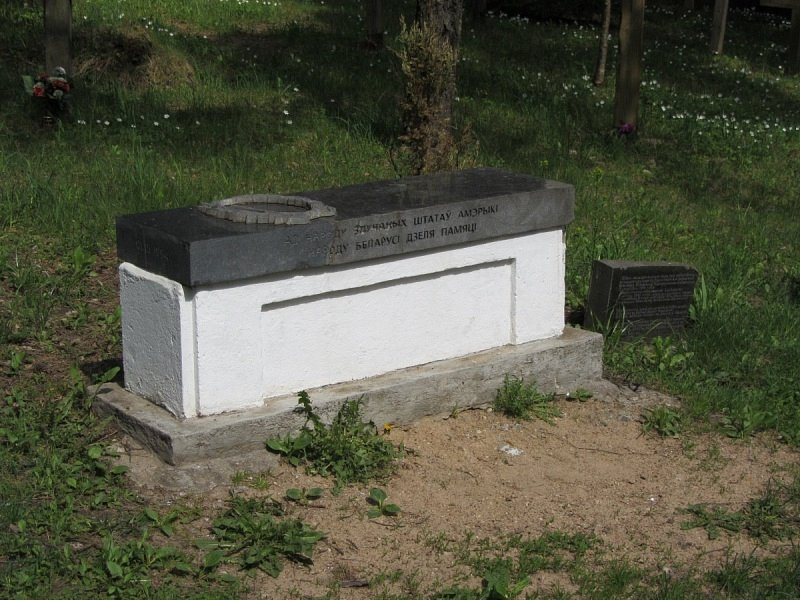
A memorial bench in Kurapaty presented by Bill Clinton

The United States has encouraged Belarus to conclude and adhere to agreements with the International Monetary Fund (IMF) on the program of macroeconomic stabilization and related reform measures, as well as to undertake increased privatization and to create a favorable climate for business and investment. Although there has been some American direct private investment in Belarus, its development has been relatively slow given the uncertain pace of reform.

An Overseas Private Investment Corporation agreement was signed in June 1992 but has been suspended since 1995 because Belarus did not fulfill its obligations under the agreement. Belarus is eligible for Export-Import Bank short-term financing insurance for U.S. investments, but because of the adverse business climate, no projects have been initiated.

== Deterioration of relations ==
=== Under George W. Bush's presidency (2001-2009) ===
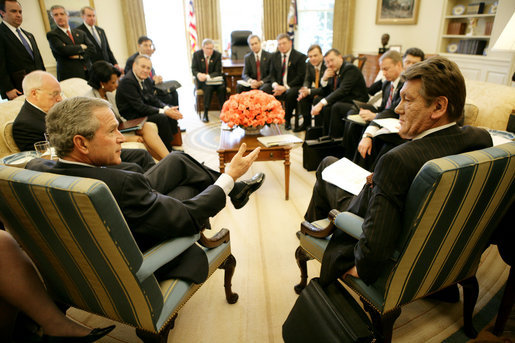
President of the U.S. George W. Bush discussing Belarus with the President of Ukraine Viktor Yushchenko

In early September 2001, the United States condemned Belarus for having irregularities in the recent election, causing Alexander Lukashenko to be re-elected. However, this criticism was short lived, as the United States came under the September 11, 2001 attacks two days later.

During Operation Iraqi Freedom, several American intelligence agencies accused Belarus of providing a safe haven for the deposed leader, Saddam Hussein, and his sons, Uday and Qusay. The only evidence that was presented was a cargo flight from the Iraqi capital of Baghdad to the Belarusian capital of Minsk, documentation of which was found after the capture of the Baghdad airport in April 2003. While some sources said that Lukashenko was close to Saddam and Saddam had thought about leaving Iraq to go to Belarus, Saddam was found in Iraq in December 2003 and his sons were killed in Iraq a few months earlier. In 2011 David J. Kramer claimed that Lukashenko handed out Belarusian passports to sons of Saddam Hussein.

Belarus-U.S. relations were further strained after Congress unanimously passed the Belarus Democracy Act of 2004, which the Belarusian government believes interferes with Belarusian internal affairs.

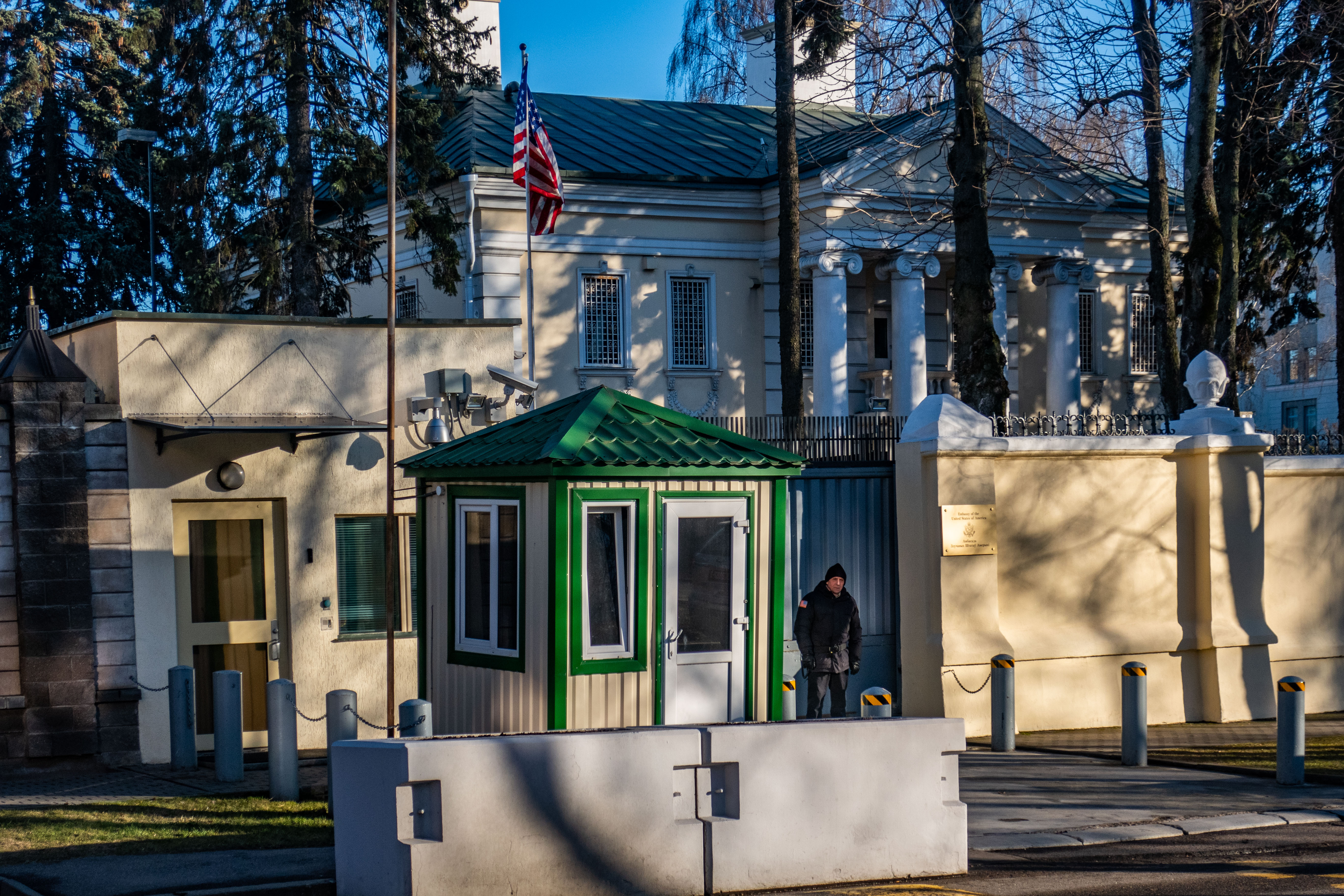
The American embassy in Minsk

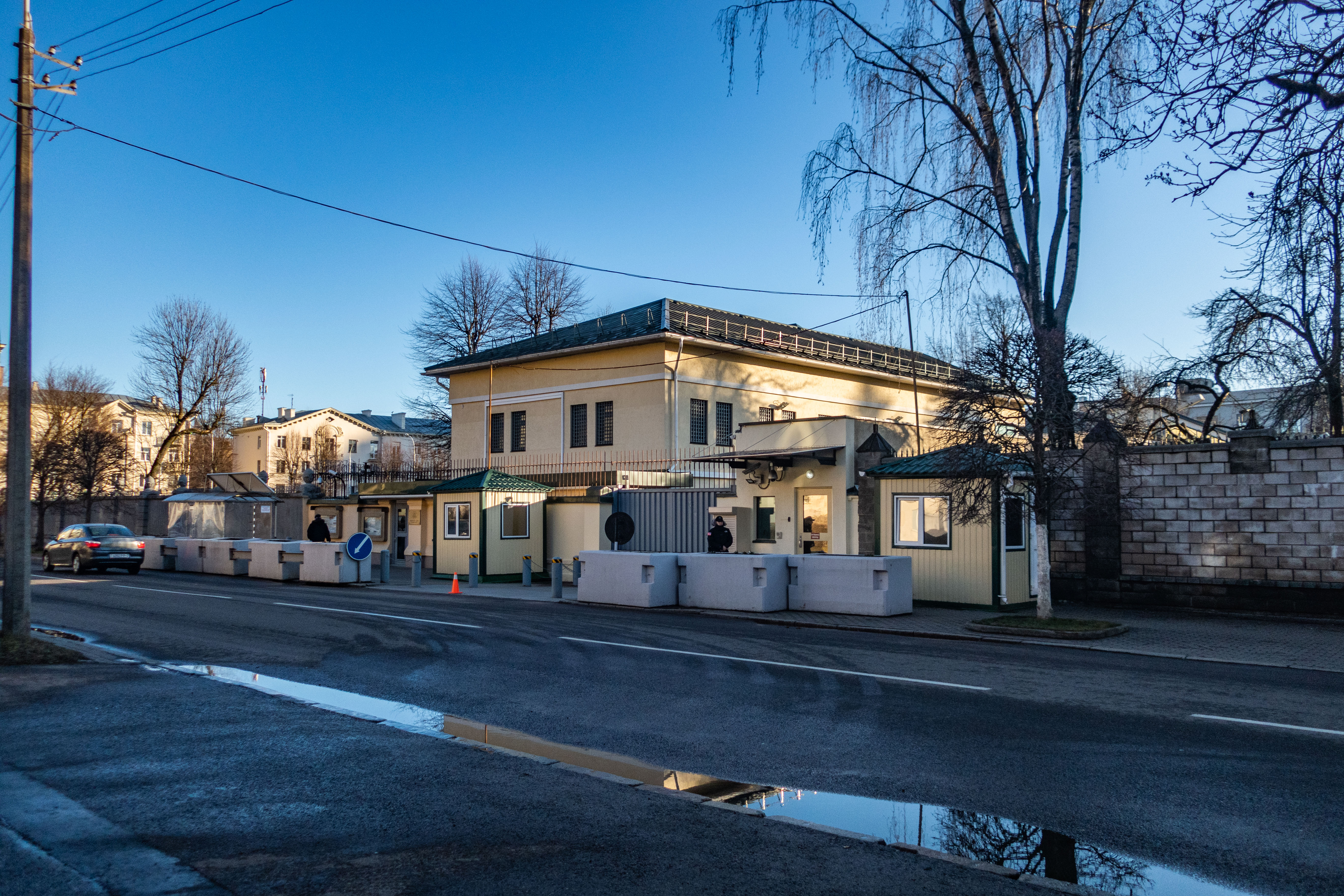
The American embassy in Minsk, consular section

Following the 2006 Belarusian presidential election, US introduced sanctions against Belarus individuals and companies for "the actions and policies... to undermine Belarus' democratic processes or institutions, manifested most recently in the fundamentally undemocratic March 2006 elections, to commit human rights abuses related to political repression, including detentions and disappearances, and to engage in public corruption including by diverting or misusing Belarusian public assets or by misusing public authority." The assets of said persons and companies in the US are frozen and transactions with them are prohibited.

In 2008, as retaliation for sanctions imposed on Belneftekhim, Belarus expelled American diplomats, reducing the American embassy staff from 35 to four individuals. In response, only six Belarusian diplomats were permitted to remain in the USA.

=== Under Barack Obama's presidency (2009-2017) ===
In November 2010, Secretary of State Hillary Clinton met with Belarusian Foreign Minister Sergei Martynov in Kazakhstan. They reached an agreement for Belarus to dispose of its highly enriched uranium by 2012, in exchange for U.S. assistance in developing a new nuclear reactor fueled by low-enriched uranium. However, this deal was suspended following the 2010 Belarusian elections and subsequent sanctions.

The sanctions list, as of January 2017, contains the following persons:

- President Alexander Lukashenko
- his son and national security assistant Viktor Lukashenko
- former Justice Minister Viktar Halavanau
- former deputy Justice Minister Oleg Slizhevsky
- former head of Belteleradio Aliaksandr Zimouski
- former director of the KGB Stepan Sukhorenko
- former Prosecutor General Petr Miklashevich,
- Dmitri Pavlichenko
- Viktor Sheiman
- Lidia Yermoshina
- Natalia Petkevich
- Uladzimir Navumau
- OMON commander Yury Podobed
- Alexander Radkov
- Vladimir Rusakevich
- Yury Sivakov

The list of the companies sanctioned includes Belshina, Belneftekhim, Polotsk-Steklovolokno, Grodno Azot, Naftan and others.

One of the few bilateral events during this period in relations was the visit to Minsk by the United States Air Forces in Europe Band in May 2015, where they performed at the Brest Fortress and the 2015 Minsk Victory Day Parade in honor of the 70th anniversary of the defeat of Nazism.

== Recent developments ==
=== Donald Trump's first term (2017-2021) ===
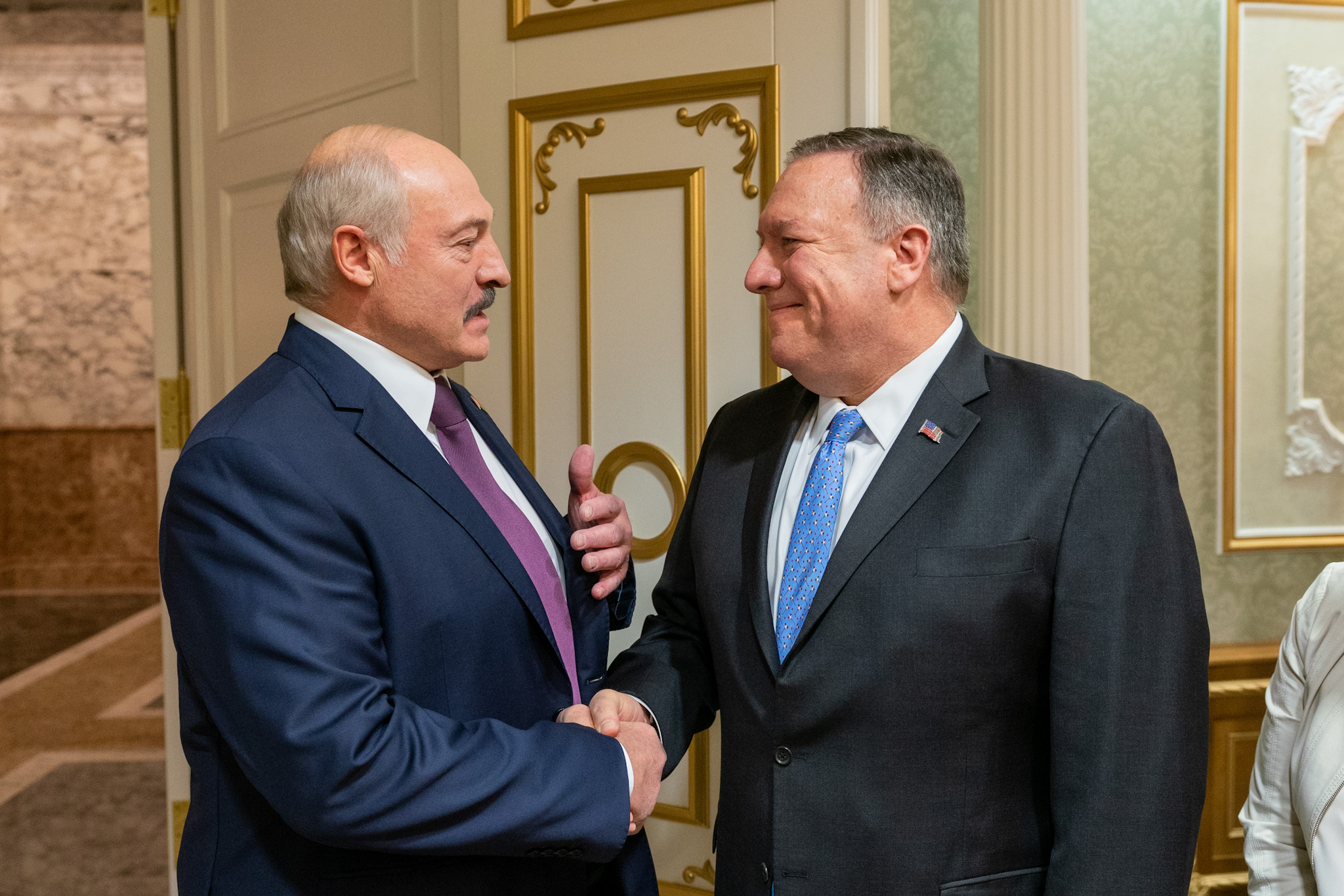
Lukashenko with U.S. Secretary of State Mike Pompeo in 2020

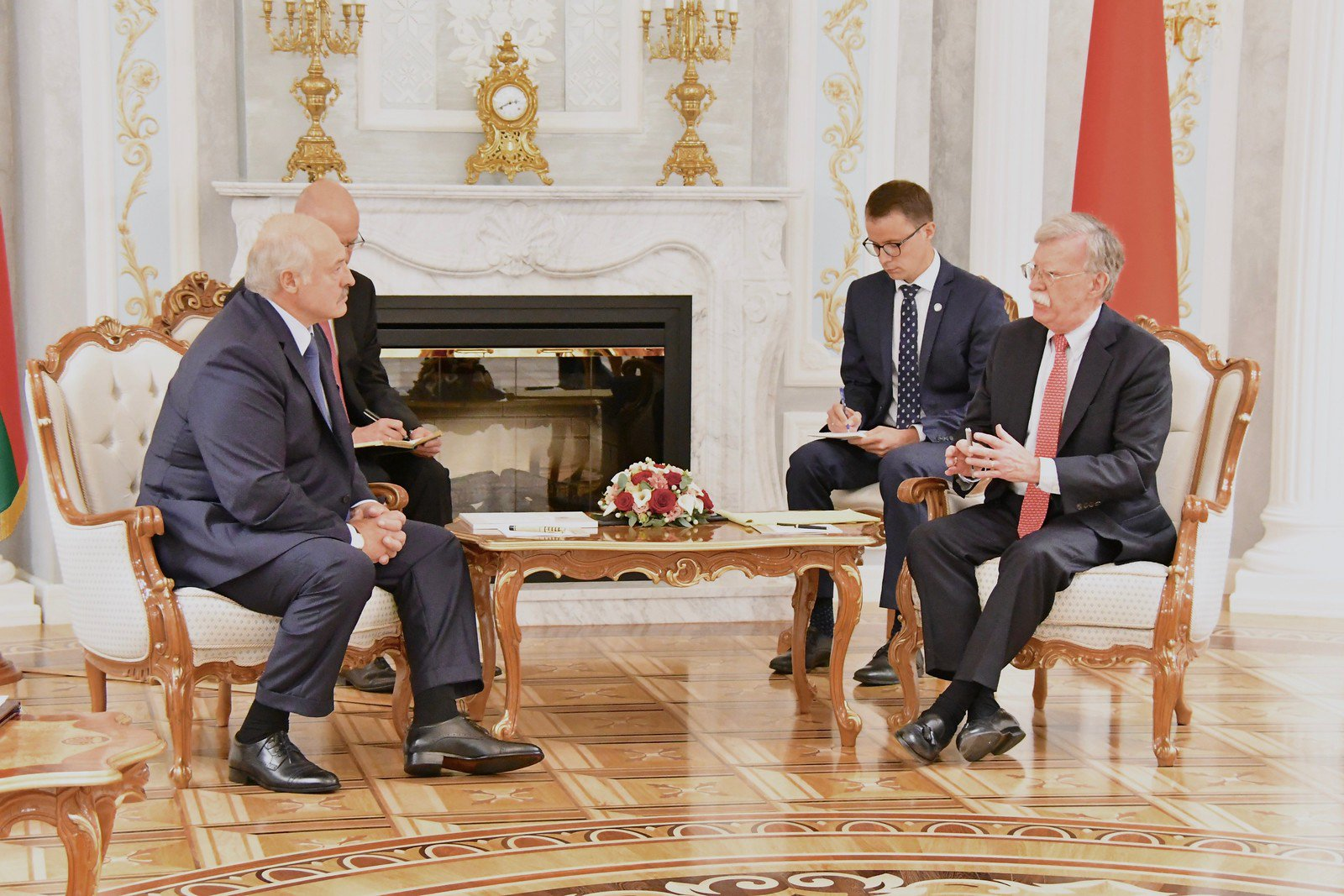
Lukashenko with National Security Adviser John Bolton in 2019

On August 29, 2019, National Security Adviser John Bolton met with Lukashenko in Minsk to discuss improving relations between the two countries. On 1 February 2020, U.S. Secretary of State Mike Pompeo visited Belarus for the first time in 26 years, to offer American aid after Russian decision to cut off energy supplies. In July 2020, Deputy Minister of Foreign Affairs Oleg Kravchenko was appointed Belarusian Ambassador to the United States.

In August 2020, Belarusian President Alexander Lukashenko said security forces had arrested "a number of" U.S. citizens, just days before the country went to the polls for a presidential election. In the speech, Lukashenko claimed Belarus was the victim of a "hybrid war", and that "we should expect dirty tricks from any side".

In the aftermath of the 2020 Belarusian presidential election, Secretary Pompeo voiced his deep concerns about how the election was "Not free and fair". In addition, he urged the Belarusian security forces to respect their citizens right to peacefully assemble, refrain from using force, and release persons who were wrongfully detained.

=== Under Joe Biden's presidency (2021-2025) ===
In May 2021 the United States and other countries denounced Belarus' authorities forcing Ryanair Flight 4978 to land in Belarus' territory. In October, Belarus forced the closure of the U.S. Embassy’s Public Diplomacy and USAID offices.

On 28 February 2022, the United States suspended its embassy in Belarus following intelligence from Ukraine that the country was preparing to join with its ally Russia in invading Ukraine.

=== Donald Trump's second term (2025-present) ===
In June 2025, US envoy Keith Kellogg met with Alexander Lukashenko to discuss relations between the US and Belarus and the resolution of the Russo-Ukrainian War. In September, Belarus released 52 political prisoners and the US lifted some sanctions on Belarusian flag carrier, Belavia. Belarus invited the U.S. to observe conduct of the Zapad 2025 exercise; in response, two American military observers attended.

Although the United States explicitly refused to recognize the legitimacy of Alexander Lukashenko's elections in 2020 and 2025, after gradual negotiations with Belarus, the United States managed to free over 430 political prisoners since July 2025 (for instance, the September 2025 meeting of US officials with Lukashenko resulted in the release of over 50 political prisoners in exchange for easing of some sanctions). The attempt to negotiate with Belarusian authorities became a part of a major shift in American relations with Belarus.

On 13 December 2025, Belarusian authorities freed 123 political prisoners, including Nobel Peace Prize laureate Ales Bialiatski, who was serving a ten-year prison term. Other prominent prisoners included former Belarusian presidential candidate Viktar Babaryka and activist Maria Kalesnikava. The exact number and names of prisoners were revealed after the release. The release was achieved after negotiations and a two-day visit of United States special envoy for Belarus, John Coale, to Minsk. The prisoners were transported to Ukraine and Lithuania. The former country received 114 prisoners, with the latter receiving the remaining nine. After the necessary medical assistance, the prisoners would then be transported further to Poland and Lithuania. According to Sviatlana Tsikhanouskaya, the decision to send prisoners to Ukraine was unexpected and had been made by Lukashenko. The December release of prisoners was achieved in exchange for lifting US sanctions on potash, a major export for Belarus. European Union sanctions remained in place.

== Trade ==
Belarus — United States trade volume (million USD, according to Belstat):

Largest export positions of Belarus (2017, according to Belstat):

- Potash fertilizers (135 million USD)
- Seamless pipes, tubes and profiles (25.8 million USD)
- X-ray equipment (12.2 million USD)
- Furniture (6.9 million USD)

Largest export positions of USA (2017, according to Belstat):

- Medical equipment (30.1 million USD)
- Cars (27.3 million USD)
- Vaccines, serums (20.2 million USD)
- Combustion piston engines (17 million USD)
- Frozen fish (14.3 million USD)
- Car bodies (13.4 million USD)
- Electric engines and generators (10.6 million USD)

== Diplomatic missions ==
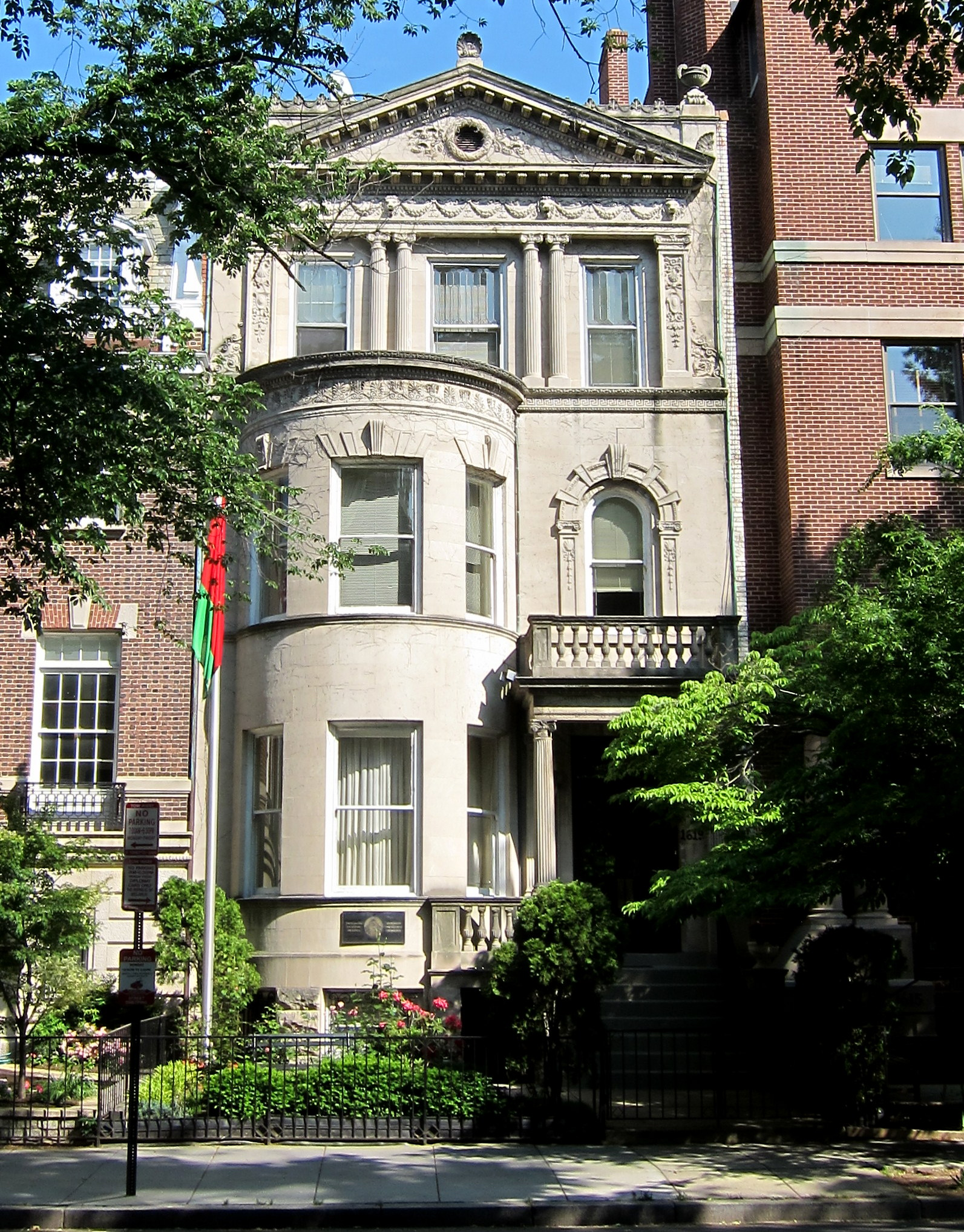
The Embassy of Belarus in Washington D.C.

The Embassy of Belarus in Washington, D.C. is located at 1619 New Hampshire Avenue, Northwest, Washington, D.C., in the Dupont Circle neighborhood. The embassy also operates a Consulate-General in New York City. The Chargé d'Affaires ad interim is Pavel Shidlovsky.

== See also ==
- Belarusian Americans
- Drazdy conflict
- List of people and organizations sanctioned in relation to human rights violations in Belarus
