= Gennady Vorontsov =

Belarusian lawyer and politician

- Генадзь Варанцоў
- Official portrait

Minister of Justice of Belarus
- In office 23 January 1997 – 21 September 2001
- President: Alexander Lukashenko
- Preceded by: Valentin Sukalo
- Succeeded by: Viktor Golovanov

Personal details
- Born: 1948 Vileyka, Minsk region, Byelorussian SSR, Soviet Union
- Died: 18 November 2023 (aged 74–75)
- Education: Belarusian State University

Gennady Nikolayevich Vorontsov (Russian: Геннадий Николаевич Воронцов; 1948 – 18 November 2023) was a Belarusian lawyer who served as Minister of Justice of Belarus from 1997 to 2001.

== Biography ==
Gennady Vorontsov was born in Vileyka, Minsk region, in 1948. He started his professional career as a milling machine operator at a factory in Molodechno in 1964. Vorontsov's work was interrupted for three years while he served in the Red Army. Upon his return, he rose through the ranks and reached the position of engineer.

Later, Vorontsov pursued higher education and obtained a law degree from Belarusian State University in 1976. Upon graduation, he was elected as a judge in Molodechno, becoming its chairman in 1980. In February 1991, he was appointed to the position of a judge in the Supreme Court of Belarus. In 1995, Vorontsov left the judicial system and became the head of the judicial department of the Minsk Regional Executive Body.

President Alexander Lukashenko appointed Vorontsov as Minister of Justice in 1997. During his tenure, he oversaw the enforcement of the new criminal code, criticized those parties that urged a boycott of the 2000 Belarusian parliamentary election, and wrote letters to newspapers urging them to censor mentions of opposition groups, such as Charter 97. Vorontsov responded to various criticisms directed at the Belarusian government, such as those of the new protest law, the forced re-registration of NGOs, and the inquiry of the Inter-Parliamentary Union mission on the issue of mistreatment of Belarusian MPs. He also interacted with the ILO on the topic of the suppression of Belarusian trade unions, attempting to convince them that the issue was nonexistent. Vorontsov was dismissed in September 2001, shortly after the Belarusian presidential elections.

Later, he worked as a deputy head of the Belarusian Lawyers Union from 2002 to 2013. Vorontsov died on 18 November 2023.
