= Evgeny Kovalenko =

Belarusian politician (born 1980)

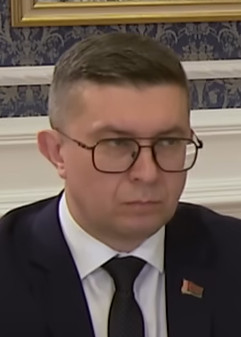
- Kovalenko in 2025

Minister of Justice
- Incumbent
- Assumed office 22 April 2024
- President: Alexander Lukashenko
- Prime Minister: Roman Golovchenko
- Preceded by: Sergei Khomenko

Personal details
- Born: 26 June 1980 (age 45) Borzya, Chita Oblast, Russian SFSR, Soviet Union
- Education: Belarusian State Economic University; Minsk State Linguistic University; Academy of Public Administration
- Awards: Medal "For Labour Merits"

Evgeny Iosifovich Kovalenko (Russian: Евгений Иосифович Коваленко; born 26 June 1980) is a Belarusian politician serving as minister of justice since 2024. From 2014 to 2015, he served as deputy minister of justice.

== Early life and education ==
Evgeny Kovalenko was born on 26 June 1980 in Borzya, Russian SFSR, into a military family.

In 2002, he obtained a law degree from Belarusian State Economic University. Three years later, he obtained an English language degree from Minsk State Linguistic University. In 2008, he obtained a PhD in law by defending a thesis titled "Protection of foreign investments in Belarus in accordance with international treaties". His final degree was from the Academy of Public Administration in 2012.

== Career ==
Kovalenko started his career as a marketer in Bobruisk in 2002. Upon obtaining a law degree two years later, he moved to the Ministry of Justice. There Kovalenko worked at the department for regulatory activities, rising to the position of head of the division that worked on civil, ecological, and foreign economic relations. Before his departure from the Ministry, Kovalenko spent one year as head of the department of legal review.

In 2010, Kovalenko was appointed as the deputy head of the legal department of the Administration of the President. He briefly returned to the Ministry in 2014 to serve as deputy head and was appointed chairman of the National Center of Legal Information in 2015. In 2020, he returned to the Administration of the President to serve as head of the legal department.

On 22 April 2024, Kovalenko was appointed as the Minister of Justice of Belarus. Alexander Lukashenko, commenting on the appointment, said that Kovalenko already performed similar functions at the Administration. First Deputy Head of the Administration Maxim Ryzhenkov praised him for his speedy handling of legal issues in 2020. Kovalenko was introduced as the new minister by the First Deputy Prime Minister Nikolai Snopkov. Kovalenko said that in his role he would continue enforcement of the constitutional amendments adopted in 2022.

Kovalenko serves as Deputy Head of the Belarusian Lawyers Union.

== Personal life ==
Evgeny Kovaleno is married and has two children.

== Awards ==
- Medal "For Labour Merits" (Belarus, 2021)
