= Oleg Slizhevsky =

Belarusian politician (born 1972)

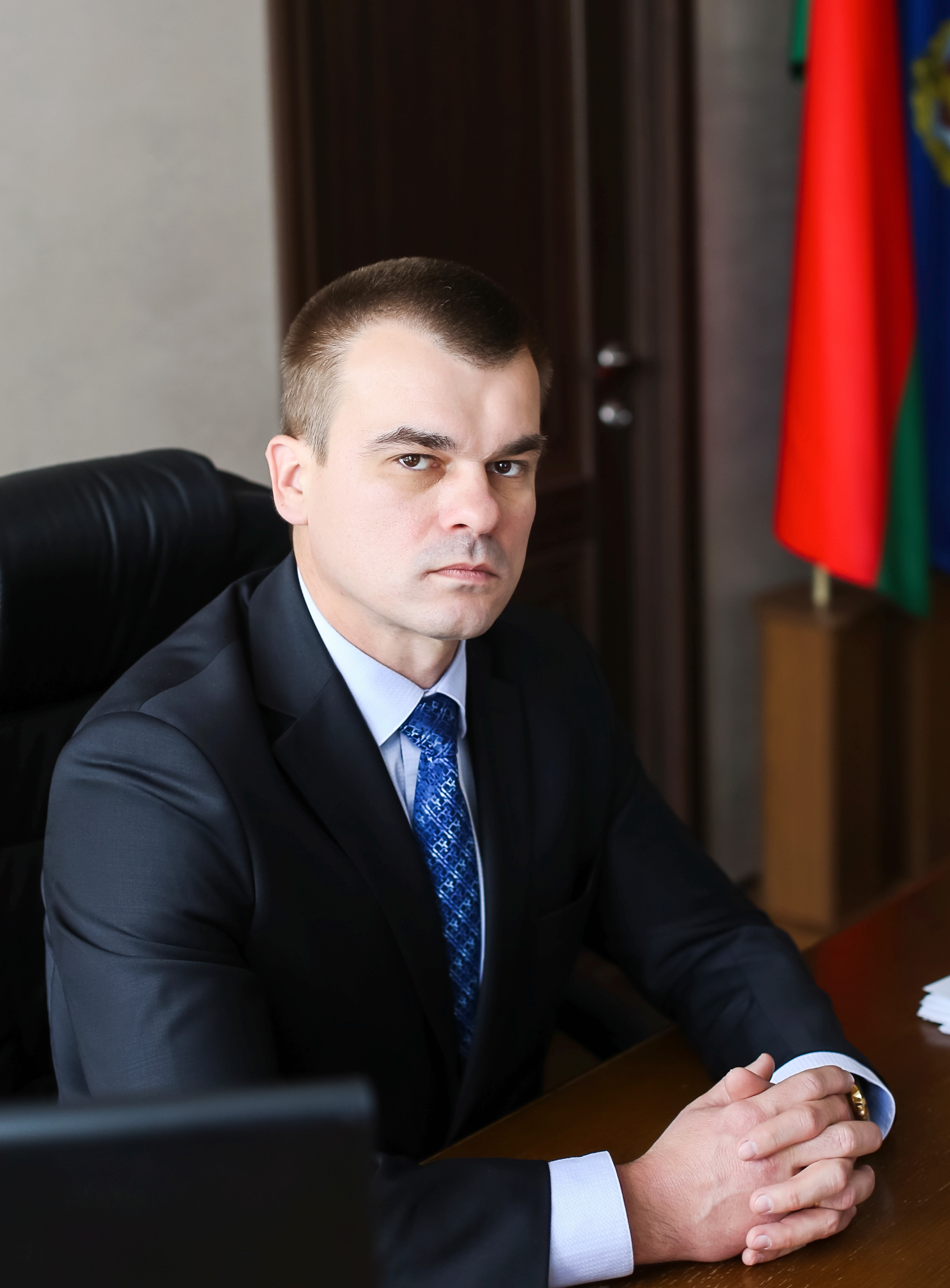
- Slizhevsky in 2019

Minister of Justice
- In office 13 December 2011 – 18 October 2021
- President: Alexander Lukashenko
- Prime Minister: Andrei Kobyakov; Syarhey Rumas; Roman Golovchenko
- Preceded by: Viktor Golovanov
- Succeeded by: Sergei Khomenko

Personal details
- Born: 16 August 1972 (age 53) Grodno, Byelorussian SSR, Soviet Union
- Education: University of Grodno; Belarusian State University; Academy of Public Administration

Oleg Leonidovich Slizhevsky (Russian: Олег Леонидович Слижевский; born 16 August 1972) is a Belarusian politician who served as minister of justice from 2011 to 2021. In 2007, he was elected member of the Central Election Commission.

== Early life and education ==
Oleg Slizhevsky was born in Grodno on 16 August 1972.

In 1999, he obtained a master's degree in law from the University of Grodno. In 2005, he finished a graduate program at the Belarusian State University without defending a thesis. In 2012, he graduated from the Academy of Public Administration.

== Career ==
Slizhevsky's first work was at a radio factory in Grodno. Later, he was conscripted into the army where he served from 1990 to 1992. Slizhevsky's first position in the legal field was as a bailiff at the Grodno district court from 1996 to 1999. From there he moved to work at the Court Support Department of the Grodno Executive Committee.

In 2002, Slizhevsky was promoted to the Ministry of Justice, where he mainly oversaw civil society organizations, rising to the position of the head of that department. In 2010, he was appointed as the head of the Labor Arbitration Tribunal at the ministry, a job that involved the reconciliation of collective labor disputes, mainly involving people employed by the state.

Slizhevsky was appointed Minister of Justice on 13 December 2011.

Slizhevsky was dismissed on 18 October 2021, officially for a transfer to another job. The oppositional newspaper Nasha Niva claimed that he lost his position due to the slow revocation of licenses of Belarusian lawyers. Later, he was appointed as the head of the legal department for the Union State government apparatus.

== Personal life ==
Slizhevsky is married; his wife works as an adviser to the chairman of the Supreme Court of Belarus.

== Awards ==
- Medal "For Labor Merits" (Belarus, 2019)
- Honorary Diploma of the Council of Ministers (Belarus, 2021)
