= Sergei Khomenko =

Belarusian politician (born 1966)

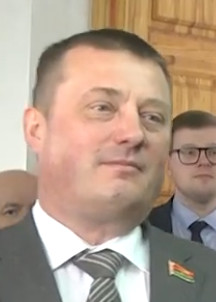
- Khomenko in 2025

Minister of Justice
- In office 18 October 2021 – 22 April 2024
- President: Alexander Lukashenko
- Prime Minister: Roman Golovchenko
- Preceded by: Oleg Slizhevsky
- Succeeded by: Evgeny Kovalenko

Personal details
- Born: 21 September 1966 (age 59)

Sergei Nikolaevich Khomenko (Russian: Сергей Николаевич Хоменко; born 21 September 1966) is a Belarusian politician serving as deputy speaker of the Council of the Republic since 2024. From 2021 to 2024, he served as minister of justice.
