= Ranch Rush =

2008 video game

- Developer: Aliasworlds Entertainment
- Publisher: FreshGames
- Platforms: Windows, iOS, MacOS
- Release: 10 July 2008 (Windows); 13 March 2009 (Macintosh); 11 July 2009 (iOS)
- Genre: Simulation
- Mode: Single-player

Ranch Rush is a farm management video game developed by Aliasworlds Entertainment and published by FreshGames in 2008. A sequel, Ranch Rush 2, was released in 2010.

== Story ==
Sara works in a nursery and loves her job. But one day the owner Jim tells her that they will have to close the nursery. In order to save the nursery, Sara asks Jim to let her use an unused plot of land where she plans to grow vegetables and tend animals. She hopes the profit from selling the produce will save the nursery.

Players have to help Sara complete customer orders by harvesting produce such as clovers, wheat, corn and tomatoes and tend animals such as cows, sheep, bees, and ostriches. There are also ketchup machine, bread machine, jam machine, etc. At the end of each week Sara has the opportunity to sell any extra produce in the Farmer's Market. Depending on performance, players also have the opportunity of winning trophies for completing week 1, not getting stung by bees, completing an order super fast, finishing expert mode without failing an order, etc.

Once Sara completes all the levels, Jim tells her that the nursery is saved and makes her a partner.

== Reception ==
Reception

Review scores
| Publication | Score |
|---|---|
| Gamezebo | 4.5/5 (Windows) |
| Den of Geek | 4/5 (Windows) |

Ranch Rush received generally positive reviews from critics. Gamezebo gave the Windows version of Ranch Rush an overall score of 4.5 out of five, expressing that the game differentiates itself from other, similar time management games through its "superb gameplay balance" and strategic aspects, further stating that "almost all aspects of the gameplay come together perfectly", but criticized some minor control issues. Den of Geek praised the game's difficulty curve, as well as its graphics & sound.

== Legacy ==
A sequel set on a tropical island, Ranch Rush 2, was released in 2010 for Mac, Windows, and iOS.
