= Belshina =

Belarusian tyre manufacturer

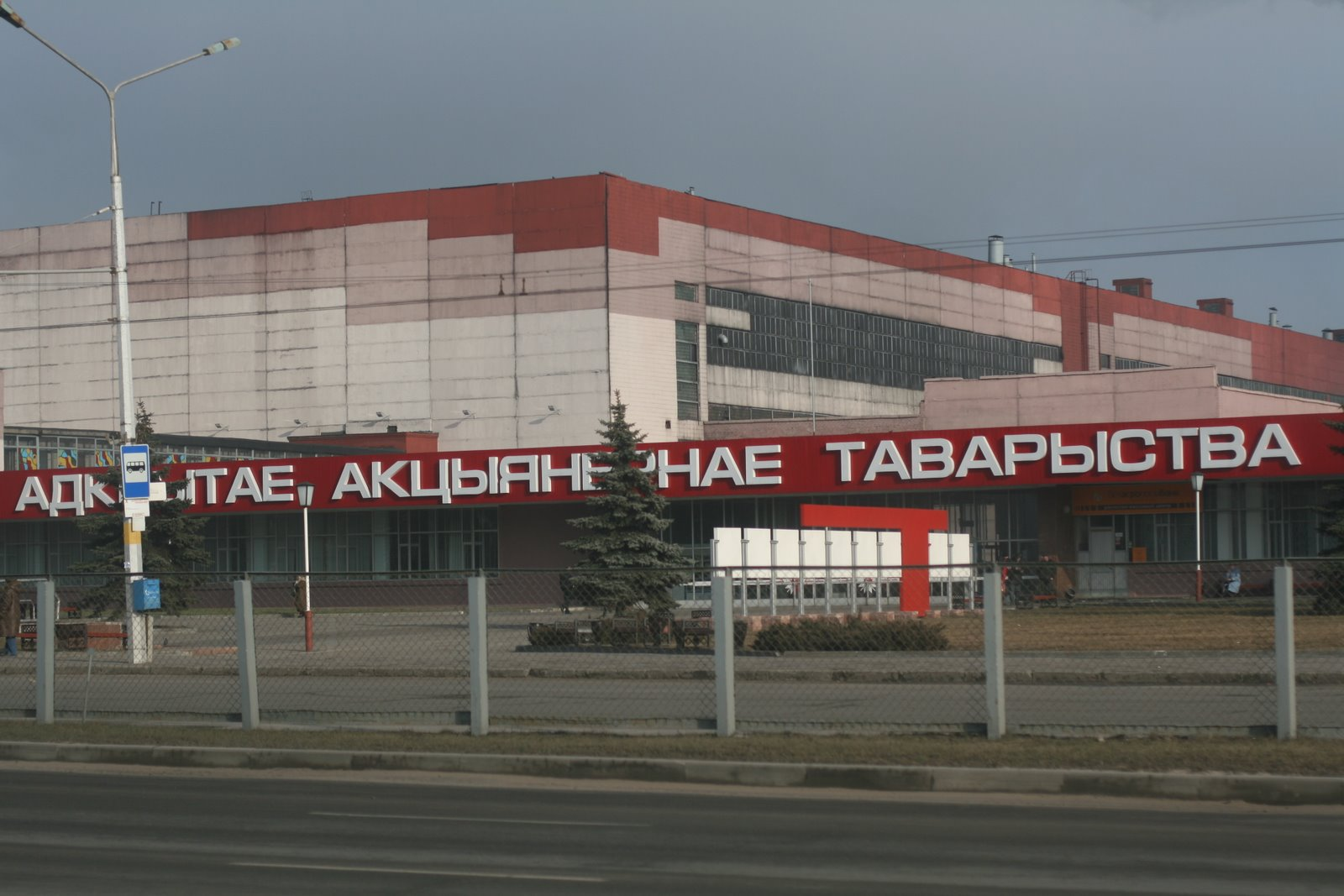
- Belshina headquarters in Babruisk
- Founded: 1963; 63 years ago
- Headquarters: Babruisk, Minsk Region, Belarus
- Key people: Alexander Kovalyov(CEO)
- Products: tyres
- Website: www.belshina.by/en/

Belshina (Belarusian: Белшына, Russian: Белшина) is a tyre manufacturer in Belarus. The name is an abbreviation for "Belaruskaya shina", or "Belarusian Tyre".

The Belarusian tyre works is located in the Belarusian industrial city Babruysk. Belshina produces over 180 tyre sizes for cars, trucks, mining trucks, road construction machinery, electrical vehicles, tractors and agricultural machinery. Over 90 per cent of tyres are radial. All types of products (pneumatic tyres) are protected by patents by two parameters: design and appearance. Belshina cooperate with partners from 36 countries.

Belshina is a main sponsor of football team Belshina Bobruisk which plays in Belarusian Premier League.

== History ==
The construction of the Belarusian Tyre Works "Belshina" in Bobruisk was sanctioned by Decree of the Council of Ministers of the USSR #299 dated March 25, 1963 "On steps aimed at better utilization of workforce of the Belarusian Soviet Socialist Republic" and by resolution No. 90-p dated June 11, 1965, by Supreme Soviet. On December 31, 1971, the research facility of the mechanical services unit produced the first Belarusian tyre for BelAZ mining truck of 27-ton lifting capacity.

On December 31, 1972, the farm tyre plant was put into service. Truck and car tyre plant began to roll out tyres on September 30, 1976. On January 31, 1985, a fourth plant joined Belshina family, it was the earthmover tyre plant. In May 1992 the State Committee on Industry of the Republic of Belarus issued a decree transforming the Belshina Production Amalgamation into Belarus Tyre Works Belshina. On September 26, 2002, the Executive Committee of Mogilev Province adopted resolution No.18-13 on registering an open joint stock company Belshina (Certificate of Registration No.700016217 of 2003-09-27).

On April 13, 2011, Belshina Radial for bus and truck got Standard Nasional Indonesia (SNI) - Indonesia National Standard which Indonesia is not produce the items.

Significant events of recent years:

- 2010. The 100 millionth tyre for passenger cars was assembled and vulcanized.
- 2013. The development and production of new tyre lines Artmotion (tyes for passenger cars), Escortera (tyres for trucks and buses), Bravado (tyres for light trucks and vans) has started.
- 2014. Serial production of new tyres under the brands Artmotion Spike (studded tyres for passenger cars), Astarta (tyres for crossovers and SUVs) and Forcerra (tyres for dump trucks) has begun.
- 2014. The first Galero Agro tyres (tyres for agricultural machinery) were vulcanized.
- 2014. The first 18-inch passenger car tyres were manufactured.
- 2015. The first tyres for the factory equipment of Geely cars were developed (Bel-295 model, size 225/65 R17).
- 2016. The first radial tubeless tyre of size 40.00R57 was released (model Bel-350).
- 2017. The first Belarusian radial tubeless tyre 59/80R63 with a career tread pattern, model Bel-190, was introduced. This is the largest tyre that is produced in the world today. Its height is more than 4 m, the tread width is 1.47 m, and the weight is 5.7 tons. Only Bridgestone, Michelin, Titan Tire produced tyres of this size before Belshina.
- 2018. An experimental batch of 59/80R63 super-large radial tyres was sent to Russia for testing in a quarry. The tyres were tested on a 450-ton BelAZ-75710 dump truck.
- 2022. The first passenger tyres with a 19-inch rim were released (Astarta SUV Bel-340 model, size 255/55 R19).

== Political scandals and international sanctions ==
In 2011, following the violent crackdown of opposition protests after the falsified 2010 Belarusian presidential election, the United States has imposed sanctions against several Belarusian state-owned companies, including Belshina. U.S. citizens were prohibited from doing business with several companies of the Belneftekhim conglomerate: Naftan oil refinery, Grodno Azot fertilizer manufacturer, Grodno Khimvolokno fiber manufacturer and Belshina tire factory.

The sanctions against Belshina and other Belneftekhim companies were temporarily suspended in 2015.

In 2020, several hundreds workers of Belshina have joined mass nationwide protests against the authoritarian president Alexander Lukashenko after a rigged presidential election. A strike with political demands was declared but never started as Belshina's management executed pressure on the company's workers. Several striking workers were fired.

In April 2021, full-scale sanctions against Belshina were renewed following brutal political repressions against the opposition after another rigged presidential election that took place in August 2020 and was accompanied by mass protests across Belarus. On 9 August 2021, the US has added Belshina CEO Andrei Bunakov to the SDN list.

On 2 December 2021, Belshina was added to the sanctions list of the European Union. Switzerland joined the EU sanctions on 20 December.

In 2022, Japan and Ukraine also imposed sanctions on Belshina.

In March 2024, the General Court of the European Union granted Belshina's annulment application from the EU sanctions list. According to the court, Belshina was loss-making by the time the EU sanctions were imposed, and thus not a “substantial source of income” for the Lukashenko regime, while the European Council failed to show that dismissal of the Belshyna employees was for political reasons (officially, the participants of the strike were fired for being absent from work).

In October 2024, the Belarusian Investigative Center stated that Belshina supplies products to Russian defense enterprises.
