= Valentin Sukalo =

Belarusian lawyer politician

- Валянцін Сукала
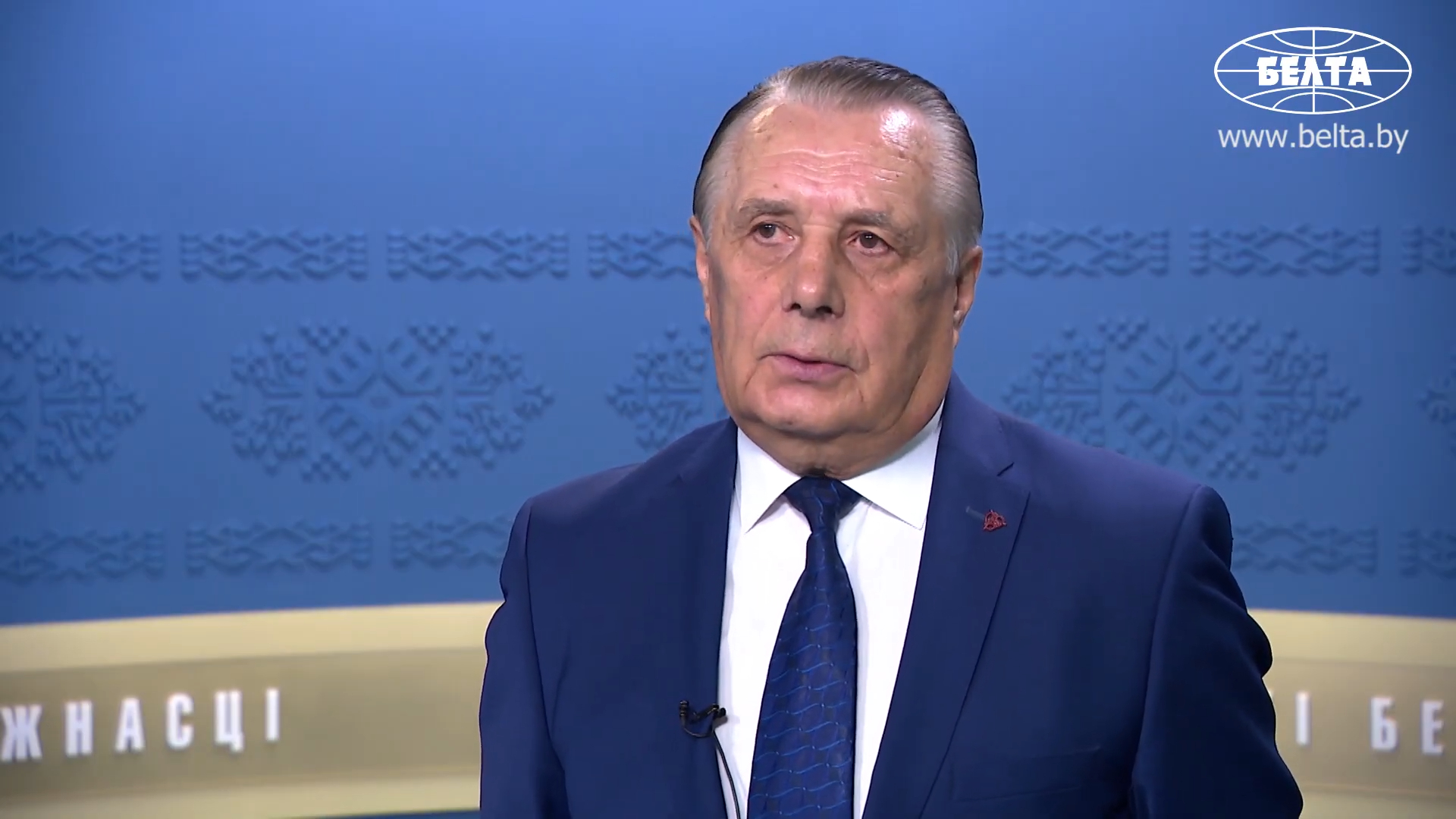
- Sukalo in 2020

Chairman of the Supreme Court of Belarus
- Incumbent
- Assumed office 4 January 1997
- President: Alexander Lukashenko
- Preceded by: Vladimir Karavay

Minister of Justice of Belarus
- In office 27 October 1994 – 4 January 1997
- President: Alexander Lukashenko
- Preceded by: Leonid Dashuk
- Succeeded by: Gennady Vorontsov

Personal details
- Born: 16 August 1942 (age 84) Minsk, Byelorussian SSR, Soviet Union
- Education: Belarusian State University
- Awards: Order of the Fatherland

Valentin Olegovich Sukalo (Russian: Валентин Олегович Сукало; born 16 August 1942) is a lawyer who served as the Minister of Justice of Belarus from 1994 to 1997 and as the chairman of the Supreme Court of Belarus since 1997.

== Early life and education ==
Valentin Sukalo was born to a working-class family in Minsk on 16 August 1942. Initially, he studied at Minsk Technical School, and later served in the military, where his commanders advised him to pursue higher education. Sukalo followed their advice and graduated from the law faculty of Belarusian State University in 1968.

== Career ==
Valentin Sukalo started his professional career as a lathe operator at the Minsk Tractor Plant. After graduating from the university in 1968, he was appointed as the only judge in the Myadzyel district court. Four years later, he was transferred to the Minsk regional court and was appointed its chairman in 1977.

In 1984, he started to work as Deputy of the Minister of Justice of the Byelorussian SSR. In 1987, Sukalo was appointed as a head of the ministry's department that oversaw the work of the general courts, and he was promoted to minister in 1988. From 1989 to 1992, Sukalo worked as the First Deputy Chairman of the Supreme Court of the USSR. Upon the collapse of the Soviet Union, he returned to Belarus to his previous position as Deputy Minister.

After Alexander Lukashenko was elected President in 1994, Sukalo was appointed as Minister of Justice of Belarus. According to Sukalo, in his new position, he was occupied with three tasks: drafting a new Constitution for Belarus, introducing a democratic electoral system, and protecting human rights.

In January 1997, following the successful 1996 referendum that consolidated his power, Alexander Lukashenko appointed Sukalo as chairman of the Supreme Court of Belarus.

== Personal life ==
Sukalo is married.

== Awards ==
- Honorary lawyer (Belarus, 2000)
- Honorary Diploma of the National Assembly (Belarus, 2002)
- Honorary Diploma of the Council of Ministers (Belarus, 2022)
- Third class of the Order of the Fatherland (Belarus, 2022)
