= Drazdy conflict =

Coordinates: 53°56′46″N 27°30′5″E

The Drazdy conflict (sometimes spelled Drozdy) was a July 1998 incident involving the Government of Belarus and diplomats from other nations. It began with the leader of Belarus, Alexander Lukashenko, declaring the Drazdy Complex as property of the government and shutting it down for repairs. The Drazdy Complex housed several diplomats from various nations, including several Western nations. Though Lukashenko tried to negotiate a situation with Western powers, such as France and Germany, by appointing Uladzimir Herasimovich for talks, the situation was not solved in time. In protest of the incident, the US temporarily recalled its ambassador, Daniel V. Speckhard, who spent one year back in Washington before returning to Belarus. One of the results of the incident was that the European Union issued Lukashenko and approximately 130 other government officials with travel bans that prevented them from traveling to fourteen of the then-fifteen EU states. This also began to lead the United States and non-EU states to issue similar bans (the United States has an exemption for visits to the United Nations headquarters in New York City, New York by the banned officials). According to ITAR-TASS and BelaPAN, the Drazdy Complex is now used as a residence for the president and the evicted diplomats were given new locations in Minsk.

Upon reaching a compromise on 10 December 1998, The Council of the European Union repealed visa bans for Belarusian officials on 22 February 1999.

== See also ==
- Foreign relations of Belarus
- Belarus–United States relations
