= Ministry of Justice (Belarus) =

Government ministry of Belarus

Ministry of Justice of the Republic of Belarus
- Міністэрства юстыцыі Рэспублікі Беларусь; Ministerstva yustytsyi Respubliki Byelarus
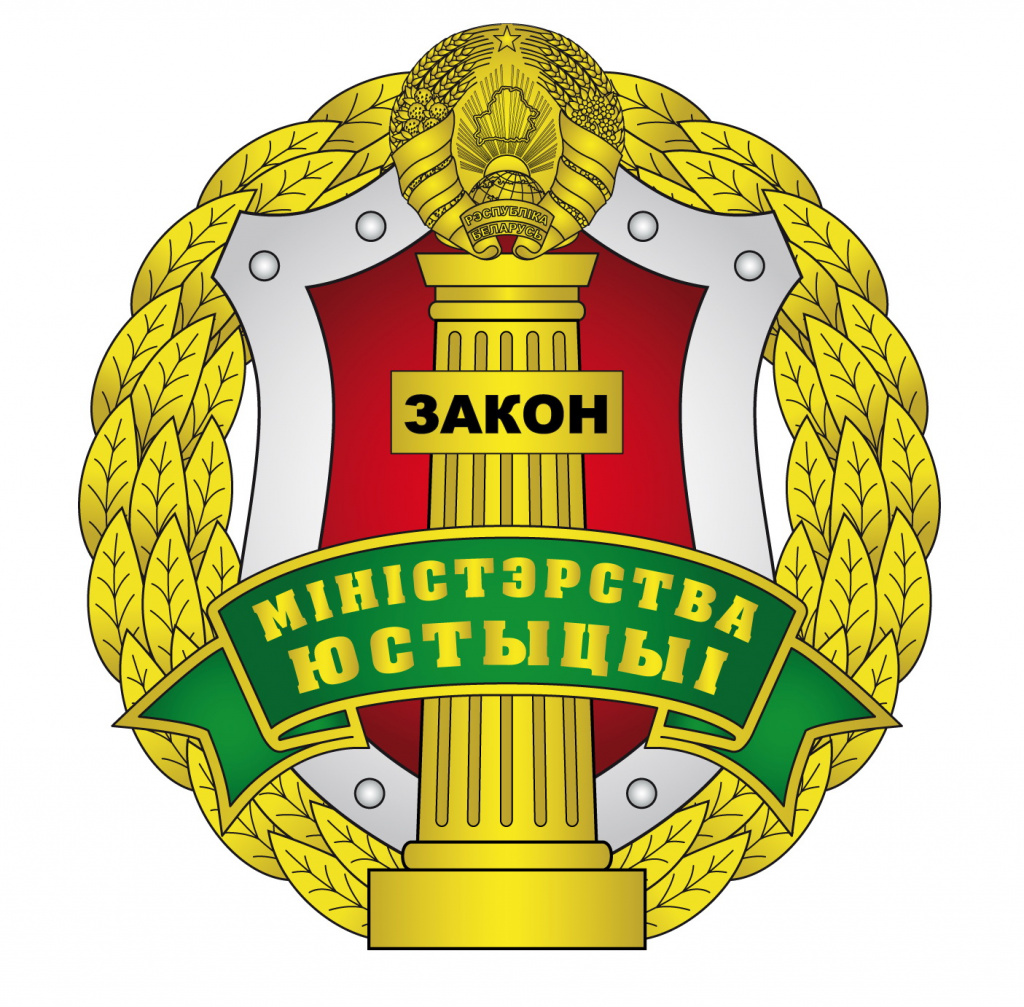

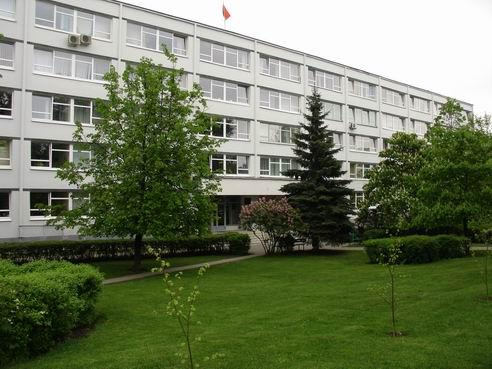

Agency overview
- Formed: 1992; 34 years ago
- Jurisdiction: Government of Belarus
- Headquarters: Miensk, Belarus
- Annual budget: Br 69,400,000 (2024)
- Minister responsible: Yawhyen Kavalyenka, Minister of Justice
- Parent department: Ministry of Justice of the Byelorussian SSR (1946-1992); People's Commissariat of Justice of the BSSR (1946)
- Website: minjust.gov.by

Footnotes
- The Ministry of Justice oversees the Supreme Court of Belarus

The Ministry of Justice of the Republic of Belarus (Belarusian: Міністэрства юстыцыі Рэспублікі Беларусь, Ministerstva justycyi Respubliki Bielaruś) is a Belarusian government agency that is charged with the administering and enforcing the justice system of Belarus.

== Introduction ==
Although a minister of justice existed as early as 1918, it was not until 1946 that The People's Commissariat of Justice of the BSSR was transformed into the Ministry of Justice of the BSSR. The ministry was abolished in 1960 and would not be reestablished until a decade later in 1970. The ministry has existed in some capacity since then.

The ministry was criticized for the double standards to commercial and non-governmental organizations (including political parties). As of 2020, there were 15 parties in Belarus. The last party was registered in 2000, and later the ministry denied to register new parties for different reasons. Belarusian Christian Democracy made 7 attempts to register, Party of freedom and progress — 4 attempts; People's Hramada party was also prevented from registration. The ministry justified all these cases by the reasons that are thought to be artificial and flimsy. For example, the ministry refused to register a local branch of BPF Party in Hrodna Region because of "incorrect line spacing" in the documents. During another attempt to register this branch, the ministry requested the additional documents that are not mentioned in the law. One of the refusals got by the Belarusian Christian Democracy cited lack of home or work phones information for some of the party founders. Another refusal was based on a statement in the party's charter that its members should be "supporters of a Christian worldview". According to the Centre for Legal Transformation, the ministry is also actively refusing to register non-governmental organizations. In 2009, the ministry declared that the registration process was simplified, but the legal experts of political parties doubted this statement claiming that only insignificant issues were affected. In 2012, the ministry started the procedure of suspension of an NGO citing the wrong capital letter on a stamp ("Dobraya Volya" instead of "Dobraya volya") as one of the reasons; the NGO was soon suspended. In 2011 and 2013, the ministry refused to register LGBT organizations; therefore Belarus had no LGBT associations.

The European Union and the United States imposed sanctions against then-current minister of justice Oleg Slizhevsky (Aleh Slizheuski). The United States named Slizhevsky as one of the orchestrators of fraudulent election, the Council of the European Union stated that he's responsible for the misconduct of the 2020 presidential electoral process.

In July and August 2021, the ministry started the procedure of closure of several major NGOs, including Belarusian Popular Front, the oldest continuously operating organization in Belarus (founded in 1988, registered in 1991), Belarusian Association of Journalists, Belarusian PEN centre, World Association of Belarusians.

The ministry is also criticized for expanded intervention in the judicial system.

== List of Leaders ==
=== Ministers of Justice of the Belarusian People's Republic ===
- Yefim Belevich (1918)

=== People's Commissars of the BSSR and the Ministers of Justice ===
- Adolf Getner (1919–1925)
- Moses Segal (1925–1928)
- Alexander Staszewski (1928–1931)
- Maxim Levkov (1931–1932)
- Alexander Sudakov (1932–1933)
- Pavel Kuzmin (1933–1936)
- Roman Kudelsky (1936–1937)
- Sergey Lodysev (1938–1940)

=== Ministers of Justice the BSSR ===
- Ivan Fall (1940–1941; 1942–1953)
- Ivan Winds (1953–1960)
- Gregory Basov (1960–1970)
- Alexander Zdanowicz (1970–1984)
- Yevgeny Abramovich Chkanikav (1984–1986)
- Vladimir Loaf (1986–1988)
- Valentin Sukalo (1988–1989)
- Valery Tikhinya (1989–1991)

=== Ministers of Justice of the Republic of Belarus ===
- Leonid Dashuk (1991–1994)
- Valentin Sukalo (1994–1997)
- Gennady Vorontsov (1997–2001)
- Viktor Golovanov (2001–2011)
- Oleg Slizhevsky (2011–2021)
- Sergei Khomenko (2021–2024)
- Evgeny Kovalenko (since 2024)

== See also ==
- Government of Belarus
- Justice ministry
- Міністры юстыцыі БНР (The Ministers of Justice of the BNR)
- Міністры юстыцыі Рэспублікі Беларусь (The Ministers of Justice of the Republic of Belarus)
- Министерство юстиции Республики Беларусь (Ministry of Justice of the Republic of Belarus)
- Народныя камісары і міністры юстыцыі БССР (The People's Commissars of the BSSR and the Ministers of Justice)
- Politics of Belarus
