= Igor Lyashenko =

Belarusian politician (born 1974)

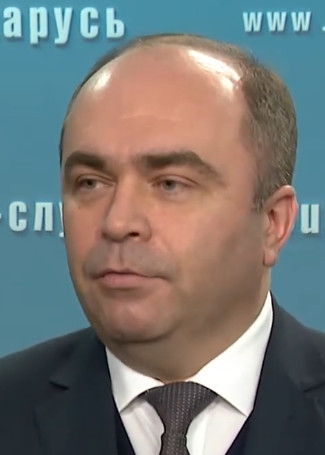
- Lyashenko in 2021

Deputy Prime Minister
- In office 18 August 2018 – 3 March 2020
- President: Alexander Lukashenko
- Prime Minister: Syarhey Rumas
- Preceded by: Vladimir Semashko
- Succeeded by: Yuri Nazarov

Personal details
- Born: 5 November 1974 (age 51)

Igor Vasilyevich Lyashenko (Russian: Игорь Васильевич Ляшенко; born 5 November 1974) is a Belarusian politician and CEO of Grodno Azot since 2021. From 2018 to 2020, he was deputy prime minister.
