= Belorusneft =

Belarusian petrochemical company

- Native name: Белоруснефть
- Industry: Petrochemical industry
- Founded: 1966
- Headquarters: Gomel, Belarus
- Area served: Belarus, Russia, Venezuela, Ecuador
- Key people: Alexander Lyakhov (CEO)
- Products: oil, gas, fuel
- Parent: Belneftehim
- Website: www.belorusneft.by

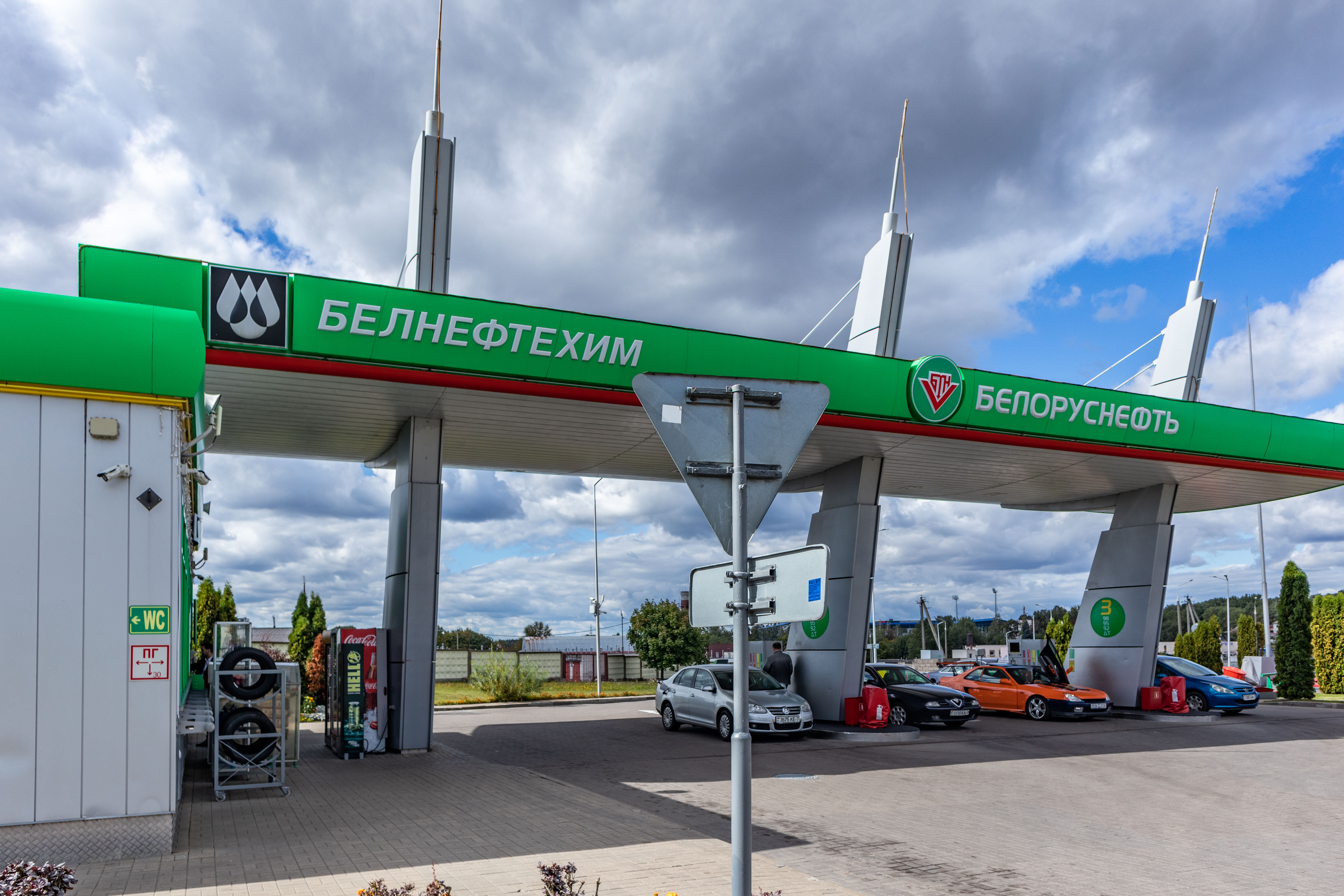
Belorusneft petrol station in Minsk with two logos — Belrusneft and Belneftekhim (September 2021)

Belorusneft (Russian: Государственное производственное объединение «Белоруснефть», Gosudarstvennoje proizvodstvennoje objedienije Belorusneft, Belarusian: Беларуснафта, Belarusnafta) is a company operating in Belarus, which together with its parent company Belneftehim, is responsible for the country's largest network of service stations. According to Belorusneft's own announcement, its distribution network includes more than 500 stations, or 65% of all service stations in Belarus. The company is headquartered in Gomel.

== History ==
Belorusneft is a production company and was established in 1966. In 1980s, Belorusneft engineers and drillers were active in the exploration of the West Siberian petroleum basin in Russian SFSR. In 1986, 5729 workers of Belorusneft worked in Siberia (38.9% of overall number of workers of the organization). After the dissolution of the Soviet Union, the cooperation between Belarusian Belorusneft and Russian government continued.

== Significance ==
Belorusneft activities included exploration and production of natural gas and oil (including abroad), natural gas processing, thermal energy production (Svietlahorsk thermal power plant: electricity generation capacity 21 MW, heat generation capacity 19 Gcal/h) and service station operations.

Belorusneft's fuel distribution stations, for example, are in competition with Russian Lukoil's highway and metropolitan service stations, although they are nowhere near as numerous in number.

In 2011, Belorusneft was sanctioned by the United States Department of State for doing business with Iran.

The company was excluded from the Belneftekhim concern on 16 July 2021. International sanctions imposed on Belneftekhim, including its placement in the Specially Designated Nationals and Blocked Persons List, were suggested to be the reason of the move.

On 2 December 2021, Belorusneft was added to the sanctions list of the European Union. Switzerland joined the EU sanctions on 20 December. In October 2022, Ukraine also blacklisted the company.
