= Drazdy =

District in Minsk, Belarus

Drazdy (Belarusian: Дразды, Russian: Дрозды, romanized: Drozdy) is a microdistrict in north-west Minsk where many top state officials lived during the Soviet times and today, including the President of Belarus, Alexander Lukashenko.

== See also ==
- Drazdy conflict - a 1998 diplomatic incident
