= Leonid Dashuk =

Belarusian lawyer politician

- Леанід Дашук

Minister of Justice
- In office 21 February 1991 – 4 February 1994
- Leader: Stanislav Shushkevich
- Succeeded by: Valentin Sukalo

Personal details
- Born: 22 June 1938 (age 88) Slutsk, Minsk region, Byelorussian SSR, Soviet Union
- Education: Belarusian State University
- Awards: Order of the Badge of Honour

Leonid Andreyevich Dashuk (Russian: Леонид Андреевич Дашук; born 22 June 1938) is a retired Belarusian lawyer who served as the first Minister of Justice of Belarus from 1991 to 1994.

== Early life and education ==
Leonid Dashuk was born on 22 June 1938 in Slutsk, Belarus.

He graduated from Belarusian State University in 1964.

== Career ==
Upon graduation, he worked for around a year as a state investigator in the Barysaw and later Myadzyel districts. In 1965, he was elected as a judge in the Myadzyel court.

In 1967, a mob burned down the court building in Slutsk in response to what they believed was a miscarriage of justice. The crowd was protesting the court's attempt to protect a party worker who had committed murder, and in the process, they killed the head of the court. As a result, Dashuk was appointed as the new head of the Slutsk court in 1968. In 1976, he was promoted to the Supreme Court of the Byelorussian SSR. There, he dealt with criminal cases, including presiding over the trials of former Nazi collaborators.

Dashuk left the court in 1990 and moved to the Ministry of Justice, serving first as its deputy head before becoming its chief on 21 February 1991. As its head, he was formally responsible for suspending the activity of the Byelorussian Communist Party in 1991.

In 1992, while still serving as minister, Dashuk was appointed to the Economic Court of the CIS. After leaving his position in the government on 4 February 1994, he was elected as the court's first chairman. Upon his election, he stated that the court would narrowly focus on economic matters. Dashuk retired in 1997.

After retirement, he remained active as a member of the Belarusian Lawyers' Union and criticized the narrow scope of the Economic Court.

== Awards ==
- Order of the Badge of Honour (Soviet Union)
- Honorary Diploma of the Supreme Soviet (Byelorussian SSR)
- Honored Lawyer (Byelorussian SSR)
