= Belneftekhim =

Belarusian state association of petrochemical companies

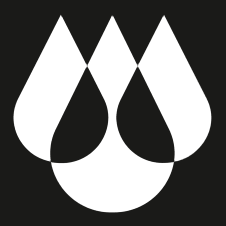

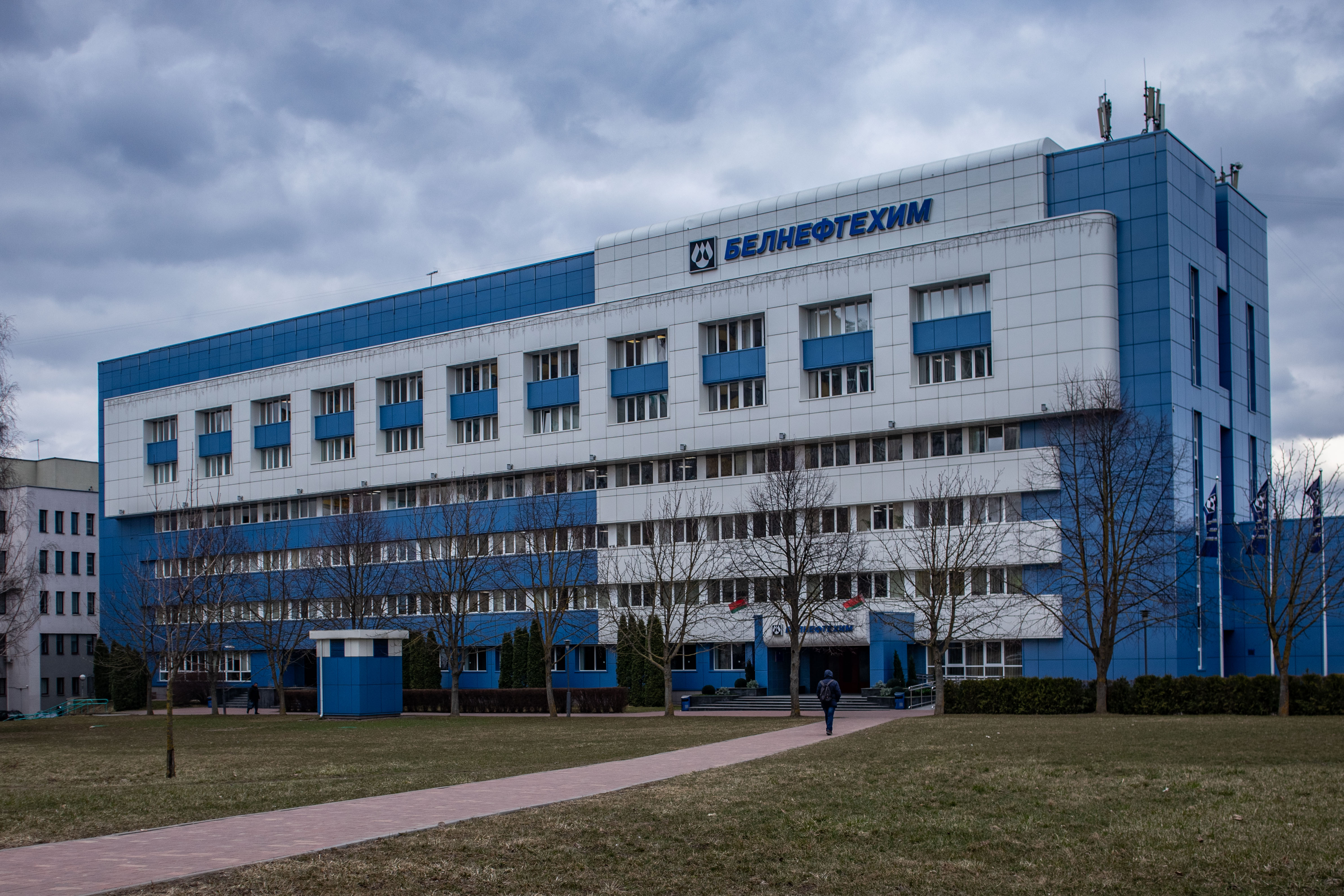
- Belneftekhim headquarters in Minsk
- Type: Concern, management company
- Industry: Petrochemical
- Founded: 1997
- Headquarters: Minsk, Belarus,
- Key people: Ilya Ikan (CEO)
- Revenue: $12.7 billion (2018)
- Net income: 3,095,000,000,000 (2008)
- Website: www.belneftekhim.by

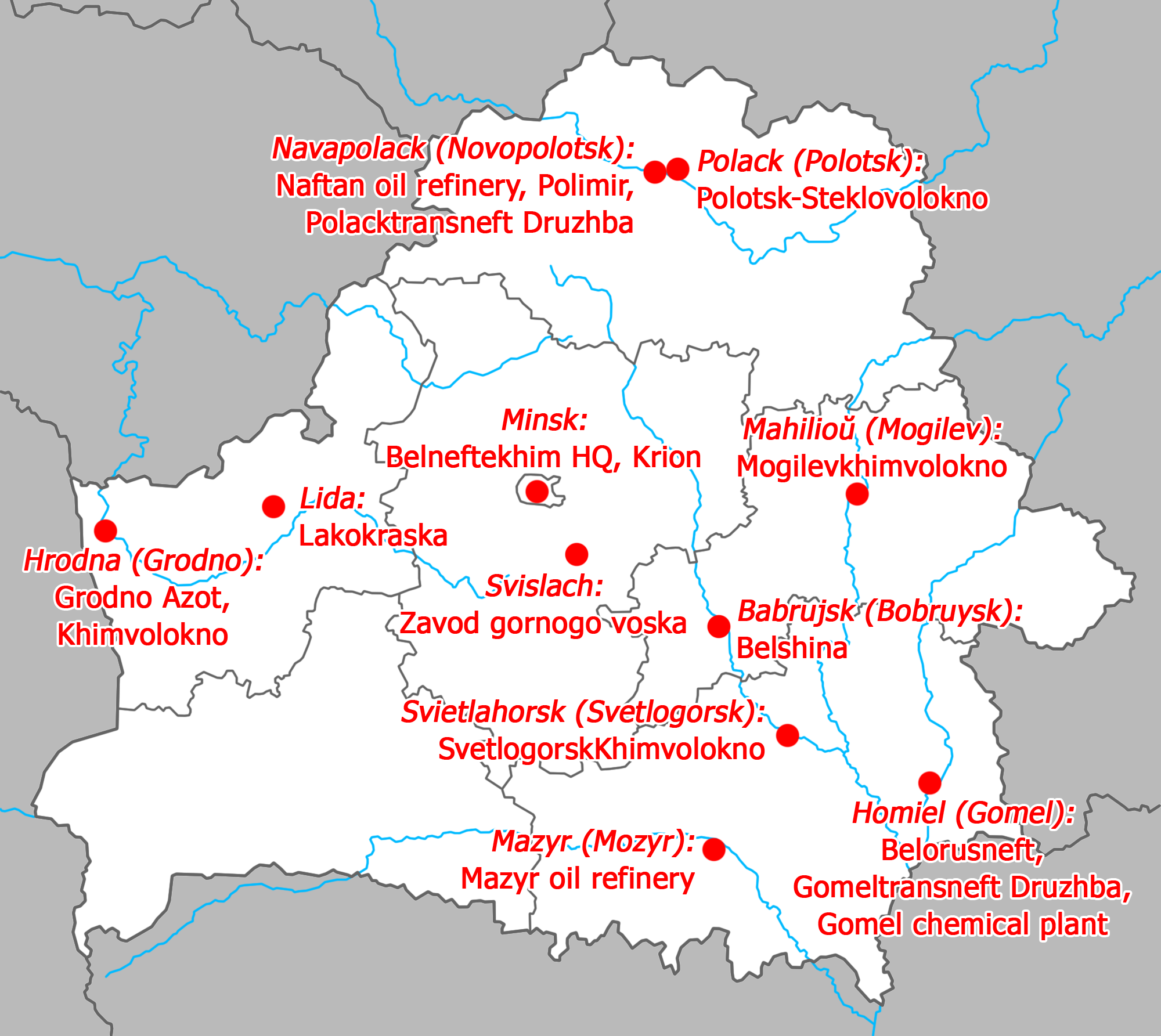
Location of major Belneftekhim companies

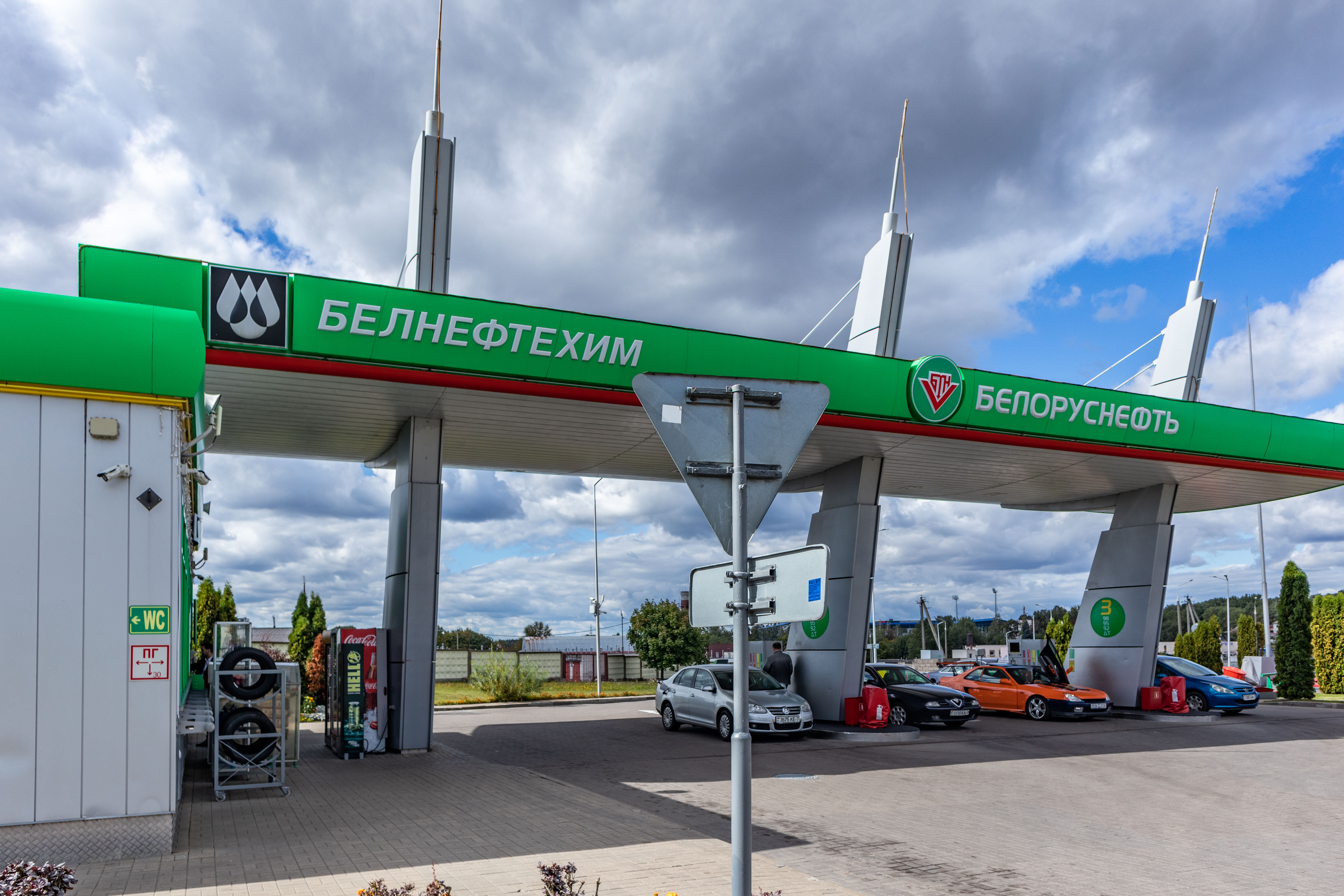
Belorusneft petrol station in Minsk. Note two logos — Belneftekhim and Belorusneft (September 2021)

Belneftekhim or Belnaftahim (full name: Belarusian state concern for oil and chemistry; Russian: Белнефтехим, Белорусский государственный концерн по нефти и химии; Belarusian: Белнафтахім — Беларускі дзяржаўны канцэрн па нафце і хіміі) is an association of petrochemical companies in Belarus, subordinated to the Council of Ministers. It manages these companies and regulates several aspects of the petrochemical sector, including setting retail prices for gasoline.

== Profile ==
Belneftekhim was created in April 1997.

According to the charter issued by the Council of Ministers, Belneftekhim is given powers to manage petrochemical companies of the concern, coordinate and assist their development, set retail prices (including gasoline), give permission for the construction of gas stations and several other rights. Belneftekhim also issues licenses to carry out import and export operations with petroleum products.

In 2019, 70% of petrochemical production (petroleum products and chemical production) was exported, total exports of Belneftekhim companies amounted to US$8 billion.

In January—November 2020, total exports amounted to US$4.2 billion. The companies produced 1.56 million tons of crude oil and processed 14.7 million tons of crude oil.

Belneftekhim's subsidiaries operate 571 of 865 gas stations in Belarus (65%). Due to major market share and right to set fuel prices Belneftekhim is sometimes considered a monopoly in the fuel retail market. In January—March 2021, Belneftekhim raised fuel prices 8 times (+4.3% in total), citing growing oil prices as a reason. Belneftekhim's published justifications of fuel price increases are criticized occasionally.

Belneftekhim companies control the production and local distribution of petroleum products and chemicals, while their export largely relies on companies owned by businessmen who are close to Alexander Lukashenko (oligarchs). In 2000s and early 2010s, Yury Chyzh (companies Trayplenergo/Triple-Energo, Neonafta, Belneftegaz) and Anatoly Ternavsky (Univest-M) owned major companies involved in importing raw petroleum from Russia and exporting the finished goods to the EU and Ukraine. In 2012, after the EU imposed sanctions on Chyzh and Ternavsky for sponsoring Lukashenko's regime, an Interservis (Интерсервис) company owned by Chyzh's associate Mikalai Varabei replaced some of the sanctioned companies. Another Chyzh's associate Aliaksei Aleksin got ownership of many Chyzh's assets, renaming it to Energo-Oil and resuming foreign operations. At the same time, state-owned CJSC Belarusian Oil Company or BNK (Russian: Белорусская Нефтяная Компания, БНК) controlled by Belneftekhim also exported petroleum products to the EU, UK and Ukraine. In 2021, Office of Financial Sanctions Implementation of the British HM Treasury stated: "There are reasonable grounds to suspect that BNK (UK) Ltd Company is controlled directly or indirectly by the President of Belarus, Alexander Lukashenko". In 2020, CJSC New Oil Company or NNK (Russian: Новая Нефтяная Компания, ННК, 75% are allegedly owned by Varabei's Interservis) started operations in Belarus with Belneftekhim's approval, and in August 2021 it was listed among the top-10 companies paying the most taxes to the budget of Minsk.

== International sanctions ==
Belneftekhim has been subject to United States sanctions following waves of political repressions and human rights abuse by the regime of Alexander Lukashenko in Belarus.

In 2007, the U.S. Treasury has imposed sanctions against Belneftekhim and its affiliated companies because of the conglomerate "being controlled by oppressive Belarusian president Alexander Lukashenko". On 13 November 2007, the United States issued sanctions on Belneftekhim for violating human rights by Alexander Lukashenko during and after 2006 Belarusian presidential election. The sanctions included asset freeze and a ban on U.S. persons transacting or doing business with Belneftekhim.

In 2011, following the violent crackdown of opposition protests after the falsified 2010 Belarusian presidential election, U.S. citizens were prohibited from doing business with several companies of the Belneftekhim conglomerate: Naftan oil refinery, Grodno Azot fertilizer manufacturer, Grodno Khimvolokno fiber manufacturer and Belshina tire factory.

Belneftekhim was additionally sanctioned for making several deals with Iran. In 2011, Belneftekhim's company Belorusneft was sanctioned by the United States Department of State for doing business with Iran. In 2017, three USA states listed Belneftekhim in their lists of companies doing business with the Iranian Petroleum/Natural Gas, Nuclear and Military Sectors. Belneftekhim is also active in Ecuador, Indonesia, Russia and Venezuela.

The sanctions against Belneftekhim were temporarily suspended in 2015.

In April 2021, full-scale sanctions against Belneftekhim as an entry in the Specially Designated Nationals and Blocked Persons List were renewed following brutal political repressions against the opposition after another rigged presidential election that took place in August 2020 and was accompanied by mass protests across Belarus. On 9 August 2021, the US has added Belneftekhim CEO Andrei Rybakov to the SDN list.

In 2022, Canada and Ukraine also imposed sanctions on Belneftekhim.

In August 2023, the concern was blacklisted by of the European Union. In the same month, Switzerland, North Macedonia, Montenegro, Albania, Ukraine, Bosnia and Herzegovina, Iceland, Liechtenstein and Norway joined these sanctions.

== Labour rights issues, political repressions ==
In August 2020, groups of workers at Belneftekhim-controlled companies Naftan and Grodno Azot participated in nationwide protests against Alexander Lukashenko following a rigged presidential election.

In October 2020, several hundreds of workers at Grodno Azot, a company of Belneftekhim, have participated in the strike as part of nationwide protests. Company management has threatened striking workers, fired them and replaced them with Strikebreakers from other Belneftekhim companies. Several protesting workers were arrested.

At Naftan, workers have collected over three thousand signatures and held protests demanding resignation of Alexander Lukashenko and new presidential elections A strike was called off after threats and intimidation of workers by company management.

On 14 August 2020, Belneftekhim stated that employees of 4 member companies (Naftan, Grodno Azot, Mogilevkhimvolokno and Khimvolokno in Grodno) had special meetings with the management discussing non-economic issues without stopping the factories.

In September 2021, several Grodno Azot workers were detained. Their detention was connected with the threat of Alexander Lukashenko that workers who reveal the ways of bypassing the sanctions would be put in jail for a long time.

== Companies ==
On 28 February 2014, state-owned fertilizer producer Belaruskali was excluded from Belneftekhim.

As of March 2021, Belneftekhim consisted of 20 companies:

- CJSC Belneftestrakh (Белнефтестрах) — insurance
- State production association Belorusneft (Белоруснефть) — oil production; the company was excluded from Belneftekhim on 16 July 2021. Western sanctions were suggested to be the reason of the exclusion.
- State unitary enterprise Belorusneft—Minskavtozapravka (Белоруснефть-Минскавтозаправка) — gas stations
- Unitary enterprise Belarusian oil trading house (Белорусский нефтяной Торговый Дом) — wholesale trade
- OJSC Belshina (Белшина) — tires
- OJSC Gomel chemical plant (Belfert; Гомельский химический завод) — phosphate fertilizers, sulphuric acid, oleum
- OJSC Gomeltransneft Druzhba (Гомельтранснефть «Дружба) — operator of Belarusian segment of oil pipeline Druzhba
- OJSC Grodno scientific, research and project institute of nitrogen industry and organic synthesis products
- OJSC Grodno Azot (Гродно Азот) — nitrogen fertilizers
- OJSC Zavod gornogo voska (Завод горного воска) — mineral wax plant
- Polimir branch of OJSC Naftan (Завод Полимир) — chemical plant
- OJSC Krion (Крион) — oxygen, argon, other gases
- OJSC Lakokraska (Лакокраска) — paints and varnishes
- OJSC Mozyr Oil Refinery (Мозырский нефтеперерабатывающий завод) — oil refinery
- OJSC Naftan (Нафтан) — oil refinery
- OJSC Polotsk-Steklovolokno (Полоцк-Стекловолокно) — fiberglass
- OJSC SvetlogorskKhimvolokno (СветлогорскХимволокно) — synthetic fibers
- Khimvolokno branch of OJSC Grodno Azot — synthetic fibers
- Novopolotsk branch of OJSC Gomeltransneft Druzhba — operator of Belarusian segment of Unecha—Polotsk—Ventspils pipeline
