= Viktor Golovanov (born 1952) =

Belarusian lawyer and politician

- Віктар Галаванаў

Minister of Justice of Belarus
- In office 1 October 2001 – 4 October 2011
- President: Alexander Lukashenko
- Preceded by: Gennady Vorontsov
- Succeeded by: Oleg Slizhevsky

Personal details
- Born: 15 December 1952 (age 73) Barysaw, Minsk region, Byelorussian SSR, Soviet Union
- Education: Belarusian State University

Viktor Grigoryevich Golovanov (Russian: Голованов Виктор Григорьевич; born 15 December 1952) is a lawyer who served as the Minister of Justice of Belarus from 2001 to 2011.

== Early life and education ==
Viktor Golovanov was born on 15 December 1952, in Barysaw, Minsk region, to a military family.

In 1979, he graduated with a law degree from Belarusian State University. In 1991, he obtained a political science degree from the Minsk Higher Party School, an educational institution that prepared communist party workers. Golovanov holds a PhD in law.

== Career ==
=== Early years, 1969–2001 ===
Golovanov started his career as a metalworker at a factory in Bobruisk in 1969 and served in the Red Army from 1971 to 1973.

Upon graduating from Belarusian State University in 1979, he briefly worked as a lawyer in Mogilev before switching to party work the next year. He rose to the position of instructor at the Mogilev regional committee. In 1987, he chaired its legal department. The following year, he was promoted to the Central Party apparatus, working at the Central Committee and the Ministry of Justice of Belarus.

From 1992, Golovanov worked as a deputy head of the Belarusian Patent Bureau. After practicing as a lawyer in Minsk from 1995 to 1996, he returned to the Ministry of Justice as a deputy minister. He then moved to the Presidential administration, where he served from 2000 to 2001.

=== Minister of Justice, 2001–2011 ===
Belarusian President Alexander Lukashenko appointed him Minister of Justice on 1 October 2001.

During his tenure, Golovanov closed the human rights center Viasna and threatened to do the same with the independent pollster IISEPI. He lobbied the Belarusian parliament to pass legislation that would make the closure of civil organizations easier, and he passed a decree prohibiting the activity of unregistered organizations. On the other hand, he supported the creation of state-backed civil society institutions.

In 2009, Golovanov considered easing some restrictions to improve relations with the EU. Prior to the 2010 elections, he urged people not to participate in protests and threatened to ban parties that supported anti-Lukashenko rallies. Responding to critics, Golovanov said that he just followed the law and did not have the goal to specifically close any NGO. During his ten years, no new political parties were registered.

Commenting on the Union State with Russia, Golovanov said that it cannot trample the Belarusian Constitution, but at the same time Russians shouldn't feel like foreigners in Belarus. In 2009, the Ministry of Justice initiated a campaign to urge Russians to change the naming of the country from "Byelorussia" to "Belarus"; similar complaints were put forward towards Lithuania. In 2010, he initiated a court case against Russia in the CIS economic court over tariffs. Following presidential elections in the same year, Russia urged Belarus to take it back, which Belarus did.

Golovanov supported a ban on the public display of fascist symbols and lobbied for legislation to protect Belarusians living abroad. He supported the death penalty on the grounds that it was backed by public opinion. Prior to his dismissal, he wanted to make changes to the law regulating Belarusian lawyers, which the lawyers opposed. Golovanov said that during his tenure, it became easier to conduct business in Belarus and that courts started to consider cases faster, exceeding time limits in only 2% of all cases, a drop from 20% previously.

In 2007, Golovanov was appointed head of the Belarusian Table Tennis Federation. It is unclear when he was dismissed.

=== Dismissal and later years, 2011– ===
Golovanov was dismissed on 4 October 2011, without cause being officially stated. The opposition newspaper Nasha Niva claimed the dismissal was related to corruption. After that, he became a rector at the private Belarusian Institute of Law.

== Sanctions ==
In 2005, Golovanov was barred entrance into Poland for the repression against Union of Poles of Belarus. Following the 2006 Belarusian presidential election, Golovanov was sanctioned by the EU and the US. The EU lifted sanctions in 2008, reintroduced them in 2011, and lifted them again in 2015. US President Donald Trump reaffirmed the sanctions in 2025.

== Personal life ==
Golovanov is married and has two children.

== Awards ==
- Medal "For Labor Merits" (Belarus)
