= Vysheysha shkola =

Vysheysha shkola (Belarusian: Вышэйшая школа) is a state-owned publishing house in Minsk, Belarus, specialized in publishing academic books.
