= BelMarket =

Supermarket chain in Belarus

BelMarket (БелМаркет)
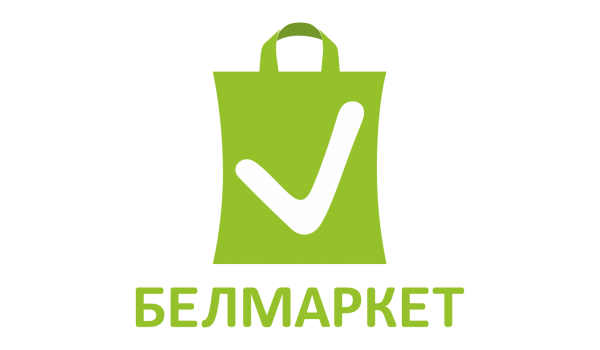
- Company type: Private company
- Industry: Retail, General merchandise
- Founded: Minsk, 2007
- Headquarters: Minsk, Belarus
- Key people: Aleksei Shavrov
- Products: groceries, consumer goods
- Website: http://www.bel-market.by
- Footnotes / references Annual Retail Turnover estimation $76m

BelMarket (БелМаркет) is a chain of supermarkets in Belarus. It is the first national food chain in that country. BelMarket was started as a project by Russian companies X5 Retail Group and A1 in 2007.
