= Aliasworlds Entertainment =

Belarusian video game developer

Aliasworlds
- Company type: Private
- Industry: Video games
- Founded: Minsk (2001)
- Products: Casual game
- Website: aliasworlds.com

Aliasworlds Entertainment is a casual game developer based in Minsk, Belarus. The company was founded in 2001 and released its first game, Gold Sprinter, in 2002.

== Games developed ==
=== Snowy game series ===
Aliasworlds Entertainment is known for the "Snowy", also known as "Milky Bear" series of games that star Snowy the white polar bear. Much like Nintendo's Super Mario Bros. franchise, Snowy appears in games that span a variety of different genres including restaurant management and side-scrolling platformer. The "Snowy" game series is published by Alawar Entertainment.

- Snowy: The Bear's Adventures (2003, PS3, PSP and PS Vita version released in 2011)
- Snowy: Puzzle Islands (2004)
- Snowy: Space Trip (2004)
- Snowy: Treasure Hunter (2005, PS3 version released in 2014)
- Snowy: Fish Frenzy (2005)
- Snowy: Treasure Hunter 2 (2006)
- Snowy: Lunch Rush (2006)
- Snowy: Treasure Hunter 3 (2007)
- Lunch Rush HD (2013)

=== Other games ===
- Gold Sprinter (Alawar Entertainment) (2002)
- Turbo Pizza (Oberon Media) (2007)
- The Apprentice Los Angeles (Legacy Interactive) (2007)
- Turbo Subs (Oberon Media) (2008)
- Cooking Dash (PlayFirst) (2008)
- Turbo Fiesta (Oberon Media) (2008)
- Ranch Rush (FreshGames) (2008)
- Cooking Dash: Dinertown Studios (PlayFirst) (2009)
- Gemini Lost (PlayFirst) (2009)
- The Fifth Gate (PlayFirst) (2010)
- Ranch Rush 2 (FreshGames) (2010)
- Cooking Dash 3: Thrills and Spills (PlayFirst) (2010)
- My Farm Life (Alawar Entertainment) (2011)
- My Farm Life 2 (Alawar Entertainment) (2011)
- Kingdom Chronicles (2012)
- Solitaire Perfect Match (2014)
- Kingdom Chronicles 2 (2015)
- Jigsaw Puzzle Club (2017)
