= Credexbank =

Stock company based in the Republic of Belarus

JSC CredexBank
- Type: Joint stock company
- Industry: Banking
- Predecessor: as Nordic Investment Bank Corporation, the bank changed its name to Northern Investment Bank on April 5, 2006
- Founded: Minsk, Belarus(October 27, 2001)
- Founder: Ximex Executive company
- Defunct: 9 October 2017
- Headquarters: Belarus
- Key people: Alexander A. Aksenevich
- Total assets: Br 334.9 billion (US$41.2 million)
- Number of employees: 169
- Parent: Vicpart Holding SA

JSC CredexBank is a joint stock company, also shortened as Credex, a bank located in the Republic of Belarus primarily servicing corporate entities.

== History and operations ==
Originally established on September 27, 2001, as Nordic Investment Bank Corporation, the bank changed its name to Northern Investment Bank on April 5, 2006, and then to the current name of JSC CredexBank on February 12, 2007. The original banking license was issued on September 27, 2001. The banking licence no. 19 was issued on November 9, 2011. It is a member of Association of the Belarusian Banks, which was founded in 1990. It was established in 2001 by British investors, Ximex Executive. Credexbank is the 22nd largest of Belarus's 31 commercial banks by assets. It is owned by the Fribourg, Switzerland-based company Vicpart Holding SA, owns 98,82% of the bank's shares. Another shareholder is Sentecinvest (1,18%). Credexbank's beneficial owner is Michel Haessing (Switzerland).

With 169 employees and a total capitalization of approximately US$19 million, the bank currently ranks as the 22nd largest in total assets among 31 commercial banks in Belarus. Credex has six domestic branches and one representative office in the Czech Republic. While the majority of its correspondent banking relationships are with other Belarusian banks, Credex also maintains correspondent relationships with Russian, Latvian, German, and Austrian banks.

The statutory capital of Credexbank is Br 150.4 billion (US$18.5 million according to the current rate). As of 1 April 2012, the bank's assets equaled Br 334.9 billion ($41.2 million).

== Foreign investments between Belarus and off-shores ==
Credexbank said in 2012 that Belarusian residents regularly carry out export-import and investment transactions with non-residents of the international offshore areas, however their volume was insignificant.

== Officers ==
As of June 15, 2012, the chairperson of the bank was Alexander A. Aksenevich. Ekaterina Lazareva was associated with this bank as a "leading specialist at JSC Credexbank."

== Locations ==
The address of the bank headquarters is 114 Nekrasova Street, Minsk, 220068.

== Legal difficulties ==
=== United States allegation ===
On May 22, 2012, the United States Department of the Treasury announced the identification of Belarus-based JSC CredexBank (Credex) as a financial institution of primary money laundering concern under the USA PATRIOT Act (Section 311). The U.S. Government took this action because it has reason to believe that Credex has engaged in high volumes of transactions that are indicative of money laundering on behalf of shell corporations, and has a history of ownership by shell corporations whose own lack of transparency contributes to considerable uncertainty surrounding Credex's true beneficial ownership.

=== Credexbank response ===
On May 25, 2012, Credexbank JSC issued a press release "that assertions of the United States Department of the Treasury regarding transactions carried out by the Bank and the possibility itself for a small Belarusian bank to act as a “key center for money laundering” are groundless." Credexbank reports that "An audit for the observance of measures by the Bank aimed at combating money laundering and financing of terrorism has been also carried out by the respective state authorities" such as the State Control Committee of the Republic of Belarus and the National Bank of the Republic of Belarus. Credexbank JSC announced that it is " consulting with their lawyers in Switzerland in order to protect business reputation" and "to prove the noninvolvement of Credexbank JSC in illegal business and eliminate any doubts about reliability of the bank".

=== Belarusian Foreign Ministry response ===
Foreign Ministry spokesman Andrei Savinykh of the Belarusian Foreign Ministry has dismissed the allegations of the United States, accusing Credexbank, a Belarusian bank, of money laundering.

=== National Bank of Belarus investigation ===
On June 23, 2012, the first deputy chairman of the Board of the National Bank of Belrussia Mikalay Luzgin said, presently the National Bank is verifying the data obtained from the US Department of the Treasury. Mikalay Luzgin is in charge of the bank surveillance.

Later, in response to the money laundering allegations, the National Bank of Belarus conducted an unscheduled inspection of Credexbank and did not find evidence of impropriety.

The National Bank of Belarus announced that,

"In the course of the audit it was once again proved that Credexbank rules and procedures of internal control to prevent the legalization of proceeds from crime and terrorist financing were largely consistent with both the requirements of legislation of the Republic of Belarus and the FATF standards (FATF - Financial Action Task Force on Money Laundering - an intergovernmental organization that sets standards and develops policies to combat "money laundering" and financing terrorism)."

"However, in order to minimize the risk of further information that could cause substantial harm to the Belarusian banks’ reputation, the National Bank of Belarus intends to initiate the preparation of a draft legal act, enabling the Belarusian banks to sever relations with dubious clients, cooperation with which can lead to undesirable consequences," the National Bank noted.
