= Supreme Court of Belarus =

National supreme court

Supreme Court of the Republic of Belarus
- Вярхоўны суд Рэспублікі Беларусь; Верховный Суд Республики Беларусь
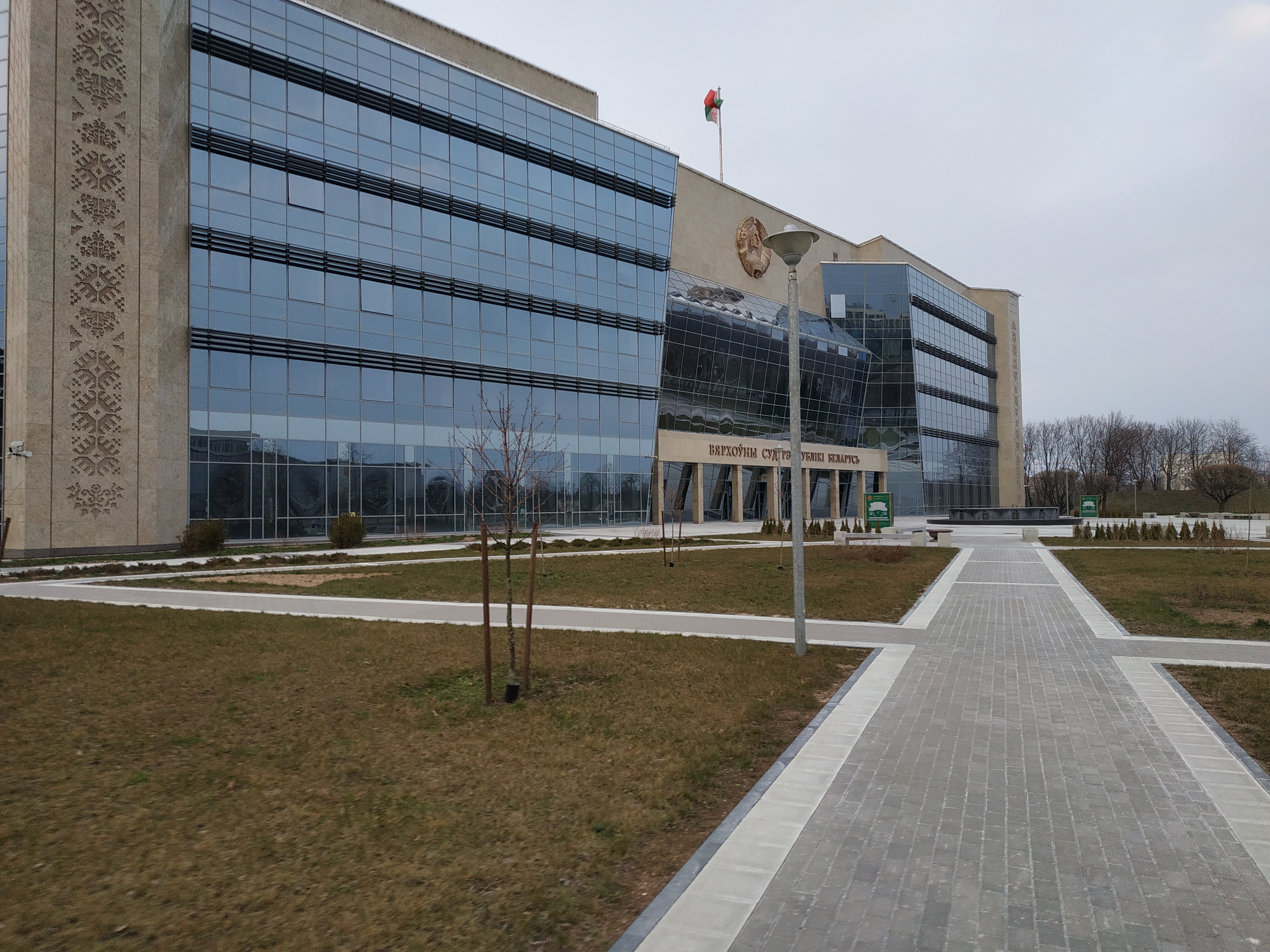
- The building of the Supreme Court of the Republic of Belarus
- Interactive map of Supreme Court of the Republic of Belarus
- Established: 1991
- Jurisdiction: Belarus
- Location: Minsk, Belarus
- Authorised by: Ministry of Justice of the Republic of Belarus
- Website: Official site

Chairman of the Supreme Court
- Currently: Valentin Sukalo
- Since: January 1997

The Supreme Court of the Republic of Belarus is the highest-tier court inside of Belarus and acts as the final "court of review." Its general tasks include the oversight of lower-tier courts and it can render justice in areas of general civil and criminal law. As with many European nations, constitutional review is beyond the jurisdiction of the Belarusian Supreme Court, with such cases sent to a separate court called the Constitutional Court. Unlike other European nations however, the Belarusian political apparatus prevents meaningful independence in the judiciary, and neither the Constitutional Court or Supreme Court are known to challenge the dictatorship of Alexander Lukashenko. The judges to the Supreme Court are appointed by the president.

== History ==
On 1 January 2014, the Supreme Economic Court of Belarus merged with the Supreme Court.
