= Mozyr Oil Refinery =

Oil refinery in Mazyr, Belarus

Mazyr Oil Refinery
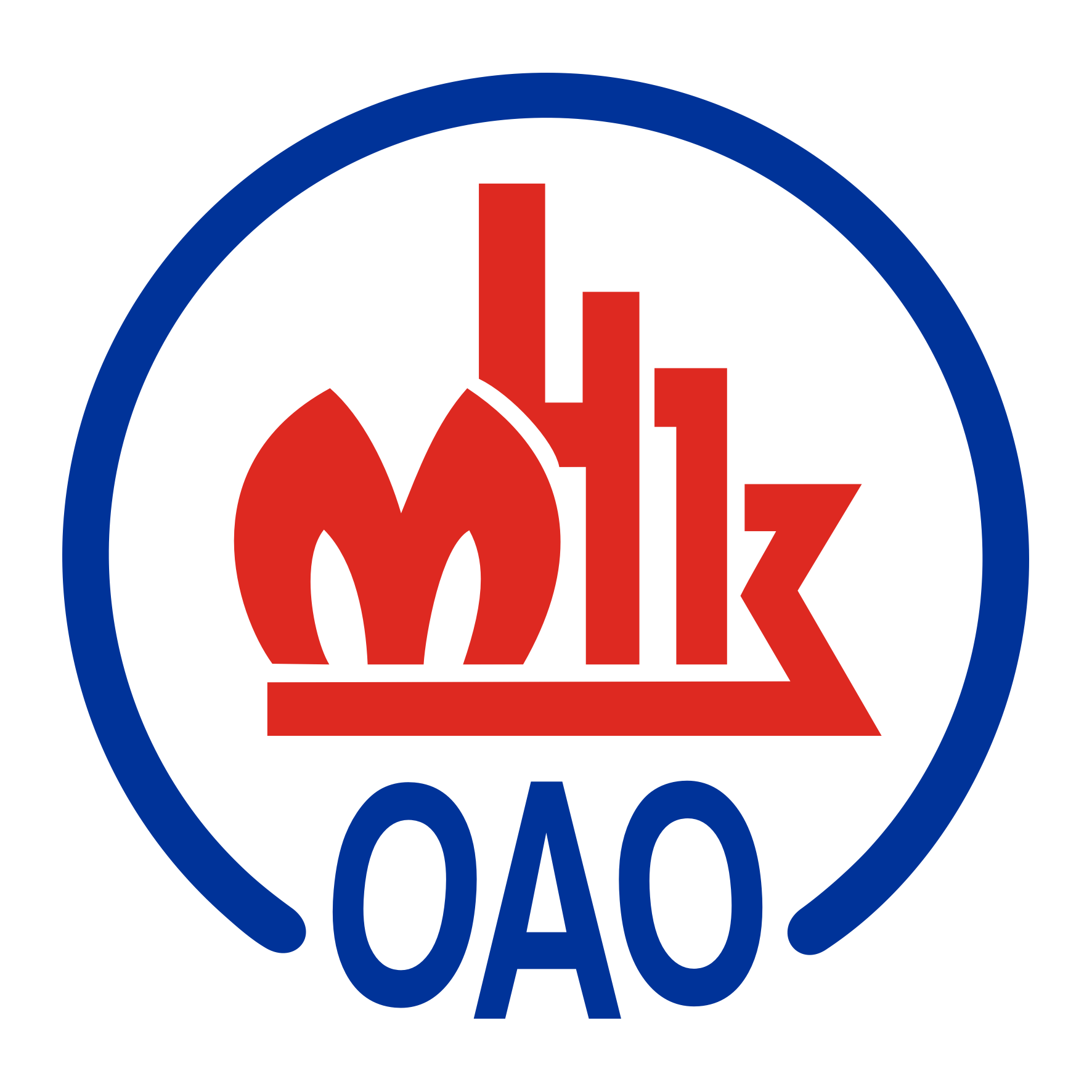
- Native name: Мазырскі нафтаперапрацоўчы завод
- Romanized name: Mazyrski naftapierapracoŭčy zavod
- Type: open joint-stock company
- Industry: petrochemical industry
- Founded: 30 January 1975
- Headquarters: Mićki, Belarus
- Area served: Belarus, Russia
- Key people: Vital Pawlaw (CEO), Siargiey Gramovich (CTO)
- Products: gasoline, diesel fuel, heating oil, bitumen, LPG, MTBE, kerosene, sulfur, benzene, gas oil
- Revenue: 6,658,717,000 Belarusian ruble (2020)
- Operating income: 395,257,000 Belarusian ruble (2020)
- Net income: 327,420,000 Belarusian ruble (2020)
- Total assets: 5,353,422,000 Belarusian ruble (2020)
- Owner: State Committee on Property of Belarus (43%), Slavneft (42%)
- Number of employees: 4,641 (2015)
- Parent: State Committee on Property of Belarus
- Website: mnpz.by/en/

Mazyr Oil Refinery (Belarusian: Мазырскі нафтаперапрацоўчы завод; Mozyr Oil Refinery, Russian: Мозырский нефтеперерабатывающий завод) is an oil refinery in Belarus, founded in 1975 in Mazyr district (Gomel region) near the village of Mitski. It is one of the two Belarusian refineries, the other being Naftan Oil Refinery, in the city of Navapolatsk.

As of May 2022, Mazyr Oil Refinery processes 13,700 tonnes of oil per day.

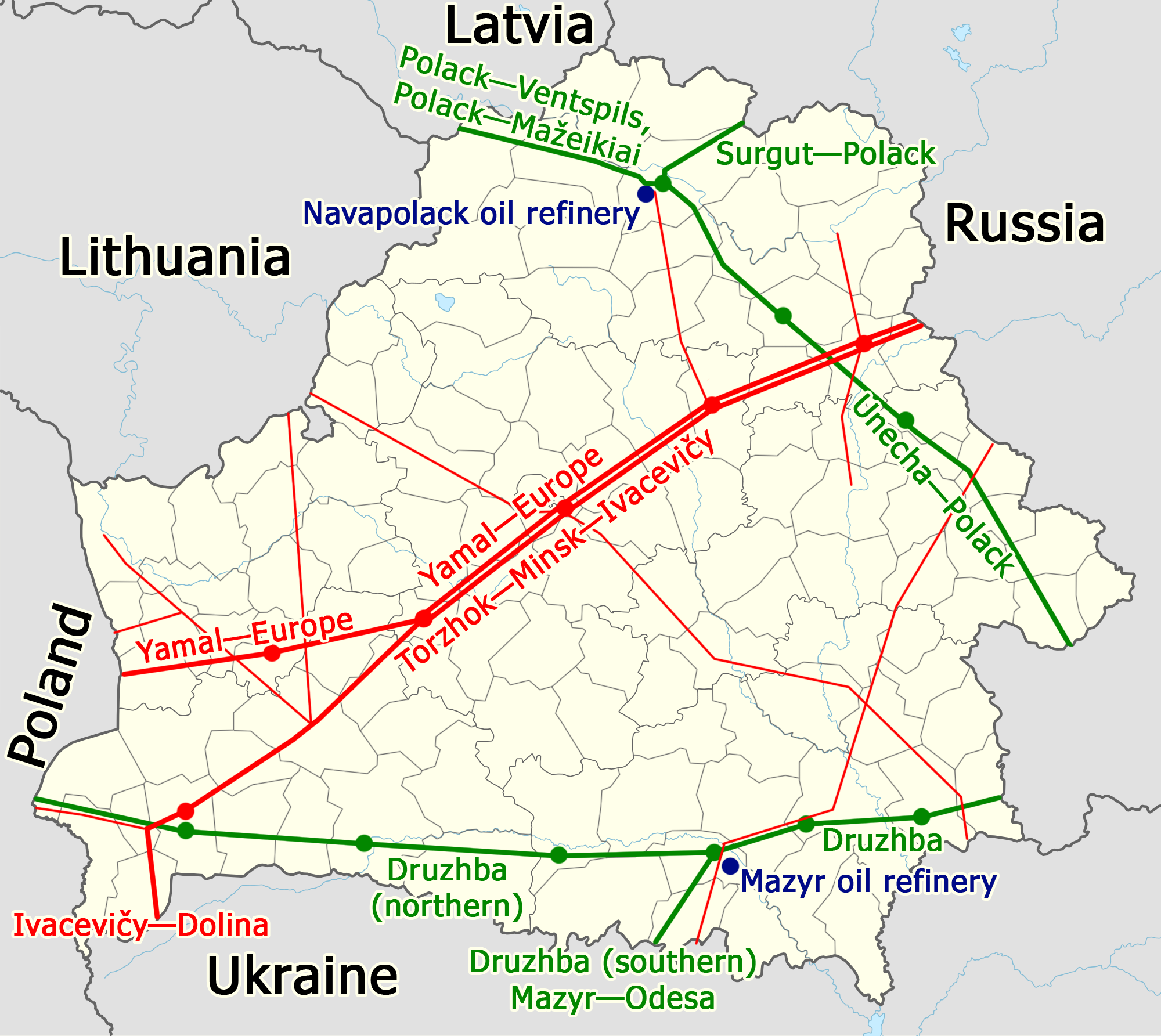
Mazyr oil refinery and pipelines in Belarus

In October 2022, Ukraine imposed sanctions on Mozyr Oil Refinery.
