= Grodno Azot =

Belarusian fertilizer company

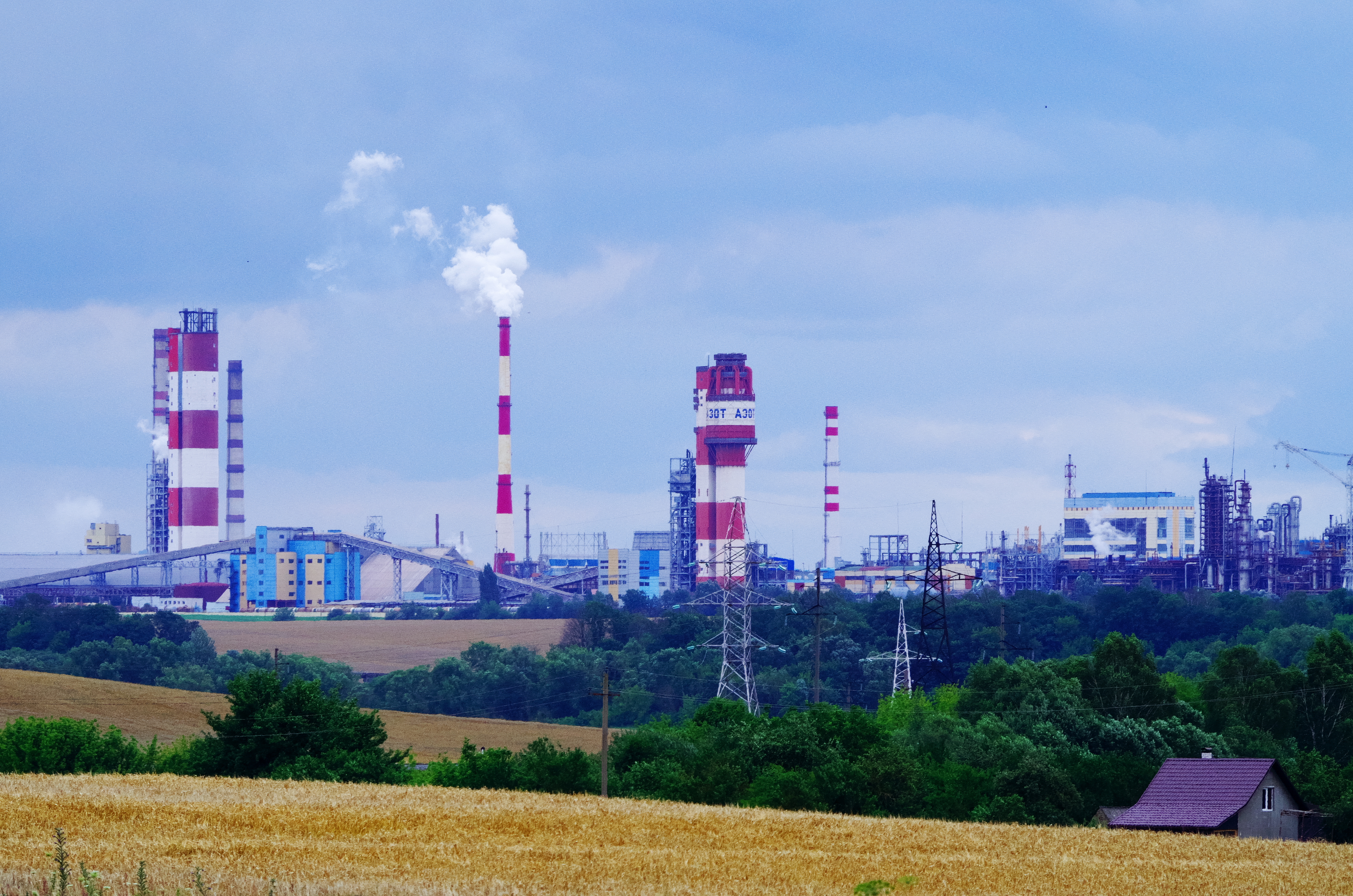
- Industry: Chemical
- Founded: 1965
- Headquarters: 100 Kosmonavtov Avenue, Grodno, Belarus
- Key people: Igor Lyashenko (CEO)
- Products: Nitrogen, ammonia, methanol, fertilisers, cleaning, washing, and protective agents
- Number of employees: 7,562 (2016)
- Website: www.azot.by

Grodno Azot (Belarusian «Гро́дна Азо́т») is an open joint-stock company, Belarusian state-run producer of nitrogen compounds and fertilizers located in Grodno, Belarus.

== History ==
The construction of temporary auxiliary facilities started in October 1960. In January 1965, the first lines of Ammiak-1 and Karbamid-1 workshops were put in operation. In October 1970, Grodno Nitrogen and Fertiliser Plant was transformed into Grodno Chemicals Plant named after Siarhei Prytytski. In May 1975, it was transformed into Grodno Production Association Azot named after Siarhei Prytytski.

In August 2000, the association was changed into a unitary enterprise and in 2002 it became OJSC Grodno Azot.

Grodno Azot and Khimvolokno are the main supplier of polyamide technical thread from the EAEU to Russia, where it is used for the production of body armor.

== Sanctions ==
In 2006, the United States imposed sanctions against nine Belarusian companies including Grodno Azot and its affiliate Grodno Khimvolokno for "undermining the democratic process”. In October 2015, the sanctions were partially lifted.

After the falsified Belarusian Presidential elections on August 9, 2020, Grodno Azot workers joined the opposition protests and national strike; however, many were detained and beaten by the police on multiple occasions.

In 2021, the United States reported that the sanctions against Grodno Azot can be renewed. On 30 March 2021, Grodno Azot's subsidiary announced a tender for the shipment of its goods. One of the terms of the tender was the possibility of not marking the affiliation of the cargo with the Grodno Azot. It was caused by the threat of sanctions, according to the tender documentation and media.

In April 2021, full-scale US sanctions against Grodno Azot and Grodno Khimvolokno were renewed. On 9 August 2021, the US has added Grodno Azot CEO Igor Lyashenko to the SDN list.

In September 2021, several Grodno Azot workers were detained. New arrests were associated with the threat of Alexander Lukashenko that workers who reveal the ways of bypassing the sanctions would be put in jail for a long time.

In December 2021, European Union sanctioned Grodno Azot and Grodno Khimvolokno. Switzerland joined the EU sanctions on December 20.

In 2022, Japan and Ukraine joined the sanctions against Grodno Azot.

In 2023, several sanctions circumvention schemes involving companies registered in Kyrgyzstan, Uzbekistan, Serbia and Lithuania were identified as a result of journalistic investigations by the Belarusian Investigative Center and Siena. In October 2024, it was reported that Grodno Azot products were being supplied to Ukraine under the guise of being produced in Turkmenistan through a company registered in the United Arab Emirates. In the summer of 2025, two more investigations were published on the circumvention of sanctions against Grodno Azot using companies registered in Kazakhstan, Turkmenistan, Poland and the UAE.

On February 21, 2024, the Court of Justice of the European Union in Luxembourg rejected the claim of Grodno Azot and its subsidiary Khimvolokno, which had demanded the lifting of the European sanctions.

== See also ==
- Economy of Belarus
- Belneftekhim

== Bibliography ==
- Официальный сайт
- Гродненское производственное объединение «Азот» им. С. О. Притыцкого
- Завершено объединение «Гродно Азота» и «Гродно Химволокно»
- Belarus: Amid vicious crackdown on peaceful protesters, authorities arrest workers planning strike
