= Naftan Oil Refinery =

Oil refinery in Novopolotsk, Belarus

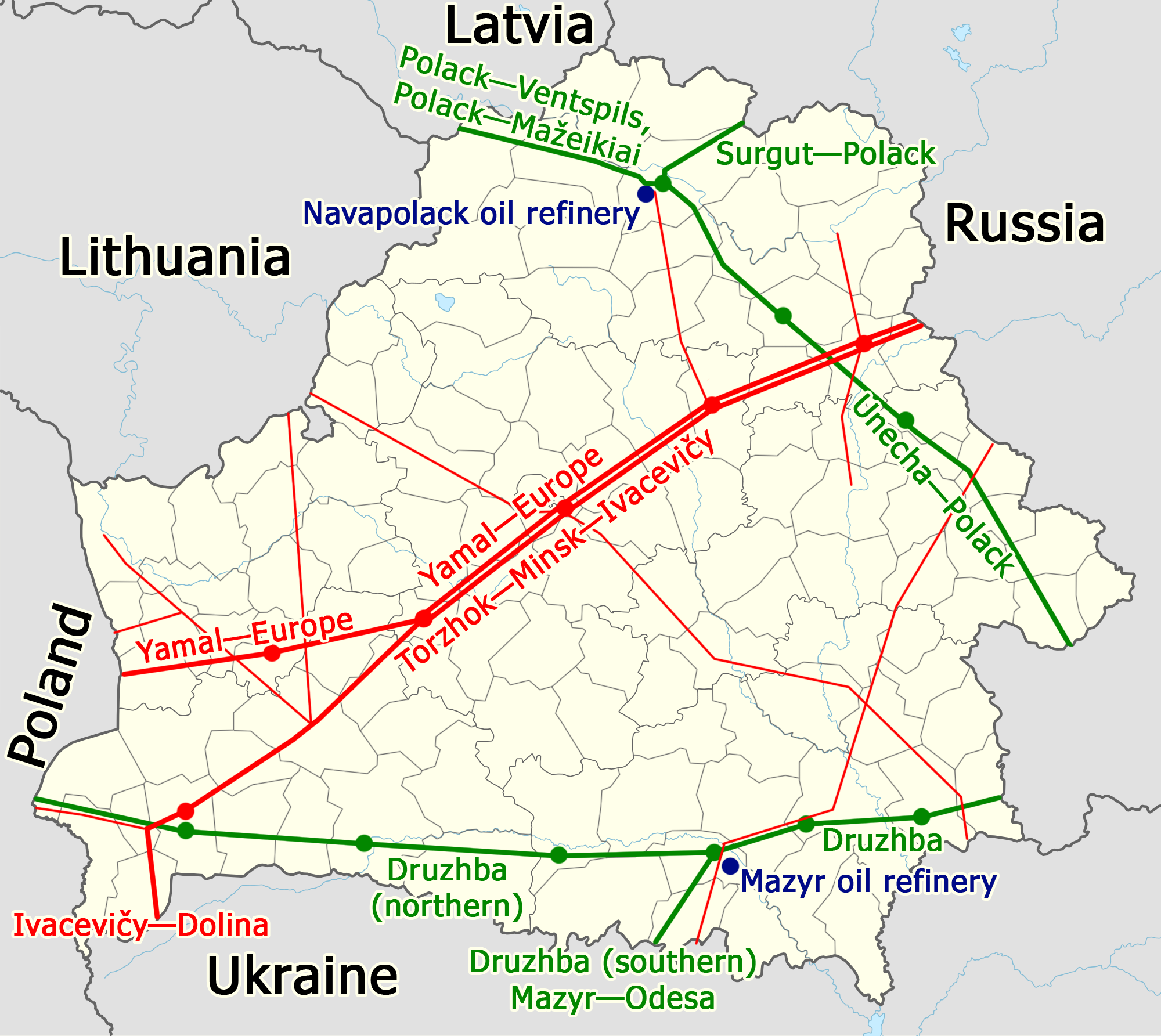
Naftan (Navapolack) oil refinery and pipelines in Belarus (oil pipelines are in green)

OJSC Naftan (Russian: ОАО «Нафтан»; Belarusian: ААТ «Нафтан») is a Belarusian state-owned oil refinery located in Novopolotsk (Navapolatsk) in the Vitebsk region in the north of Belarus. It is one of the two oil refineries in Belarus, the other being Mozyr Oil Refinery, in the south of the country.

== History ==
The Polotsk oil refinery was constructed in 1958–1963. The construction of the plant was launched in 1958 by order of the USSR Council of Ministers. Construction was announced by the All-Union shock construction.

On February 9, 1963, the first gasoline was produced at the refinery. In those years, the plant's capacity was designed to process 6 million tons of crude oil per year. It was awarded an Order of the Red Banner of Labour in 1971. In 1976, it was renamed to Novopolotsk oil refinery. On the same year, it was renamed after XXV CPSU congress.

In 1980 or 1981, the plant was reorganized into the Novopolotsk production association (PO) "Novopolotsknefteorgsintez" (ПО «Новополоцкнефтеоргсинтез»; Novopolotsk oil and organic synthesis). In the late 1980s, faced the problems of giant emissions into the atmosphere (101.8 thousand tons of only an oil refineries) and difficulties in the construction of new installations. Together with the Novopolotsk Community Communist Party, the plant management opposed attempts by impossible and ill-conceived construction, offering to postpone the installation for 15 kilometers from the city.

=== Post-soviet years ===
In 1992, Novopolotsk City Council of People's Deputies decided to renaming and reorganizing "Novopolotsknefteorgsintez" in the production association "Naftan" (Bel. Nafta Navapolatsk). In accordance with the order of the Ministry of Economy of the Republic of Belarus dated August 28, 2002, No. 118, the Republican Unitary Enterprise Novopolotsk Production Association "Naftan" was transformed into an open joint stock company "Naftan". In 2008, Polimir chemical plant was joined to Naftan. OJSC Naftan is part of the Belneftekhim state concern.

Originally, the branch of oil pipeline Druzhba was used to deliver oil from Russian SFSR to the refinery. Railroads are occasionally used to import oil from other sources.

== Current status ==
In 2000, the refinery could process up to 12 million tons of crude oil. In 2017, Naftan processed 8.3 million tons of crude oil, producing 2.8 million tons of diesel fuel, 2.1 million tons of fuel oil (masut), 0.8 million tons of gasoline and other products. 40.5% of production was sold in Belarus, 59.5% in other countries (Russia, Ukraine, Latvia, Lithuania, Netherlands, United Kingdom). Its revenue in 2017 was 6,737.5 million BYN (US$3.1 billion), and net profit was 8.9 million BYN. 99.83% of OJSC Naftan belongs to the state. Naftan had 9893 workers in 2017.

In the late 2010s, a major reconstruction of Naftan oil refinery started. According to Belneftekhim's official site, over US$1 billion was invested in the reconstruction. As of June 2021, modernization of Naftan has not been completed, and the total amount invested was estimated at US$1.6 billion. As of May 2022, Naftan is processesing 11,700 tonnes of oil per day.

== Sanctions ==
On 22 August 2011, the United States placed sanctions on Naftan. They were issued soon after 2010 Belarusian presidential election, for human rights violations in Belarus, but they were temporarily suspended in 2015. In 2021, the State Department of the USA announced that the sanctions should be restored due to human rights violations by Alexander Lukashenko. Lukashenko was given opportunity to avoid sanctions by releasing more than 300 political prisoners, stopping violence and starting national dialogue. Later the sanctions against Naftan were indeed renewed.

On 20 August 2020 (during 2020–2021 Belarusian protests), Naftan workers started an open letter calling on Lukashenko to resign and a new presidential election to be held. The letter was signed by 3238 Naftan employees out of 3500 people who participated in the discussion. Later, several of the most active employees were fired, including the leader of the independent trade union branch.

On 25 May 2021, Euroradio.fm noted that Naftan's joint venture with Russian Lukoil producing motor oil, "LLK-Naftan" (Belarusian and Russian: ЛЛК—Нафтан), changed its name to "EddyTek" (ЭддиТек) and slightly changed the structure of ownership: a 3% share was transferred from Naftan's 50% to the Navapolack city council. Euroradio assumed that this rebranding was an attempt to get out of sanctions.

In 2022, Naftan was included in the sanctions lists of the EU, Switzerland, Canada and Ukraine.

== See also ==
- FC Naftan Novopolotsk
