= Belarus–European Union relations =

- European Union: Belarus

Mutual relations between the Republic of Belarus and the European Union (EU) were initially established after the European Economic Community recognised Belarusian independence in 1991.

After Alexander Lukashenko became the Belarusian leader in 1994, the relationship between Minsk and the EU deteriorated and has remained cold and distanced, as the EU has condemned the government of Belarus several times for authoritarian and anti-democratic practices, and even imposed sanctions on the country.

Following a slight improvement in relations in 2008, the 2010 Belarusian presidential election (which officially saw a landslide victory of almost 80% for Lukashenko) led to mass demonstrations and arrests in Minsk. The EU declared that the imprisonment of opposition figures and protesters contravened human rights laws, and imposed new targeted sanctions on major Belarusian officials and businesspeople.

Belarus is participating in the EU's Eastern Partnership. In October 2015, the EU announced it would suspend most of its sanctions against Belarus. Belarus borders three EU member states: Poland, Lithuania and Latvia.

On 28 June 2021, the Belarusian Ministry of Foreign Affairs confirmed that Belarus would suspend its membership in the Eastern Partnership.

Some prominent Belarusian businessmen became honorary consuls of the European Union countries in Belarus. For instance, Pavel Topuzidis represents Greece and Romania in this capacity, while Alexey Sychev was the honorary consul of Slovakia.

== History ==
European Economic Commission recognised Belarusian independence in 1991, and Belarus is part of several bilateral and multilateral treaties with the European Union. In 1995, Belarus and the European Union signed a Partnership and Cooperation Agreement, but this agreement was not ratified by the EU. Belarus is a member of trade relations agreements based on the EU Generalized System of Preferences and the Most favoured nation. Belarus is also a part of the EU's Eastern Partnership.

Belarus-EU relationships began to worsen after the election of Alexander Lukashenko in 1994, with Belarus excluded from the EU's European Neighbourhood Policy as the EU's reaction towards the establishment of an authoritarian regime under President Lukashenko.

The deterioration of Belarus-EU relationships continued in the 21st century, with the European Union imposing sanctions against Belarusian officials, businessmen and several government-owned companies. The sanctions were the results of political repression following mass protests during the 2010 presidential elections, when several members of the political opposition and protesters were imprisoned and condemned to prison terms.

There are notes of Belarus-EU relations' improvement. Belarus has not supported Russia in its aggression towards Ukraine, and released several political prisoners. In 2015, the EU suspended most of the sanctions against Belarusian officials. In 2016 the travel ban imposed on Lukashenko in 2000 was lifted. This decision was praised by Belarusian officials. Yet, as noted by both EU officials and international organisations, further improvement has slowed due to ongoing human rights violations and suppression of political opposition that are still present in Belarus.

In 2019, Lukashenko made his first official visit to the European Union since sanctions ended. The EU's Eastern Partnership program and further economic initiatives were discussed in Lukashenko's meeting with Austria's Sebastian Kurz.

In 2016, two opposition candidates were elected to Belarus' parliament. This was marked as a step to democratisation by several EU officials.

The visa system is functioning between the EU and Belarus, with Schengen visas required for Belarusians wishing to enter the European Union. Belarus introduced a visa-free entry for citizens of 70 countries including the EU in 2017. In 2019, it was announced that the EU would simplify requirements for obtaining Schengen visas for Belarusians, reducing its costs and time needed for application approval.

Belarus-EU relations are complicated by the stronger Belarusian ties with Russia, who emerged as active EU critic and opponent after the annexation of Crimea in 2014. Belarus is a part of the Belarus-Russia Union State, as well as the European-Asian Union, a customs union which includes both countries and several other CIS-members. As of today, the Belarus-Russia integration is mostly economic, with free trade and free movement zones established between the two countries, but Russia is being seen as demanding deeper political and administrative integration.

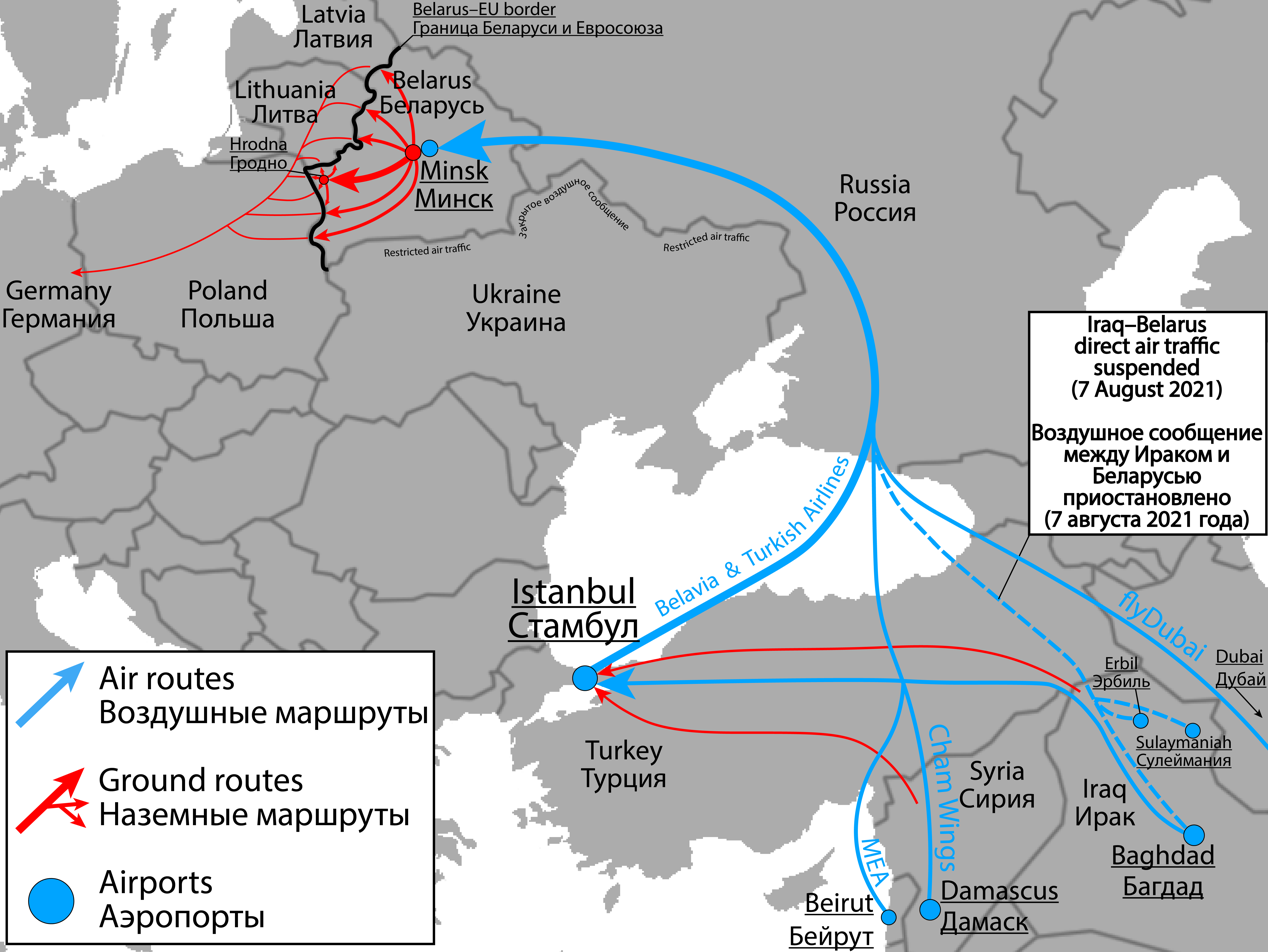
The routes of illegal migration during the 2021 Belarus–European Union border crisis

In 2021, Ryanair Flight 4978 from Greece to Lithuania (both EU members) was forced to land in Minsk by the Belarusian Air Force. The flight was less than 10 km from its destination but still in Belarusian air space. Two passengers, journalist Roman Protasevich, who had published negative comments about the Belarusian government, and his girlfriend Sofia Sapega, were taken and arrested by authorities and the plane was allowed to depart seven hours later. EU members unanimously condemned the action and began to discuss possible responses.

As a response by the EU to the incident, Belarusian airliners have been banned from flying over the EU's airspace and from using any airport of the 27 countries that are members of the bloc.

Later in 2021, Belarusian athlete Krystsina Tsimanouskaya applied for asylum in a number of European Union countries after Belarusian officials tried to force her onto a plane at Tokyo's airport. At the airport, airport police stopped the repatriation and took her to a safe area at the airport. She was able to fly to Poland after they gave her a humanitarian visa.

In February 2022, Belarus permitted Russian forces to utilize its territory as a staging ground for its invasion of Ukraine. In reaction to this, the European Commission, in its role as the custodian of the EU Treaties, is implementing a series of sanction measures against Belarus. On August 3, the Commission declared the extension of the 11th series of specific restrictive measures aimed at both Russia and Belarus. These measures intensify the limitations on exports to Belarus, encompassing a wide range of goods and technologies that contribute to the country's military and technological progress. Furthermore, the Council has enforced an additional prohibition on the export of firearms and ammunition, as well as goods and technology potentially applicable in the aviation and space industries.

== Potential accession of Belarus to the European Union ==
Belarus is not an official candidate for membership in the European Union and has never formally applied to join the bloc. While the country is technically part of the EU's Eastern Partnership, the current government under Alexander Lukashenko suspended its participation in 2021 following a sharp deterioration in diplomatic relations. The European Union has instead imposed extensive economic and political sanctions on the Belarusian regime due to human rights violations, the suppression of democratic opposition, and its support for the Russian invasion of Ukraine.

The Belarusian democratic movement in exile, led by Sviatlana Tsikhanouskaya, actively advocates for a European future and signed a memorandum of understanding with EU institutions in 2025 to deepen cooperation.

Any formal accession process would require a fundamental democratic transition in Minsk and the fulfillment of the Copenhagen criteria, which mandate stable institutions guaranteeing democracy and the rule of law.

== Legal framework ==
Countries that could join the European Union Current members Candidate countries Applicant / potential candidate countries Membership possible Membership not possible

Although the European Union and Belarus signed a Partnership and Cooperation Agreement (PCA) in 1995, which was intended to govern the mutual political and economic relations, this agreement was not ratified by the EU. Furthermore, the European Union has excluded Belarus from its European Neighbourhood Policy (ENP), which was originally designed to establish a "ring of friends" in the Union's geographical proximity. Brussels has claimed this exclusion to be a direct response to the establishment of an authoritarian regime under President Lukashenko.

However, EU–Belarus trade relations are still covered by the Union's Generalised System of Preferences and the most favoured nation (MFN) provisions of the 1989 Agreement between the EU and the Soviet Union. Belarus is amongst the few states in Europe that have not asked for membership in the European Union. Similarly, the European Union has not offered membership to Minsk. Belarus has continuously sought to further its economic and political ties with Russia, being one of the founding members of the Union State (formerly the 'Union State of Russia and Belarus').

In October 2009, a poll conducted by the independent NISEPI institute in Belarus found that 44.1 percent of the Belarusian people would vote Yes in a referendum to join the EU, compared to 26.7 percent one year earlier. Local experts are linking the swing to more pro-EU messages in Belarusian state media, Polish daily Rzeczpospolita says.

On October 30, 2015, it was announced that the EU would suspend most of its sanctions against Belarus, following the freeing of the country's political prisoners in August.

Following a series of mass protests that took place after a disputed presidential election in August 2020, EU High Representative for Foreign Affairs and Security Policy Josep Borrell announced that the EU would bring in sanctions against Belarusian officials responsible for "violence and falsification". Charles Michel, President of the European Council went further on 19 August saying the EU would soon impose sanctions on a “substantial number” of individuals responsible for violence, repression, and election fraud.

== Belarus's foreign relations with EU member states ==
- Austria
- Belgium
- Bulgaria
- Croatia
- Cyprus
- Czech Republic
- Denmark
- Estonia
- Finland
- France
- Germany
- Greece
- Hungary
- (Republic of Ireland) Ireland
- Italy
- Latvia
- Lithuania
- Luxembourg
- Malta
- Netherlands
- Poland
- Portugal
- Romania
- Slovakia
- Slovenia
- Spain
- Sweden

== See also ==
- Belarus-NATO relations
- Euronest Parliamentary Assembly
- Foreign relations of the European Union
- Foreign relations of Belarus
- List of people and organizations sanctioned in relation to human rights violations in Belarus
- INOGATE
