= Belarus–NATO relations =

- NATO: Belarus

Map of Europe with countries in six different colors based on their affiliation with NATO as follows: Members of NATO Accession protocol signed Membership Action Plan / Enhanced Opportunity Partner Individual Partnership Action Plan Partnership for Peace; Note that Membership Action Plan and Individual Partnership Action Plan countries are also Partnership for Peace members. States acceding to NATO replace Partnership for Peace membership with formal entry into the Alliance.

Belarus–NATO relations refers to relations between the Republic of Belarus and the North Atlantic Treaty Organization (NATO).

NATO member countries Accession protocol signed Countries in the process of accession Countries promised invitations / Membership is not the goal Countries have not announced their membership intentions

== Cooperation ==
Belarus joined NATO's Partnership for Peace program in 1995.

=== 1995 ===
Belarus first began cooperating with NATO in signing Partnership for Peace documents in 1995.

=== 1997 ===
Belarus has participated in NATO's Individual Partnership Program since 1997 without joining NATO. Belarus has not joined NATO because it is a member of the Collective Security Treaty Organization under the auspices of Russia, and the Security Treaties with NATO regulate the exchange of classified information affecting the interests of sovereign states.

=== 1998 ===
Since 1998, Belarus has had its own diplomatic mission in NATO.

=== 2004 ===
Belarus formally announced its accession to the NATO process on 19 January 2004, and in January 2006 Belarus and NATO approved the first package of partnership documents, containing 21 objectives (9 common objectives, 7 ground forces, 5 air forces) and an evaluation document.

=== 2006 ===
Tensions between NATO and Belarus peaked after the March 2006 presidential election in Belarus. Belarus began to move in the Russian direction of policy in order to build a unified union of the two states. Belarus's relations with EU and NATO member states have deteriorated. The European Union and the United States have banned members of the Belarusian government from entering their countries following an energy conflict with the Russian Federation in late 2006. Minsk has attempted to change foreign policy. But NATO contributed to Belarus' armaments elimination, which was successfully completed in December 2006: 700,000 weapons were destroyed, which was an important step for Belarus to fulfill its obligations under the Ottawa Convention.

=== 2008–2009 ===
NATO–Belarus relations were more cautious due to internationally recognized political prisoners, limiting working visits to the Prague Summit in May 2009 on the Eastern Partnership. A NATO senior official made his first high-level visit to Minsk in many years in December 2008. In 2009, a Belarusian Chief of Staff of the Belarusian Ministry of Defense took part in the NATO Security Forum. It was agreed to continue work between the relevant experts.

=== 2010 ===
Belarus became a NATO partner among 22. This also applies to the modernization, restructuring of the Armed Forces of Belarus under the program of individual partnership with NATO, the NATO program with Belarus. Identify needs for reform and additional training of forces and resources allocated by partners to participate in the program. Belarus is also a member of the Planning and Analysis (IPA), which highlights ways to improve interoperability and develop appropriate opportunities to enhance Belarus' national defense. NATO provided expertise and advice on how to achieve this. Belarus has made an important contribution to strengthening international, regional and national security and stability in Europe. For example, Belarusian officers and officials continued to participate in courses from NATO countries and their partners in theoretical subjects such as:

- Arms control,
- Organization of air traffic,
- Civil planning,
- Medical service,
- International law in armed conflicts.

Regarding military cooperation, it is noted that relations are good, even if they were good during periods of political and diplomatic tension. A precondition for strengthening Belarus' cooperation with NATO is to achieve an appropriate level of trust that would allow the exchange of classified information through security agreements.

The 2010 NATO–Belarus Individual Partnership Program has already included around 100 practical actions for joint implementation in areas such as:

- Arms control,
- Medical training,
- Language learning
- Civil planning (including during nuclear disasters).

=== 2012 ===
In July 2012 (extended in 2014), a new package of NATO and Belarus targets was approved (6 general, 8 land, 4 air). As part of the agreed objectives of Belarus' partnership with NATO, the declared personnel are regularly trained in Belarus which includes training and field meetings with a permanent and variable composition of the peacekeeping company of the 103rd Guards Separate Mobile Brigade, as well as training of Belarusian servicemen in English and the basics of peacekeeping at the Military Academy of the Republic of Belarus. To ensure interoperability between Partners and NATO for combat training, exercises, and operations in engagement with Allied forces, representatives of the Armed Forces of Belarus receive theoretical training and practical training in specialized courses abroad (including during the NATO Multinational Peacekeeping Exercise).

To participate in the Partnership for Peace, Belarus has agreed on the strengths and means to:

- A peacekeeping company from Belarus in peacekeeping operations;
- Up to 15 Belarusian officers to serve in NATO's multinational headquarters;
- In relation to the IL-76MD military transport aircraft;
- 7 physicians (surgeons and traumatologists);
- 1 mobile hospital of the category "Role 1+" (for medical support of national deployed units);
- Multifunctional platoon;
- Groups of specialists for military-civil interaction.

=== 2014–2015 ===
In 2014, after the Russian occupation of Crimea, a Belarusian delegation headed by the Head of the International Military Cooperation Department of the Belarusian Ministry of Defense paid a visit to NATO Headquarters in Brussels. Each country builds relations with NATO separately according to the "NATO + 1" formula. Belarus' partnership with NATO for 2014-2015 agreed within the framework of the Partnership for Peace planning and assessment process, and prospects for Belarus' cooperation with NATO.

In accordance with the diplomatic protocol, Belarusian diplomats have regular contacts with NATO representatives.

=== 2015–2020 ===
In 2019, after yet another aggravation of Belarusian-Russian relations, Belarusian President Alexander Lukashenko called for improved relations with NATO and lifted restrictions on American diplomats (which had been in place since 2008). “You don’t let our products into your market, you call us parasites, you put pressure on us wherever you can,” Lukashenko said about Moscow’s subsequent “hysteria.”

After Russia's invasion of Ukraine in 2022, Belarus unexpectedly declared its readiness to cooperate with NATO.

== Ideology and propaganda ==
After the protests in Belarus in 2020, the President of Belarus, Alexander Lukashenko, has constantly intimidated the citizens of Belarus with the prospect of NATO invasion from Poland and Lithuania. After meeting with Vladimir Putin in May 2021, he stated that "in case of vigilance and intensification in NATO," Russian troops would be transferred to Belarus "within a day."

In turn, the NATO North Atlantic Council condemned Belarus' actions to forcibly land a Ryanair aircraft, as well as the arrest of Roman Protasevich and his girlfriend Sofia Sapega. The Council stressed that Protasevich's detention violated the principles of political dissent and freedom of the press. NATO Secretary-General Jens Stoltenberg also told a news conference ahead of a meeting of Allied foreign and defense ministers that NATO had decided to restrict Belarus' access to its headquarters in Brussels.

== Belarus's foreign relations with NATO member states ==
- Albania
- Belgium
- Bulgaria
- Canada
- Croatia
- Czech Republic
- Denmark
- Estonia
- Finland
- France
- Germany
- Greece
- Hungary
- Iceland
- Italy
- Latvia
- Lithuania
- Luxembourg
- Montenegro
- Netherlands
- North Macedonia
- Norway
- Poland
- Portugal
- Romania
- Slovakia
- Slovenia
- Spain
- Sweden
- Turkey
- United Kingdom
- United States

== See also ==
- Foreign relations of Belarus
- Foreign relations of NATO
- Enlargement of NATO
- NATO open door policy
- Partnership for Peace
- Armenia–NATO relations
- Azerbaijan–NATO relations
- Georgia–NATO relations
- Moldova–NATO relations
- Russia–NATO relations
- Ukraine–NATO relations
