= Belarus–Cuba relations =

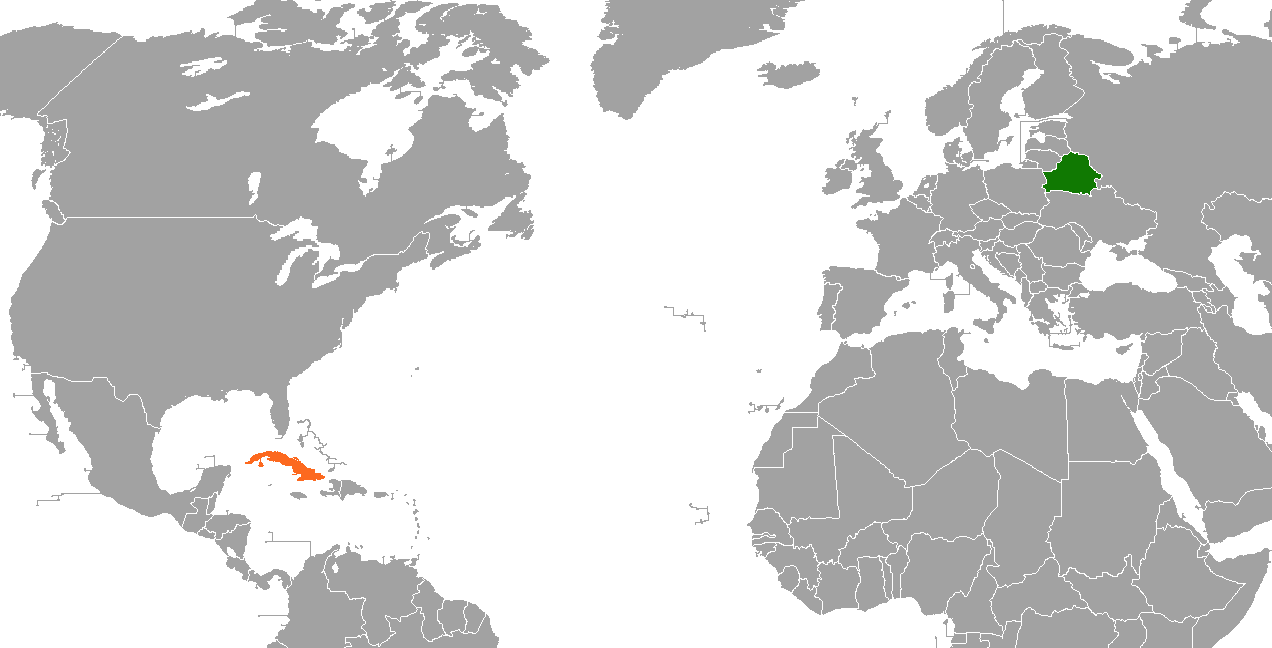

- Belarus: Cuba

Belarus and Cuba established diplomatic relations on 16 April 1992. Both countries are members of the Non-Aligned Movement.

== History ==
In 2007, Cuba was one of 33 countries to vote against a United Nations General Assembly resolution titled "Situation of human rights in Belarus".

Following the 2020 Belarusian presidential election and the subsequent protests, Cuban President Miguel Díaz-Canel reiterated the island's solidarity with the "legitimate president of that country, Alexander Lukashenko, and the brother Belarusian people."

In 2023, Lukashenko said he was glad to receive an envoy from Cuba. “I think it is unnecessary to say anything about Belarusian-Cuban relations, to characterize them. We have always maintained warm and friendly relations. You should know that we will follow these approaches,” Lukashenko stressed, noting that both countries have unique views, and there is no dissent in the diplomatic, political, and even ideological spheres. “When preparing for this meeting and studying the entire range of trade and economic relations, I discovered that we need to seriously bring economic and trade issues closer to the political ones,” Lukashenko said.

== Resident diplomatic missions ==
- Belarus has an embassy in Havana.
- Cuba has an embassy in Minsk.
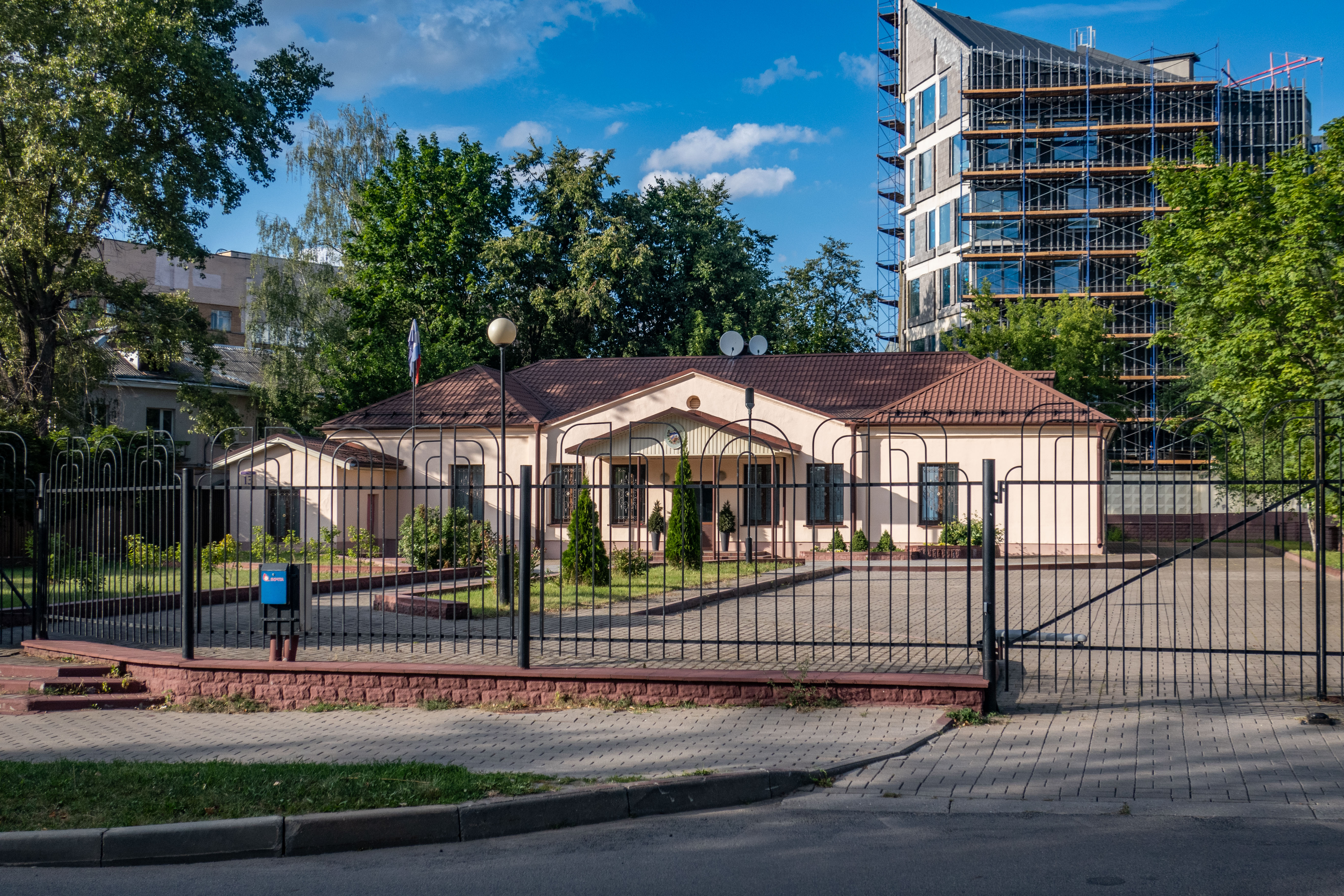
Embassy of Cuba in Minsk

== See also ==
- Foreign relations of Belarus
- Foreign relations of Cuba
