= Foreign relations of Belarus =

The Byelorussian SSR was one of only two Soviet republics to be separate members of the United Nations (the other being the Ukrainian SSR). Both republics and the Soviet Union joined the UN when the organization was founded in 1945.

== Prior to 2001 ==
After the dissolution of the Soviet Union, at which time Belarus gained its independence, Belarus became a member of the Commonwealth of Independent States (CIS), the Organization for Security and Cooperation in Europe (OSCE), NATO's Partnership for Peace, the North Atlantic Cooperation Council, the International Monetary Fund, and the World Bank. The adoption by Supreme Council of the BSSR of the declaration of State Sovereignty of Belarus in 1990 was a turning point on the development of the state. It has also been in a supranational union with Russia since 2 April 1996, although this has had little practical effect. Belarus–Council of Europe relations are based on cooperation and it is not a member (like Russia).

=== Belarus–Russia relations ===
The introduction of free trade between Russia and Belarus in mid-1995 led to a spectacular growth in bilateral trade, which was only temporarily reversed due to the 1998 Russian financial crisis. President Alexander Lukashenko sought to develop a closer relationship with Russia. The framework for the Union of Russia and Belarus was set out in the Treaty on the Formation of a Community of Russia and Belarus (1996), the Treaty on Russia-Belarus Union, the Union Charter (1997), and the Treaty of the Formation of a Union State (1999). The integration treaties contained commitments to monetary union, equal rights, single citizenship, and a common defence and foreign policy.

=== Belarus–European Union relations ===
Following the recognition of Belarus as an independent state in December 1991 by the European Community, EC/EU-Belarus relations initially experienced a steady progress. The signature of the Partnership and Cooperation Agreement (PCA) in 1995 signaled a commitment to political, economic and trade cooperation. Some assistance was provided to Belarus within the framework of the TACIS programme and also through various aid programs and loans. However, progress in EU-Belarus relations stalled in 1996 after serious setbacks to the development of democracy, and the Drazdy conflict.

The EU did not recognize the 1996 constitution, which replaced the 1994 constitution. The Council of the European Union decided against Belarus in 1997: The PCA was not concluded, nor was its trade-related part; Belarusian membership in the Council of Europe was not supported; bilateral relations at the ministerial level were suspended and EU technical assistance programs were frozen.

Acknowledging the lack of progress in relation to bilateral relations and the internal situation following the position adopted in 1997, the EU adopted a step-by-step approach in 1999, whereby sanctions would be gradually lifted upon fulfillment of the four benchmarks set by the Organization for Security and Co-operation in Europe. In 2000, some moderately positive developments toward the implementation of recommendations made by the OSCE AMG were observed but were not sufficient in the realm of access to fair and free elections.

According to the European Commission's website, as of 2025, "The EU has not yet ratified the bilateral Partnership and Cooperation Agreement concluded with Belarus in 1995, due to Belarus' lack of commitment to democracy, and political and civil rights. The bilateral trade and economic relations therefore remain covered by the Trade and Cooperation Agreement concluded by the European Community with the Soviet Union in 1989, and subsequently endorsed by Belarus."

=== Belarus–United Kingdom relations ===
Belarus established diplomatic relations with the United Kingdom on 27 January 1992.

- Belarus maintains an embassy in London.
- The United Kingdom is accredited to Belarus through its embassy in Minsk.

Both countries share common membership of the OSCE. Bilaterally the two countries have a Double Taxation Agreement, and an Investment Agreement.

=== Belarus–United States relations ===
The United States has encouraged Belarus to conclude and adhere to agreements with the International Monetary Fund (IMF) on the program of macroeconomic stabilization and related reform measures, as well as to undertake increased privatization and to create a favorable climate for business and investment. Although there has been some American direct private investment in Belarus, its development has been relatively slow given the uncertain pace of reform. An Overseas Private Investment Corporation agreement was signed in June 1992 but has been suspended since 1995 because Belarus did not fulfill its obligations under the agreement.

Belarus is eligible for Export–Import Bank short-term financing insurance for U.S. investments, but because of the adverse business climate, no projects have been initiated. The IMF granted standby credit in September 1995, but Belarus has fallen off the program and did not receive the second tranche of funding, which had been scheduled for regular intervals throughout 1996.

The United States – along with the European Union – has restricted the travel of President Alexander Lukashenko and members of his inner circle, as well as imposing economic sanctions.

== Present situation (2001 onwards) ==
=== Relations with the European Union ===
The structure of Belarus trade reflects the low competitiveness and output decline of manufacturing industry in the country over the past decade, leading to the predominance of primary production, work-intensive goods as exports. Belarusian exports to the EU consist mainly of agricultural and textile products, while imports from the EU are primarily machinery.

Belarus is a beneficiary of the EU's Generalised System of Preferences (GSP). The European Commission decided in 2003 to initiate an investigation into violations of freedom of association in Belarus as the first step towards a possible temporary withdrawal of the GSP from Belarus.

In December 2004, the EU adopted a position aimed at imposing travel restrictions on officials from Belarus responsible for the fraudulent parliamentary elections and referendum on 17 October 2004, and for human rights violations during subsequent peaceful political demonstrations in Minsk. The European Parliament released a statement in March 2005 in which it denounced the Belarusian government as a dictatorship. The European parliamentarians were primarily concerned about the suppression of independent media outlets in the country and the fraudulent referendum. A resolution of the European Parliament declared that the personal bank accounts of President Lukashenko and other high-ranking Belarusian officials should be tracked and frozen.

In 2005, Amnesty International reported a pattern of deliberate obstruction, harassment and intimidation of human rights defenders in Belarus. Reporters Without Borders accused the Belarusian authorities of hounding and arresting journalists from the country's Polish minority. Lukashenko has closed the country's main Polish newspaper, printing a bogus paper instead with the same name and size that praises his incumbent government. Several foreign, mainly Polish, journalists have been arrested or expelled from the country. Lukashenko accused Poland of an attempt to overthrow his government by stirring up a peaceful revolution in Belarus comparable to the Orange Revolution in Ukraine in 2004.

Later in 2005 the Belarusian riot police seized the headquarters of the Union of Poles in Belarus, an association representing the 400,000 ethnic minority Polish living in western areas of the country that were part of Poland until World War II. The dispute between Poland and Belarus escalated further as Poland responded by recalling its ambassador from Belarus for indefinite consultations, and called on the European Union to impose sanctions on the Belarusian leadership in order to curtail the human rights abuses in Belarus. Belarusian papers described this as a 'dirty political game', and part of a 'cold war' waged on president Lukashenko. Polish Foreign Minister Adam Rotfeld said a clampdown was under way, aimed at destroying "all elements of political pluralism and independence" in Belarus.

Members of the Eastern Partnership

In August 2005 the EU's executive commission called for human rights to be respected in Belarus. The commission said it was considering offering support to independent media in the country and had set aside more than eight million euros from its budget to offer support for human rights activities. France expressed her solidarity with Poland on the issue of human rights in Belarus a day after the EU declared it was worried about the situation in that country. Several former Soviet Republics, including neighbouring Ukraine, also expressed their concerns about the development of the situation in Belarus.

In May 2009 Belarus and the EU agree on cooperation in the Eastern Partnership (EaP). However, it is contended by some scholars that the (EaP) is unable to create a workable partnership. This proved to be correct when Belarus withdrew from the Partnership on 30 September 2011.

In August 2012, Belarus expelled all Swedish diplomats, including the Swedish Ambassador to Belarus, Stefan Eriksson, and closed its embassy in Stockholm, after a Swedish public relations firm released teddy bears carrying pro-democracy flyers in parachutes from an airplane over Minsk on 4 July 2012. Lukashenko also fired his air defence chief and the head of the border guards over the incident. Their replacements have been told not to hesitate to use force to stop future intrusions from abroad.

=== Relations with Russia ===
Russia remains the largest and most important partner for Belarus both in the political and economic fields. After protracted disputes and setbacks, the two countries' customs duties were unified in March 2001 but the customs controls were soon restored. In terms of trade, almost half of Belarusian export goes to Russia. Due to the structure of Belarusian industry, Belarus relies heavily on Russia both for export markets and for the supply of raw materials and components.

After initial negotiation with the Russian Central Bank on monetary union, the Russian ruble was set to be introduced in Belarus in 2004, but this was postponed first until 2005, then until 2006, and now seems to have been suspended indefinitely.

=== Relations with the United States ===
Belarus has had an ongoing discussion to relaunch IMF-backed reforms, concluding an arrangement for an IMF Staff-monitored program (SMP) in 2001. However, the authorities did not follow through with reforms as hoped, leaving an uncertain future for IMF-backed cooperation. Belarus authorities have said on several occasions that they find IMF intervention and recommendations in Belarus counter-productive to the economic development of those countries. The relationships with the United States have been further strained, after Congress of the United States unanimously passed the Belarus Democracy Act of 2004.

On 7 March 2008, the government of Belarus ejected US Ambassador Karen B. Stewart from the country, following a row over travel restrictions placed on President Lukashenko and sanctions against state-owned chemical company Belneftekhim. The Belarusian Foreign Ministry announced at the same time that it was recalling its own ambassador to the US. This was followed by the expulsion of ten other U.S. embassy staff from Minsk in late April. At the same time the government of Belarus ordered the U.S. Embassy in Minsk to cut its staff by half. A White House spokesman described the expulsion as "deeply disappointing".

=== Relations with other countries ===
Due to strained relations with the United States and the European Union, as well as occasional high-level disputes with Russia over prices on core imported natural resources such as oil and gas, Belarus aims to develop better relations with countries in other regions, like the Middle East, Asia, and Latin America.

==== Hong Kong national security law ====
Belarus was one of 53 countries that in June 2020 supported the Hong Kong national security law at the United Nations Human Rights Council.

=== Nuclear weapons offer ===
In May 2023, the President of Belarus offered nuclear weapons to other countries who join Belarus and Russia.

== Diplomatic relations ==
List of countries which Belarus maintains diplomatic relations with:

#	Country	Date
1	Ukraine	27 December 1991
2	United States	28 December 1991
3	Lithuania	30 December 1991
4	Australia	9 January 1992
5	Mexico	14 January 1992
6	Sweden	14 January 1992
7	China	20 January 1992
8	Mongolia	24 January 1992
9	Vietnam	24 January 1992
10	France	25 January 1992
11	Japan	26 January 1992
12	Portugal	26 January 1992
13	Chile	27 January 1992
14	United Kingdom	27 January 1992
15	Egypt	1 February 1992
16	North Korea	3 February 1992
17	Denmark	4 February 1992
18	Norway	4 February 1992
19	Austria	5 February 1992
20	Brazil	10 February 1992
21	Liechtenstein	10 February 1992
22	South Korea	10 February 1992
23	Switzerland	10 February 1992
24	Hungary	12 February 1992
25	Spain	13 February 1992
26	Romania	14 February 1992
27	Bangladesh	21 February 1992
28	Finland	26 February 1992
29	Poland	2 March 1992
30	Greece	5 March 1992
31	Malaysia	5 March 1992
32	Belgium	10 March 1992
33	Germany	13 March 1992
34	Netherlands	24 March 1992
35	Turkey	25 March 1992
36	Bulgaria	26 March 1992
37	Israel	26 March 1992
38	Ireland	27 March 1992
39	Guinea	4 April 1992
40	Estonia	6 April 1992
41	Latvia	7 April 1992
42	Cyprus	9 April 1992
43	New Zealand	9 April 1992
44	Italy	13 April 1992
45	Canada	15 April 1992
46	Cuba	16 April 1992
47	Zimbabwe	16 April 1992
48	India	17 April 1992
49	Ghana	5 May 1992
50	Morocco	8 May 1992
51	Kuwait	25 May 1992
52	Equatorial Guinea	25 May 1992
53	Cape Verde	4 June 1992
54	Thailand	21 June 1992
55	Costa Rica	24 June 1992
56	Russia	25 June 1992
57	Uruguay	7 July 1992
58	Luxembourg	9 July 1992
59	Oman	23 July 1992
60	Slovenia	23 July 1992
61	Burundi	24 July 1992
62	Nigeria	3 August 1992
63	Singapore	12 August 1992
64	Kazakhstan	16 September 1992
65	Croatia	25 September 1992
66	United Arab Emirates	20 October 1992
67	Argentina	6 November 1992
—	Holy See	11 November 1992
68	Paraguay	18 November 1992
69	Moldova	19 November 1992
70	Bosnia and Herzegovina	22 November 1992
71	Burkina Faso	25 November 1992
72	Colombia	9 December 1992
73	Czech Republic	5 January 1993
74	Slovakia	14 January 1993
75	North Macedonia	20 January 1993
76	Kyrgyzstan	21 January 1993
77	Turkmenistan	21 January 1993
78	Uzbekistan	21 January 1993
79	Malta	16 February 1993
80	South Africa	4 March 1993
81	Guatemala	11 March 1993
82	Iran	18 March 1993
83	Ecuador	5 May 1993
84	Albania	17 May 1993
85	Madagascar	28 May 1993
86	Armenia	11 June 1993
87	Azerbaijan	11 June 1993
88	Indonesia	18 June 1993
89	Nepal	19 July 1993
90	Syria	26 August 1993
91	Zambia	13 October 1993
92	Mali	3 November 1993
93	Kenya	17 November 1993
94	Maldives	6 December 1993
95	Georgia	6 January 1994
96	Pakistan	3 February 1994
97	Laos	7 February 1994
98	Bolivia	11 April 1994
99	Ethiopia	18 May 1994
100	Nicaragua	24 May 1994
101	Jamaica	6 June 1994
102	Serbia	15 November 1994
103	Cambodia	25 January 1995
104	Angola	24 April 1995
105	Yemen	7 August 1995
106	Algeria	24 October 1995
107	Qatar	16 January 1996
108	Lebanon	21 March 1996
—	Sovereign Military Order of Malta	30 April 1996
109	Philippines	22 May 1996
110	Tanzania	23 May 1996
111	Bahrain	1 July 1996
112	Libya	9 July 1996
113	Tajikistan	5 September 1996
114	Jordan	15 October 1996
115	Gabon	5 December 1996
116	Iraq	26 December 1996
117	Tunisia	29 January 1997
118	Venezuela	4 February 1997
119	Peru	19 February 1997
120	Saudi Arabia	6 June 1997
121	Eritrea	11 September 1998
122	Ivory Coast	30 September 1998
123	Uganda	2 October 1998
124	Panama	22 October 1998
125	Afghanistan	15 June 1999
126	Sudan	15 July 1999
127	El Salvador	25 October 1999
128	Haiti	29 October 1999
129	Guyana	25 February 2000
130	Mozambique	29 February 2000
131	Antigua and Barbuda	18 May 2000
132	Grenada	31 May 2000
133	Belize	4 August 2000
134	Saint Lucia	25 August 2000
135	Myanmar	22 September 2000
136	Sri Lanka	20 November 2000
137	Namibia	21 December 2000
138	Dominican Republic	18 April 2001
139	Iceland	25 May 2001
140	Benin	21 June 2001
141	Malawi	13 July 2001
142	Chad	20 August 2001
143	Nauru	12 September 2001
144	Seychelles	4 October 2001
145	São Tomé and Príncipe	11 December 2001
146	Senegal	25 January 2002
147	Republic of the Congo	11 February 2002
148	Rwanda	25 February 2002
149	Gambia	10 April 2002
150	Saint Vincent and the Grenadines	24 April 2002
151	Honduras	20 May 2002
152	Guinea-Bissau	27 September 2002
153	Brunei	4 November 2002
—	State of Palestine	4 February 2003
154	Mauritius	26 September 2003
155	Sierra Leone	27 September 2003
156	Somalia	3 October 2003
157	Mauritania	6 July 2004
158	Dominica	9 July 2004
159	Botswana	15 March 2006
160	Montenegro	8 August 2006
161	Cameroon	14 November 2006
162	San Marino	9 February 2009
163	Suriname	2 June 2009
164	Fiji	26 May 2010
165	Togo	28 September 2010
166	Democratic Republic of the Congo	16 November 2010
167	Trinidad and Tobago	12 April 2011
168	Andorra	27 September 2011
169	Niger	29 March 2012
170	Central African Republic	4 April 2012
171	Solomon Islands	10 September 2012
172	Tuvalu	12 September 2012
173	Djibouti	26 August 2013
174	South Sudan	3 September 2013
175	Timor-Leste	1 October 2014
176	Monaco	15 April 2016
177	Liberia	27 April 2016
178	Saint Kitts and Nevis	4 June 2016
179	Bahamas	9 December 2019
180	Barbados	10 December 2019
181	Lesotho	2020
182	Eswatini	4 June 2024

== Bilateral relations ==
=== Multilateral ===
Organization	Formal Relations Began	Notes
European Union		See Belarus–European Union relations
NATO		See Belarus–NATO relations

=== Africa ===
Country	Formal Relations Began	Notes
Angola	1995-04-24	Bilateral relations were established on 24 April 1995.: Angola is accredited to Belarus from its embassy in Russia.; Belarus is accredited to Angola from its embassy in South Africa.
Ethiopia	1994-05	Diplomatic relations were established between the two countries in May 1994.: Belarus had an embassy in Addis Ababa, which opened in 2013 and closed in 2018.
Kenya	1993-11-17	Bilateral relations were established on 17 November 1993: Belarus has an embassy in Nairobi.; Kenya is accredited to Belarus from its embassy in Moscow, Russia.
Libya	1992	See Belarus–Libya relations.: Belarus operated an embassy in Tripoli between 2000 and 2014, but suspended operations due to escalation of the military conflict.; Libya closed its embassy in Belarus in 2015.
Mozambique	2000-02-29	Bilateral relations were established between Belarus and Mozambique on 29 February 2000.: Belarus is represented in Mozambique through its embassy in South Africa.; In 2017 the interior ministries of the two countries signed an agreement to work together to fight terrorism.
Namibia	2000-12-21	The two countries established bilateral relations on 21 December 2000.: Belarus is represented in Namibia through its embassy in South Africa.; Namibia is represented in Belarus through its embassy in Moscow, Russia.
South Africa	March 1993	Belarus has an embassy in Pretoria; South Africa is represented in Belarus through its embassy in Moscow, Russia
Sudan	1999-07-15	See Belarus–Sudan relations
Zimbabwe	1992-04-16	Bilateral relations were established on 16 April 1992.: Belarus opened an embassy in Harare in July 2022.

=== Americas ===
Country	Formal Relations Began	Notes
Argentina		Argentina is accredited to Belarus from its embassy in Moscow, Russia.; Belarus has an embassy in Buenos Aires.
Brazil		Belarus has an embassy in Brasília.; Brazil has an embassy in Minsk.
Canada	1992-04-15	Belarus and Canada established diplomatic relations on 15 April 1992.: Belarus had an embassy in Ottawa, which was closed on September 1, 2021, as a result of Canada's condemnation of the forced grounding of Ryanair Flight 4978; Canada is represented in Belarus through its embassy in Warsaw (Poland).
Cuba	1992-04	Bilateral relations between Cuba and Belarus began in April 1992.: Belarus opened an embassy in Havana, Cuba, in November 1998, its first in Latin America and the Caribbean.; Cuba upgraded its representation in Havana [Minsk?], Belarus, to an embassy in May 1997.
Dominica	2004	Both countries established diplomatic relations on 9 July 2004.
Dominican Republic		Belarus has an honorary consulate in Santo Domingo, operated though the embassy in Cuba.; Dominican Republic has an honorary consulate in Minsk.
Ecuador		The governments of Belarus and Ecuador concluded an agreement about mutual visa-free travel. It was signed in Quito on 20 June 2014, ratified by Belarus law on 29 December 2014.: Belarus is accredited to Ecuador from its embassy in Caracas, Venezuela.; Ecuador is accredited to Belarus from its embassy in Moscow, Russia.
Guyana	2000	Both countries established diplomatic relations on 25 February 2000.
Mexico	January 1992	See Belarus–Mexico relations Belarus and Mexico established diplomatic relations in January 1992.: Belarus is accredited to Mexico from its embassy in Havana, Cuba, and maintains an honorary consulate in Mexico City.; Mexico is accredited to Belarus from its embassy in Moscow, Russia, and maintains an honorary consulate in Minsk.
Panama	1998-10-22	Both countries established diplomatic relations on 22 October 1998.: Panama is represented in Belarus through its embassy in Moscow, Russia.
United States	1991	See Belarus–United States relations Embassy of Belarus in Washington, D.C. Diplomatic relations between the United States and Belarus began in 1991 upon the dissolution of the Soviet Union, of which Belarus had been a part. However, the relations have turned sour due to accusations by the United States that Belarus has been undemocratic. Belarus, in turn, has accused the United States of interfering in its internal affairs.: Belarus has an embassy in Washington, D.C., and a consulate-general in New York.; United States closed its embassy in Minsk in February 2022 for allowing Russian soldiers to use Belarus as a staging for the Russian invasion of Ukraine.
Uruguay	1992	Belarus is accredited to Uruguay from its embassy in Buenos Aires, Argentina, and maintains an honorary consulate in Montevideo.; Uruguay is accredited to Belarus from its embassy in Moscow, Russia.
Venezuela	1992	Belarus has an embassy in Caracas.; Venezuela has an embassy in Minsk.

=== Asia ===
Country	Formal Relations Began	Notes
Armenia	1992	See Armenia–Belarus relations: Before 1991, both countries were part of the USSR, and before then part of the Russian Empire.; Armenia has an embassy in Minsk.; Belarus has an embassy in Yerevan.; There are around 25,000 people of Armenian descent living in Belarus.; Armenia and Belarus withdrew their respective Ambassadors to one another in June 2024, with Armenian Prime Minister Nikol Pashinyan saying that no official representative of Armenia would visit Belarus while Alexander Lukashenko remained Belarusian President, following Belarusian support for Azerbaijan in the 2023 Azerbaijani offensive in Nagorno-Karabakh.
Azerbaijan	1992	See Azerbaijan–Belarus relations: Before 1918, they were part of the Russian Empire and before 1991, they were part of the Soviet Union.; Azerbaijan has an embassy in Minsk.; Belarus has an embassy in Baku.; Both countries are full members of the Organization for Security and Co-operation in Europe (OSCE) and the Commonwealth of Independent States (CIS).; Azerbaijan is a full member of the Council of Europe, Belarus is a candidate; Both Belarus and Azerbaijan are full members of the Non-Aligned Movement (NAM).
Bangladesh	1992-02-21	Bilateral relations were established on 21 February 1992.: Belarus is primarily represented in Bangladesh through its embassy in India, but also has an honorary consulate in Dhaka.; Bangladesh has represented in Belarus by its ambassador in Moscow, Russia since June 2010.
China	1992	See Belarus–China relations: Belarus has an embassy in Beijing.; China has an embassy in Minsk.
Georgia	1992	See Belarus–Georgia relations: Belarus has an embassy in Tbilisi, which opened on 20 December 2016.; Georgia has an embassy in Minsk.; Georgian Ministry of Foreign Affairs about relations with Belarus
India	1992-04-17	See also: Belarus–India relations: Belarus has had an embassy in New Delhi since June 1998. It also has an honorary consul in Kolkata.; Since 14 May 1992, India has an embassy in Minsk.
Iran	1993-03-18	See Belarus–Iran relations. Bilateral relations were established on 18 March 1993.: Belarus has had an embassy in Tehran since 6 March 1998.; Iran opened an embassy in Minsk in February 2001.; The two countries have enjoyed good relations in recent years reflected in regular high level meetings and various agreements. In 2008, Belarusian Foreign Minister Sergei Martynov described Iran as an important partner of his country in the region and the world.
Israel	1992	See Belarus–Israel relations; Belarus and Israel established diplomatic relations in 1992. During the 1990s, around 130,000 Belarusian citizens immigrated to Israel, forming one of the largest Belarusian expatriate communities in the world. In August 2015, an agreement was signed on visa-free entry, making Israel the first country outside the Former Soviet Union to have visa-free travel with Belarus.: Israel and Belarus have signed multiple agreements, including for visa-free travel.; Belarus has an embassy in Tel Aviv.; Israel has an embassy in Minsk. This was closed for 2 years from 2002 and a decision to close it again in 2016 was reversed after two months.
Japan	1992-01-26	The two countries established bilateral relations on 26 January 1992.: Belarus has an embassy in Tokyo, opened in June 1995.; Japan opened an embassy in Minsk in January 1993.
Kazakhstan	1992-09-16	Bilateral relations began on 16 September 1992.: Since 13 July 1997, Belarus has an embassy in Astana, an embassy division in Almaty opened in July 2002.; Since 9 January 1993, Kazakhstan has an embassy in Minsk.; Both countries are full members of the Eurasian Economic Community, of the Collective Security Treaty Organisation and of the Commonwealth of Independent States
Kyrgyzstan	1993-07-21	Belarus and Kyrgyzstan established diplomatic relations on 21 July 1993. Relations were disrupted between August 2012 and October 2015 after Kyrgyzstan recalled their ambassador.: Belarus has an embassy in Bishkek.; Kyrgyzstan has an embassy in Minsk.; Both countries are full members of the Eurasian Economic Community, of the Collective Security Treaty Organisation and of the Commonwealth of Independent States.
Maldives	1993-12-06	Both countries established diplomatic relations on 6 December 1993.
Myanmar	22 September 2000	See Belarus-Myanmar relations
Nepal	1993-07-19	Belarus and Nepal established diplomatic relations on 19 July 1993.: Belarus has an honorary consulate in Kathmandu, operated by the embassy in India.; Nepal has an honorary consulate general in Minsk.; Minsk and Kathmandu have established twin city relations.
North Korea	1992	See Foreign relations of North Korea. Relations were established in 1992.: Belarus has a consulate in Hamgyong-namdo; North Korea operates an embassy in Minsk, opened in 2016, although Belarus recognises this only as a trade mission, with other representation through the embassy in Moscow (Russia).; North Korean President Kim Il Sung visited the Belarusian SSR in 1984. During the visit, he visited the Minsk Tractor Works and the Brest Fortress.
Pakistan		See Pakistan–Belarus relations Diplomatic relations were established on 3 February 1994.: Belarus has an embassy in Islamabad.; Pakistan maintains an embassy in Minsk.; Pakistan and Belarus maintain very close relations with each other, Pakistan was one of the first countries to accept Belarus after its independence. President of Belarus and PM of Pak have visited each other's countries on state visits. Pakistan and Belarus have a huge trade partnership. Pakistan also provides Belarus with Military expertise.
South Korea	1992-02-10	See Belarus–South Korea relations The establishment of diplomatic relations between the Republic of Korea and the Republic of Belarus started on 10 February 1992.: Belarusian embassy in Seoul.; South Korean embassy in Minsk.; The Belarusian Deputy Minister of Foreign Affairs of Belarus has visited Seoul on 9 February 2015.; Foreign relations of South Korea#Europe.
Sri Lanka	2000-11-20	Bilateral relations were established on 20 November 2000.: Belarus has an honorary consulate in Colombo and is mainly represented through its embassy in India.; Sri Lanka opened an honorary consulate in Belarus in 2004.
Syria	1992	Belarus has an embassy in Damascus.; Syria has an embassy in Minsk.; See Belarus-Syria relations
Tajikistan	1992	Belarus has an embassy in Dushanbe.; Tajikistan has an embassy in Minsk.
Turkey	1992-05-25	See Belarus–Turkey relations: Turkey was the first country to recognize Belarus on 16 December 1991 after the declaration of its independence on 25 August 1991.; Belarus has an embassy in Ankara.; Turkey has an embassy in Minsk.; Both countries are full members of the Council of Europe and the Organization for Security and Co-operation in Europe (OSCE).
Turkmenistan	1992	Belarus has an embassy in Ashgabat.; Turkmenistan has an embassy in Minsk.
Uzbekistan	1992	See Belarus–Uzbekistan relations: Belarus has an embassy in Tashkent.; Uzbekistan is accredited to Belarus from its embassy in Moscow, Russia.; Both countries are full members of the Eurasian Economic Community, of the Collective Security Treaty Organisation and of the Commonwealth of Independent States
Vietnam	27 December 1991	Since 1997, Belarus has an embassy in Hanoi.; Since November 2003, Vietnam has an embassy in Minsk.

=== Europe ===
Country	Formal Relations Began	Notes
Austria	1992	Austria recognised Belarus in December 1991 and both countries established diplomatic relations in February 1992.; Austria is represented in Belarus through its embassy in Moscow, Russia.; Since March 1993, Belarus has an embassy in Vienna.
Bosnia and Herzegovina	1993-11-22	Belarus and Bosnia and Herzegovina established bilateral relations on 22 November 1993.: Belarus has been represented in Bosnia and Herzegovina by the ambassador to Hungary since March 2014.; Bosnia and Herzegovina is represented in Belarus by the embassy in Russia.
Bulgaria	1992-03-26	Bulgaria recognised Belarus on 23 December 1991.; Belarus has an embassy in Sofia and an honorary consulate in Burgas.; Bulgaria has an embassy in Minsk.; Both countries are full members of the Organization for Security and Co-operation in Europe.
Croatia	1992-09-25	See Belarus–Croatia relations: Croatia is primarily represented in Belarus through its embassy in Moscow, Russia, although an honorary consulate opened in Minsk in 2011.; Belarus is represented in Croatia through its embassy in Vienna, Austria, and an honorary consulate in Rijeka, Croatia.; Croatian Foreign Minister Tonino Picula on 24 June 2000 attended a summit of the Central European Initiative in Szeged, Hungary, and held bilateral talks with his counterpart from Belarus.; At least three bilateral agreements have been signed between the two counties.; 2001 Reciprocal Promotion and Protection of Investments; 2004 Avoidance of double taxation and the prevention of fiscal evasion with respect to taxes on income and on capital; 2005 International Road Transport
Cyprus	1991	Belarus has an honorary consulate in Nicosia.; Cyprus is represented in Belarus through its embassy in Moscow, Russia, and through an honorary consulate in Minsk.
Czech Republic	1993	See Belarus–Czech Republic relations: Belarus has an embassy in Prague.; The Czech Republic has an embassy in Minsk and an honorary consulate in Brest.; Both countries are full members of the Organization for Security and Co-operation in Europe.
Denmark		See Belarus–Denmark relations: Belarus is accredited to Denmark from its embassy in Stockholm, Sweden.; Denmark is accredited to Belarus from its embassy in Moscow, Russia.
Estonia	1992-04-06	Bilateral relations began on 6 April 1992.: Belarus has an embassy in Tallinn.; Estonia opened its embassy in Minsk on 20 October 2009.
Finland	1992-02-26	Finland recognised the independence of Belarus on 30 December 1991.; Finland is represented in Belarus through its embassy in Vilnius, Lithuania, which also operates a liaison office in Minsk.; Belarus opened an embassy in Helsinki on 5 December 2011.
France	1992-01	Belarus and France established diplomatic relations in January 1992.: Belarus has an embassy in Paris and honorary consulates in Bordeaux, Lyon and Marseille; France has an embassy in Minsk.; The late French director Roger Vadim was of partial Belarusian descent.
Germany	1923	See Belarus–Germany relations: Belarus has an embassy in Berlin. It also has a consulate general in Munich and honorary consulates in Hamburg and Cottbus. The embassy branch office in Bonn closed on 22 December 2013.; Germany has an embassy in Minsk.; German Federal Foreign Office about relations with Belarus; In 2018, for the first time a German head of state visited Belarus.
Greece		See Belarus–Greece relations: Belarus is accredited to Greece from its embassy in Paris, France.; Greece is accredited to Belarus from its embassy in Moscow, Russia.
Hungary	1992-02-12	Bilateral relations were established between Belarus and Hungary on 12 February 1992.: Belarus has an embassy in Budapest which opened in January 2000.; Hungary has an embassy in Minsk which opened in December 2007.; Both countries are full members of the Organization for Security and Co-operation in Europe.; Belarus and Hungary have in place a bilateral agreement to prevent double taxation.
Ireland	1992-03-27	Belarus and Ireland established bilateral relations on 27 March 1992.: Belarus is represented in Ireland through its embassy in London, United Kingdom, and also has an honorary consulate in Rathdrum, County Wicklow.; Ireland is represented in Belarus through its embassy in Lithuania.
Italy	1992-04-13	Bilateral relations were established on 13 April 1992.: Belarus has an embassy in Rome and five honorary consulates (in Cagliari, Florence, Naples, Reggio Emilia and Turin). The embassy was opened as a consulate general in November 1993 and was upgraded to an embassy on 20 March 1996.; Italy has an embassy in Minsk, opened in May 1992.
Latvia	1992-04-07	See Belarus–Latvia relations The two countries signed a "Declaration on the Principles of Good-Neighborly Relations" on 16 December 1991 and established full bilateral relations on 7 April 1992. Embassies were opened in both countries in 1993 and consulates general the following year.: Belarus has an embassy in Riga and a general consulate in Daugavpils.; Latvia has an embassy in Minsk and a consulate in Vitebsk.; The countries share 161 km of common border.; Belarusian and Latvian regions have signed about 60 twin city and partner agreements.
Lithuania	1992-12-30	See Belarus–Lithuania relations Both countries recognised each other's independence in December 1991, and signed an agreement on diplomatic relations on 30 December 1992.: Belarus has an embassy in Vilnius and an honorary consulate in Klaipėda.; Lithuania has an embassy in Minsk and a consulate general in Hrodna.; Both countries share 679 km (422 mi) of common border.
Malta	1993-02-16	Diplomatic relations were established on 16 February 1993.: Belarus is represented in Malta through its embassy in Rome, Italy.; Malta is represented in Belarus through its embassy in Warsaw, Poland.
Moldova	1992-11-19	Bilateral relations were established on 19 November 1992.: Belarus has an embassy in Chisinau, opened in May 1995.; Moldova has an embassy in Minsk, opened July 1995.; President Alexander Lukashenko has made three state visits to Chisinau (August 1995, September 2014, April 2018); List of Ambassadors of Belarus in Moldova: Vasily Sakovich (1999–2009), Vyacheslav Osipenko (2009–2015), Sergei Chichuk (2015–2020), Anatoly Kalinin( 2020–present)
Netherlands	1994-03-24	See Belarus–Netherlands relations Bilateral relations began on 24 March 1992.: Belarus has an embassy in The Hague and honorary consulates in Amsterdam, Eindhoven and Hoogeveen.; The Netherlands is represented in Belarus through its embassy in Warsaw, Poland, and through an honorary consulate in Minsk.; Both countries are full members of the Organization for Security and Co-operation in Europe.
Poland	1992-03-02	See Belarus–Poland relations Belarus and Poland established bilateral relations on 2 March 1992.: Poland was one of the first countries to recognise Belarusian independence.; Belarus has an embassy in Warsaw, consulates general in Gdańsk and Białystok, and a consulate in Biała Podlaska.; Poland has an embassy in Minsk and consulates general in Brest and Grodno.
Portugal		Belarus is accredited to Portugal from its embassy in Paris, France.; Portugal is accredited to Belarus from its embassy in Moscow, Russia.
Romania	1992-02-14	See Belarus–Romania relations Romania recognised the independence of Belarus on 20 December 1991 and bilateral relations were established on 14 February 1992.: Belarus has an embassy in Bucharest.; Romania has an embassy in Minsk.
Russia	1992-06-25	See Belarus–Russia relations Belarus and Russia established diplomatic relations on 25 June 1992.: Belarus has an embassy in Moscow with departments in Ekaterinburg, Kazan, Kaliningrad, Krasnoyarsk, Nizhny Novgorod, Novosbirsk, Rostov-on-Don, St. Petersburg, Smolensk, Ufa and Khabarovsk. It also has honorary consuls based in Karsnodar, Moscow, Murmansk and the Republic of Tatarstan.; Russia has an embassy in Minsk and a consulate general in Brest.; Russia remains the largest and most important partner for Belarus both in the political and economic fields.
Serbia	1994-11-15	See Belarus–Serbia relations: Serbia (then Yugoslavia) recognised Belarus in December 1991 and both countries established diplomatic relations in November 1994 and at the ambassadorial level in 1996.; Belarus has an embassy in Belgrade.; Serbia has an embassy in Minsk.
Slovakia	1993	Belarus has an embassy in Bratislava.; Since 1995, Slovakia has an embassy in Minsk.; Both countries are full members of the Organization for Security and Co-operation in Europe.
Slovenia	1992-07-23	Diplomatic relations between the two countries were established on 23 July 1992.: Belarus is represented in Slovenia through its embassy in Hungary.; Slovenia is represented in Belarus through its embassy in Russia.
Spain	1992-02-13	See Belarus–Spain relations: Belarus has an embassy in Madrid.; Spain is represented in Belarus through it embassy in Moscow, Russia.; Both countries are full members of the Organization for Security and Co-operation in Europe.
Sweden	1992	In August 2012 Belarus announced that their embassy in Stockholm would be shut down.; Sweden has an embassy in Minsk, however, no accredited diplomats are stationed there and the embassy has been closed to the public since 30 August 2012.; Both countries are full members of the Organization for Security and Co-operation in Europe.
Switzerland		Switzerland recognised Belarus on 23 December 1991.; Switzerland has since 2019 an embassy in Minsk.; Belarus has an embassy in Bern.; Swiss Federal Department of Foreign Affairs about relations with Belarus
Ukraine		See Belarus–Ukraine relations: The two countries share 891 km of border.; Belarus has an embassy in Kyiv and an honorary consulate in Lviv.; Ukraine has an embassy in Minsk and a general consulate in Brest.; Both countries are members of the Baku Initiative and Central European Initiative.
United Kingdom	1991	See Belarus–United Kingdom relations Belarus established diplomatic relations with the United Kingdom on 27 January 1992.: Belarus maintains an embassy in London.; The United Kingdom is accredited to Belarus through its embassy in Minsk.; Both countries share common membership of the OSCE. Bilaterally the two countries have a Double Taxation Agreement, and an Investment Agreement.

=== Oceania ===
Country	Formal Relations Began	Notes
Australia	9 January 1992	Australia is accredited to Belarus from its embassy in Moscow, Russia.; Belarus is accredited to Australia from its embassy in Tokyo, Japan.
New Zealand	9 April 1992	Belarus is accredited to New Zealand from its embassy in Tokyo, Japan.; New Zealand is accredited to Belarus from its embassy in Moscow, Russia.

== See also ==
- Belarus–European Union relations
- Belarus–NATO relations
- List of diplomatic missions in Belarus
- List of diplomatic missions of Belarus
- Visa requirements for Belarusian citizens
