= Belarus–Spain relations =

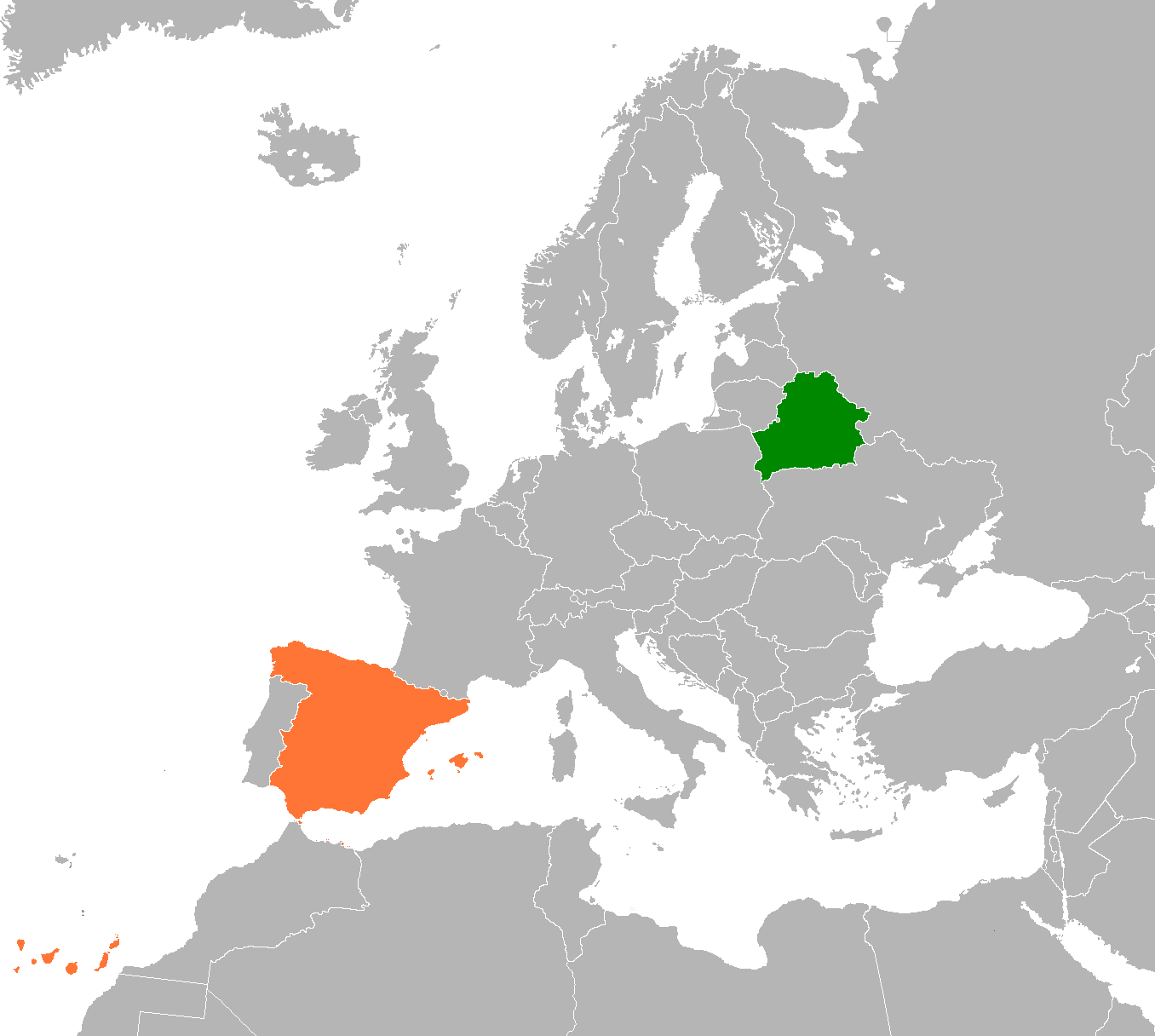

- Belarus: Spain

The bilateral relations maintained between Spain and Belarus are scarce.

== History ==
Belarus and Spain established diplomatic relations on 13 February 1992.

In 2017, Belarus started operating an embassy in Spain. The ambassador of Spain in Moscow is accredited in Belarus. There is an honorary consul of Spain in Minsk.

Formal development of cultural relations took off in January 2018, with the visit of Belarusian minister Alexander Shamko to Spain.

During the 2020–2021 Belarusian protests, Spain, along with the rest of the European Union countries, positioned itself in favor of the opposition leader Sviatlana Tsikhanouskaya and against the government of Aleksandr Lukashenko.

== Economic relations ==
As of 2021, trade relations are merely testimonial.

== Cooperation ==
Spain carries out a reception program for children from Belarus, affected by the Chernobyl disaster, by Spanish families (about 3,000 children at Christmas and summer). Spain contributed €50,000 [€2008] to the Trust Fund of the European Humanities University (in exile in Vilnius). From 2001 to 2012 there was a reader of AECID at the State Linguistic University of Minsk.

== Resident diplomatic missions ==
- Belarus has an embassy in Madrid.
- Spain is accredited to Belarus from its embassy in Moscow, Russia.

== See also ==
- Foreign relations of Belarus
- Foreign relations of Spain
- Belarus-NATO relations
- Belarus-EU relations
