= Belarus–Romania relations =

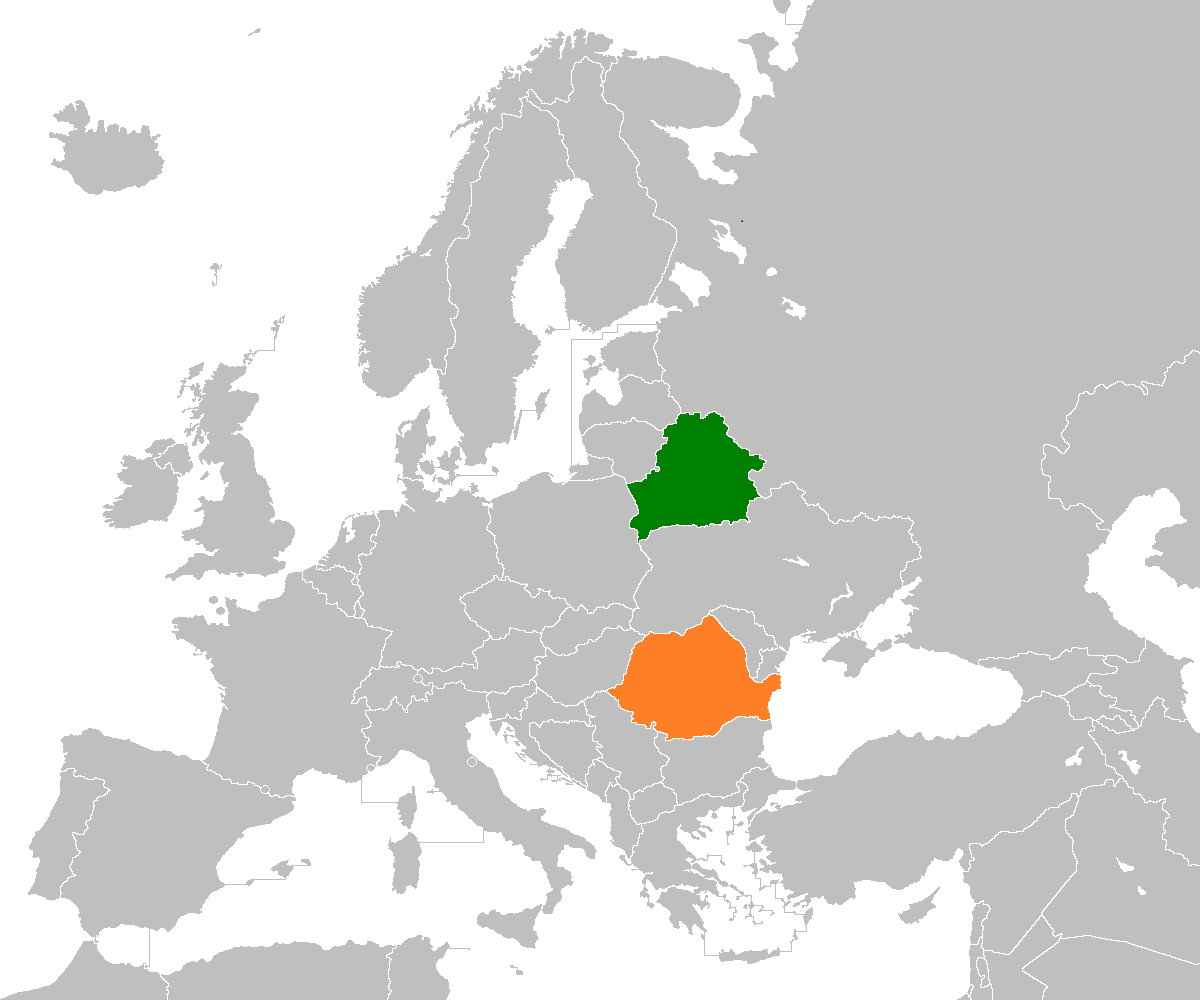

- Belarus: Romania

Belarus and Romania officially established diplomatic relations on 14 February 1992. Currently, Belarus has an embassy in Bucharest, while Romania has an embassy in Minsk.

== History ==
Romanian President Ion Iliescu visited Minsk both in July 1992 and March 1994, while Chairman Stanislav Shushkevich of Belarus visited Bucharest in May 1993 and April 1994.

Belarusian businessman Pavel Topuzidis is the honorary consul of Romania in Belarus.

=== 2020 Belarusian protests ===
In 2020, protests in Belarus against the outcome of the presidential elections of 9 August 2020 occurred. Two days later, the Romanian Ministry of Foreign Affairs Bogdan Aurescu said he was "very concerned" about the situation of the country and that the "only way" was to stop the violence and start a political dialogue. He also urged the country to respect fundamental human rights. Alexander Lukashenko, the president elected in the controversial 2020 elections, has been compared to the Romanian communist leader Nicolae Ceaușescu. The latter suffered a revolution against him in 1989, which ended with his capture and execution. Some have said that Lukashenko could end in the same way as him.

On August 14, three youth and student organizations condemned the Belarusian government for manipulating the elections and using violence. They urged Aurescu to defend the rights of civil society, "even through the adoption of sanctions". The three organizations were among the first in Romania to state their opinion on the matter. On 16 August, dozens of Romanians protested in front of the Belarusian embassy in Bucharest. They carried banners expressing their solidarity with the protestants, criticized the repression of the protests and expressed their desire for the elections to be repeated.

At the beginning of the incident, most Romanian politicians or government officials said nothing, usually waiting for statements from the European Union instead of reacting individually. An exception was the political party Save Romania Union (USR), whose MPs proposed a joint statement by the two houses of the Romanian Parliament on the situation in Belarus. The president of the USR, Dan Barna, described Lukashenko as "a Ceaușescu lookalike, who will eventually be removed from power". Furthermore, leaders of several European Parliament political parties, under the initiative of the Romanian politician Dacian Cioloș, called on 17 August for a repeat of the Belarusian elections. Russia was also asked to "refrain from any intervention".

In 19 August, the Romanian President Klaus Iohannis said that the European Union should take measures against the situation in Belarus, including sanctions against those involved in the use of violence against protesters and in the electoral fraud. He also called for the release of the persons that were illegally detained. On the same day, the European Council of the European Union (of which Romania is a member) declared that the 2020 elections were not fair or free and rejected its results.

In 24 August, an open letter was sent to Aurescu and Iohannis, as well as to the Prime Minister Ludovic Orban, to support civil society and human rights in Belarus. They compared the protests to the Romanian Revolution in 1989 and the Romanian protests of 2017–2019. Methods of torture committed in 1989 in Romania were also compared with those committed in 2020 in Belarus. The letter called on the Romanian government to take a firm position in favor of the rights of the Belarusian people, free elections, an end to torture and others. At the end of the letter, it urges the recipients to open communication channels with Sviatlana Tsikhanouskaya and the Coordination Council, to declare that Lukashenko is not recognized as president, to set a deadline for transfer of power to Tsikhanouskaya and to break diplomatic relations with Belarus in case Lukashenko does not cease the violent repression. The letter was signed by more than 200 political or cultural figures of Romania, including former Foreign Minister Andrei Plesu, writer Ana Blandiana, directors Cristian Mungiu and Adina Pintilie and the former political prisoner Radu Filipescu.

On 26 August, Aurescu announced on Twitter that the Romanian Ministry of Foreign Affairs was preparing to allocate 100,000 euros to support Belarusian civil society and independent media. The next day, he said before an informal European Union meeting that Romania is "very concerned" about the situation in Belarus and the abuses against protesters and the opposition and that the country supports "a full list of sanctions" against various Belarusian officials.

On 2 September, the Senate of Romania unanimously approved, after 124 votes in favor, to make a declaration regarding the violation of fundamental human rights in Belarus. The Romanian Parliament expressed solidarity with the Belarusian population, called for an end to violence to give place to peaceful protests and said that it believed that a "more articulate reaction" from the international community will be necessary in case the situation is not resolved. On 4 September, Aurescu confirmed that Romania would continue to call for an end to violence, for the beginning of a political dialogue and for respect of the human rights of the Belarusians. He also reiterated the intention to contribute 100,000 euros to Belarusian civil society and independent journalism and rejected the accusations of interference in the internal affairs of the country.

On 9 September, PEN Romania, together with other international PEN centers, signed a document calling for the release of political prisoners from Belarus. It also criticized Lukasenko's repressive policies. Furthermore, on the same day, several diplomats from the European Union stayed at the home of the Belarusian writer Svetlana Alexievich, who is a member of the Coordination Council, to avoid her arrest. Among the diplomats were representatives from Romania, as well as Austria, Czech Republic, Lithuania, Poland, Slovakia and Sweden.

== See also ==
- Foreign relations of Belarus
- Foreign relations of Romania
- Belarus-NATO relations
- Belarus-EU relations
