= Belarus–Netherlands relations =

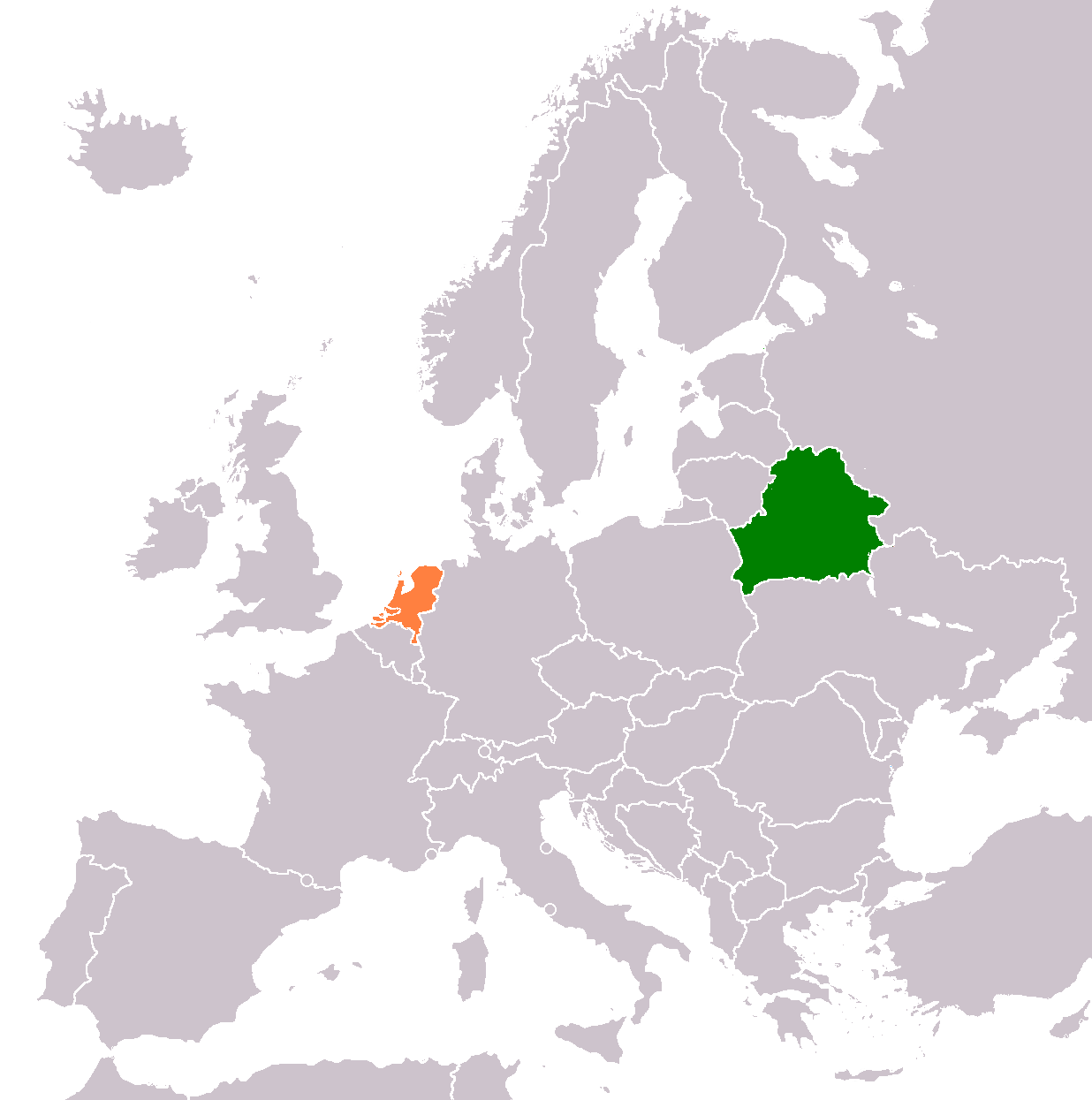

- Belarus: Netherlands

Belarus and the Netherlands established diplomatic relations in 1994. Belarus has an embassy and an honorary consulate in The Hague. The Netherlands is represented in Belarus through its embassy in Warsaw (Poland) and through an honorary consulate in Minsk. Both countries are full members of the Organization for Security and Co-operation in Europe.

There is no direct contact between the two countries at the government level, since the European Union decided in 1997 that such a level of contact lends legitimacy to a government the EU deems not democratically elected. On Dutch request, the European Union decided in October 2008 to soften the visa restrictions; certain other restrictions remain, such as the freezing of Belarus financial assets, and the Dutch government objects to the normalization of relations between Belarus and the European Union.

The Dutch opposed to inviting president Alexander Lukashenko to attend a summit in May 2009 in Vienna, where the program was to be launched; such an invitation, Dutch Minister of Foreign Affairs Maxime Verhagen contends, "would trivialize his dismal human rights record."

While there are no direct governmental contacts, and the Dutch Ministry of Foreign Affairs says there are no "intensive cultural relations" between the two countries (in fact, Belarus does not even qualify for Dutch financial assistance), there does exist relations between the two countries on various levels.

== Assistance to Belarusian children ==
For many years children suffering from the consequences of the Chernobyl disaster had been vacationing abroad, about 1500 to 2000 annually came to the Netherlands. In 2008, Belarus refused to give visa to those children after a 16-year-old Belarus girl had applied for asylum in the United States; Belarus also claimed that some children had not returned from vacations in the United States and Italy. Stichting Rusland Kinderhulp, the organization responsible for the housing of those children in the Netherlands, exerted pressure on the Belarus embassy in The Hague to re-open the borders. An announcement was made around Christmas 2008 that, after months of negotiations between the two countries, a group of children were allowed to spend Christmas in the Netherlands and that the travel ban was postponed until 20 January 2009.

== Reaction to 2006 Belarusian presidential election ==
Events surrounding the 2006 Belarusian presidential election, which were widely criticized by European countries and the US, have added tension to already difficult relationships between the countries. A few Dutch politicians who were to have observed the elections but whose visa were revoked, protested at the Belarus border.

The fallout from the elections led to the arrest of many Belarusian students, and some of them lost their passports. A request by a Dutch political party to the Dutch government to relax passport requirements for such students was denied by the Dutch Minister of Integration and Immigration, Rita Verdonk, though Verdonk did promise to exert political pressure on the Belarus government if they refused to grant travel permits to those students. The Netherlands did attempt to pressure the Belarus government; for example, the Dutch foreign minister convinced the European Union that a planned Interpol summit planned to take place in Minsk be boycotted. Groups in the Netherlands, meanwhile, protest what they call the lack of political and religious freedom in Belarus.

== Resident diplomatic missions ==
- Belarus has an embassy in The Hague.
- the Netherlands is accredited to Belarus from its embassy in Warsaw, Poland and a embassy office in Minsk.

== See also ==
- Foreign relations of Belarus
- Foreign relations of the Netherlands
- Belarus-NATO relations
- Belarus–EU relations
