= Belarus–Syria relations =

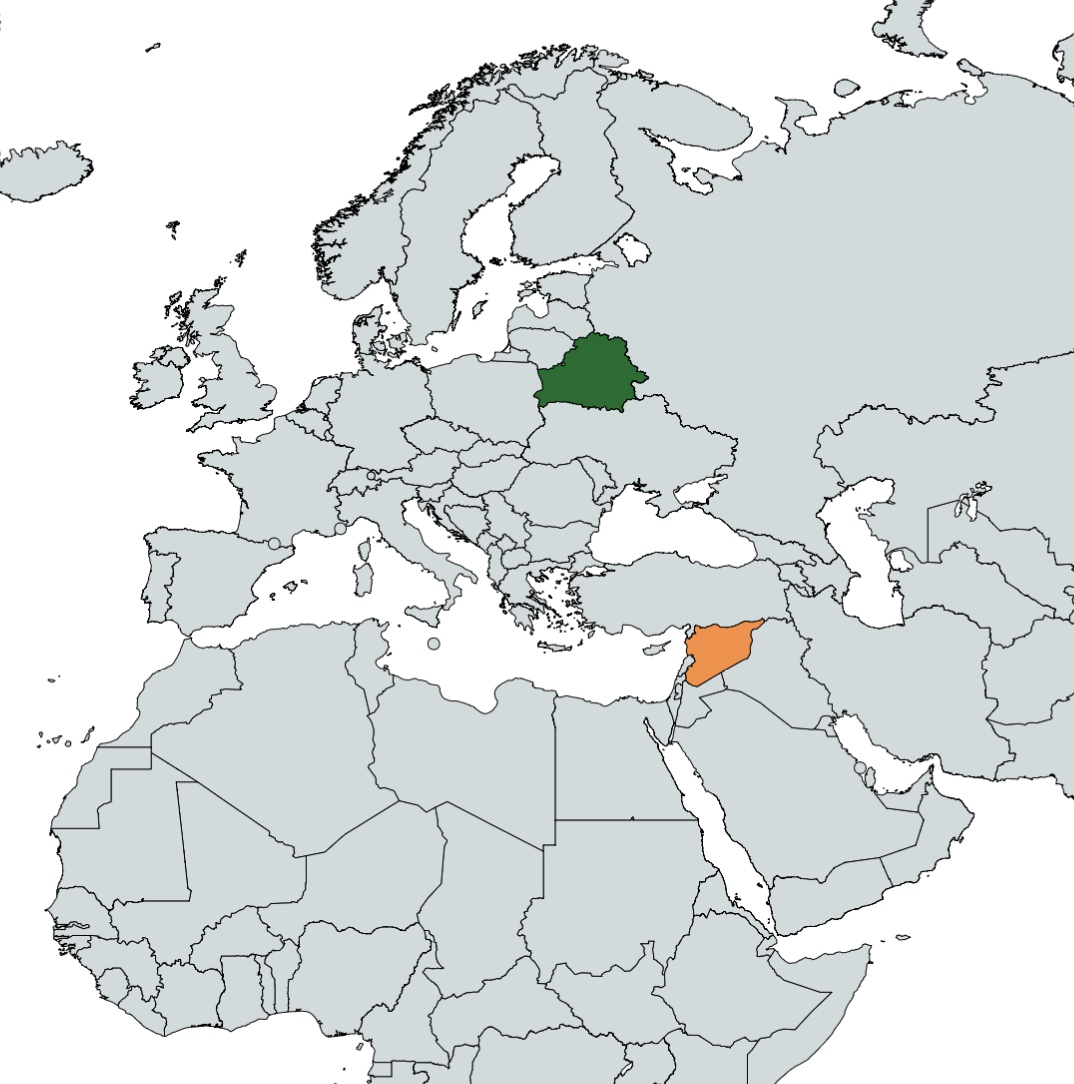

- Belarus: Syria

Belarus–Syria relations refer to the relationship between Belarus and Syria. Both countries established diplomatic relations in 1992. Belarus has an embassy in Damascus and Syria has an embassy in Minsk.

== History ==
In 2007, Ba'athist Syria was one of 33 countries to vote against a United Nations General Assembly resolution titled "Situation of human rights in Belarus".

On July 26, 2010, Syrian President Bashar al-Assad visited Minsk. Assad has supported President Alexander Lukashenko, and Lukashenko has supported Assad in the Syrian Civil War.

In 2023, Belarus was among ten countries to join Syria in voting against a resolution that would establish an independent body to determine what happened to more than 130,000 people missing as a result of the conflict in Syria.

=== Russian invasion of Ukraine ===
In 2014, Ba'athist Syria and Belarus were among 11 countries to vote against United Nations General Assembly Resolution 68/262 which would recognize Crimea as the territorial integrity of Ukraine.

Both Belarus and Ba'athist Syria supported the Russian invasion of Ukraine.

=== Fall of the Ba'athist regime ===
After the fall of the al-Assad regime, Belarus withdrew its diplomatic personnel from Syria on 15 December 2024.

On January 23, the Belarusian Foreign Minister Maxim Ryzhenkov visited Syria and met with de facto President of Syria Ahmed al-Sharaa.

== See also ==
- Foreign relations of Belarus
- Foreign relations of Syria
