= Belarus–Croatia relations =

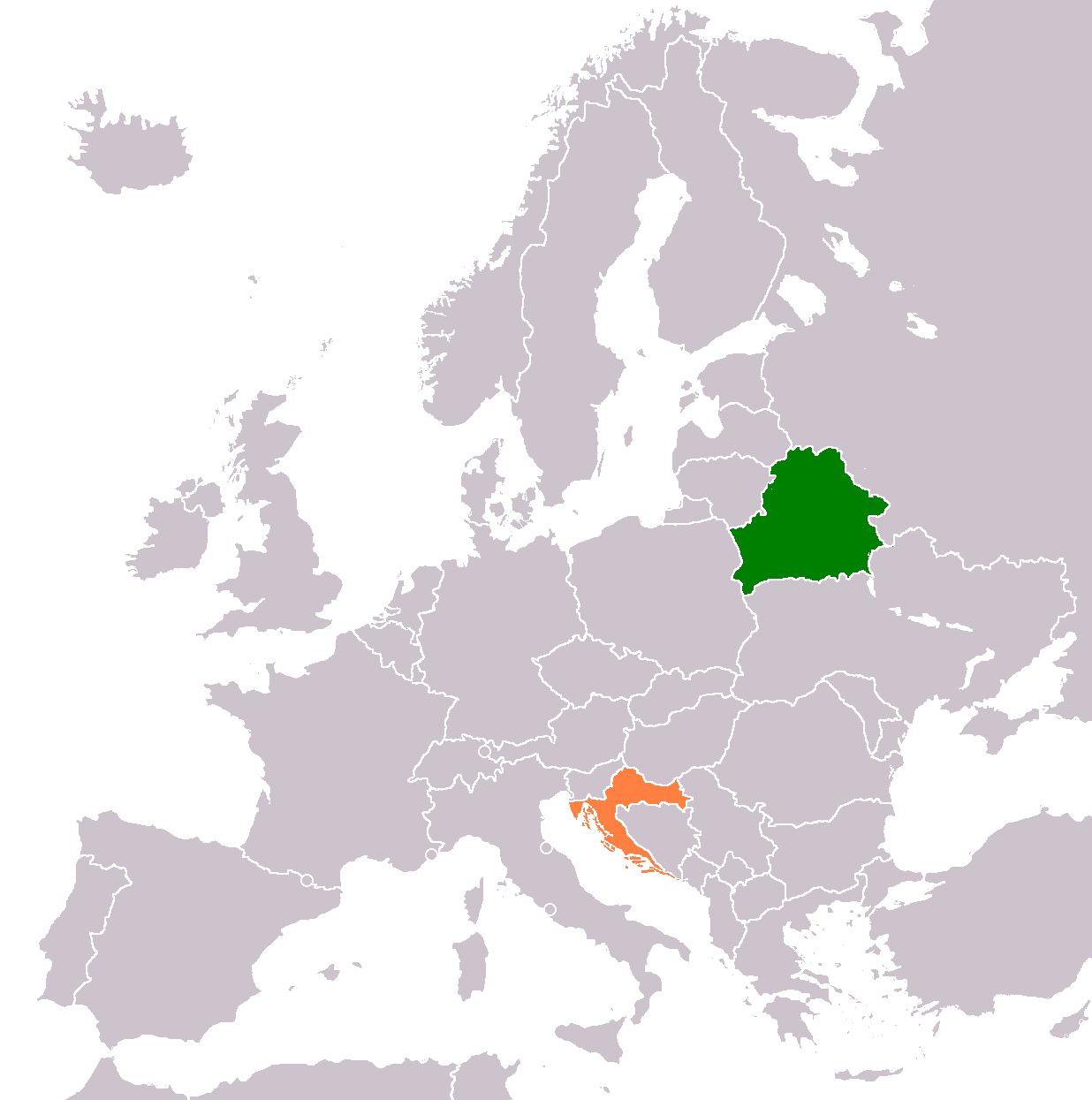

- Belarus: Croatia

Croatia and Belarus established diplomatic relations on 22 September 1992. Though geographically not very close, Croatia and Belarus are both Slavic countries and thus share certain cultural and linguistic similarities.

Croatia is represented in Belarus through its embassy in Moscow (Russia), while Belarus is represented in Croatia through its embassy in Budapest (Hungary).

== Relations ==
Mutual recognition occurred on 2 September 1992. Croatian and Belarus signed bilateral treaties on the promotion and reciprocal protection of investments in 2001, for the avoidance of double taxation and prevention of tax evasion on income and capital in 2003, on international road transport in 2005, on cooperation in the field of tourism in 2010 and many others.

Apostolic Nuncio in Belarus from 2004 to 2011 was the Croatian Bishop Martin Vidović.

== Economic relations ==
Economic cooperation between Croatia and Belarus is good. In 2012, Belarus exported to Croatia goods worth $41.9 million and imported from it goods worth $14 million.

== See also ==
- Foreign relations of Belarus
- Foreign relations of Croatia
- Belarus-NATO relations
- Belarus-EU relations
- Soviet Union–Yugoslavia relations
