= Belarus–Czech Republic relations =

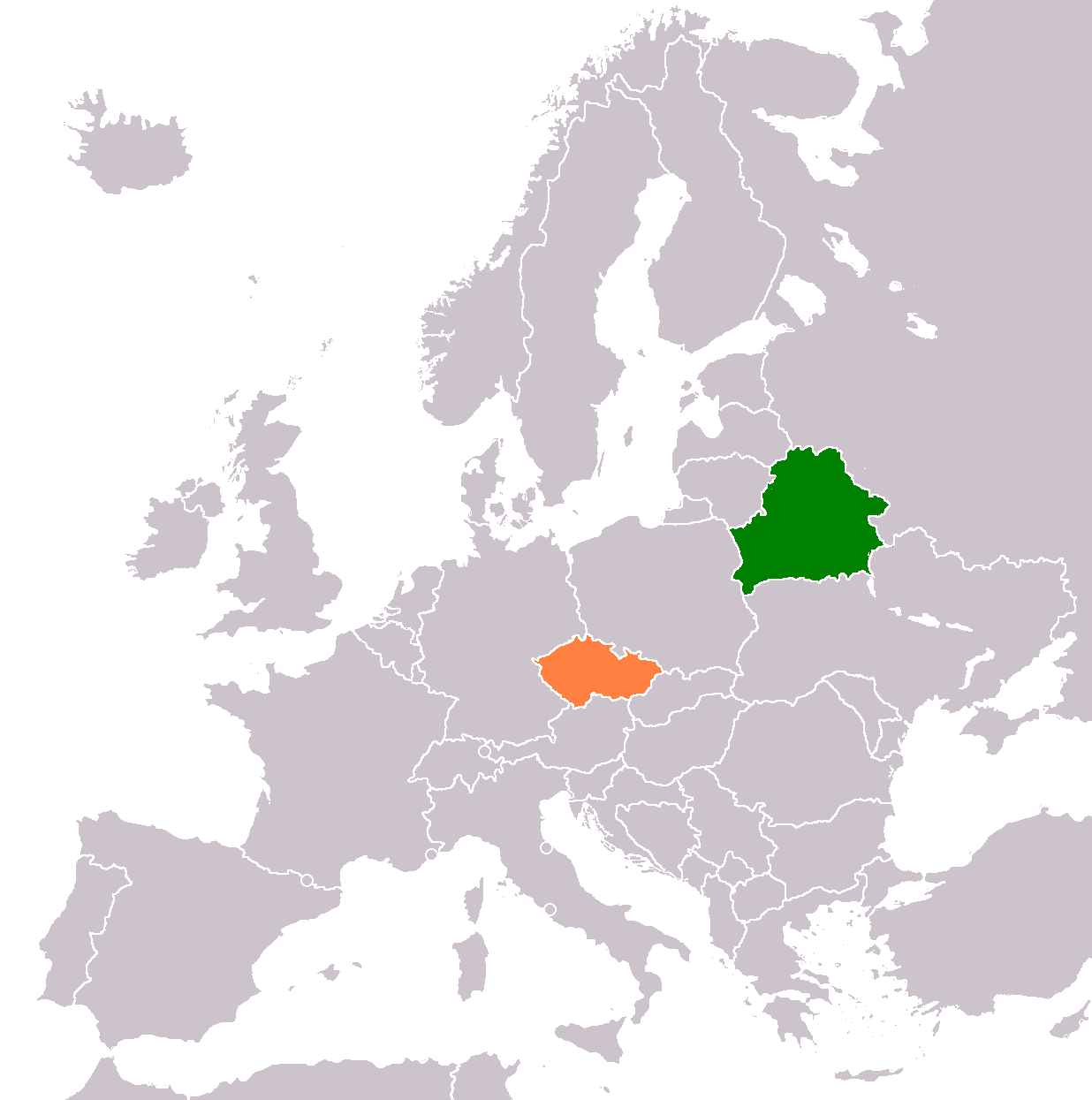

- Belarus: Czech Republic

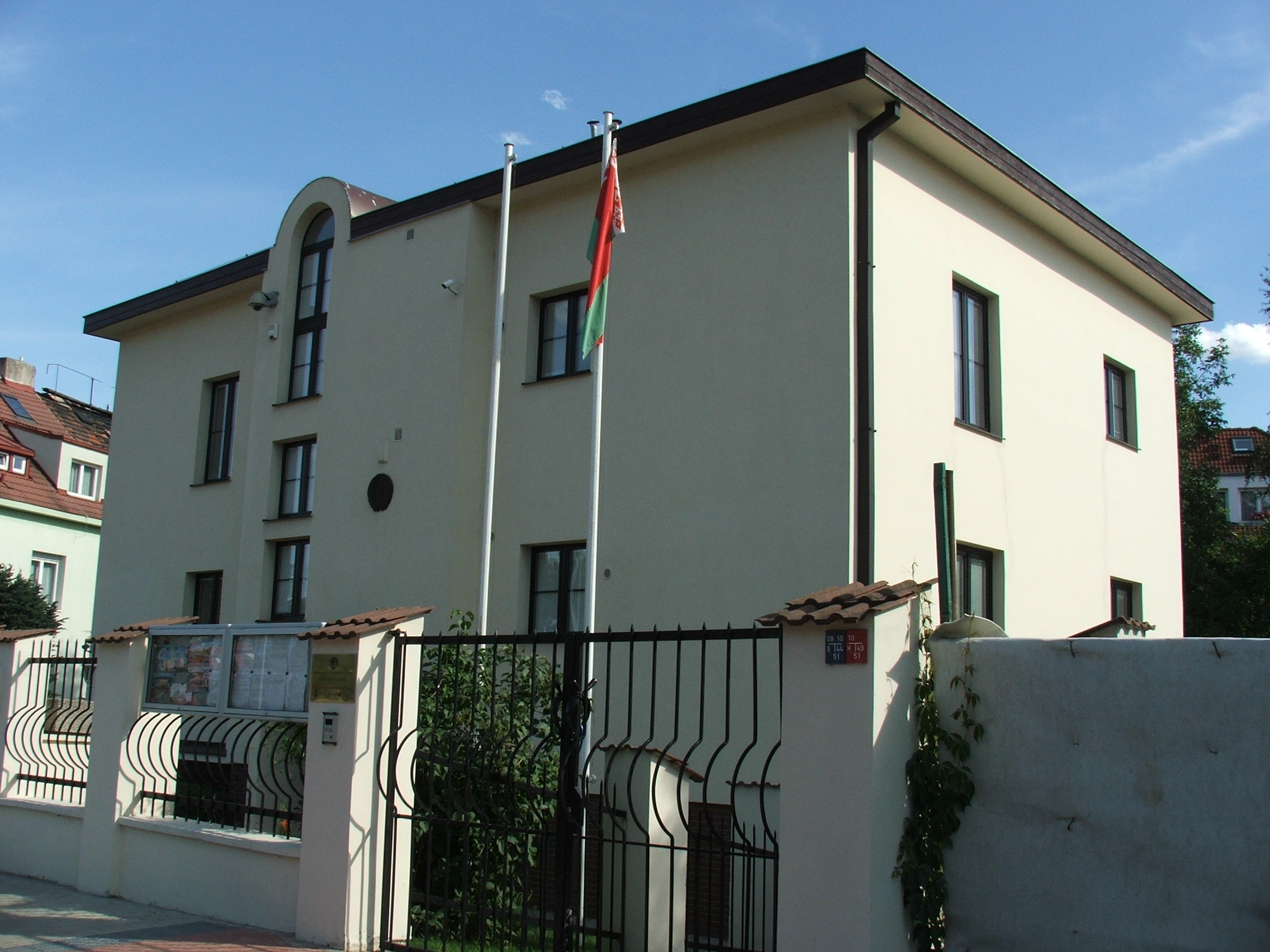
Belarusian embassy in Prague

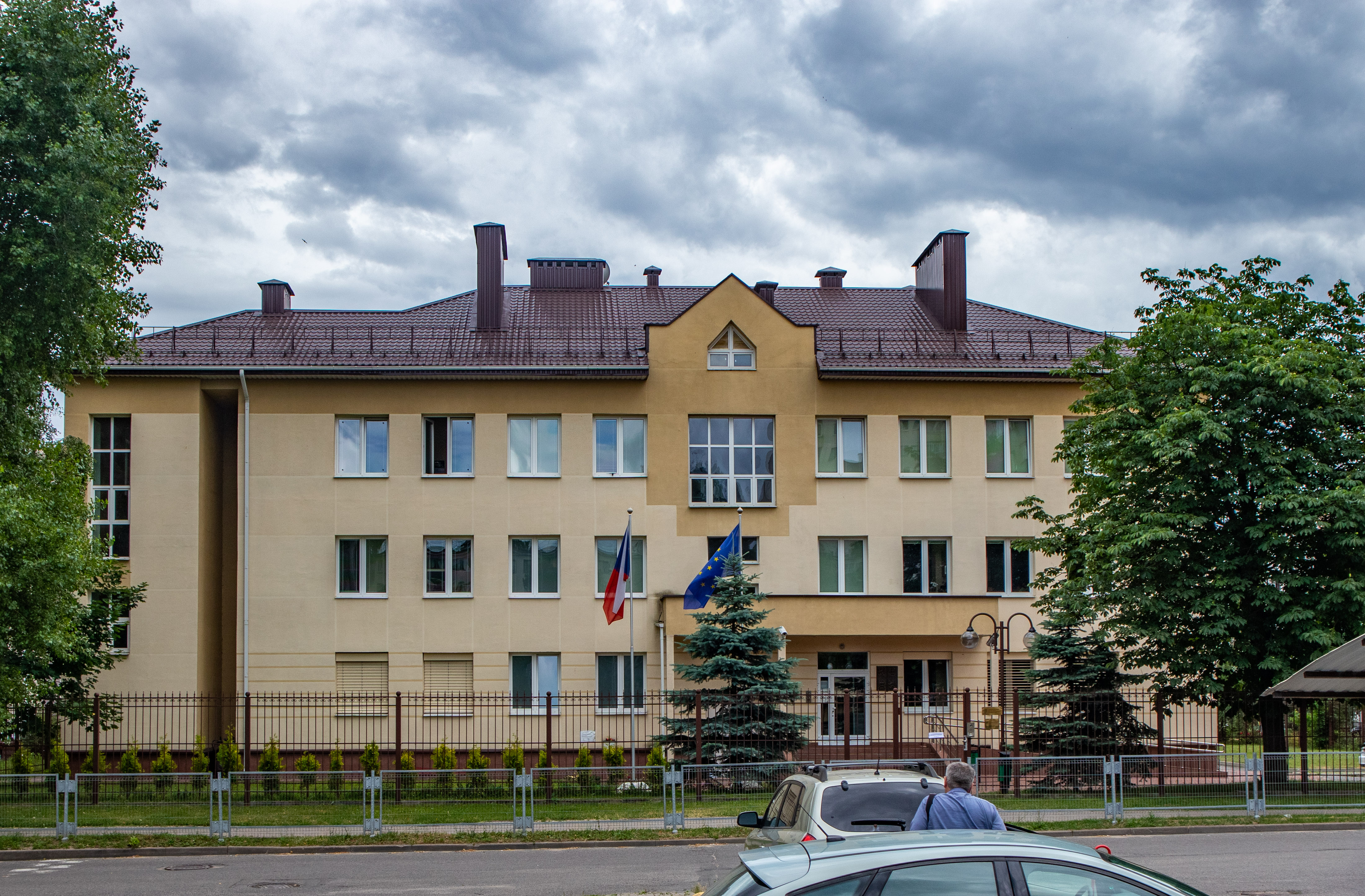
Czech embassy in Minsk

Belarus and the Czech Republic established diplomatic relations in 1993. Belarus has an embassy in Prague. The Czech Republic has an embassy in Minsk.

Both countries are full members of the Organization for Security and Co-operation in Europe.

In October 2020, Czech Republic and other countries recalled their ambassadors from Belarus following disputed presidential elections.

In May 2021, Czech Republic suspended flights between the two countries after Belarus' air hijacking. The country also set up an office in Prague for the Belarusian opposition. Foreign Minister Jakub Kulhánek stated, "The Belarusian opposition has and will have the unequivocal support of the Czech Republic."

== See also ==
- Foreign relations of Belarus
- Foreign relations of the Czech Republic
- Belarus-NATO relations
- Belarus–EU relations
