= Belarus–India relations =

- Belarus: India

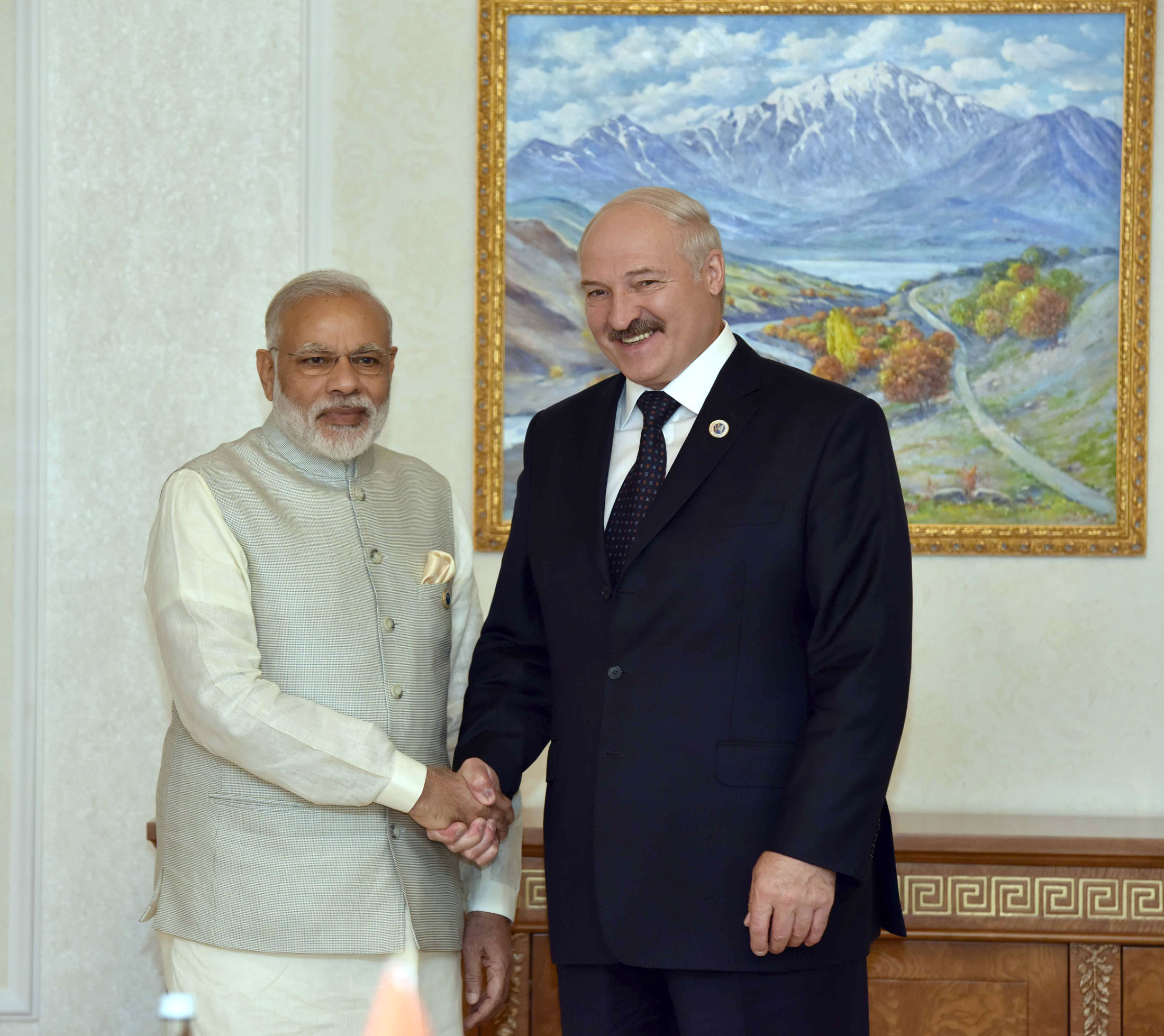
Indian Prime Minister Narendra Modi and Belarus President Alexander Lukashenko.

Belarus–India relations are the bilateral ties between India and Belarus. Belarus has an embassy in New Delhi whilst India has an embassy in Minsk. Both countries are members of the Non Aligned Movement.

== History ==
Both India (British Raj) and Byelorussia were the founding members of the United Nations. India was one of the first few countries to recognise Belarus' independence in 1991. The India embassy in Minsk opened in 1992, and with the first Resident Ambassador joining in January 1993. The Belarusian embassy in New Delhi opened in 1998.

== Energy Cooperation ==
India has participated in the reconstruction of power facilities in Belarus for energy generation and transmission. An Indian company Bharat Heavy Electricals worked on similar project in the Grodno power plant. Other agreements include exploration of energy resources in Belarus and in electrical equipment.

== Economic relations ==
MoUs have been signed in the field of Trade and Commerce. Belarus has Potash mines which is used in pharmaceutical and fertilizer industry which is big part of India imports. A MoU was signed between Bureau of Indian Standards and Belarus' State Committee for Standardization to cooperate in the field of standardization. Some others include that on broadcasting, textiles, manufacturing and defense. India and Belarus also have set a trade target of US$1 Billion, to be achieved by 2018. India is also involved in seeking investment and resources through Belarusian route for developing smart cities. Other terms include improving the manufacturing sector and increasing skill development and considering the Swachh Bharat Abhiyan by improving sanitation and cleanliness. The India CIS Chambers of Commerce and Industry was formed to devise correct policies and monitor the trade relations between the CIS states including Belarus and India.

In June 2025, Indian Defence Minister Rajnath Singh met his Belarusian counterpart Viktor Khrenin on the sidelines of the SCO Defence Ministers' conclave in Qingdao, China. The two discussed strengthening bilateral defence cooperation and enhancing regional security.

The meeting underscored the strategic value of the India–Belarus partnership, particularly in defence manufacturing, technology exchange, and military training. Belarus remains a key partner in India’s efforts to diversify its defence ties and boost indigenous capabilities.

Singh called the interaction “enriching,” reaffirming India's commitment to deepening engagement with Eurasian partners. He also held separate talks with Russian Defence Minister Andrey Belousov, focusing on the evolving regional security scenario.

== Other Inclinations ==
Belarus supports India at the NSG (Nuclear Suppliers Group) and for the permanent membership in United Nations Security Council. India supports Belarus for its membership in the NAM (Non-Aligned Movement) and in IPU (Inter-Parliamentary Union).

== State visits ==
During the visit of Pranab Mukherjee, the president of India, in June 2015, many agreements were signed which include exchange of students and promotion of tourism. It also included science & technology cooperation.

== Culture and education ==
The cultural relations between both countries were established from the time when Belarus was part of Soviet Union. India's national poet Rabindranath Tagore visited Minsk in 1931 where he met with other intellectuals. The musician, Nicholas Nabokov, visited India in the 1960s and was impressed by India's musical traditions.

Religion

Hindu religion believers in Belarus face problems exercising their freedom of religion rights. According to United States Department of State, Belarusian International Society for Krishna Consciousness (ISKCON) activists fear to register their communities because of possible fraud and revenge from authorities. In 2003, activists of Belarusian branch of ISKCON issued a statement against defamation of their religion in Belarusian school textbook. ISKCON communities were accused of fooling the believers (an offensive word "making-blockhead" was used in the textbook), and it was stated that Krishnaite believers need a psychiatrist assistance to return to "real life". In 2016, ISKCON activist in Homiel was fined for outdoor religious activity. According to Human Rights Watch, arbitrary arrests of ISKCON activists and other Hinduists are regular.

In July 2021, Belarusian authorities launched an attack on non-governmental organizations, and among NGOs forcibly closed by Ministry of justice was "Vedanta vada" (Russian: Веданта вада) Hinduist cultural and educational organization. "Vedanta vada" was based in Mahilioŭ and was active in promoting Indian culture and religion.
