= Embassy of Belarus, London =

Embassy of Belarus in London
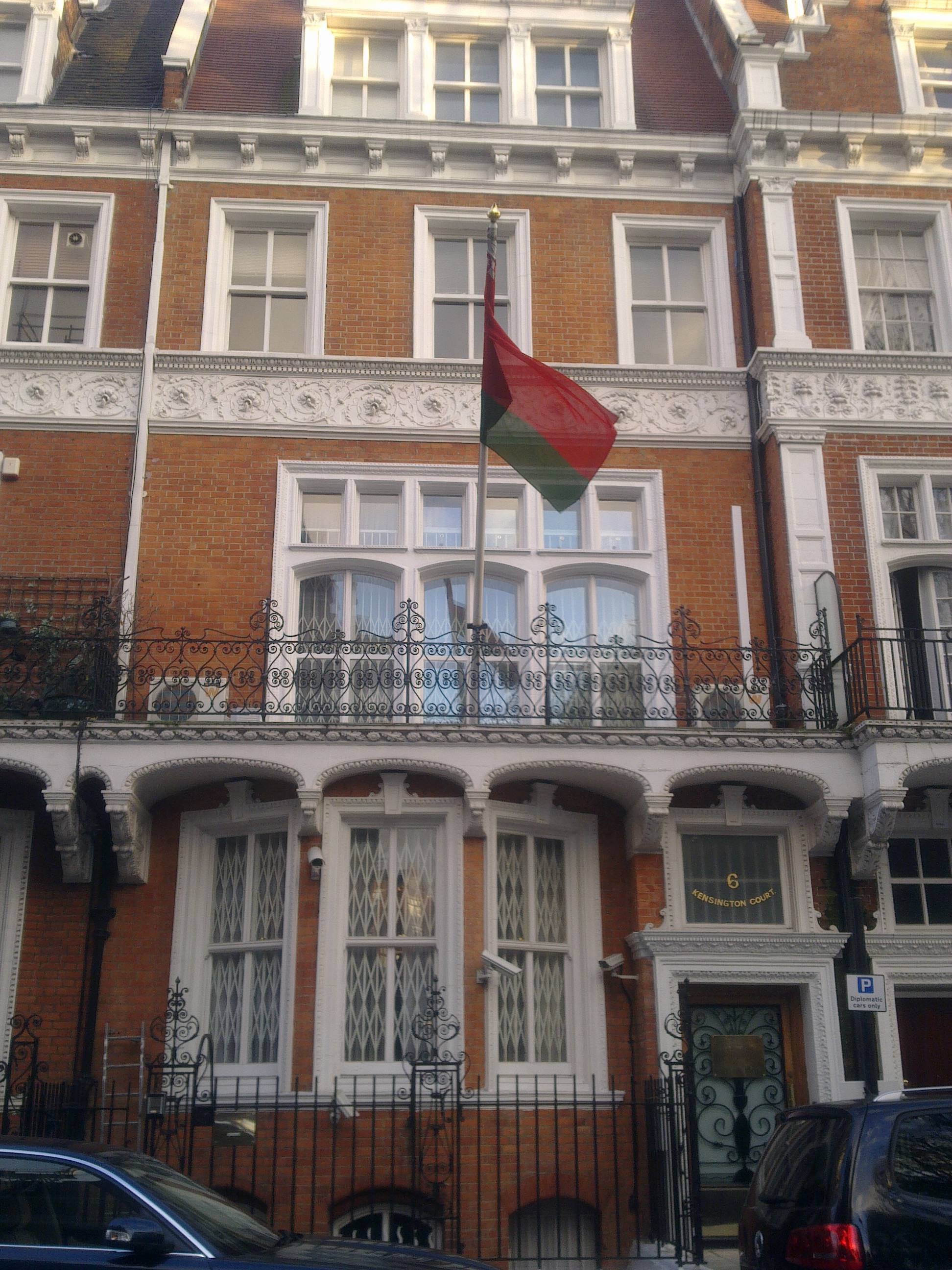
- Location: South Kensington, London
- Address: 6 Kensington Court, London, W8 5DL
- Coordinates: 51.501581°N 0.186720°W
- Ambassador: Maxim Yermalovich

The Embassy of Belarus in London is the diplomatic mission of Belarus in the United Kingdom. It is situated just south of Kensington Gardens between the Embassy of Azerbaijan and the Embassy of Mongolia.

Britain and Belarus established diplomatic relations in 1992 shortly after Belarus regained independence; a consular general was set up in 1993. The Belarusian diaspora in the UK provided the newly established consular-general and embassy with a building at 1 St Stephen's Crescent. In 1994 the Consulate General was transformed into the Embassy of the Republic of Belarus in the United Kingdom of Great Britain and Northern Ireland. The first Ambassador of Belarus to the UK was HE Mr. Vladimir Senko.

Political Dialog. During the first years of the development of relations between Belarus and the UK quite an intensive political dialogue was established. The Chairman of the Supreme Council of the Republic of Belarus (December 1994) and the Prime Minister of the Republic of Belarus (May, 1995) visited London. Several working visits of the Deputy Prime Ministers to the UK were organised. Contacts at municipal level were established.

On June 14, 1996, the United Kingdom of Great Britain and Northern Ireland was one of the first in the European Union to ratify the Partnership and Cooperation Agreement between Belarus and the EU.

Due to mutual interest of the countries in cooperation in a number of essentially important spheres, contacts on interdepartmental level are maintained; inter-regional and business interaction between the two countries is developed.

On November 18, 2008, the first Belarus Investment Forum took place in London. On November 16-19th, 2008 within the framework of the Forum a delegation headed by Belarus Prime Minister Sergei Sidorsky visited London.

On February 18, 2013, the Ambassador Extraordinary and Plenipotentiary of the Republic of Belarus to the United Kingdom of Great Britain and Northern Ireland HE Mr. Sergei Aleinik presented the copies of his Credentials to the Vice Marshal of the Diplomatic Corps, Director of Protocol.

On June 5, 2013, at the Royal London Residence – the Buckingham Palace – HE Mr. Sergei Aleinik presented his Credentials to the Queen Elizabeth II.

On 8 – 10 September 2013, HE Alena Kupchyna, Deputy Minister of Foreign Affairs of the Republic of Belarus paid a working visit to the United Kingdom. During the visit Deputy Minister A.Kupchina had meetings with the Rt Hon David Lidington MP, Minister of State for Europe of the Foreign Commonwealth Office.

On 9 February 2016, Minister of Foreign Affairs of the Republic of Belarus, Vladimir Makei, met with the Director General for Political Affairs of the Foreign and Commonwealth Office of the United Kingdom of Great Britain and Northern Ireland, Simon Gass during his visit to Belarus.

In October 2016, a visit of Prince Michael of Kent to Belarus took place, during which he was received by President Alexander Lukashenko.

On January 27, 2017, there was an exchange of Protocol messages of the Ministers of Foreign Affairs of the two countries on the occasion of the 25th anniversary of the establishment of diplomatic relations between the Republic of Belarus and the UK.

On September 25–26, 2017, Minister of State for Europe and the Americas of the British Foreign Office, Sir Alan Duncan, visited the Republic of Belarus. The British high representative was received by the Head of State, held talks with the Minister of Foreign Affairs of the Republic of Belarus. The sides noted the constructive nature of the discussions, outlined ways of further development of cooperation between the two countries, including in the context of the British exit from the EU in 2019.

The year 2017 saw the intensification of the Belarusian British inter-parliamentary dialogue. Both parliaments have established relevant country groups.

27 – 28 March 2018 Minister for Foreign Affairs of the Republic of Belarus Vladimir Makei paid his official visit to the United Kingdom of Great Britain and Northern Ireland. This is the first since 1993 visit of Belarus’ Foreign Minister to the UK.

During the visit, Vladimir Makei met with the Secretary of State for Foreign and Commonwealth Affairs Boris Johnson to discuss the prospects for the development of bilateral relations in the context of the current situation in the European region, including the withdrawal of Britain from the EU. It was noted that the Sides are interested in further development of bilateral relations in all areas, as well as in promoting initiatives that would be aimed at easing tensions in the region.

Talks were held on a wide range of political and economic issues with Minister of State for Europe and the Americas Alan Duncan and Minister of State for Trade Policy Greg Hands. As a result of official meetings, official documents were signed: MoU on trade and economic cooperation, which provides for the establishment of a Commercial Dialogue between the Governments to develop greater mutual trade and investment between the two countries, and MoU on customs cooperation.

== Gallery ==
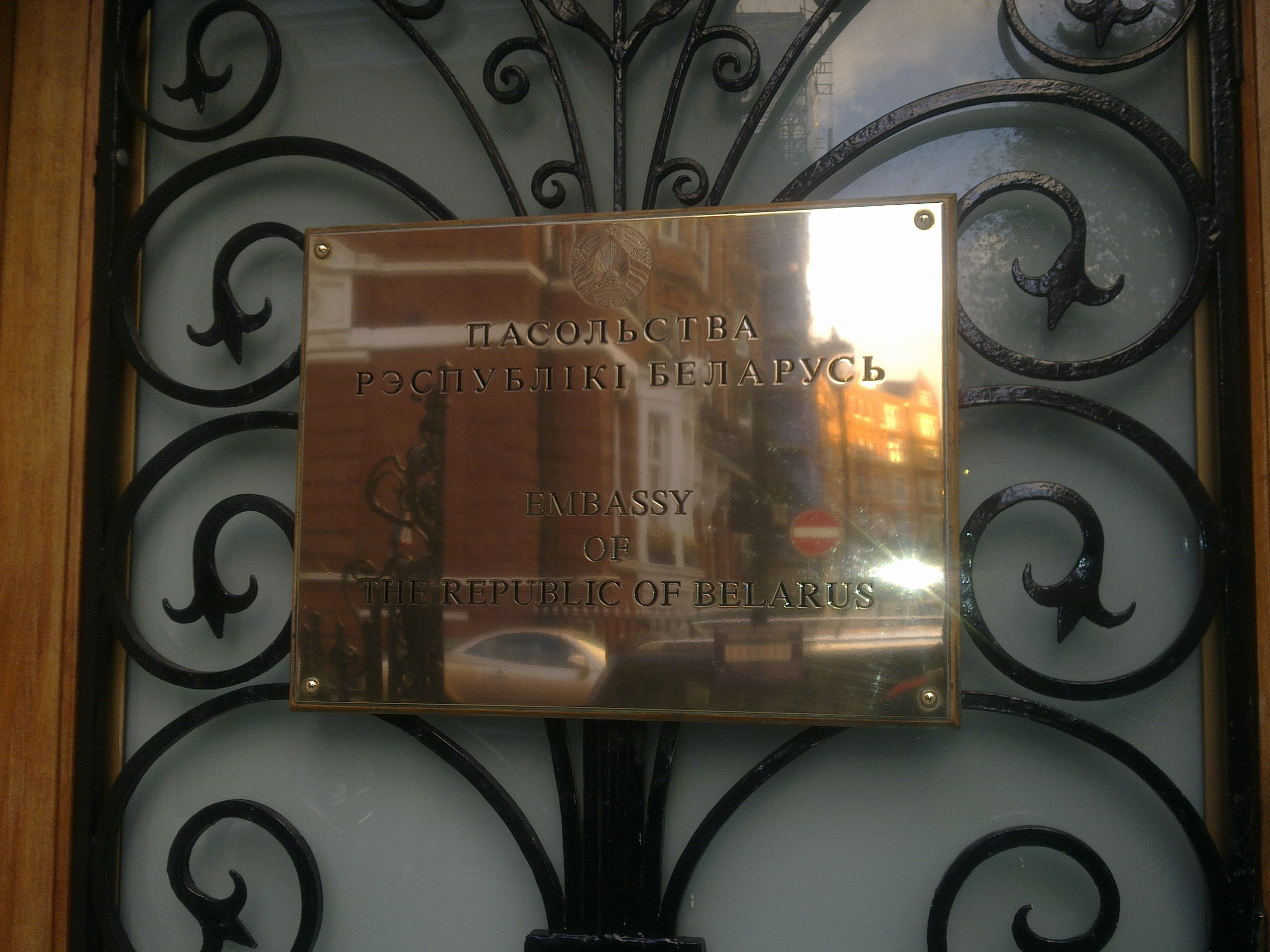
Plaque outside the embassy in Belarusian and English depicting the National emblem of Belarus

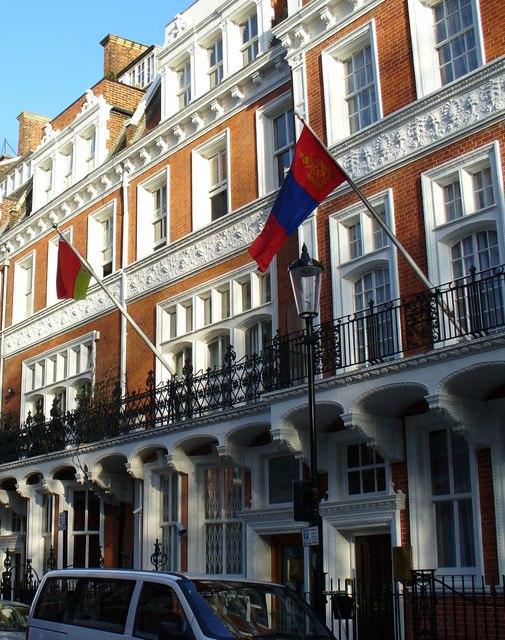
The embassies of Belarus and Mongolia
