= Belarus–Mexico relations =

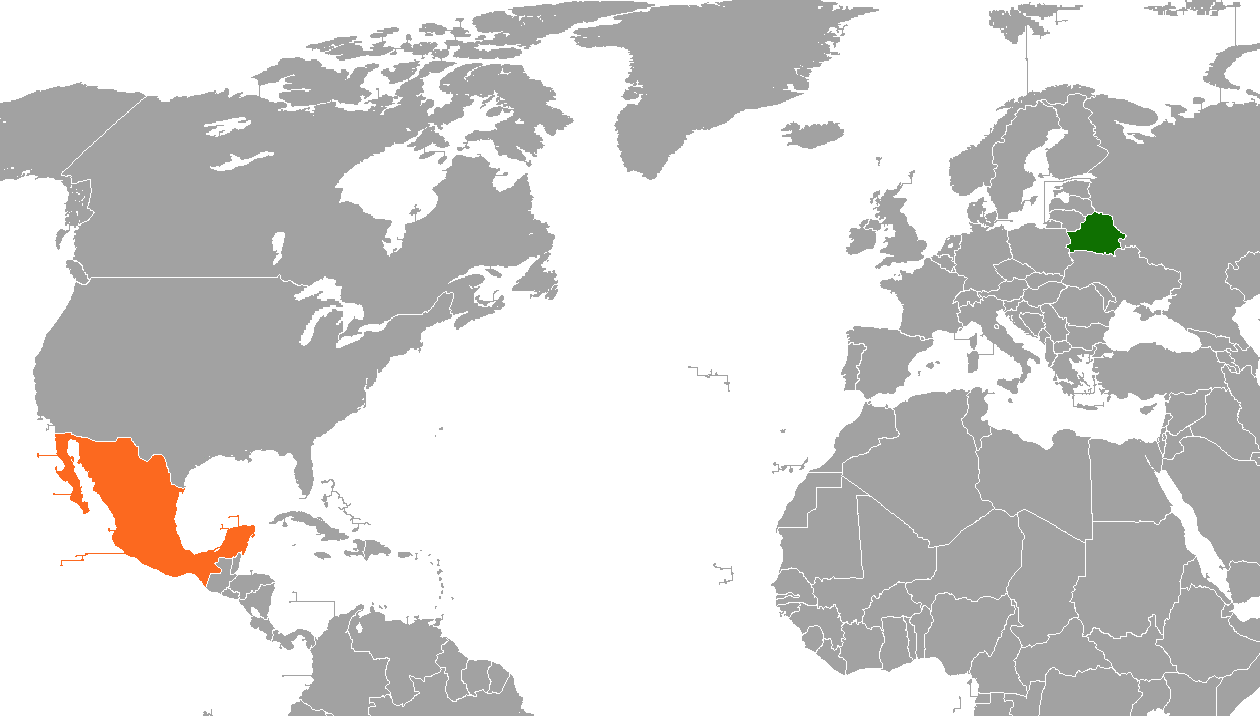

- Belarus: Mexico

The nations of Belarus and Mexico established diplomatic relations in 1992. Both nations are members of the United Nations.

== History ==
In the late 19th century and early 20th century, several hundred migrants, primarily Jewish, arrived to Mexico from regions of what is now modern-day Belarus. In December 1922, Belarus became part of the Soviet Union. On 26 December 1991, Belarus regained independence after the Dissolution of the Soviet Union and in January 1992 Belarus and Mexico established diplomatic relations. Since the establishment of diplomatic relations; relations between both nations have been limited and mainly take place in multilateral reunions such as at the United Nations.

In December 2007, the United Nations General Assembly held a vote on the Situation of Human rights in Belarus with regards to the 2006 Belarusian presidential election and its aftermath. Mexico abstained from voting on the resolution. In September 2008, Belarus and Mexico signed an Agreement for the Promotion and Reciprocal Protection of Investments. The agreement was signed in Minsk by the Belarusian Foreign Vice-Minister Viktor A. Gaisenok and the Mexican Ministry of the Economy Undersecretary Carlos Arce Macías. That same year, an Agreement on the Establishment of a Joint Economic Commission was also signed between both nations.

In June 2015, head of the America Department of the Belarusian Ministry of Foreign Affairs, Oleg Kravchenko, paid an official visit to Mexico City where he held meetings with Deputy of the Mexican Congress, head of the Mexico-Belarus Friendship Group, as well as with the Mexican Senate Foreign Affairs Committee. The purpose of Mr. Kravchenko's visit was to foster the strengthening of bilateral inter-parliamentary relations between both nations. In March 2016, Mexico opened its first honorary consulate in Minsk. During the opening ceremony, Mexican Ambassador to Russia (and accredited to Belarus) Rubén Beltrán Guerrero led the ceremony along with Belarusian Foreign Vice-Minister Evgueni Shestakov.

In March 2022, Mexico voted in favor of United Nations General Assembly Resolution ES-11/1. The resolution deplored Russia's invasion of Ukraine and confirmed the involvement of Belarus in the invasion. In November of that same year, a 'Friendship Group' was installed in the Mexican Chamber of Deputies with the goal to develop and promote cultural, technological, industrial and agricultural exchanges and for both nations to explore the possibility of opening resident embassies in their respective capitals.

Over the past several years, Belarusian migrants have been fleeing to Mexico and traveling to the U.S. border seeking asylum for fear of persecution in their country. Most of the migrants wait in Mexico until their asylum petitions are accepted.

== High-level visits ==
High-level visits from Belarus to Mexico

- Ambassador and Envoy Sergey Ling (2002)
- Minister of Natural Resources Vladimir Tsalko (2010)
- Ministry of Foreign Affairs Head of the Americas Department Oleg Kravchenko (2015)
- House Representative Sergei Kosevich (2022)

High-level visits from Mexico to Belarus

- Undersecretary of the Economy Carlos Arce Macías (2008)

== Bilateral Agreements ==
Both nations have signed a few bilateral agreements such as an Agreement on the Establishment of a Joint Economic Commission (2008) and an Agreement for the Promotion and Reciprocal Protection of Investments (2008).

== Trade ==
In 2023, trade between Belarus and Mexico totaled US$63.3 million. Belarus' main exports to Mexico include: brass-plated steel, tires, potassium chloride and band saw blades. Mexico's main exports to Belarus include: malt beer, tequila, and casing tubes. Mexican multinational company América Móvil operates in Belarus under the operation of A1 Telekom Austria Group.

== Diplomatic missions ==
- Belarus is accredited to Mexico from its embassy in Havana, Cuba and maintains an honorary consulate in Mexico City.
- Mexico is accredited to Belarus from its embassy in Moscow, Russia and maintains an honorary consulate in Minsk.
