= Belarus–Estonia relations =

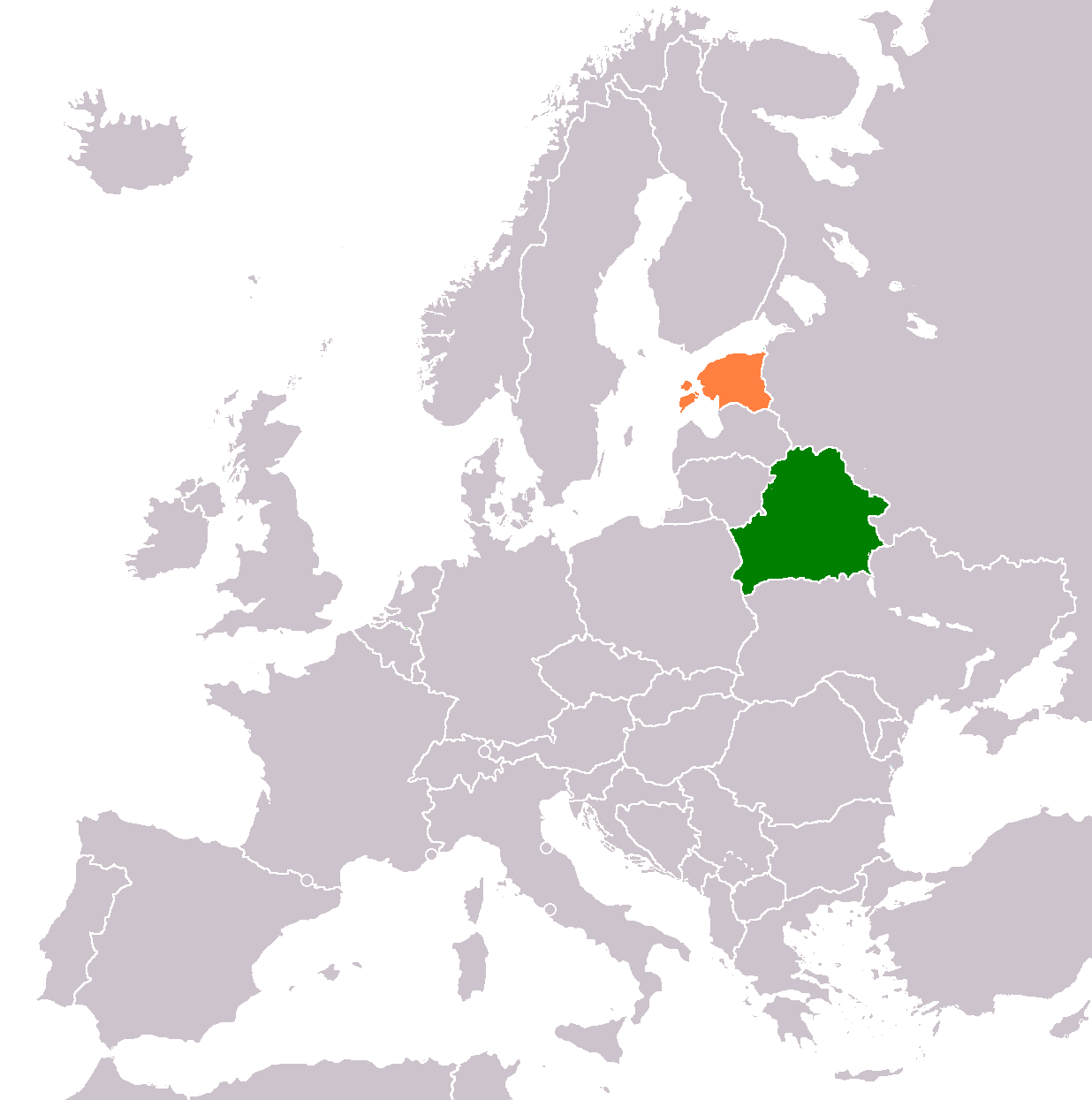

- Belarus: Estonia

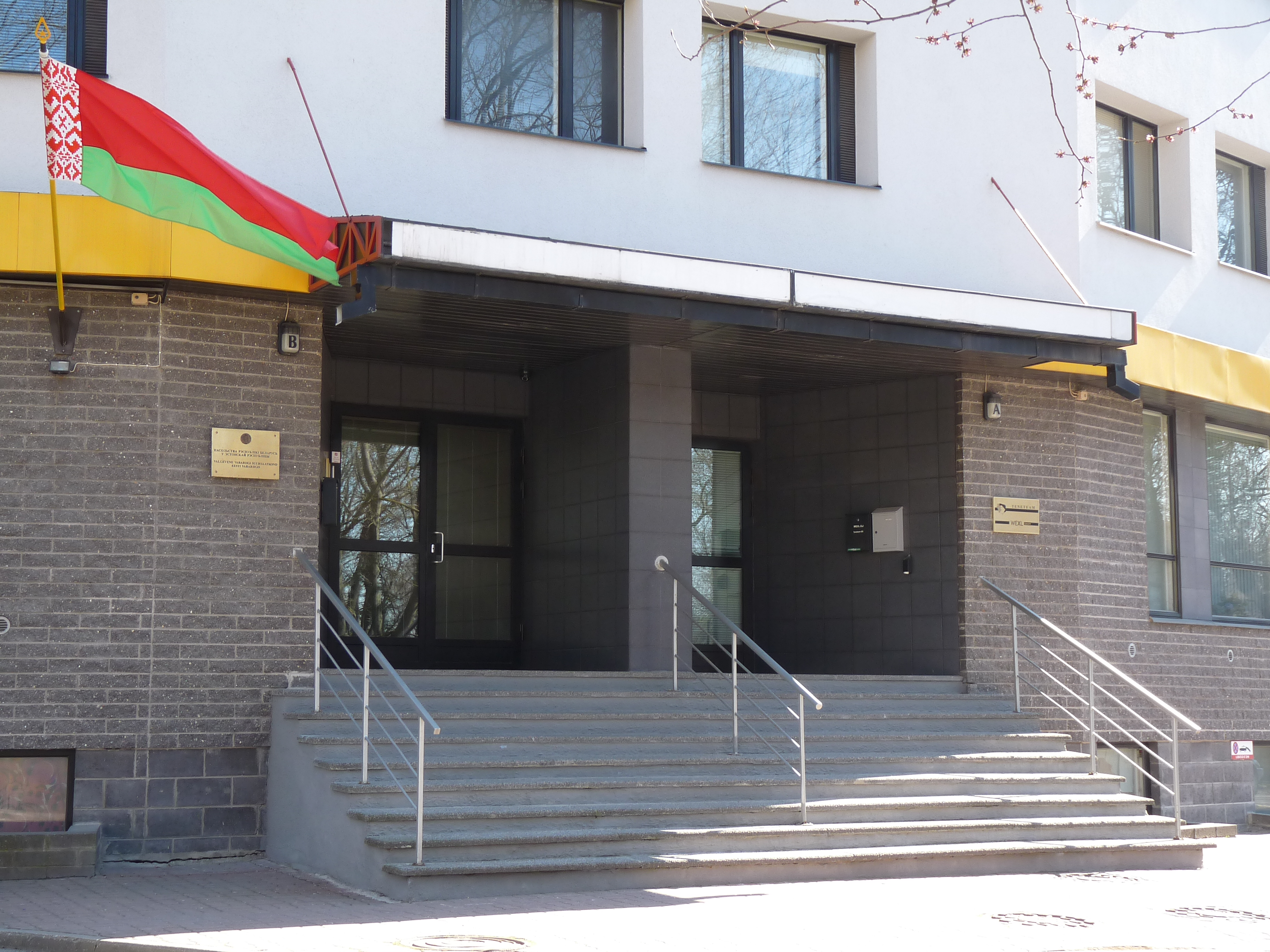
The Belarusian embassy in Tallinn.

Belarus–Estonia relations are the bilateral relations between Belarus and Estonia. Before 1991, both countries were part of the USSR, and before then part of the Russian Empire. Diplomatic relations between both countries were established on April 6, 1992. Belarus has a Consulate General in Tallinn. Estonia opened its Consulate General in Minsk on July 21, 1995.

== History ==
=== Post-1991 ===
The Republic of Estonia recognized Belarus's independence on April 20, 1992. The two countries had different views on their further development after the dissolution of the Soviet Union. Estonia sought to join NATO, the European Union, and strengthen ties with the Baltic countries. Due to this, Belarus was perceived as a "fragment of the Soviet Union" in Estonia.

The Belarusian government opened its consulate-general in Tallinn in March 1994. In turn, Estonia did the same a year later in July 1995. As relations gradually improved, Estonia decided to open its embassy in Minsk in October 2009. Belarus reciprocated by opening its embassy in Tallinn in June 2010.

On November 30, 1994, an agreement on the regulation of relations between the foreign ministries of Belarus and Estonia was signed. In July 2009, members of the Riigikogu (Estonian Parliament) visited Belarus. In September 2010, a delegation from the National Assembly of Belarus also visited Estonia.

=== Development ===
Estonian officials have often criticized Belarus multiple times for human rights violations and reluctance to adhere to democratic standards. After the presidential elections in 2010, relations between the two countries deteriorated. Estonia did not recognize the Belarusian presidential elections as democratic. In early 2011, the Estonian leadership supported the proposal to impose image-based sanctions against Belarusian authorities.

During the 22nd OSCE Ministerial Council Meeting, a working meeting between the foreign ministers of Belarus and Estonia took place.

In early October 2017, a Belarusian delegation visited Estonia, led by First Deputy Prime Minister of Belarus Vasily Matyushevsky. During the visit, a meeting with Estonian Prime Minister Jüri Ratas was organized.

=== Deterioration in relations ===
After the sixth presidential elections in Belarus, relations between the two countries began to worsen. Estonia became the first country to impose sanctions against Belarusian officials. The Estonian Ministry of Foreign Affairs did not recognize the legitimacy of Alexander Lukashenko. On October 8, 2020, the Ambassador of Estonia to Belarus, Merike Kokajev, presented her credentials to Alexander Lukashenko.

As of summer of 2021, Estonia appointed a new ambassador to Belarus, but the Estonian authorities decided that Jaak Lensment would not go to Belarus as the ambassador. However, the appointment was later canceled.

On August 12, 2022, Estonian Minister of Foreign Affairs Urmas Reinsalu announced that Estonian authorities decided not to send their ambassador to Belarus after the end of the term of the current head of the diplomatic mission. He explained that "sending an ambassador would mean presenting credentials to Lukashenko, who is not recognized by the Republic of Estonia as the legitimate president, so the level of our diplomatic relations remains at the level of a Chargé d'affaires".

=== Relations with the Belarusian opposition ===
On October 24, 2022, Sviatlana Tsikhanouskaya, the recognized winner of the 2020 Belarusian presidential election by EU countries, visited Tallinn, Estonia, upon the invitation of Estonian Minister of Foreign Affairs, Urmas Reinsalu. During her visit, Tsikhanouskaya held important meetings with Estonian leaders, including President Alar Karis and Parliament Speaker Jüri Ratas, as well as university rectors. She addressed deputies with a speech highlighting the struggle of Belarusians for freedom and against Russian revanchism.

During the meeting with Urmas Reinsalu, she mentioned Belarusian figure Anton Luckievich and his connection with Estonia, stating that Estonia has been a reliable friend of democracy in Belarus. As a gesture of support and friendship, Reinsalu ceremoniously presented her with a copy of the found archives of the Act of Recognition of Estonian Independence by the Belarusian People's Republic.

In response to the situation in Belarus, the Estonian Ministry of Foreign Affairs announced that Estonia will appoint a diplomatic representative to Vilnius, Lithuania, who will work with democratic forces in Belarus. Estonian President Alar Karis reaffirmed the country's support for Belarusian democratic forces and stressed the need to hold Alexander Lukashenko, the incumbent leader of Belarus, accountable for his actions.

Overall, the visit of Sviatlana Tsikhanouskaya to Tallinn highlighted Estonia's commitment to supporting democracy in Belarus and strengthening bilateral ties between the two nations.

== Resident diplomatic missions ==
- Belarus has an embassy in Tallinn.
- Estonia has an embassy in Minsk.

== See also ==
- Foreign relations of Belarus
- Foreign relations of Estonia
