= Belarus–Denmark relations =

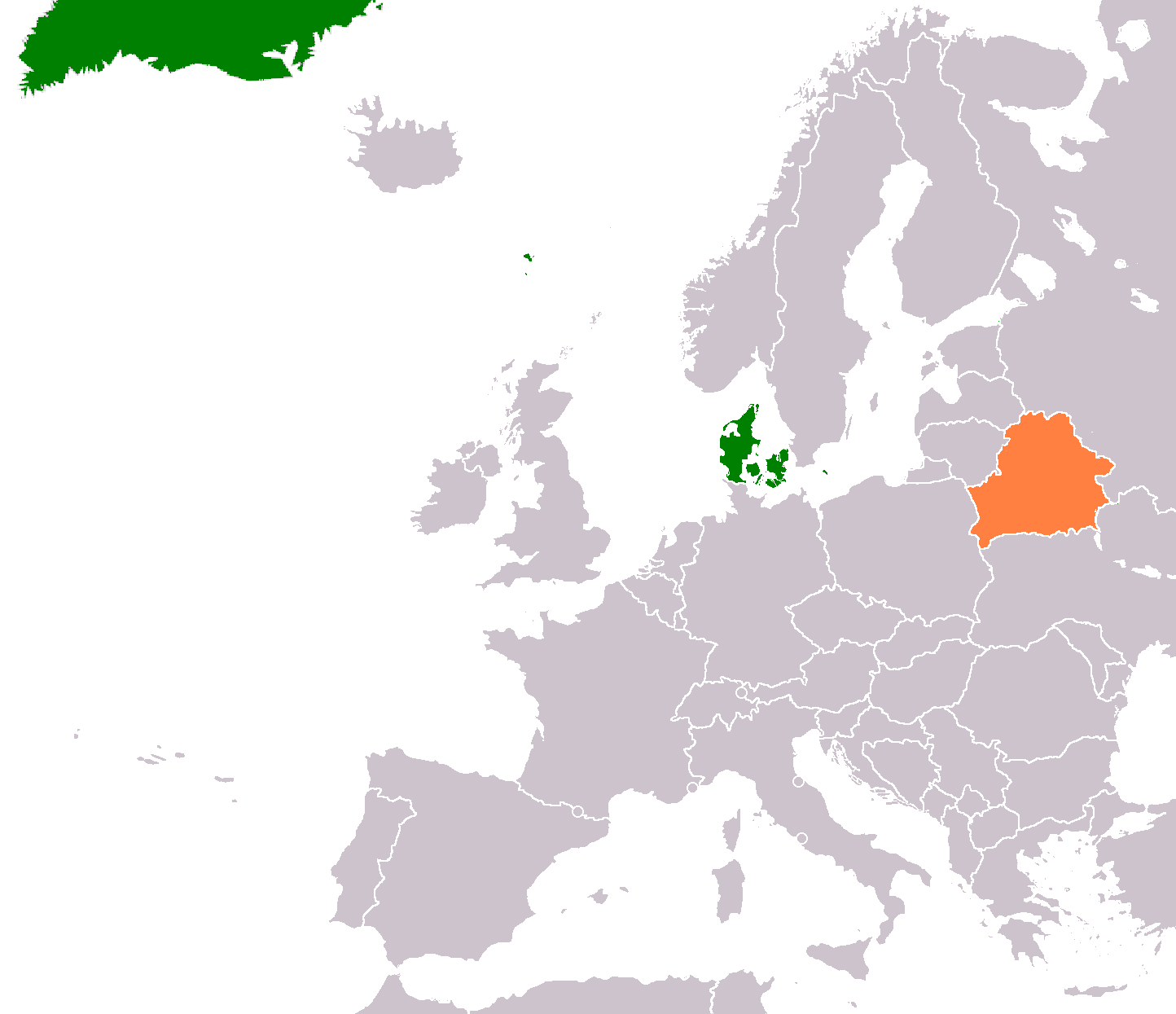

- Denmark: Belarus

Belarus is diplomatically represented in Denmark through its embassy in Stockholm, Sweden. Denmark is represented through its embassy in Moscow, Russia. Denmark, together with Norway recognized and established relations with Belarus on January 14, 1992. Both countries are members of the Organization for Security and Co-operation in Europe and Denmark is a full member of Council of Europe while Belarus is an official candidate.

== Assistance ==
From 1990 to 2003, Denmark assisted Belarus with 108 million DKK. Denmark assists Belarus with democratic development, civil society, and free media, and to prevent human trafficking. On 28 January 2009, a meeting with Belarusian and Danish NGO was held, interesting in expanding cooperation between Belarus Denmark.

== Trade ==
In 2008, the trade between Belarus and Denmark was $116 million. Belarusian exports amounted $19 million. Danish exports amounted $96 million. In 2009, the trade amounted $118 million. Denmark has invested in 21 Belarusian enterprises. On 29 January 2009, a delegation from both countries, discussed trade and economic relations between the two countries.

== See also ==
- Foreign relations of Belarus
- Foreign relations of Denmark
