= 2016 in Belarus =

- Decades: 1990s; 2000s; 2010s; 2020s
- See also: History of Belarus; List of years in Belarus

Events from the year 2016 in Belarus

== Incumbents ==
- President: Alexander Lukashenko
- Prime Minister: Andrei Kobyakov

== Events ==
- 15 January – the geostationary telecommunications satellite Belintersat-1 was launched for the Belarusian government's company Belintersat.
- 5-21 August – Belarus at the 2016 Summer Olympics: 124 competitors in 18 sports.
- 11 September – 2016 Belarusian parliamentary election

== Deaths ==
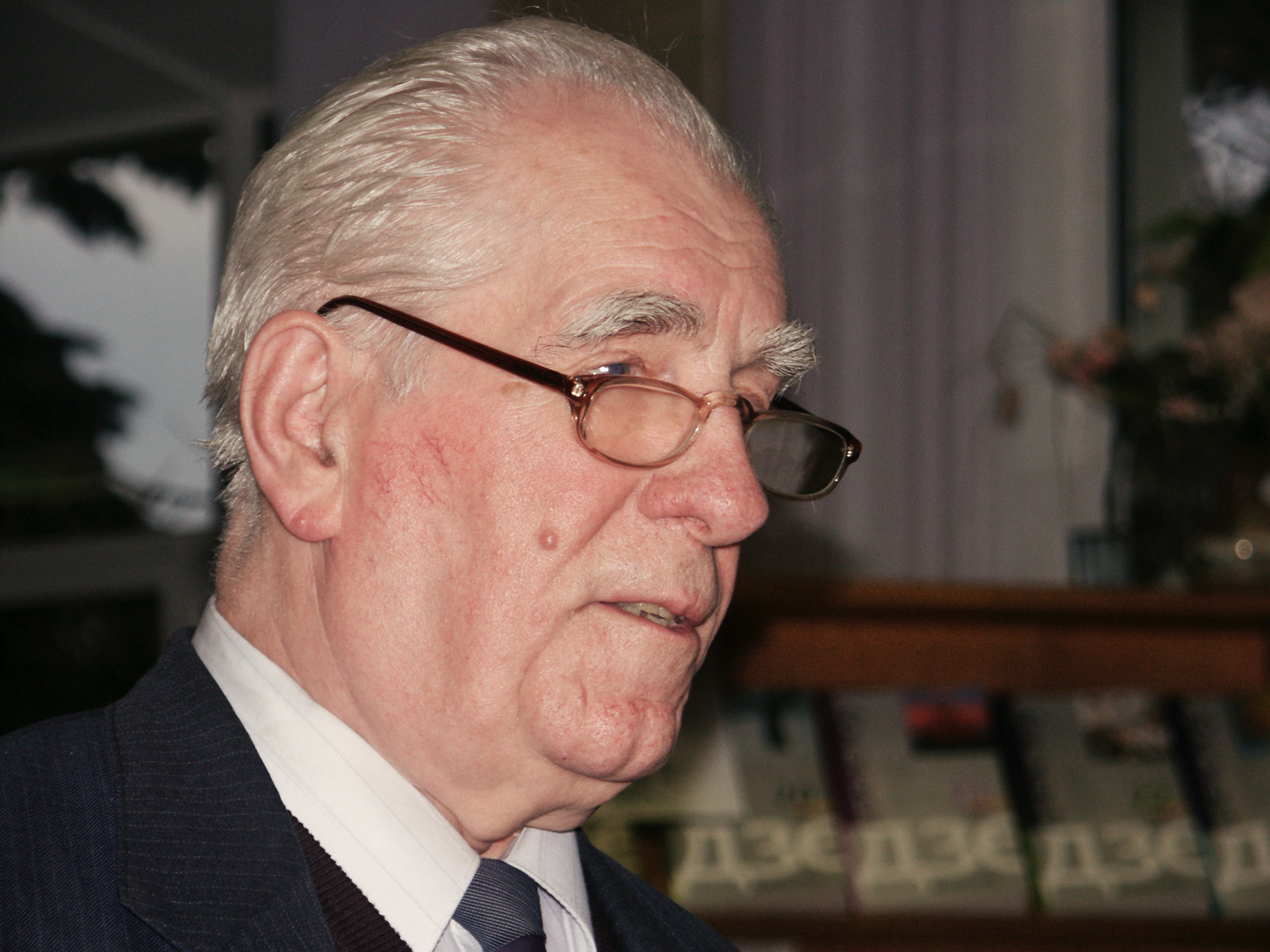
Nil Hilevich

- 29 March – Nil Hilevich, poet (b. 1931).
- 9 June – Stepan Bondarev, Belarusian Soviet Army lieutenant general (b. 1923)
- 26 June – Sergei Cortez, composer (b. 1935).
- 26 June – Rostislav Yankovsky, actor (b. 1930)
- 16 July – Oleg Syrokvashko, footballer (b. 1961)
- 20 July – Pavel Sheremet, Belarusian-born Russian journalist (b. 1971)
- October – Svetlana Penkina, actress (b. 1951)
- 17 December – Leanid Marakou, journalist and historian (b. 1958)
