= 2018 in Belarus =

- Decades: 1990s; 2000s; 2010s; 2020s
- See also: History of Belarus; List of years in Belarus

Events in the year 2018 in Belarus.

== Incumbents ==
- President: Alexander Lukashenko
- Prime Ministers: Andrei Kobyakov, Syarhey Rumas

== Events ==
=== February ===
- February 9-25 Belarus took part in the 2018 Winter Olympics in PyeongChang, South Korea.

=== March ===
- March 9-18: Belarus takes part in the 2018 Winter Paralympics in PyeongChang, South Korea.

== Deaths ==
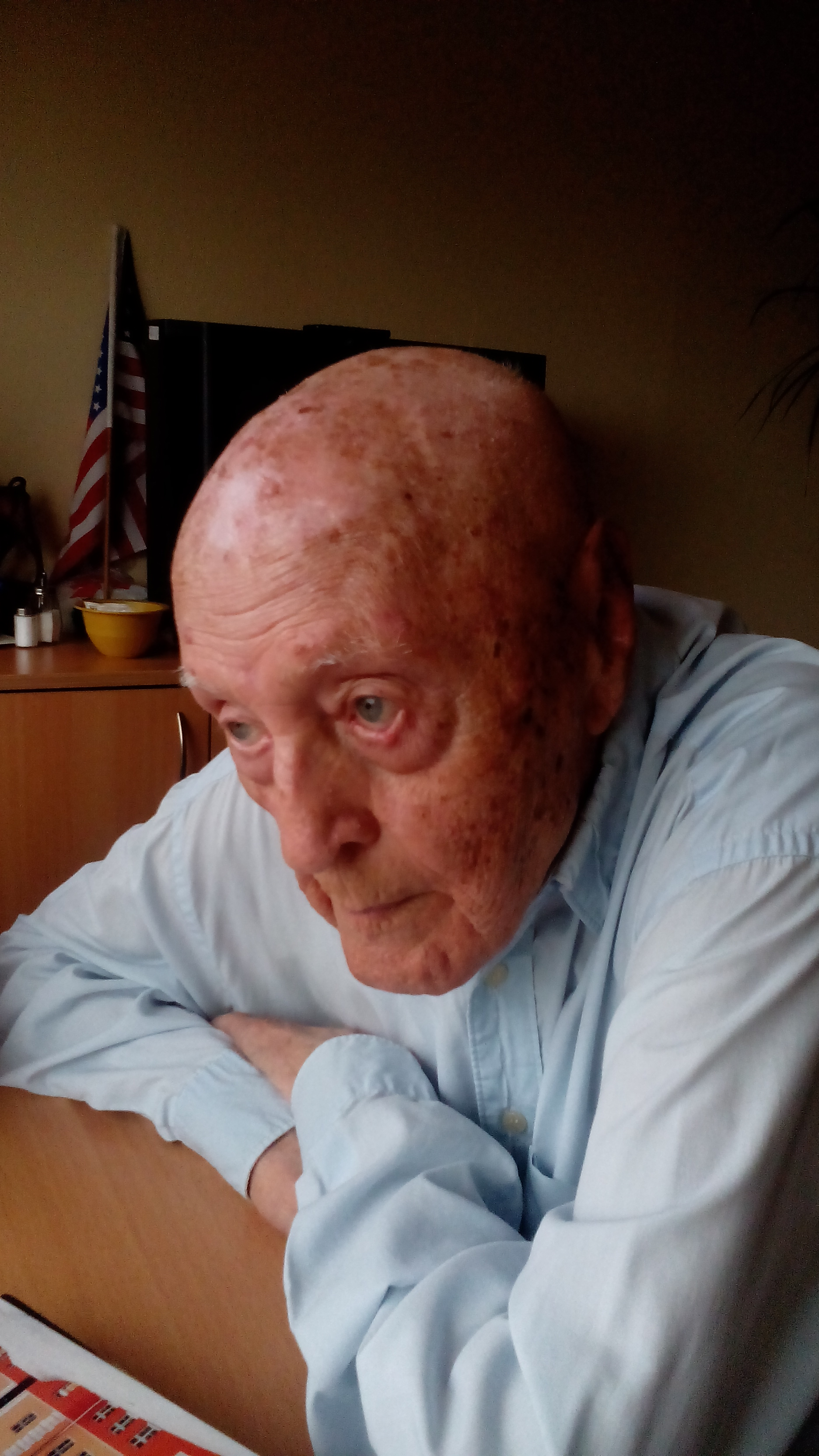
Barys Kit in 2015, then 105 years old

- 1 February – Barys Kit, rocket scientist (b. 1910).
- 6 April – Aleksandr Kurlovich, weightlifter (b. 1961)
- 10 July – Nikolai Dementey, politician (b. 1930).
