= 2014 in Belarus =

- Decades: 1990s; 2000s; 2010s; 2020s
- See also: History of Belarus; List of years in Belarus

The following lists events that happened during 2014 in the Republic of Belarus.

== Incumbents ==
- President: Alexander Lukashenko
- Prime Minister: Mikhail Myasnikovich (until 27 December), Andrei Kobyakov (starting 27 December)

== Events ==
=== May ===
- May 29 - The heads of Russia, Kazakhstan, and Belarus sign a treaty forming the Eurasian Economic Union.

=== August ===
- August 26 - The President of Russia Vladimir Putin meets with the President of Ukraine Petro Poroshenko in Minsk as disputes in eastern Ukraine continue.

=== November ===
- November 10 - Prosecutors in Lithuania charge an employee at the state air navigation company for spying for Belarus over civilian and military air operations.

=== December ===
- December 27 - Andrei Kobyakov replaces Mikhail Myasnikovich as Belarus's new prime minister in the biggest government reshuffle since 2010.
