= 2017 in Belarus =

- Decades: 1990s; 2000s; 2010s; 2020s
- See also: History of Belarus; List of years in Belarus

The following lists events in the year 2017 in Belarus.

== Incumbents ==
- President: Alexander Lukashenko
- Prime Minister: Andrei Kobyakov

== Events ==
=== February ===
- 19 February - 2000 people spread the march of the 2017 Belarusian protests from the capital of Minsk to other cities in Belarus against a 2015 tax law.

=== March ===
- 25 March - Despite bans on protests, hundreds protest in Minsk against a so-called "social parasites" tax on the unemployed.

== Deaths ==
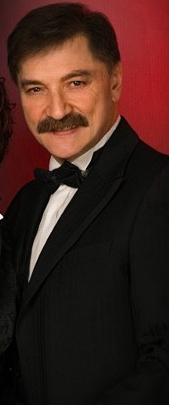
Alexander Tikhanovich

- 28 January – Alexander Tikhanovich, pop singer (b. 1952).
- 2 August – Alexander Gerasimenko, politician and diplomat (b. 1946)
