= 2020 in Belarus =

- Decades: 2000s; 2010s; 2020s
- See also: History of Belarus; List of years in Belarus

Events in the year 2020 in Belarus.

== Incumbents ==
- President: Alexander Lukashenko
- Prime Minister: Syarhey Rumas, Roman Golovchenko

== Events ==
Ongoing – 2020-2021 Belarusian protests; COVID-19 pandemic in Belarus

=== February ===
- 14 February
  - Belarus threatens to take oil from the Druzhba pipeline which carries Russian oil to central Europe across its territory, if Russia does not supply it with the required volumes of crude oil. Russian oil supplies to Belarus have not been agreed for 2020 and shipments have dwindled to 500,000 tonnes, down from a planned 2 million tonnes.
  - Belarusian president Alexander Lukashenko says Moscow hinted at an energy supply deal in exchange for Belarus merging with Russia, which caused talks to collapse.
- 28 February – The first case of COVID-19 in the country was registered in Minsk. The individual, a student from Iran who had tested positive on 27 February, had arrived to the country via a flight from Baku, Azerbaijan, on 22 February.

=== March ===
- 31 March – The first COVID-19 death in the country is reported by the media: a 75-year-old patient in Vitebsk who had suffered from a chronic pulmonary disease. Later that day, the death is confirmed by the Ministry of Health.

=== April ===
- 9 April – A mandatory 14-day self-isolation requirement was issued for foreigners and citizens with either confirmed COVID-19 diagnosis, or the status of first or second level contact. The penalties for breaking the requirement include administrative detention, fines and imprisonment.
- 20 April – Schools in the country reopen, but authorities say that parents are allowed to keep their children at home despite lifting of restrictions.

=== May ===
- 9 May – The country received 100,000 rapid diagnostic COVID-19 test kits from China to help combat the pandemic in the country, with another batch expected to be delivered in the coming week.

=== June ===
- 19 June – President Alexander Lukashenko announces that he has foiled a coup attempt, resulting in the arrest of main opposition rival Viktar Babaryka. He later states that Babaryka may be arrested for possible financial crimes.
- 20 June – Internet access is interrupted and hundreds are detained after mass protests break out in Belarus over the arrest of opposition candidate Babaryka, including reporters from Radio Free Europe/Radio Liberty.

=== July ===
- 14 July – The Belarusian election commission bars two prominent opposition candidates to current president Alexander Lukashenko from running in the election, ensuring a victory for Lukashenko. The barred candidates are Viktar Babaryka who was disqualified for an open criminal case against him and Valery Tsepkalo whose signatures on a supporting petition were nullified.
- 24 July – Prominent opposition leader Valery Tsepkalo and his two sons flee to Russia after being barred from running in the election and alleged threats of prosecution by the prosecutor's office, which declined to comment on Tsepkalo's escape.
- 29 July – Belarusian security forces arrest 32 members of the private military company Wagner Group at a sanitarium near Minsk in an overnight raid. All those detained are Russian nationals, according to authorities. President Alexander Lukashenko convenes an emergency meeting with his security council, and instructs the chairman of the State Security Committee to ask Russia for an official explanation.

=== August ===
- 6 August – Belarusian president Alexander Lukashenko says security forces have arrested "a number of" U.S. citizens, just days before the country goes to the polls for a presidential election. In the speech, Lukashenko claims Belarus is the victim of a "hybrid war", and that "we should expect dirty tricks from any side".
- 8 August – On the eve of a presidential election, Belarusian security forces arrest Maria Moroz, the campaign manager of leading opposition candidate Sviatlana Tsikhanouskaya, and three Open Russia activists who traveled to Belarus to "observe Sunday's presidential election".
- 9 August
  - Citizens of Belarus vote to elect the country's president. Long-ruling Alexander Lukashenko is challenged by Sviatlana Tsikhanouskaya after her husband and pro-democracy activist Siarhei Tsikhanouski was jailed and banned from the vote like other prominent opposition figures. Protesters and journalists were also detained in the weeks leading to the election.
  - A state television exit poll shows President Alexander Lukashenko winning 79.7% of the vote. These results have been dismissed by the main opposition candidate Sviatlana Tsikhanouskaya, who criticized them has "massively rigged".
  - Lukashenko, in power since 1994, declares a landslide victory against the opposition, as riot police clash with protesters in the capital Minsk. Protests in reaction to the disputed results have been reported in at least 20 other Belarusian cities. Fifty civilians and thirty-nine police officers were injured, while at least 3,000 protesters are arrested across the country, one-third of them in Minsk.
  - A police van in Minsk rams a group of protesters, hitting one of them. The condition of the victim is unknown, with reports of his death not confirmed.
  - NetBlocks reports that the internet has been "significantly disrupted" in Belarus, with a near total blackout in Minsk.
- 10 August
  - During the second day of protests across Belarus, police fire rubber bullets to disperse protesters in the capital Minsk, wounding a journalist. About 30 people are arrested in the city; some protestors were beaten by police.
  - A protester in Minsk is killed after an explosive device blows up in his hands while he tried to throw it. It is the first death during the protests.
- 11 August – Belarusian opposition leader Sviatlana Tsikhanouskaya flees Belarus to her family in Lithuania, according to Lithuanian Foreign Minister Linas Antanas Linkevičius. Tsikhanouskaya had gone into hiding after the disputed election, which she accuses President Alexander Lukashenko of rigging.
- 12 August – Lithuania allows "unrestricted entry" to all Belarusians "for humanitarian purposes" amid anti-government protests and political repression in neighbouring Belarus. Existing COVID-19 restrictions will not apply to Belarusians.
- 13 August
  - A 25-year-old man from the city of Gomel becomes the second protester killed since protests in Belarus against the government began. He died while in police custody, according to his family.
  - The UN High Commissioner for Human Rights Michelle Bachelet condemns the use of violence by Belarusian authorities against protesters, and calls for the release of all political prisoners in the country.
  - Belarusian women form human chains to condemn a crackdown on protests over the disputed election.
  - Factory workers from state-run factories joined the protest. Tens of thousands of people protested for the fifth day in a row against the election results. The protesters marched through Minsk and formed human chains.
- 14 August
  - Lithuania becomes the first EU state to openly reject the legitimacy of Alexander Lukashenko as President of Belarus. Lithuanian president Gitanas Nausėda says "We can not call Mister Lukashenko legitimate because there were no free democratic elections in Belarus".
  - Amnesty International says "widespread torture" is taking place inside detention centres in Belarus, with more than 6,700 people detained since protests against Lukashenko broke out following the disputed presidential election result. Amnesty International says detainees described being stripped naked, beaten and threatened with rape. The BBC also reports evidence of torture, including at the Okrestina detention centre in Minsk.
- 15 August
  - The leaders of the Baltic states, Estonia, Latvia and Lithuania, issue a joint statement calling on Belarus to hold a new "free and fair" election with international observers.
  - President Alexander Lukashenko issues an appeal to Russian president Vladimir Putin as he considers the protests "not a threat to just Belarus anymore". Statements by both sides contained a pointed reference to the Union State between the two countries. Meanwhile, opposition candidate leader Sviatlana Tsikhanouskaya, who is exiled in Lithuania, calls for more protests.
- 16 August
  - Russia says it is "ready to assist Belarus in accordance with a collective military pact if necessary" as opposition leader in-exile Sviatlana Tsikhanouskaya calls for a massive march.
  - Tens of thousands protest in the Belarusian capital Minsk calling for President Alexander Lukashenko to step down. It is believed to be the largest protest in Belarusian history.
  - In a defiant speech, Alexander Lukashenko addresses supporters in Independence Square, Minsk, where he claims Belarus would "die as a state" if new elections were held, and accuses NATO of "massing on the border". Opposition critics say most of those at the rally were coerced into attending and had been bussed in from other parts of the country.
  - The Belarusian ambassador to Slovakia, Igor Leshchenya, defects to the opposition after posting a video declaring his support for the protests.
- 17 August
  - British Foreign Secretary Dominic Raab issues a statement that the United Kingdom does not recognize the results of the Belarusian presidential election, which saw President Alexander Lukashenko re-elected. Raab calls the election "fraudulent" and demands an independent investigation into the results.
  - Ukraine recalls its Ambassador to Belarus to assess "the new reality" and prospects of further bilateral relations between the two neighbouring countries.
  - President Alexander Lukashenko says he is "ready to share power in Belarus, although not under pressure from the streets". Meanwhile, opposition leader in-exile Sviatlana Tsikhanouskaya urges security forces to defect to her side and says she is prepared to lead the country.
  - Addressing workers at a truck factory, Lukashenko states that there will be no fresh elections "until you kill me". He urges the protestors to let people who want to work to work amid a general strike. He is booed and jeered by the crowd.
  - The Belarusian state media National State Television and Radio Company of Belarus headquarters in Minsk is reportedly emptied after staff members walked out and joined the general strike. State television is still on air but only showing an empty studio with music playing in the background.
- 18 August – Lithuanian MPs approve economic sanctions against Belarus over the contested presidential elections. Lithuanian foreign minister Linas Linkevičius says Lithuania is "sending a strong message to the world" and refuses to recognize Alexander Lukashenko as President.
- 19 August
  - The European Union formally rejects the result of the latest presidential election in Belarus, which saw Alexander Lukashenko re-elected with over 80% of the vote. The European Commission announces it will reroute €53 million away from the Belarusian government to civil society.
  - President Alexander Lukashenko says he has ordered security forces to "end the unrest" in Minsk, saying "People are tired. People demand peace and quiet", while also warning that state workers who joined a general strike will not be given their jobs back, and will instead be "replaced by Russians".
- 23 August
  - Tens of thousands rally in Independence Square, Minsk, calling for President Alexander Lukashenko to step down, despite a police ban on protests in the capital.
  - The Ministry of Defence describes anti-Lukashenko protesters as "fascists", and says the army will take over the protection of war memorials from local police forces.
  - Footage shows Alexander Lukashenko departing a military helicopter outside the Independence Palace in Minsk, brandishing an assault rifle and wearing a bullet-proof vest. He then greeted a cordon of security forces guarding the palace. He was accompanied by his son Nikolai Lukashenko. In another video, Lukashenko can be heard saying "They’ve run away like rats", while observing a protest in his helicopter.
- 24 August – The Coordinating Council of the Belarusian opposition report that two of its members, Sergei Dylevsky and Olga Kovalkova, have been detained by police in Minsk.
- 27 August – Police in Belarus arrest 20 journalists who were planning to cover a protest in Minsk and confiscated their telephones and identity documents. The interior ministry later said that the journalists had been driven to the police station to check they had valid accreditation allowing them to work as journalists.

=== September ===
- 23 September – Spontaneous protests broke out in Minsk after an unannounced inauguration ceremony of President Alexander Lukashenko took place. Authorities fired tear gas, deployed water cannons and arrested more than 150 protesters from the gathering.

== Deaths ==
- 23 March – Pyotr Lysenko, archaeologist (b. 1931).
- 31 March – Viktar Dashkevich, stage actor (b. 1945).
- 17 May – Yuri Zisser, web services executive, founder and owner of Tut.By (b. 1960).
- 2 June – Henadz Mardas, footballer (b. 1970).
- 10 August – Alexander Taraikovsky, protester (b. 1986).

== See also ==
- List of years in Belarus
- 2020 in Belarus
- 2020 in Belarusian sport
- 2020–2021 Belarusian protests
- Timeline of the 2020–2021 Belarusian protests
