= 2013 in Belarus =

- Decades: 1990s; 2000s; 2010s; 2020s
- See also: History of Belarus; List of years in Belarus

Events in the year 2013 in Belarus.

== Incumbents ==
- President: Alexander Lukashenko
- Prime Minister: Mikhail Myasnikovich

== Deaths ==
- 5 December – Iryna Charnushenka-Stasiuk, Olympic long jumper (b. 1979).

== See also ==
- List of years in Belarus
- 2013 in Belarus
