= 2015 in Belarus =

- Decades: 1990s; 2000s; 2010s; 2020s
- See also: History of Belarus; List of years in Belarus

The following lists events that happened during 2015 in the Republic of Belarus.

== Incumbents ==
- President: Alexander Lukashenko
- Prime Minister: Andrei Kobyakov

== Events ==
=== January ===
- January 1 - The Eurasian Economic Union came into effect, creating a political and economic union between Russia, Belarus, Armenia and Kazakhstan.

=== October ===
- October 11 - The next presidential election will take place.
