= 2019 in Belarus =

- Decades: 1990s; 2000s; 2010s; 2020s
- See also: History of Belarus; List of years in Belarus

Events in the year 2019 in Belarus.

== Incumbents ==
- President: Alexander Lukashenko
- Prime Ministers: Syarhey Rumas

== Events ==
=== Sports ===
- January 21–27: The 2019 European Figure Skating Championships were held in Minsk.
- Juni 21–30: 2019 European Games are hosted by the city of Minsk.

== Deaths ==
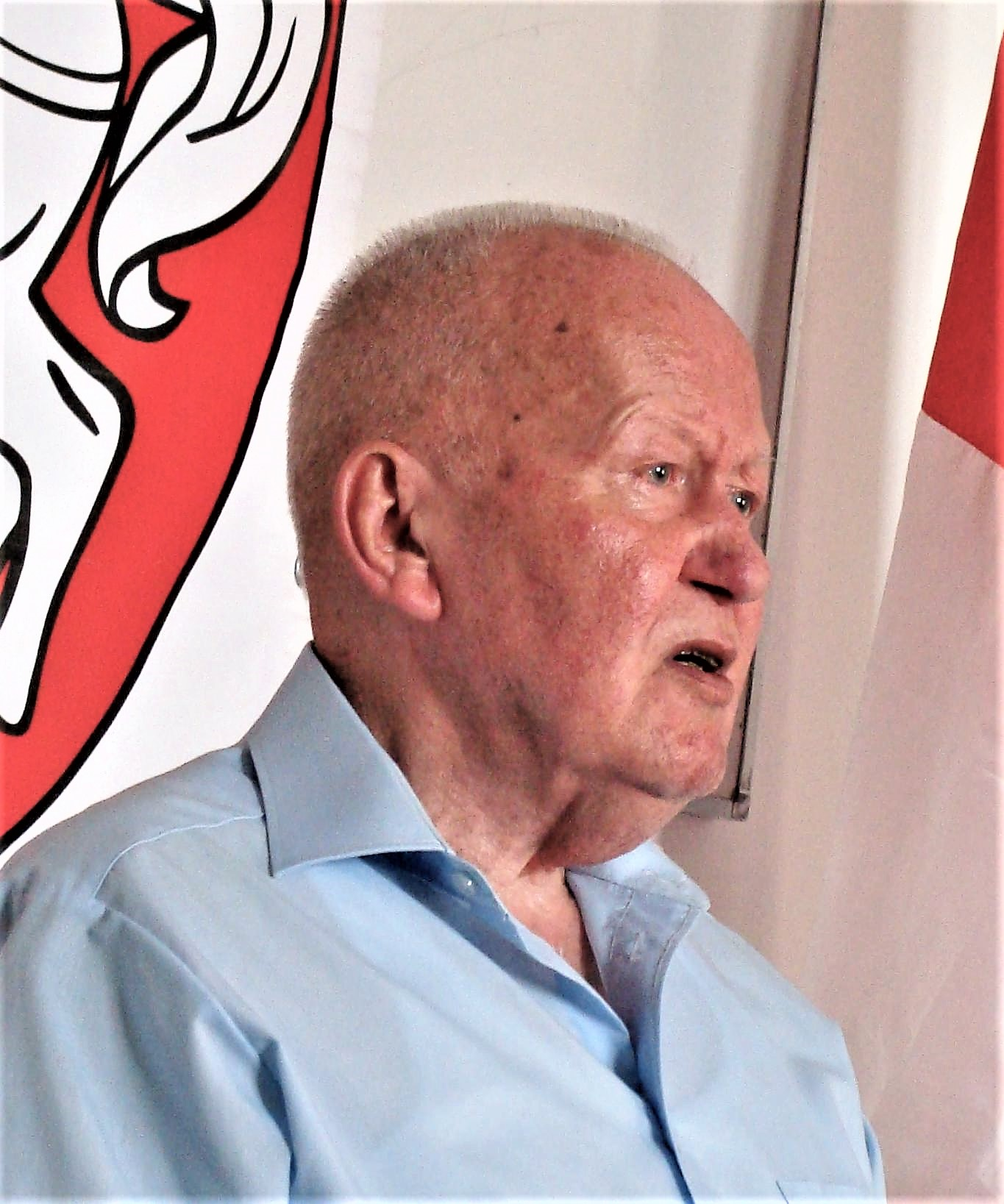
Jerzy Turonek

- 2 January – Jerzy Turonek, Polish-Belarusian historian (b. 1929).
- 4 February – Leu Mazurkevich, football player and manager (b. 1939).
- 9 February – Siamion Domash, politician (b. 1950).
- 19 April – Renald Knysh, artistic gymnastics coach (b. 1931).
