= 2007 in Belarus =

- Decades: 1980s; 1990s; 2000s; 2010s; 2020s
- See also: History of Belarus; List of years in Belarus

Events from the year 2007 in Belarus

== Incumbents ==
- President: Alexander Lukashenko
- Prime Minister: Sergei Sidorsky

== Events ==
=== January ===
- January 8: Russian oil supplies to Poland, Germany, and Ukraine are cut as the Russia-Belarus energy dispute escalates.
- January 13: The energy dispute between Russia and Belarus is resolved after about 10 hours of negotiations between Russian Prime Minister Mikhail Fradkov and his Belarusian counterpart, Sergey Sidorsky.

=== March ===
- March 25: Up to 10,000 people protest in Minsk against President of Belarus Alexander Lukashenko.

=== April ===
- April 25: U.S. Deputy Assistant Secretary of State for European and Eurasian Affairs David Kramer, speaking on behalf of the U.S. government, offers to normalize relations with Belarus if it releases imprisoned politicians.

=== August ===
- August 1: Russia's gas exports monopoly Gazprom will almost halve supplies to Belarus from August 3 after failing to reach a deal with Minsk over a $456 million energy debt.

== Deaths ==
- February 23: Hanna Barysevich, 118?, claimed to be world's oldest person.

== See also ==
- Years in Belarus
