= 2021 in Belarus =

- Decades: 2000s; 2010s; 2020s
- See also: History of Belarus; List of years in Belarus

Events in the year 2021 in Belarus.

== Incumbents ==
- President: Alexander Lukashenko
- Prime Minister: Roman Golovchenko

== Events ==
Ongoing — COVID-19 pandemic in Belarus, 2020–2021 Belarusian protests (Timeline of the 2020–2021 Belarusian protests)

- 11 March – Belarus reports their first case of the Lineage B.1.1.7 of SARS-CoV-2, which originated in the United Kingdom.
- 23 May – Ryanair Flight 4978 incident: Flight 4978, a Boeing 737 aircraft operated by Ryanair, was an international passenger flight from Athens to Vilnius that was diverted to Minsk National Airport by the Belarusian Air Force, citing a bomb threat, which was later deemed false. The flight was carrying Belarusian opposition journalist Roman Protasevich, who was subsequently arrested upon landing in Minsk. The incident sparked international outrage, with many condemning Belarus for its actions, which were seen as a violation of international aviation rules and human rights. Belarus faced severe diplomatic repercussions, including sanctions imposed by the European Union and other countries.

=== Scheduled events ===
- 11 to 12 February – Allbelarusian People's Assembly
- 21 May to 6 June – Scheduled date for the 2021 IIHF World Championship, not to be co-hosted any more by Minsk, Belarus and Riga, Latvia.
- 7 to 13 June – Scheduled date for the 2021 World Modern Pentathlon Championships, to be moved from Minsk.

== Deaths ==
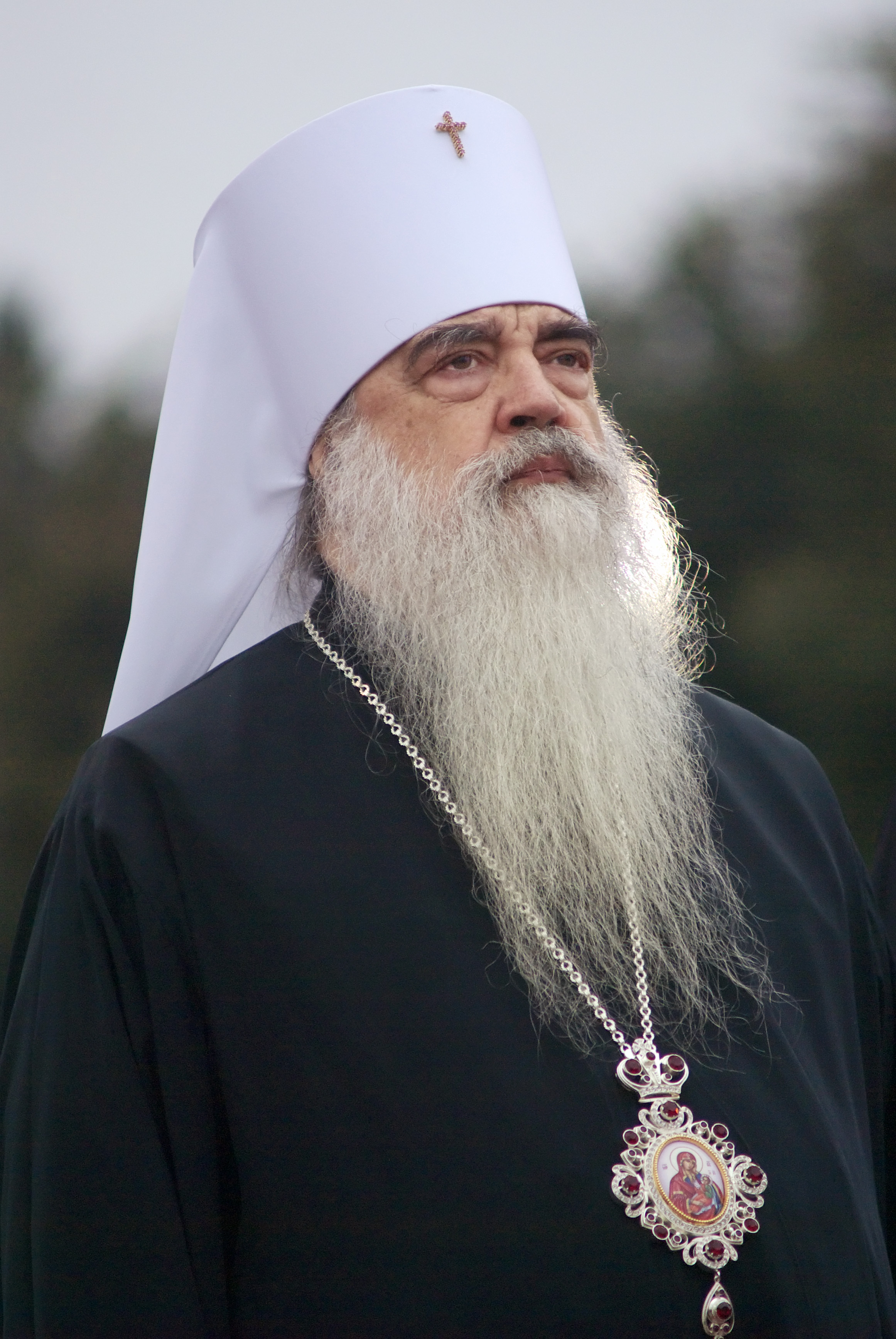
Philaret

- 12 January – Philaret, Orthodox prelate (born 1935).
- June – Raïssa Koublitskaïa, agricultural worker and politician (b. 1928).
