= 2008 in Belarus =

- Decades: 1980s; 1990s; 2000s; 2010s; 2020s
- See also: History of Belarus; List of years in Belarus

The following lists events that happened during 2008 in Belarus.

== Incumbents ==
- President: Alexander Lukashenko
- Prime Minister: Sergei Sidorsky

== Events ==
=== January ===
- January 18 - An editor of an independent newspaper who reproduced the controversial cartoons of Muhammad was jailed for three years.
