= 1993 in Belarus =

- Decades: 1970s; 1980s; 1990s; 2000s; 2010s
- See also: History of Belarus; List of years in Belarus

Events from the year 1993 in Belarus

== Incumbents ==
- President: not yet established
- Chairman of the Supreme Soviet of the Republic of Belarus: Stanislav Shushkevich

== Events ==
- December 30: The new Beer Lovers Party, formed in August, is officially registered, with Andrey Romashevsky as its chairman.

== Births ==
- March 5: Anna Orlik, tennis player

== Deaths ==
- September 28: Galina Makarova, actress (born 1919)

== See also ==
- Years in Belarus
