= Oleg Syrokvashko =

Belarusian footballer (1961–2016)

Personal information
- Date of birth: 3 August 1961
- Place of birth: Minsk, Belarusian SSR
- Date of death: 16 July 2016 (aged 54)
- Place of death: Brest, Belarus
- Height: 1.78 m (5 ft 10 in)
- Position: Goalkeeper

Youth career
- Torpedo Minsk

Senior career*
Years	Team	Apps	(Gls)
1981–1986	Dinamo Brest	129	(0)
1987–1988	Dinamo Minsk	0	(0)
1988–1989	Dinamo Brest	32	(0)
1990–1991	Avangard Rovno	54	(0)
1992	Victoria Jaworzno		
1992	Torpedo Minsk	4	(0)
1993	Navbahor Namangan	22	(0)
1994–1995	Brestbytkhim Brest	14	(0)
1996	Kobrin	14	(0)
1997	Dinamo Brest	18	(0)

Managerial career
- 1999: Pruzhany
- 2001–2003: Dinamo Brest (assistant)
- 2003: Dinamo Brest
- 2004: Dinamo Brest (assistant)
- 2007–2008: Smorgon (assistant)
- 2009–2011: Belarus U21/Belarus Olympic (goalkeeper coach)
- 2009–2016: Dinamo Brest (goalkeeper coach)
- * Club domestic league appearances and goals

Oleg Syrokvashko (Belarusian: Алег Сыраквашка; Russian: Олег Сыроквашко; 3 August 1961 – 16 July 2016) was a Belarusian professional football coach and player. He spent the majority of his playing and coaching career at Dinamo Brest. He died at the age of 54 after a long-term illness.
