= Stepan Bondarev =

Soviet military leader

- Born: 9 April 1923; Lenino, Terekhovsky District, Gomel Region, Belorussian SSR, Soviet Union
- Died: 9 June 2016 (aged 93) Moscow, Russia
- Allegiance: Soviet Union
- Branch: Red Army / Soviet Army
- Service years: 1941–1984
- Rank: Lieutenant general
- Commands: 16th Guards Tank Division; 29th Army
- Conflicts: World War II; Operation Bagration
- Awards: Order of the October Revolution; Order of the Red Banner; Order of the Patriotic War, 1st class; Order of the Red Star; Order for Service to the Homeland in the Armed Forces of the USSR, 3rd class

Stepan Markovich Bondarev (Russian: Степан Маркович Бондарев; 9 April 1923 – 9 June 2016) was a Soviet Army lieutenant general. He fought in World War II as a tank company commander. Postwar, he was commander of the 29th Army and deputy commander of the North Caucasus Military District and the Northern Group of Forces.

== Early life ==
Bondarev was born on 9 April 1923 in the village of Lenino in Terekhovsky District (now Dobrush District). He graduated from school in the village. He then took nine-month training courses for fifth to seventh grade teachers at the Gomel Pedagogical Institute. Bondarev graduated in 1940 and was sent to Brest. He became a teacher in the village of Lyubischitsy.

== World War II ==
Bondarev fought in World War II from its early days, initially as a private. He was a sergeant and squad leader of the Borisov Tank School on the Western Front and the Southwestern Front. Bondarev graduated from the 3rd Saratov Tank School in 1943 and became a cadet platoon commander. He fought in Operation Bagration as a tank company commander in the 3rd Guards Tank Brigade of the 3rd Tank Corps. On 1 July he participated in the capture of Borisov and two days later the capture of Minsk.

== Postwar ==
He graduated from the Military Armored Forces Academy in 1954. Bondarev commanded a tank battalion, tank regiment, and the 16th Guards Tank Division. In 1970, he graduated from the Military Academy of the General Staff. On 13 May 1970, Bondarev became commander of the 29th Army at Ulan-Ude, a position he held until 12 June 1972. In 1973 he was appointed deputy commander of the North Caucasus Military District for combat training, and later held the same position in the Northern Group of Forces. He retired in 1984 with the rank of lieutenant general.

On 11 March 1985, Bondarev was awarded the Order of the Patriotic War 1st class. Bondarev became a member of the Presidium of the Council of Veterans of the Republic of Belarus. He lived in Moscow's Arbat District. He became a member of the Presidium of the Council of War Veterans, Labor, Armed Forces, and Law Enforcement of the Arbat District. Bondarev was an honorary veteran of Moscow. In 2008, Bondarev became one of the first people to receive the title "Honorary Resident of the Arbat District". On 25 February 2015, he was awarded the Jubilee Medal "70 Years of Victory in the Great Patriotic War 1941–1945". Bondarev died on 9 June 2016.
