= Syarhey Rumas =

9th Prime Minister of Belarus 2018-2020

Sergei Rumas
- Сергей Румас; Сяргей Румас
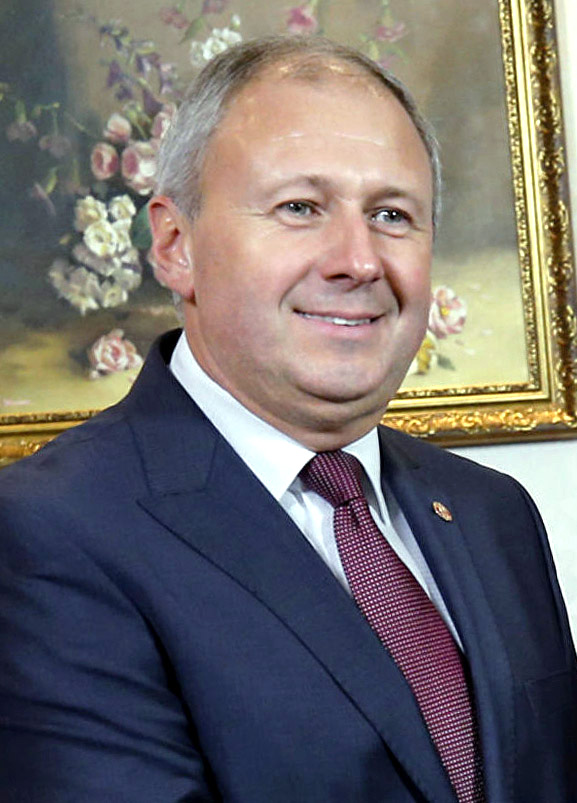
- Rumas in 2018

9th Prime Minister of Belarus
- In office 18 August 2018 – 3 June 2020
- President: Alexander Lukashenko
- Preceded by: Andrei Kobyakov
- Succeeded by: Roman Golovchenko

Personal details
- Born: Syarhey Mikalayevich Rumas; December 1, 1969 (age 56) Gomel, Belarusian SSR, Soviet Union
- Children: 4
- Education: Military Finance and Economics Institute; Academy of Public Administration
- Awards: Order of Friendship; Order of Kurmet

Sergei Nikolayevich Rumas (Note: Belarusian: Сяргей Мікалаевіч Румас, romanized: Siarhiej Mikałajevič Rumas, Russian: Сергей Николаевич Румас, romanized: Sergej Nikolajevič Rumas) (born 1 December 1969) is a Belarusian politician and economist who served as Prime Minister of Belarus from August 2018 to June 2020.

== Biography ==
Rumas was born in Gomel, but in early 1970s his family moved to Minsk. He graduated from the Higher Military Financial School in Yaroslavl (1990) and the Academy of Public Administration in Minsk (1995). In the early 1990s, Rumas successively served in the National Bank of the Republic of Belarus as a chief of several departments and in private banks. In 1995, he became a regional director of Belarusbank and later became the first deputy chairman of the board of this bank. In 2001, Rumas was awarded a Candidate of Sciences degree in economics, his thesis was entitled "Ways of optimization of resource structure of commercial bank". In 2005, he headed Belagroprombank, another big state-owned bank in Belarus.

In 2010, he was made a vice-premier in the new government led by his old acquaintance Mikhail Myasnikovich. During the financial crisis of 2011, Rumas supervised the creation of a program of structural reforms, which was criticized by the president Alexander Lukashenko and his adviser Sergey Tkachyov. Rumas advocated privatization, foreign investments, and abolition of preferential loans for state-owned companies In 2012, Alexander Lukashenko appointed him a head of Development Bank of the Republic of Belarus.

Rumas was appointed prime minister by Alexander Lukashenko on August 18, 2018. The decree had a clause on the subsequent approval of Rumas's appointment in the House of Representatives, but the Constitution prescribes an opposite procedure. According to Radio Free Europe/Radio Liberty, his predecessor Andrey Kobyakov was appointed in the same way.

Rumas also heads the Football Federation of Belarus and the Organising Committee of the 2019 European Games in Minsk.

On 3 June 2020, President Alexander Lukashenko dismissed the Rumas government.

On 16 August 2020, an Instagram account belonging to Rumas issued a message of support to anti-Lukashenko protesters and asked for those responsible for abuse against protesters to be held to account. Rumas's wife also published a photograph of herself and Rumas on the roof of a building overlooking the protests, together with a message of support.

In February 2023, Rumas was blacklisted by Ukraine.

== Personal life ==
He is married with four sons. He and his wife have known each other since childhood. He is fond of hunting, fishing, and football.

== Awards ==
- Order of Friendship (19 December 2014, Russia)
- Order of Kurmet (8 September 2015, Kazakhstan)

== Notes ==
Political offices
Preceded by Andrei Kobyakov	Prime Minister of Belarus; 2018–2020	Succeeded by Roman Golovchenko
