= Andrei Kobyakov =

Belarusian politician

- Андрэй Кабякоў; Андрей Кобяков
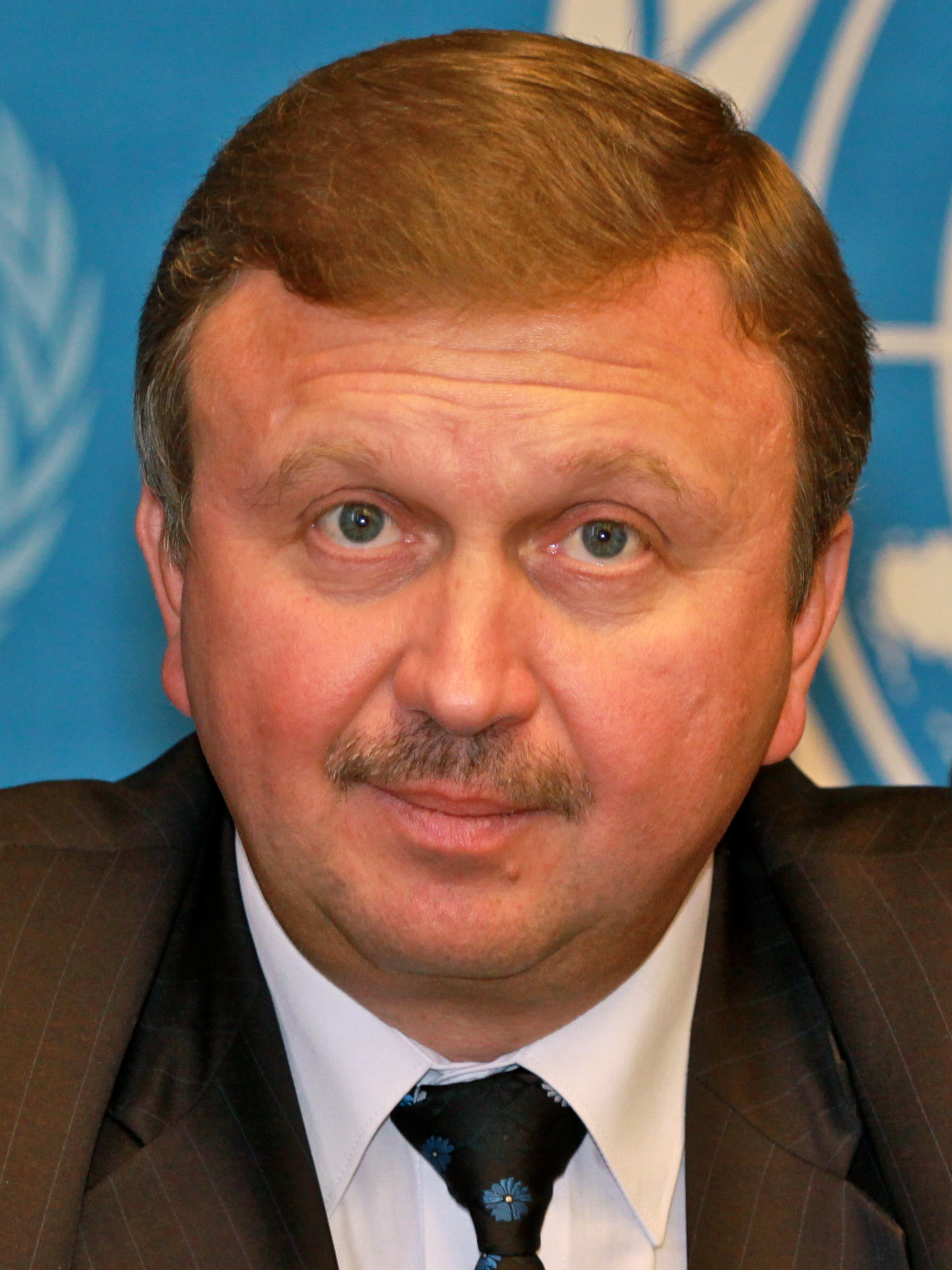
- Kobyakov in 2010

8th Prime Minister of Belarus
- In office 27 December 2014 – 18 August 2018
- President: Alexander Lukashenko
- Deputy: Natalya Kochanova
- Preceded by: Mikhail Myasnikovich
- Succeeded by: Syarhey Rumas

Personal details
- Born: 21 November 1960 (age 65) Moscow, Russian SFSR, Soviet Union (now Russia)
- Party: Independent
- Education: Moscow Aviation Institute; Belarusian State Economic University; Belarusian State University

Andrei Vladimirovich Kobyakov (Note: Belarusian: Андрэй Уладзімeравіч Кабякоў, romanized: Andrej Uładzimieravič Kabjakow; Russian: Андрей Владимирович Кобяков, romanized: Andrej Vladimirovič Kobjakov) (born 21 November 1960) is a Belarusian politician. He served as the Prime Minister of Belarus between 2014 and 2018, appointed by president Alexander Lukashenko on 27 December 2014. Before this appointment, Kobyakov served as Lukashenko's Chief of Staff from 2012 to 2014.

He was a Deputy Prime Minister from December 2003 to December 2010.

== Early life ==
Andrei Kobyakov was born in Moscow in 1960. From the age of three, he lived in the territory of Belarus.

In 1983, he graduated from the Moscow Aviation Institute. From 1985-1988 he worked first as a senior master, then deputy shop superintendent, and deputy chief of Minsk Mechanical Works assembly plant factory.

In 1991, he graduated from the Belarusian State Institute of National Economy. From 1989-1991 he was a student at the Institute of Political Science and Social Management of the CPB.

== Career ==
From 1995 to 1996 he served as Deputy Chief of the Control Service and from 1996 to 1998 he was the Deputy Chairman of the Belarusian State Control Committee. In June 1998, he became President of the Belarusian State Concern for production and sale of light industry goods.

He was appointed chairman of the State Control Committee on 2 December 1998 by order of the President. On 6 October 2000 he was appointed representative of the State in OAO "Belpromstroibank."

From 2000 to 2001 he was the First Deputy Prime Minister of Belarus. On 24 September 2001 the President appointed him Deputy Prime Minister.

He was the Economy Minister from 3 July 2002 to 24 December 2003.

On 28 December 2010, he served as the Deputy Head of the Presidential Administration of Belarus.

He was appointed Ambassador to Russia on 8 December 2011 and served until 2012.

He was Chief of Staff to the President from 27 August 2012 to 27 December 2014.

== Criticism ==
At a protest rally in Minsk on February 22, 2016, opposition figures Pavel Sevyarynets and Ales Makayev called on Prime Minister Andrei Kobyakov to resign.

On July 17, 2016, the United Civic Party demanded the resignation of Kobyakov’s government in a statement adopted at the party’s 17th congress.

== Personal life ==
Kobyakov is married with a daughter and a son.

== Notes ==
Political offices
Preceded by Mikhail Myasnikovich	Prime Minister of Belarus; 2014–2018	Succeeded by Syarhey Rumas
