= Mikhail Myasnikovich =

7th Prime Minister of Belarus 2010–2014

- Михаил Мясникович; Міхаіл Мясніковіч
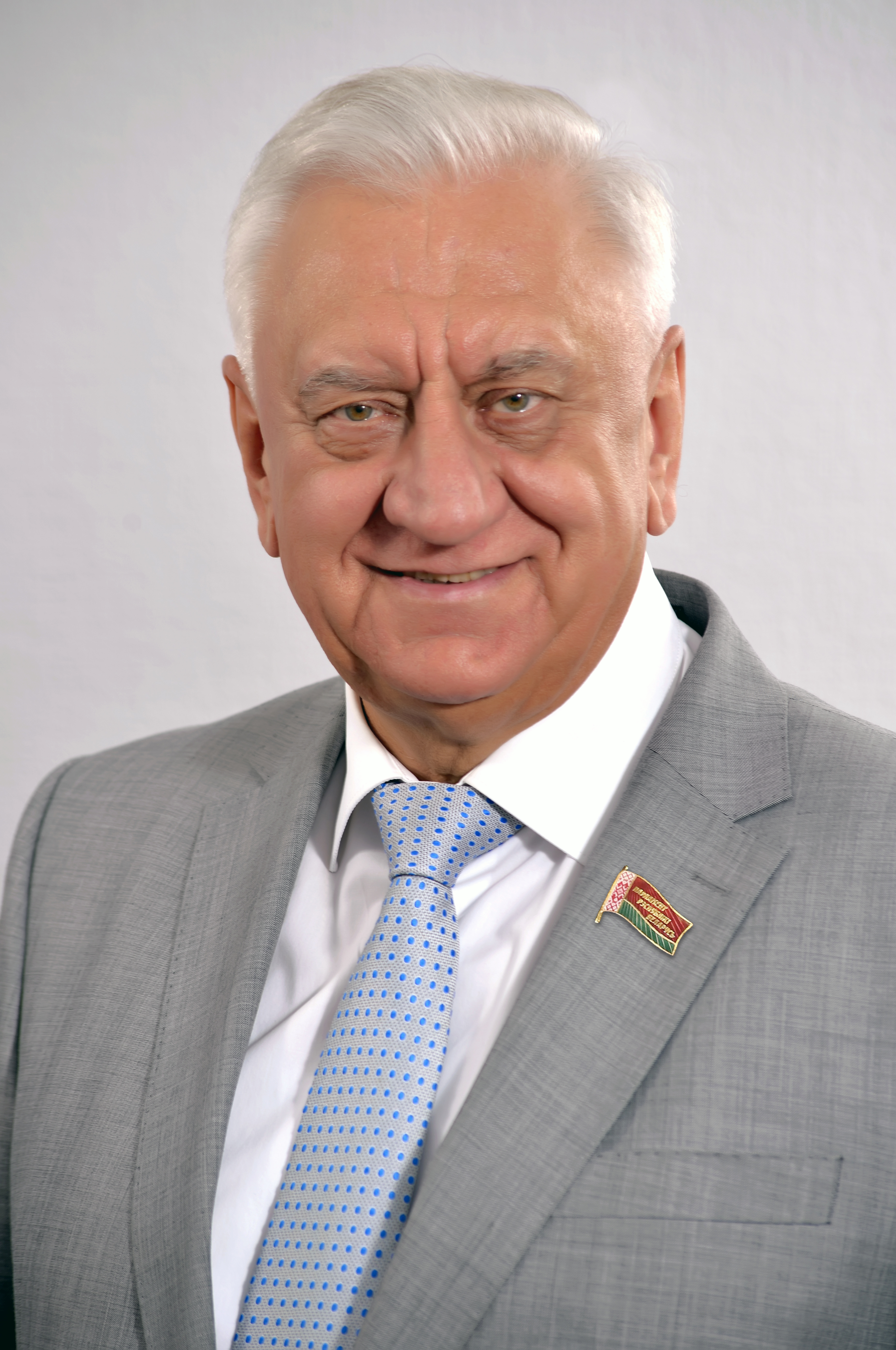
- Myasnikovich in 2017

Chairman of the Board of the Eurasian Economic Commission
- In office 1 February 2020 – 1 February 2024
- Preceded by: Tigran Sargsyan
- Succeeded by: Bakhytjan Sagintayev

Speaker of the Council of the Republic
- In office 16 January 2015 – 4 December 2019
- President: Alexander Lukashenko
- Preceded by: Anatoly Rubinov
- Succeeded by: Natalia Kochanova

7th Prime Minister of Belarus
- In office 28 December 2010 – 27 December 2014
- President: Alexander Lukashenko
- Deputy: Vladimir Semashko
- Preceded by: Sergei Sidorsky
- Succeeded by: Andrei Kobyakov

Personal details
- Born: Mikhail Vladimirovich; Myasnikovich; 6 May 1950 (age 76) Novy Snov, Byelorussian SSR, Soviet Union (now Belarus)
- Party: Independent
- Education: Brest State Technical; University

Mikhail Vladimirovich Myasnikovich (Note: Russian: Михаи́л Влади́мирович Мяснико́вич; Belarusian: Міхаі́л Уладзі́міравіч Мясніко́віч, romanized: Michaił Uładzimiravič Miasnikovič, IPA: [mʲixaˈjiɫ uɫaˈd͡zʲimʲiravʲit͡ʂ mʲasʲnʲiˈkɔvʲit͡ʂ]) (born 6 May 1950) is a Belarusian politician who was Prime Minister of Belarus from 2010 to 2014. He was the Chairman of the Board of the Eurasian Economic Commission from 2020 to 2024.

== Career ==
=== Early years and education ===
Mikhail Myasnikovich was born in Novy Snov, Nesvizh Raion, Minsk Region, Byelorussian SSR, Soviet Union.

In 1972, he graduated as an engineer from Brest State Technical University. In 1972-73, Myasnikovich served in the Soviet Army. From 1973 to 1983 Worked at the Minsk Water Supply and Water Treatment Plant, the Department of Public Utilities' Companies for the Minsk City Executive Committee.

From 1983 to 1984, he was a Chairman of the Executive Committee on the Soviet District Council of Minsk of People's Deputies, and from 1984 to 1985 was a deputy chairman of the Executive Committee of the Minsk City Council of Deputies.

In 1985–1986, he was a secretary of the Minsk City Committee of the Communist Party of Belarus. From 1986 to 1991 worked at the Ministry of Housing and Public Utilities of the BSSR and the Committee for Economy and Planning of the BSSR.

In 1991–1994, he was a deputy prime minister, from 1995 to 2001 head of Administration in the President's Office (1995–2001).

In 2006, Myasnikovich appeared in the United Civic Party list of 50 richest men in Belarus with a $296 mln fortune.

=== Prime Minister of Belarus ===
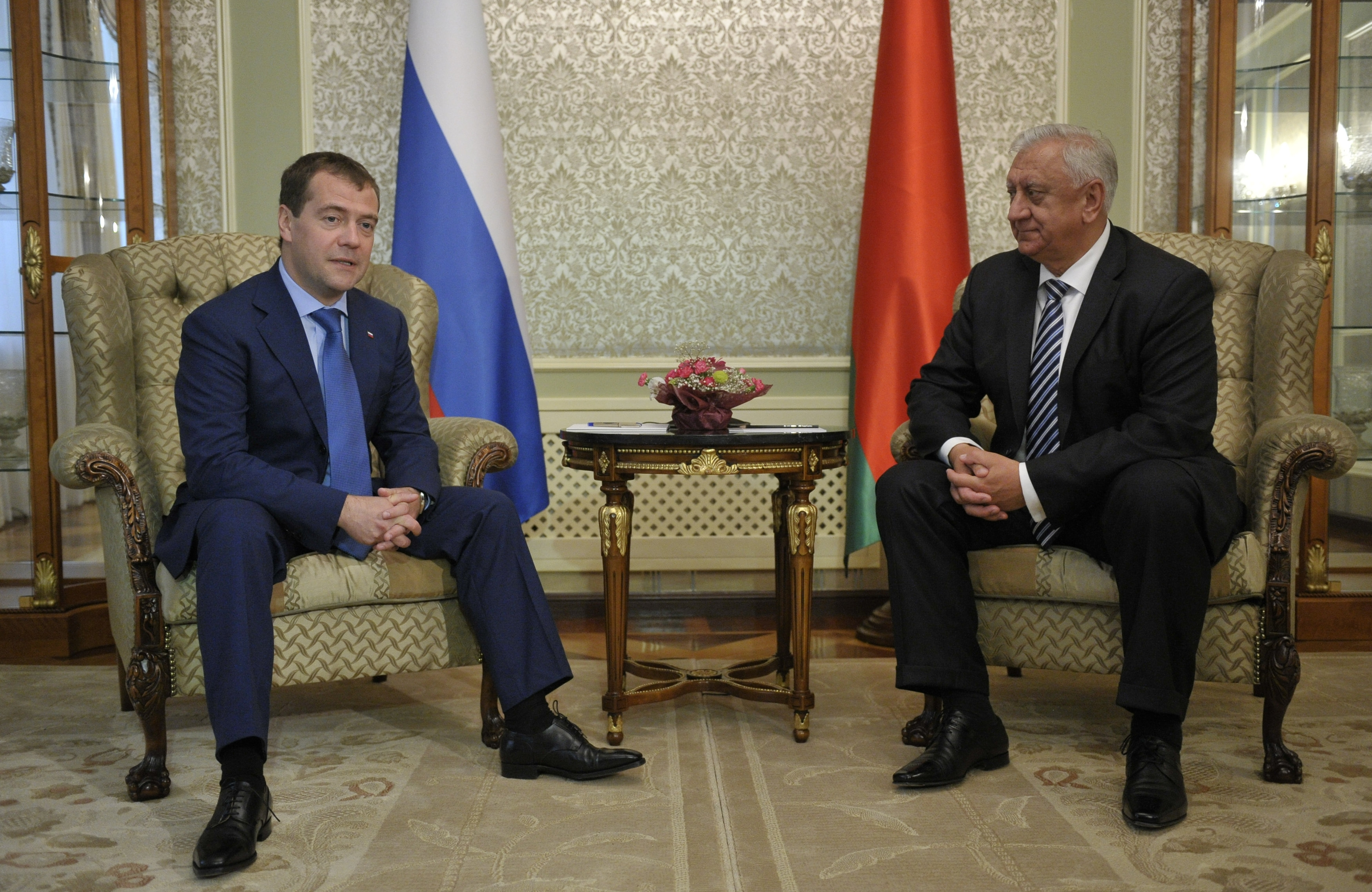
Myasnikovich meeting with Russian Prime Minister Dmitry Medvedev on 18 July 2012

Myasinkovich was appointed by President Alexander Lukashenko to serve as Prime Minister of Belarus following the 2010 presidential election; he served until 27 December 2014.

=== Further career ===
On 20 December 2019, by decision of the heads of state of the Eurasian Economic Union (Russia, Armenia, Belarus, Kazakhstan, Kyrgyzstan), Mikhail Myasnikovich was appointed Chairman of the Board of the Eurasian Economic Commission. He held this position from 1 February 2020 to 1 February 2024, succeeding Tigran Sargsyan, Armenia's representative in the EEC. In 2024, Myasnikovich stepped down, replaced by Bakhytjan Sagintayev.

== In science ==
In 1998, Myasnikovich defended his thesis "Financial and industrial groups and their role in the formation of market relations". In 2003, he became a professor.

He made a significant contribution to the development of the theory of the socially-oriented market economy of the Republic of Belarus, its innovative development and modernisation.

In 2001-2010, Myasnikovich was the chairman of the National Academy of Sciences.

Honorary Doctor of St. Petersburg State University of Economics (2008), Vietnamese Academy of Science and Technology (2011). Honorary Professor of Brest State Technical University (2013), Belarusian State University (2017).

Author of over 160 scientific papers, including 15 monographs on economics and state building.

== Honours and accolades ==
- 1981 — Badge of Honour (Belarus);
- 2000 — Order of the Fatherland (Belarus), III degree;
- 2009 — Order of Friendship;
- 2010 — Friendship Medal (China);
- 2010 — Grand Gold Medal of the National Academy of Sciences of the Republic of Armenia;
- 2020 — Order of the Fatherland (Belarus), II degree;
- 2024 — Stolypin Medal

== Notes ==
Political offices
Preceded by Sergei Sidorsky	Prime Minister of Belarus; 2010–2014	Succeeded by Andrei Kobyakov
