= History of Belarus =

The lands of Belarus during the Middle Ages became part of Kievan Rus' and were split between different regional principalities, including Polotsk, Turov, Vitebsk, and others. Following the Mongol invasions of the 13th century, these lands were absorbed by the Grand Duchy of Lithuania, which later was merged into the Polish–Lithuanian Commonwealth in the 16th century.

Following the Partitions of Poland in the 18th century, Belarusian territories became part of the Russian Empire. In the aftermath of the Russian Revolution, different states arose competing for legitimacy amid the Russian Civil War, ultimately ending with the consolidation of the Belarusian People's Republic, which was replaced by the Byelorussian Soviet Socialist Republic, which became a constituent republic of the Soviet Union when it was founded in 1922.

The republic was devastated as a result of the German occupation during World War II, and its territory was expanded after Western Belorussia was annexed by the Soviet Union as a result of the war. Belarus became an independent state in 1991 following the dissolution of the Soviet Union.

== Prehistoric era ==
Archaeological discoveries show what is now Belarus had human inhabitants during the Paleolithic and Neolithic ages.

== Early history ==
=== Early Slavs ===
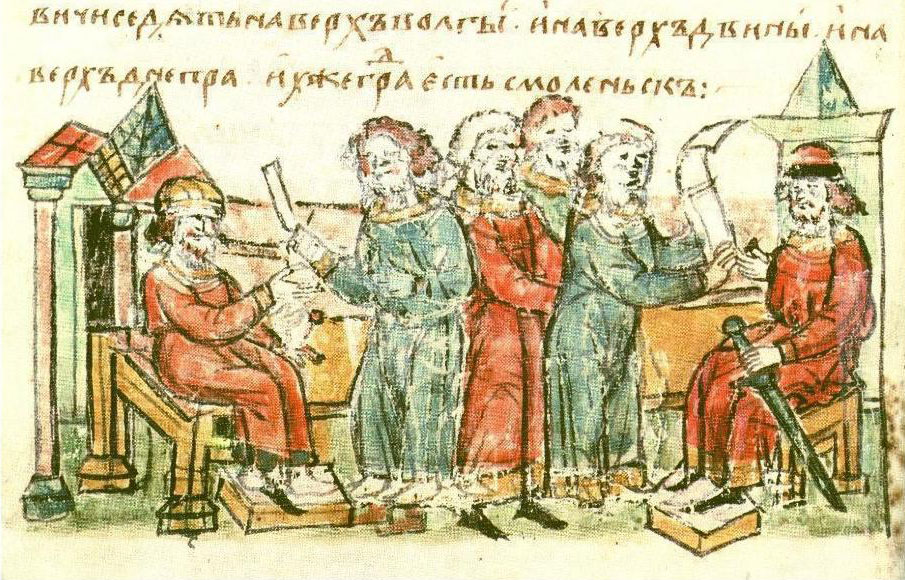
A miniature from Radziwiłł Chronicle showing ancient tribe of Krivichs

Between the 6th and 8th centuries, the migrations and expansion of Slavic peoples across Eastern Europe began. East Slavs settled on the territory of present-day Belarus, where they interacted with and gradually assimilated local Baltic tribes such as the Dnieper Balts and the Yotvingians. These early processes of coexistence and integration laid the foundations for the gradual formation and differentiation of the East Slavic communities in this region. The East Slavs were predominantly pagan, animistic, agrarian people, had an economy which included trade in agricultural produce, game, furs, honey, beeswax and amber.

The modern Belarusian ethnos was probably formed on the basis of the three Slavic tribes: Krivichs, Dregoviches, and Radimichs, and the Baltic people inhabiting the area.

The common cultural bond of Eastern Orthodox Christianity and written Church Slavonic (a literary and liturgical Slavic language developed by 8th-century missionaries Saints Cyril and Methodius) fostered the emergence of a new geopolitical entity, Kievan Rus'.

=== Kievan Rus' ===
Between the 9th and 12th centuries, the Principality of Polotsk (now in northern Belarus) emerged as the dominant center of power in the territory of Belarus, while the Principality of Turov south of it was a lesser power.

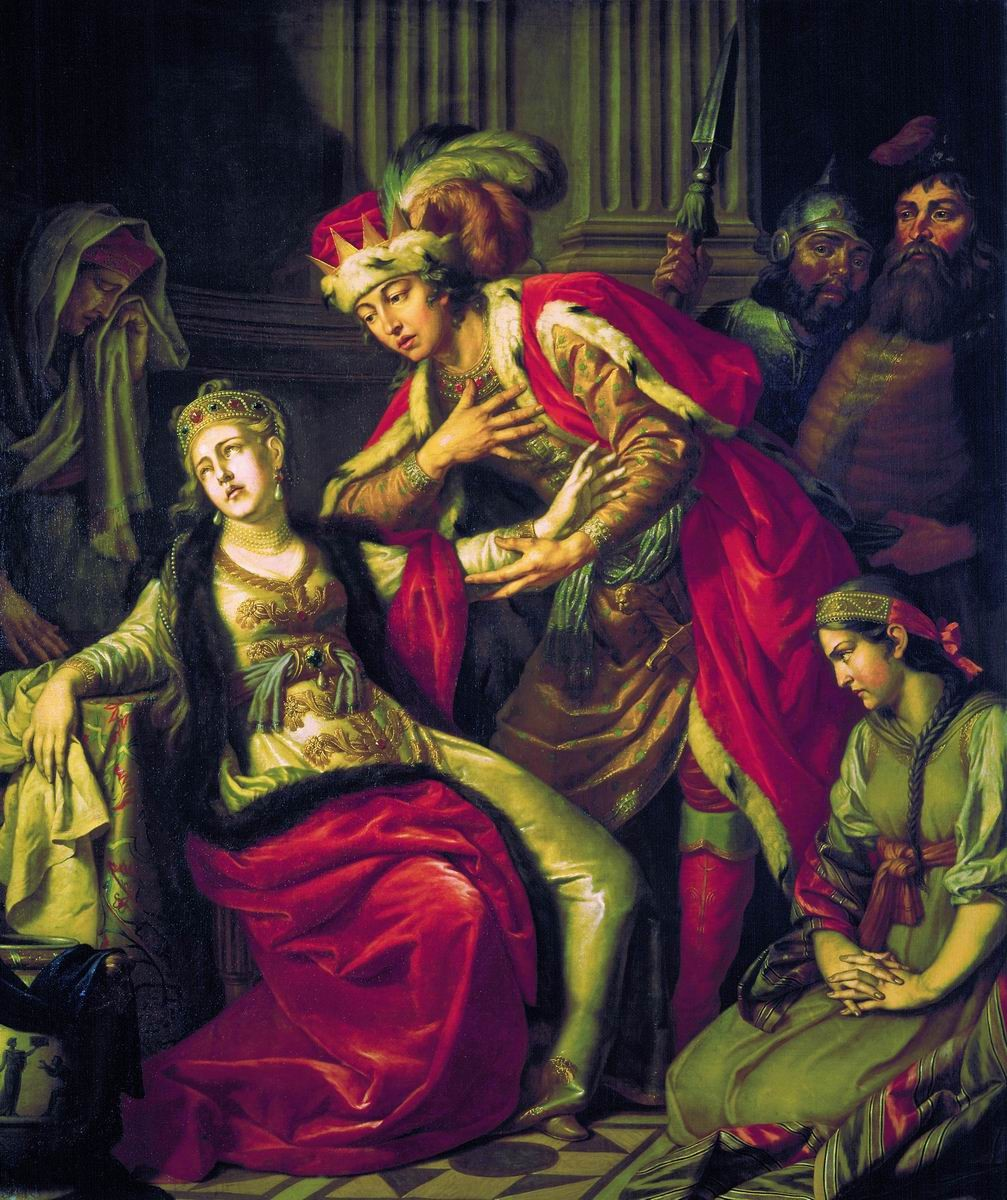
Vladimir I and princess Rogneda of Polotsk (painting of 1770)

The Principality of Polotsk repeatedly asserted its sovereignty in relation to the other centers of Rus', becoming a political capital, the episcopal see of a bishopric and the controller of vassal territories among Balts in the west. The city's Cathedral of the Holy Wisdom (1044–66), though completely rebuilt over the years, remains a symbol of this independent-mindedness, rivaling churches of the same name in Novgorod and Kiev, referring to the original Hagia Sophia in Constantinople (and hence to claims of imperial prestige, authority and sovereignty). Cultural achievements of the Polotsk period include the work of the nun Euphrosyne of Polotsk (1120–1173), who built monasteries, transcribed books, promoted literacy and sponsored art (including local artisan Lazar Bohsha's famous "Cross of Euphrosyne", a national symbol and treasure stolen during World War II), and the prolific, original Church Slavonic sermons and writings of Bishop Kirill of Turov (1130–1182).

=== Grand Duchy of Lithuania ===
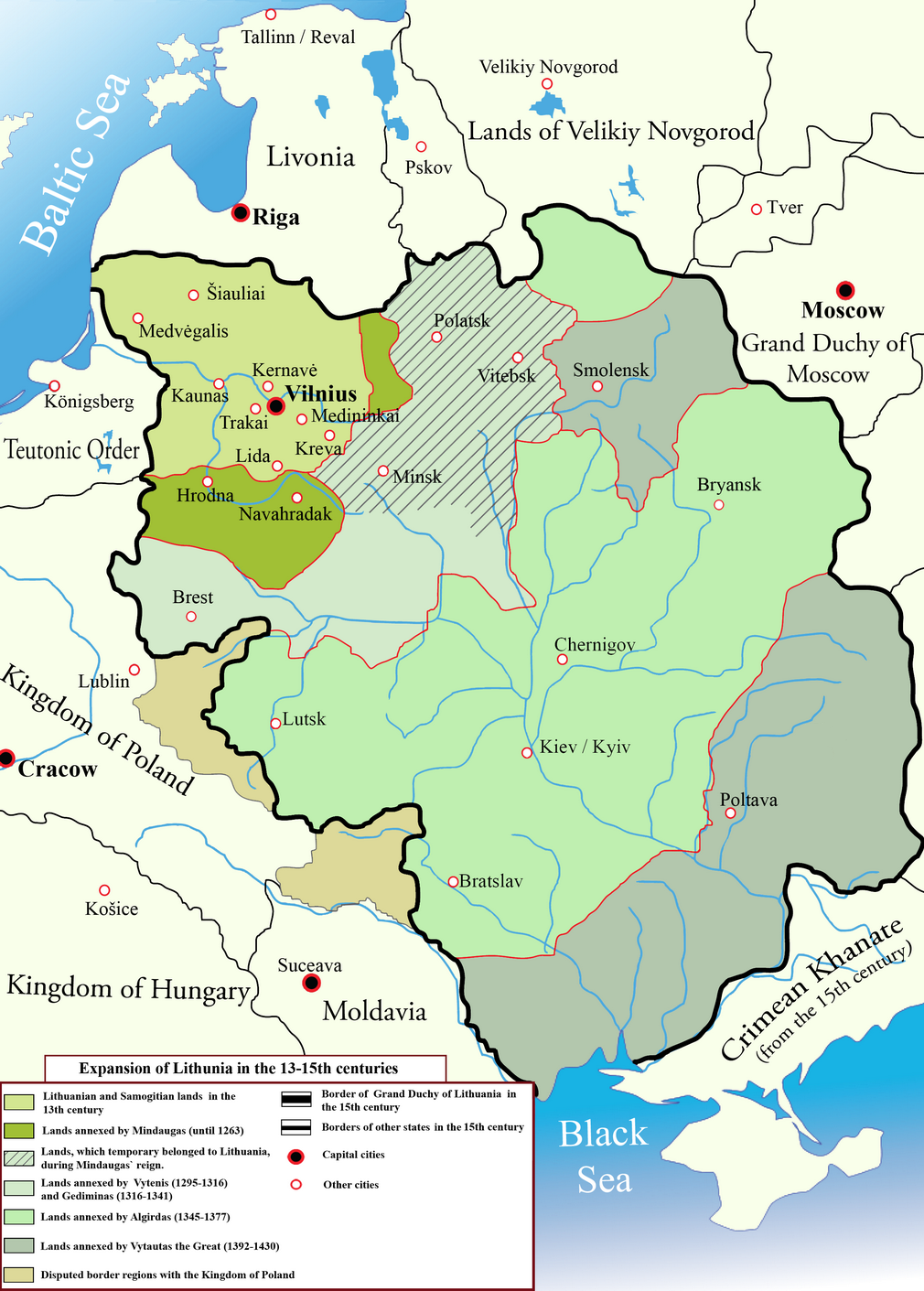
Map of the Grand Duchy of Lithuania, at its greatest extent from the 13th to 15th centuries.

In the 13th century, the fragile unity of Kievan Rus' disintegrated due to nomadic incursions from Asia, which climaxed with the Mongol sacking of Kiev in 1240, leaving a geopolitical vacuum in the region. The East Slavs had splintered into a number of independent and competing principalities. Due to military conquest and dynastic marriages, the western principalities of Rus' in modern Belarus were acquired by the expanding Grand Duchy of Lithuania, beginning with the rule of Lithuanian King Mindaugas (1240–1263). From the 13th to 15th century, the principalities were either conquered or willingly joined the Grand Duchy of Lithuania.

The Lithuanians' smaller numbers in this medieval state gave the Ruthenians (later Belarusians and Ukrainians) an important role in the everyday cultural life of the state. Owing to the prevalence of East Slavs and the Eastern Orthodox faith among the population in eastern and southern regions of the state, the Ruthenian language was a widely used colloquial language.

The East Slavic variety of the language (rus'ka mova, Old Belarusian or West Russian Chancellery language), gradually influenced by Polish, was the language of administration in the Grand Duchy of Lithuania from at least Vytautas' reign until the late 17th century when it was replaced by Polish. This period of political breakdown and reorganization also saw the rise of written local vernaculars in place of the literary and liturgical Church Slavonic language, a further stage in the evolving differentiation between the Belarusian, Russian and Ukrainian languages.

Several Lithuanian monarchs – the last being Švitrigaila in 1432–36 – relied on the Eastern Orthodox Ruthenian majority, while most monarchs and magnates increasingly came to reflect the opinions of the Roman Catholics.

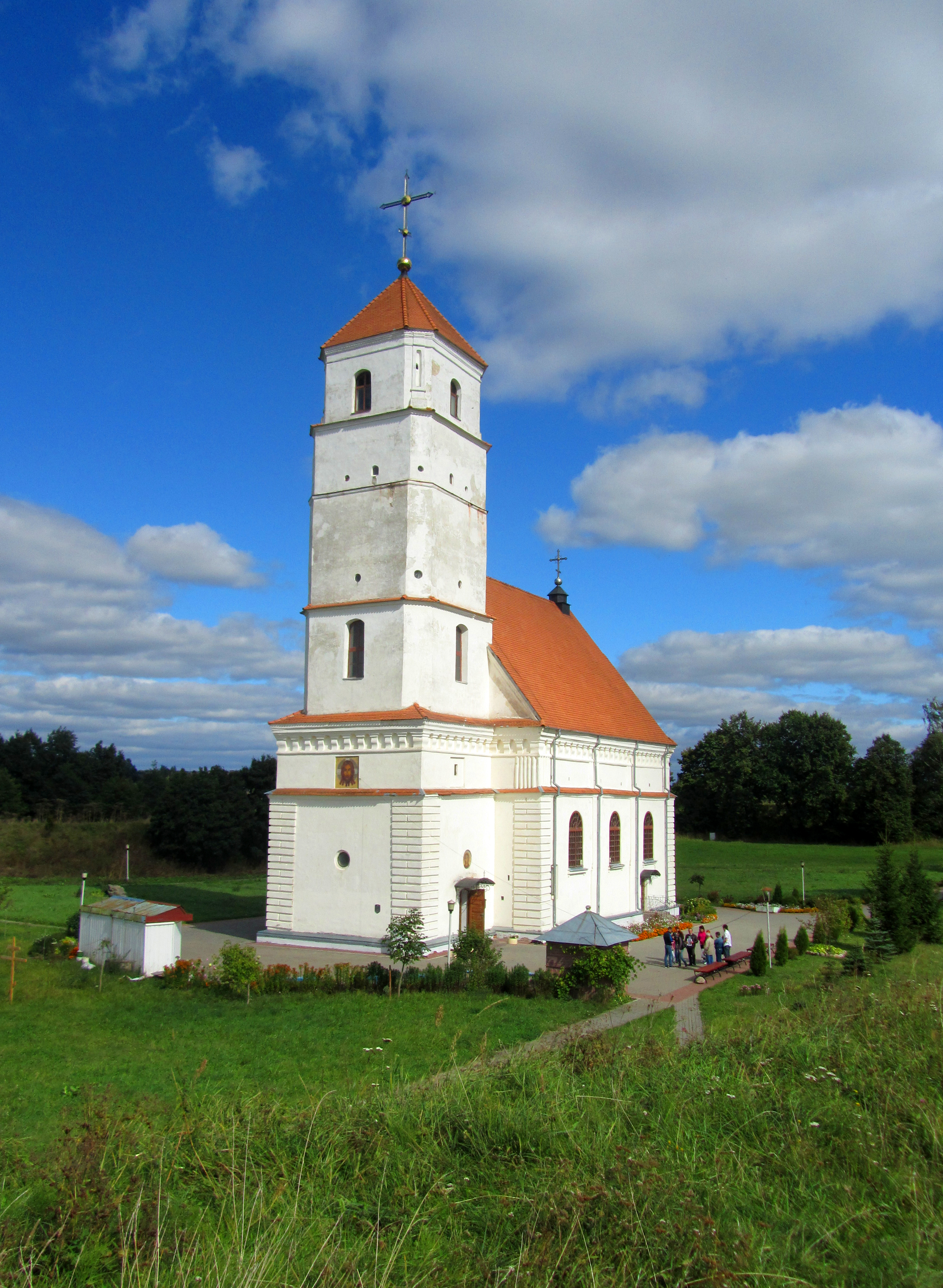
Church of the Saviour's Transfiguration in Zaslawye (1577)

Construction of Orthodox churches in some parts of present-day Belarus had been initially prohibited, as was the case in Vitebsk in 1480. On the other hand, further unification of the mostly Orthodox Grand Duchy with mostly Catholic Poland led to liberalization and a partial solving of the religious problem. In 1511, King and Grand Duke Sigismund I the Old granted the Orthodox clergy an autonomy previously enjoyed only by Catholic clergy. The privilege was enhanced in 1531, when the Orthodox church was no longer responsible to the Catholic bishop and instead the metropolitan was responsible only to the sobor of eight Orthodox bishops, the Grand Duke and the Patriarch of Constantinople. The privilege also extended the jurisdiction of the Orthodox hierarchy over all Orthodox people.

In such circumstances, a vibrant Ruthenian culture flourished, mostly in the major cities of present-day Belarus. Despite the legal usage of the Ruthenian language, which was used as a chancellery language in the territory of the Grand Duchy of Lithuania, literature was mostly non-existent, apart from several chronicles.

== Polish–Lithuanian Commonwealth ==
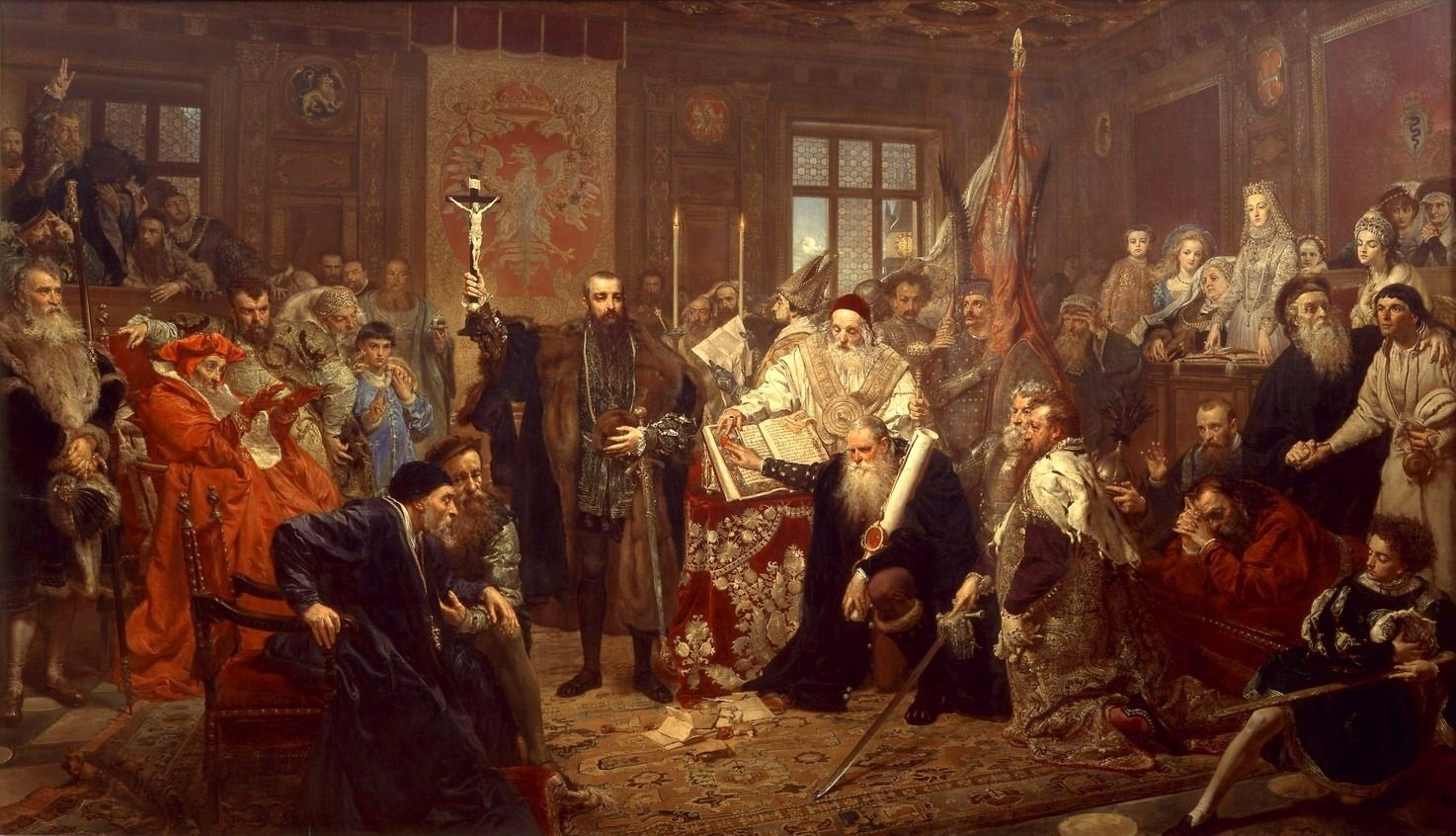
Union of Lublin of 1569, oil on canvas by Jan Matejko, 1869, 298×512 cm, National Museum in Warsaw

The Union of Lublin in 1569 led to the Polish–Lithuanian Commonwealth to become an influential player in European politics and the largest multinational state in Europe. While present-day Ukraine and Podlaskie became subjects of the Polish Crown, present-day Belarusian territories were still regarded as part of the Grand Duchy of Lithuania. The new polity was dominated by densely populated Poland, which had 134 representatives in the Sejm as compared to 46 representatives from the Grand Duchy of Lithuania. However, the Grand Duchy of Lithuania retained significant autonomy, and was governed by a separate code of laws called the Lithuanian Statutes, which codified both civil and property rights. Of the territory of present-day Belarus, Mogilev was the largest urban centre, followed by Vitebsk, Polotsk, Pinsk, Slutsk, and Brest, whose population exceeded 10,000. In addition, Vilna (Vilnius), the capital of the Grand Duchy of Lithuania, also had a significant Ruthenian population.

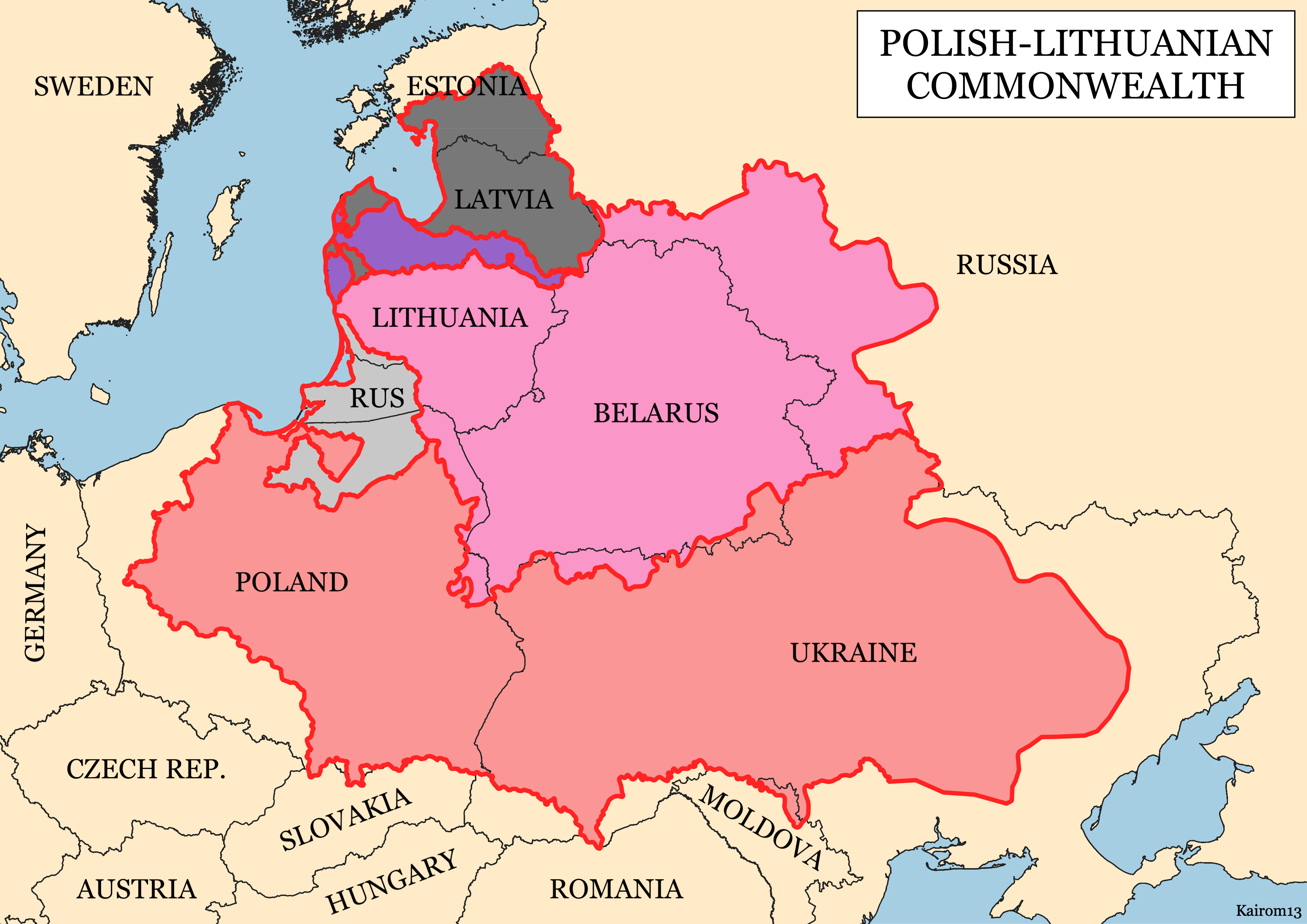
Outline of the Polish–Lithuanian Commonwealth with its major subdivisions after the 1618 Truce of Deulino, superimposed on present-day national borders. Crown of the Kingdom of Poland Grand Duchy of Lithuania Duchy of Livonia Duchy of Prussia, Polish fief Duchy of Courland and Semigallia, Commonwealth fief

With time, the ethnic pattern did not evolve much. Throughout their existence as a separate culture, Ruthenians formed in most cases the rural population, with power held by the local szlachta and boyars, often of Lithuanian, Polish or Russian descent. By this time, a significant Jewish presence had also formed in this region of German Jews fleeing persecution from the Northern and Baltic Crusaders. Since the Union of Horodlo of 1413, the local nobility was assimilated into the traditional clan system by means of the formal procedure of adoption by the szlachta (Polish gentry). Eventually, it formed a significant part of the szlachta. Initially mostly Ruthenian and Orthodox, with time most of them became polonized. This was especially true for major magnate families (Sapieha and Radziwiłł clans being the most notable), whose personal fortunes and properties often surpassed those of the royal families and were huge enough to be called a state within a state.

View of Novogrudok, by Napoleon Orda

Also, with time religious conflicts started to arise. The gentry with time started to adopt Catholicism while the common people by large remained faithful to Eastern Orthodoxy. Initially the Warsaw Compact of 1573 codified the preexisting freedom of worship. However, the rule of an ultra-Catholic King Sigismund III Vasa was marked by numerous attempts to spread Catholicism, mostly through his support for counterreformation and the Jesuits. Possibly to avoid such conflicts, in 1595 the Orthodox hierarchs of Kiev signed the Union of Brest, breaking their links with the Patriarch of Constantinople and placing themselves under the Pope. Although the union was generally supported by most local Orthodox bishops and the king himself, it was opposed by some prominent nobles and, more importantly, by the nascent Cossack movement. This led to a series of conflicts and rebellions against the local authorities. The first of such happened in 1595, when the Cossack insurgents under Severyn Nalyvaiko took the towns of Slutsk and Mogilev and executed Polish magistrates there. Other such clashes took place in Mogilev (1606–10), Vitebsk (1623), and Polotsk (1623, 1633). This left the population of the Grand Duchy divided between Greek Catholic and Greek Orthodox parts. At the same time, after the schism in the Orthodox Church (Raskol), some Old Believers migrated west, seeking refuge in the Rzeczpospolita, which allowed them to freely practice their faith. From 1569, the Polish–Lithuanian Commonwealth suffered a series of Tatar raids, the goal of which was to loot, pillage and capture slaves into jasyr. The borderland area to the south-east was in a state of semi-permanent warfare until the 18th century. Some researchers estimate that altogether more than 3 million people, predominantly Ukrainians but also Russians, Belarusians and Poles, were captured and enslaved during the time of the Crimean Khanate.

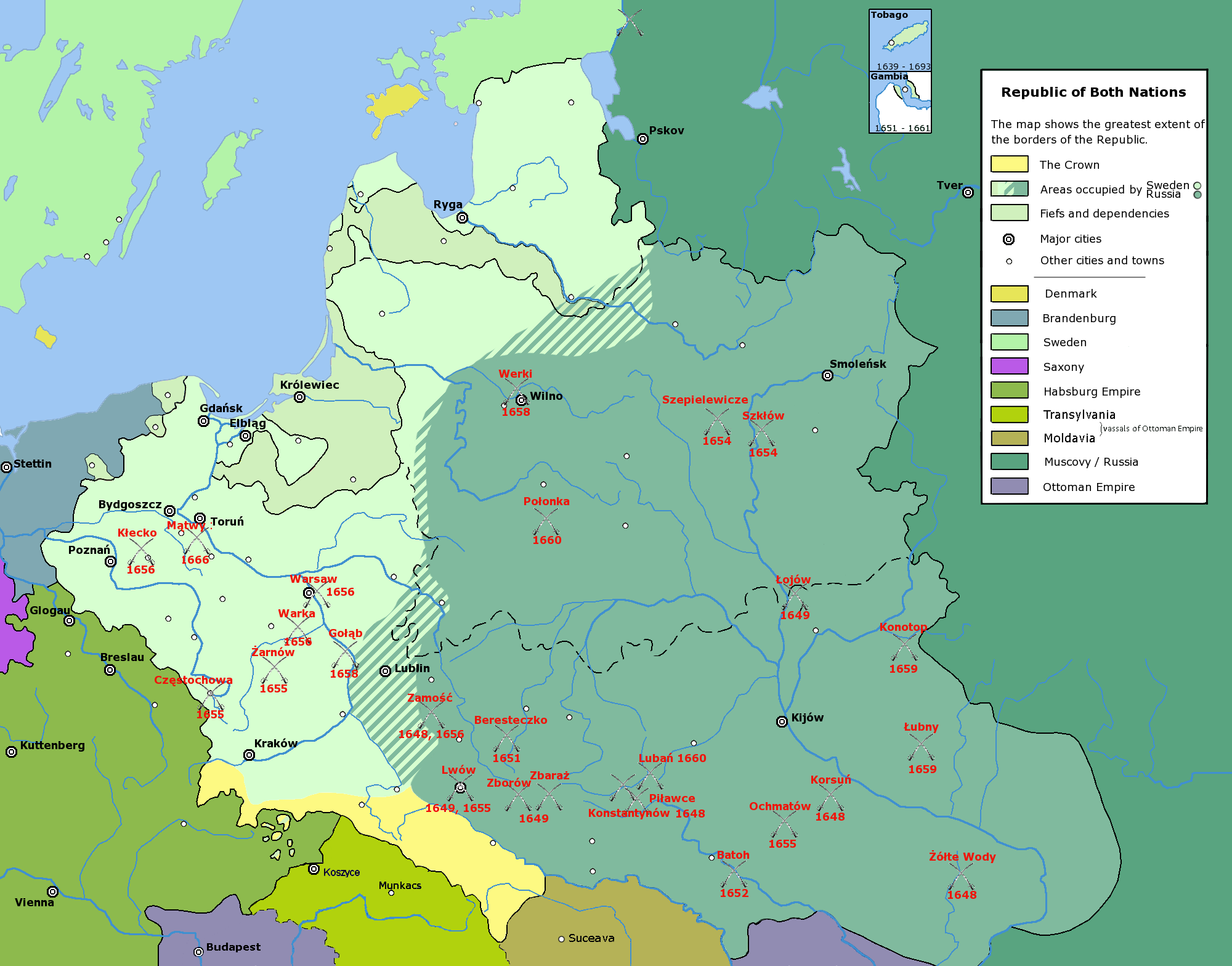
Foreign occupation of the Commonwealth during The Deluge and Khmelnytsky Uprising

Despite these conflicts, the literary tradition of Belarus evolved. Until the 17th century, the Ruthenian language, the predecessor of modern Belarusian, was used in the Grand Duchy as a chancery language, that is, the language used for official documents. Afterwards, it was replaced with the Polish language, commonly spoken by the upper classes. Both Polish and Ruthenian cultures gained a major cultural centre with the foundation of the Academy of Vilna. At the same time, the Belarusian lands entered a path of economic growth, with the formation of numerous towns that served as centres of trade on the east–west routes.

Eventually, by 1795, Poland was partitioned by its neighbors. Thus, a new period in Belarusian history began, with all its lands annexed by the Russian Empire.

== Russian Empire ==
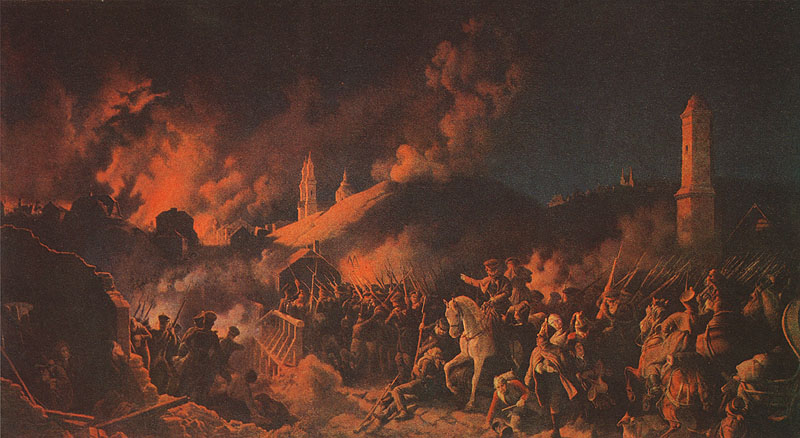
Second battle of Polotsk (1812), as depicted by Peter von Hess

Under Russian administration, the territory of Belarus was divided into the governorates (guberniyas) of Minsk, Vitebsk, Mogilev, and Grodno. Belarusians were active in the guerrilla movement against Napoleon's occupation. With Napoleon's defeat, Belarus again became a part of Imperial Russia and its guberniyas constituted part of the Northwestern Krai. The independence seeking 1830 and 1863 uprisings of the gentry were subdued by the government forces.

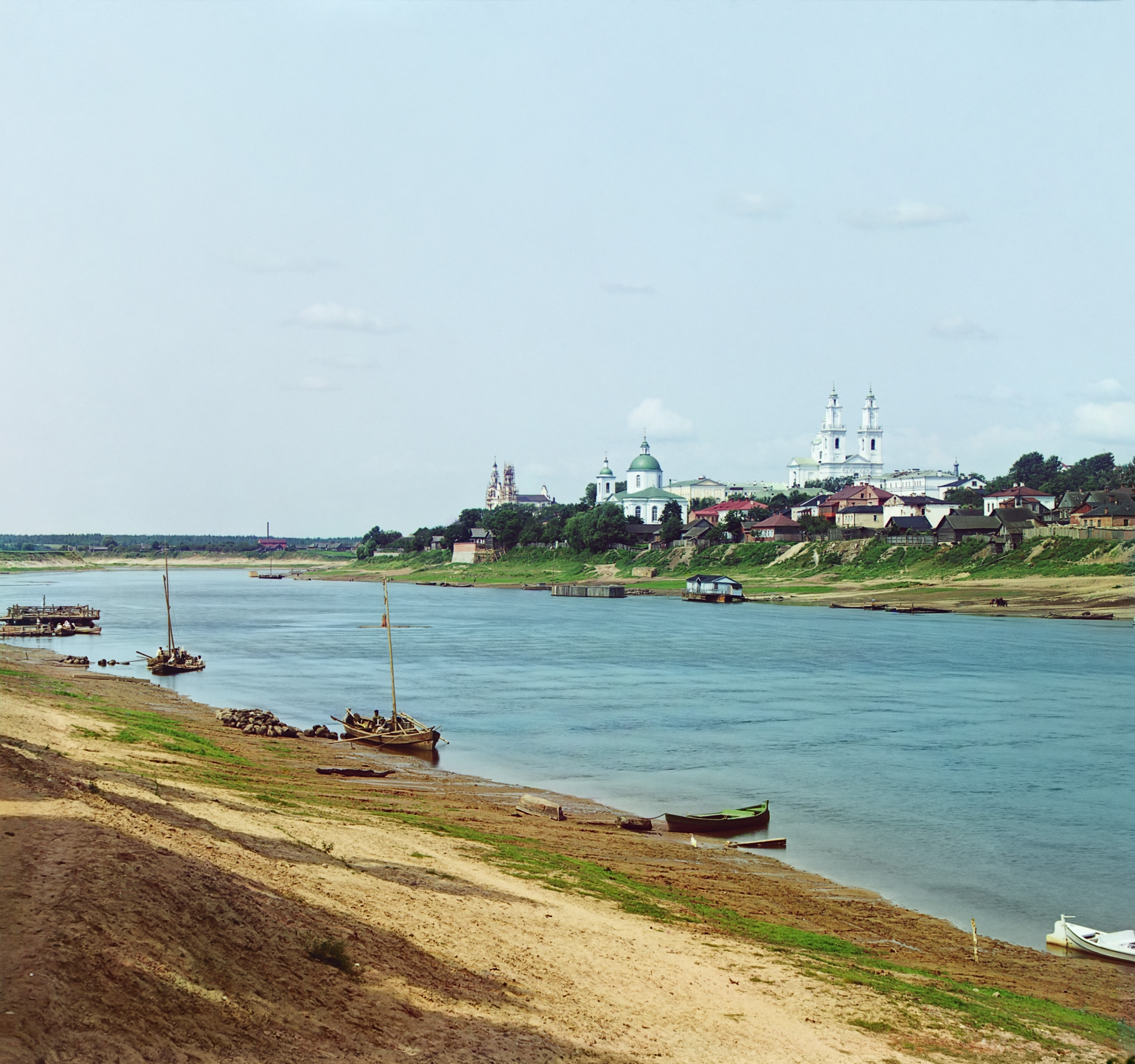
View of Polotsk in 1912

Although under Nicholas I and Alexander III the national cultures were repressed due to the policies of de-Polonization and Russification, which included the return to Orthodoxy, the 19th century signifies the rise of the modern Belarusian nation and self-confidence. A number of authors started publishing in the Belarusian language, including Jan Czeczot, Władysław Syrokomla and Konstanty Kalinowski. In 1862–1863, Kalinowski published first newspaper in modern Belarusian language, Mużyckaja prauda (Peasants' Truth), in a Latin script.

In the second half of the 19th century, the Belarusian economy, like that of the entire Europe, was experiencing significant growth due to the spread of the Industrial Revolution to Eastern Europe, particularly after the emancipation of the serfs in 1861 and the construction of railways in the late 19th century (with Minsk, Vitebsk, Grodno, Pinsk, and Gomel becoming significant industrial centres).

== 20th century ==
=== BNR and LBSSR ===
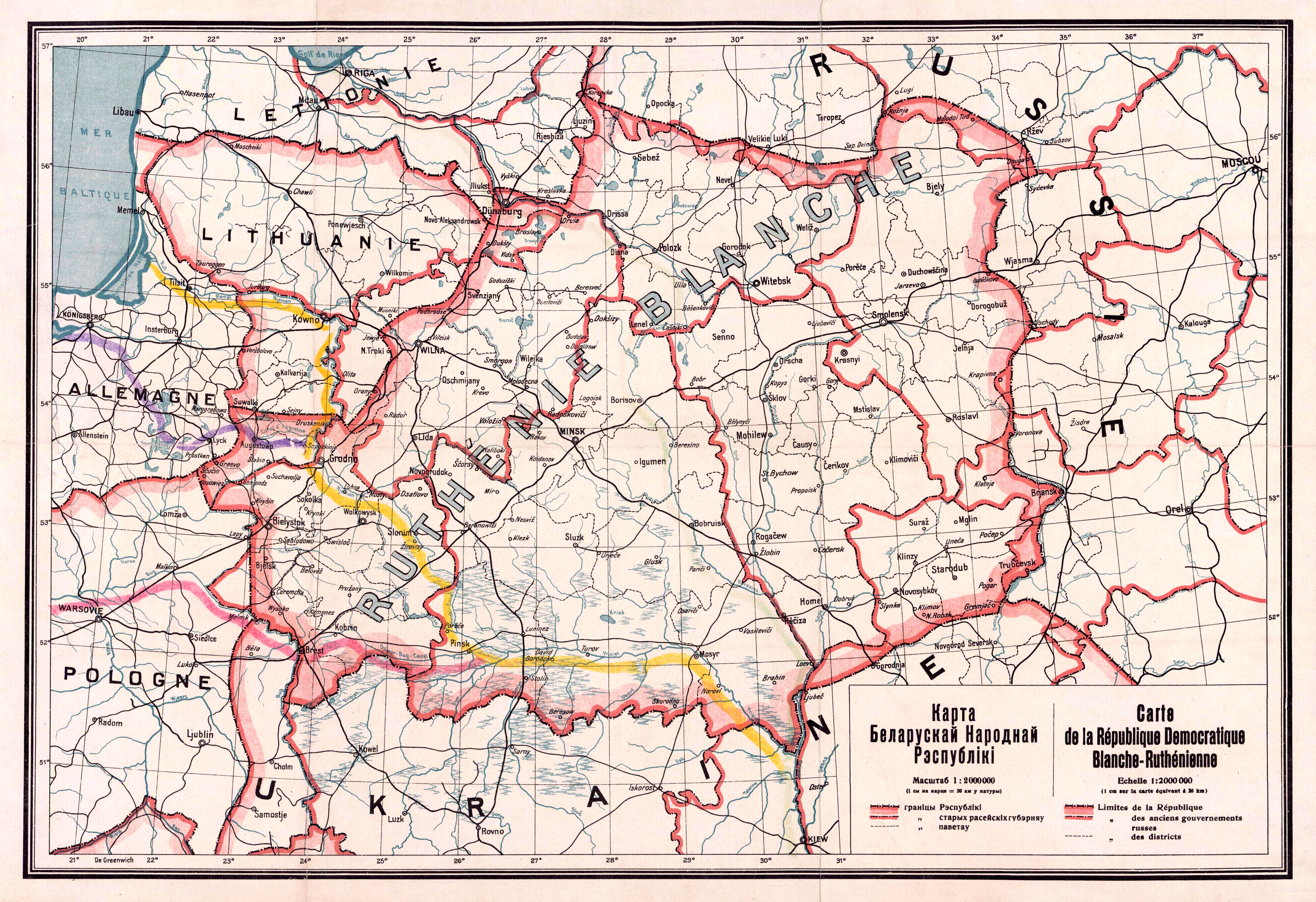
The territory claimed by the Belarusian People's Republic, 1918

On 21 February 1918, Minsk was captured by German troops. World War I was the short period when Belarusian culture started to flourish. German administration allowed schools with Belarusian language, previously banned in Russia; a number of Belarusian schools were created until 1919 when they were banned again by the Polish military administration. At the end of World War I, when Belarus was still occupied by Germans, according to the Treaty of Brest-Litovsk, the short-lived People's Republic of Belarus was pronounced on 25 March 1918, as part of the German Mitteleuropa plan.

The flag of the Belarusian People's Republic in 1918 and of the Republic of Belarus in 1991–1995

In December 1918, Mitteleuropa was obsolete as the German Empire withdrew from the Ober-Ost territory, and for the next few years in the newly created power vacuum the territories of Belarus would witness the struggle of various national and foreign factions. On 3 December 1918 the Germans withdrew from Minsk. On 10 December 1918 Soviet troops occupied Minsk. The Rada (Council) of the People's Republic of Belarus went into exile, first to Kaunas, then to Berlin and finally to Prague. On 2 January 1919, the Soviet Socialist Republic of Byelorussia was declared. On 17 February 1919 it was disbanded. Part of it was included into Russian SFSR, and part was joined to the Lithuanian SSR to form the LBSSR, Lithuanian–Byelorussian Soviet Socialist Republic, informally known as Litbel, whose capital was Vilnius. While Belarus National Republic faced off with Litbel, foreign powers were preparing to reclaim what they saw as their territories: Polish forces were moving from the West, and Russians from the East. When Vilnius was captured by Polish forces on 17 April 1919, the capital of the Soviet puppet state Litbel was moved to Minsk. On 17 July 1919 Lenin dissolved Litbel because of the pressure of Polish forces advancing from the West. Polish troops captured Minsk on 8 August 1919.

=== Republic of Central Lithuania ===
The Republic of Central Lithuania was a short-lived political entity within a territory now split between modern Lithuania and Belarus. It was the last attempt to restore Lithuania in the historical confederacy state (it was also supposed to create Lithuania Upper and Lithuania Lower). The republic was created in 1920 following the staged rebellion of soldiers of the 1st Lithuanian–Belarusian Division of the Polish Army under Lucjan Żeligowski. Centered on the historical capital of the Grand Duchy of Lithuania, Vilna (Lithuanian: Vilnius, Polish: Wilno), for 18 months the entity served as a buffer state between Poland, upon which it depended, and Lithuania, which claimed the area. After a variety of delays, a disputed election took place on 8 January 1922, and the territory was annexed to Poland. Żeligowski later in his memoir which was published in London in 1943 condemned the annexation of Republic by Poland, as well as the policy of closing Belarusian schools and general disregard of Marshal Józef Piłsudski's confederation plans by Polish ally.

=== Belarusian Soviet Republic and West Belarus ===
Some time in 1918 or 1919, Sergiusz Piasecki returned to Belarus, joining Belarusian anti-Soviet units, the "Green Oak" (in Polish, Zielony Dąb), led by Ataman Wiaczesław Adamowicz (pseudonym: J. Dziergacz). When on 8 August 1919, the Polish Army captured Minsk, Adamowicz decided to work with them. Thus Belarusian units were created, and Piasecki was transferred to a Warsaw school of infantry cadets. In the summer of 1920, during the Polish–Soviet War, Piasecki fought in the Battle of Radzymin.

The frontiers between Poland, which had established an independent government after World War I, and the former Russian Empire were not recognized by the League of Nations. Poland's Józef Piłsudski, who envisioned the formation of an Intermarium federation as a Central and East European bloc that would be a bulwark against Germany to the west and Russia to the east, carried out a Kiev offensive into Ukraine in 1920. This met with a Red Army counter-offensive that drove into Polish territory almost to Warsaw, Minsk itself was re-captured by the Soviet Red Army on 11 July 1920 and a new Byelorussian Soviet Socialist Republic was declared on 31 July 1920. Piłsudski, however, halted the Soviet advance at the Battle of Warsaw and resumed his eastward offensive. Finally the Treaty of Riga, ending the Polish–Soviet War, divided Belarus between Poland and Soviet Russia. Over the next two years, the People's Republic of Belarus prepared a national uprising, ceasing the preparations only when the League of Nations recognized the Soviet Union's western borders on 15 March 1923. The Soviets terrorised Western Belarus, the most radical case being Soviet raid on Stołpce. Poland created Border Protection Corps in 1924.

The Polish part of Belarus was subject to Polonization policies (especially in the 1930s), while the Soviet Belarus was one of the original republics which formed the USSR. For several years, the national culture and language enjoyed a significant boost of revival in the Soviet Belarus. A Polish Autonomous District was also formed. This was however soon ended during the Great Purge, when almost all prominent Belarusian national intelligentsia were executed, many of them buried in Kurapaty. Thousands were deported to Asia. As the result of Polish operation of the NKVD tens of thousands people of many nationalities were killed. Belarusian orthography was Russified in 1933 and use of Belarusian language was discouraged as exhibiting anti-soviet attitude.

In West Belarus, up to 30,000 families of Polish veterans (osadniks) were settled in the lands formerly belonging to the Russian tsar family and Russian aristocracy. Belarusian representation in Polish parliament was reduced as a result of the 1930 elections. Since the early 1930s, the Polish government introduced a set of policies designed to Polonize all minorities (Belarusians, Ukrainians, Jews, etc.). The usage of Belarusian language was discouraged and the Belarusian schools were facing severe financial problems. In spring of 1939, there already was neither single Belarusian official organisation in Poland nor a single exclusively Belarusian school (with only 44 schools teaching Belarusian language left).

=== World War II and the Nazi Occupation ===
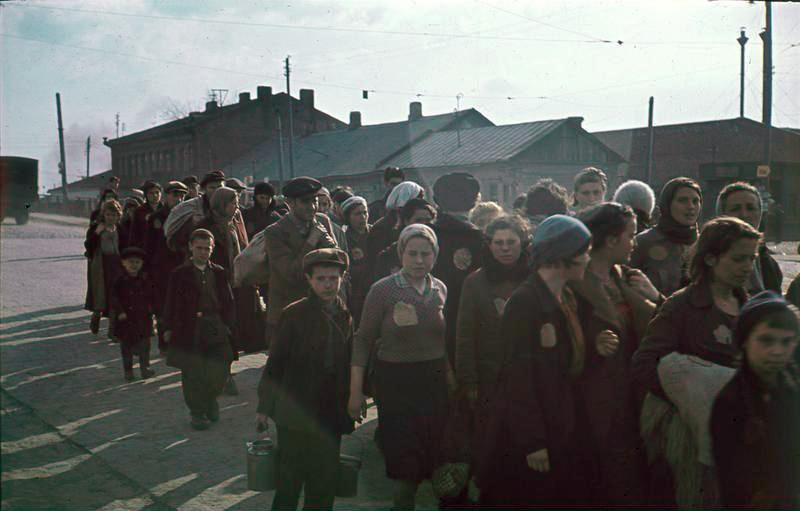
Jews in the Minsk Ghetto, 1941

When the Soviet Union invaded Poland on 17 September 1939, following the terms of the Molotov–Ribbentrop Pact's secret protocol, Western Byelorussia, which was part of Poland, is included in the BSSR. Similarly to the times of German occupation during World War I, Belarusian language and Soviet culture enjoyed relative prosperity in this short period. Already in October 1940, over 75% of schools used the Belarusian language, also in the regions where no Belarus people lived, e.g. around Łomża, what was Ruthenization. Western Belarus was sovietised, tens of thousands were imprisoned in Gulag camps, exiled and many were executed as "enemies of the people". The victims were mostly Polish and Jewish.

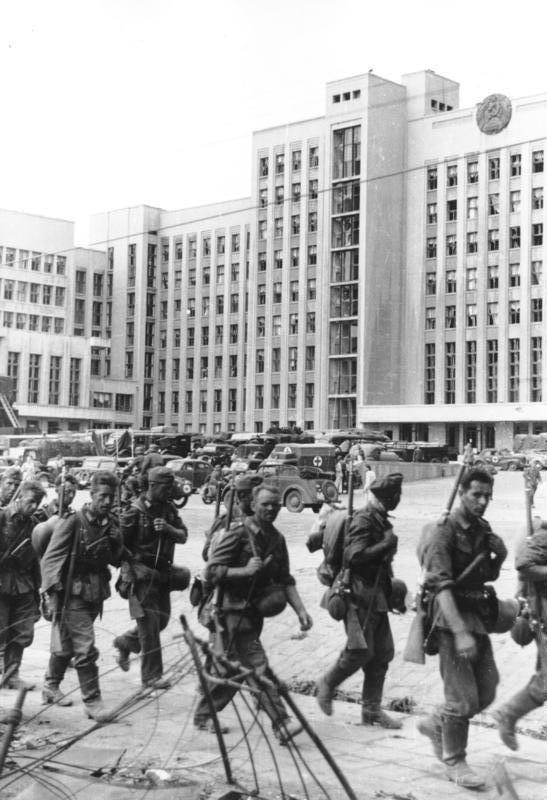
German troops in Minsk during their occupation of the city, August 1941

After twenty months of Soviet rule, Nazi Germany and its Axis allies invaded the Soviet Union on 22 June 1941. Soviet authorities immediately evacuated about 20% of the population of Belarus, killed thousands of prisoners and destroyed all the food supplies. The country suffered particularly heavily during the fighting and the German occupation. Minsk was captured by the Germans on 28 June 1941. Following bloody encirclement battles, all of the present-day Belarus territory was occupied by the Germans by the end of August 1941.

During World War II, the Nazis attempted to establish a puppet Belarusian government, Belarusian Central Rada, with the symbolics similar to BNR. In reality, however, the Germans imposed a brutal racist regime, burning down some 9,000 Belarusian villages, deporting some 380,000 people for slave labour, and killing hundreds of thousands of civilians more. Local police took part in many of those crimes. Almost the whole, previously very numerous, Jewish populations of Belarus that did not evacuate were killed. One of the first uprisings of a Jewish ghetto against the Nazis occurred in 1942 in Belarus, in the small town of Lakhva.

Since the early days of the occupation, a powerful and increasingly well-coordinated Belarusian resistance movement emerged. Hiding in the woods and swamps, the partisans inflicted heavy damage to German supply lines and communications, disrupting railway tracks, bridges, telegraph wires, attacking supply depots, fuel dumps and transports and ambushing German soldiers. Not all anti-German partisans were pro-Soviet. In the largest partisan sabotage action of the entire Second World War, the so-called Asipovichy diversion of 30 July 1943 four German trains with supplies and Tiger tanks were destroyed. To fight partisan activity, the Germans had to withdraw considerable forces behind their front line. On 22 June 1944 the huge Soviet offensive Operation Bagration was launched, Minsk was re-captured on 3 July 1944, and all of Belarus was regained by the end of August. Hundred thousand of Poles were expelled after 1944. As part of the Nazis' effort to combat the enormous Belarusian resistance during World War II, special units of local collaborationists were trained by the SS's Otto Skorzeny to infiltrate the Soviet rear. In 1944 thirty Belarusians (known as Čorny Kot (Black Cat) and personally led by Michał Vituška) were airdropped by the Luftwaffe behind the lines of the Red Army, which had already liberated Belarus during Operation Bagration. They experienced some initial success due to disorganization in the rear of the Red Army, and some other German-trained Belarusian nationalist units also slipped through the Białowieża Forest in 1945. The NKVD, however, had already infiltrated these units. Vituška himself was hunted down, captured and executed, although he continued to live on in Belarusian nationalist hagiography.

In total, Belarus lost a quarter of its pre-war population in World War II including practically all its intellectual elite. About 9,200 villages and 1.2 million houses were destroyed. The major towns of Minsk and Vitsebsk lost over 80% of their buildings and city infrastructure. For the defence against the Germans, and the tenacity during the German occupation, the capital Minsk was awarded the title Hero City after the war. The fortress of Brest was awarded the title Hero-Fortress.

=== Post-war BSSR ===
After the end of War in 1945, Belarus became one of the founding members of the United Nations Organisation. Joining Belarus was the Soviet Union itself and another republic Ukraine. In exchange for Belarus and Ukraine joining the UN, the United States had the right to seek two more votes, a right that has never been exercised.

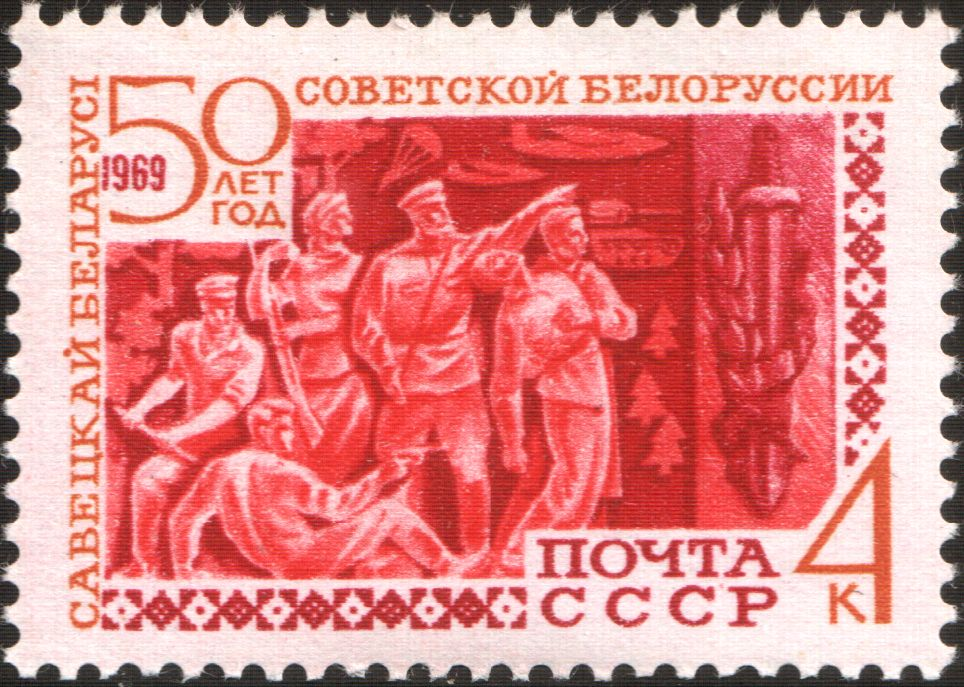
50 years of Soviet Belarus – a Soviet postage stamp of 1969

More than 200,000 ethnic Poles left or were expelled to Poland in late 1940s and late 1950s, some killed by the NKVD or deported to Siberia. Armia Krajowa and post-AK resistance was the strongest in the Grodno, Vawkavysk, Lida and Shchuchyn regions.

The Belarusian economy was completely devastated by the events of the war. Most of the industry, including whole production plants were removed either to Russia or Germany. Industrial production of Belarus in 1945 amounted for less than 20% of its pre-war size. Most of the factories evacuated to Russia, with several spectacular exceptions, were not returned to Belarus after 1945. During the immediate postwar period, the Soviet Union first rebuilt and then expanded the BSSR's economy, with control always exerted exclusively from Moscow. During this time, Belarus became a major center of manufacturing in the western region of the USSR. Huge industrial objects like the BelAZ, MAZ, and the Minsk Tractor Plant were built in the country. The increase in jobs resulted in a huge immigrant population of Russians in Belarus. Russian became the official language of administration and the peasant class, which traditionally was the base for Belarusian nation, ceased to exist.

=== Perestroika and Glasnost ===
On 26 April 1986, the Chernobyl disaster occurred at the Chernobyl Nuclear Power Plant in Ukraine situated close to the border with Belarus. It is regarded as the worst nuclear accident in the history of nuclear power. It produced a plume of radioactive debris that drifted over parts of the western Soviet Union, Eastern Europe, and Scandinavia. Large areas of Belarus, Ukraine and Russia were contaminated, resulting in the evacuation and resettlement of roughly 200,000 people. About 60% of the radioactive fallout landed in Belarus. The effects of the Chernobyl accident in Belarus were dramatic: about 50,000 km^{2} (or about a quarter of the territory of Belarus) formerly populated by 2.2 million people (or a fifth of the Belarusian population) now require permanent radioactive monitoring (after receiving doses over 37 kBq/m^{2} of caesium-137). 135,000 persons were permanently resettled and many more were resettled temporarily. After 10 years since the accident, the occurrences of thyroid cancer among children increased fifteenfold (the sharp rise started in about four years after the accident).

On 27 July 1990, Belarus declared its national sovereignty, a key step toward independence from the Soviet Union. Around that time, Stanislav Shushkevich became the chairman of the Supreme Soviet of Belarus, the top leadership position in Belarus.

On 25 August 1991, after the failure of the August Coup in Moscow, Belarus declared full independence from the USSR by granting the declaration of state sovereignty a constitutional status that it did not have before.

== Republic of Belarus ==
=== Independent country and the Commonwealth ===
Pahonia, the Coat of Arms of the People's Republic of Belarus in 1918 and of the Republic of Belarus in 1991–1995

On 8 December 1991, Shushkevich met with Boris Yeltsin of Russia and Leonid Kravchuk of Ukraine, in Belavezhskaya Pushcha, to formally declare the dissolution of the Soviet Union and the formation of the Commonwealth of Independent States.

Post-Soviet countries have signed a series of treaties and agreements to settle the legacy of the former Soviet Union multilaterally and bilaterally.

=== Lukashenko era ===
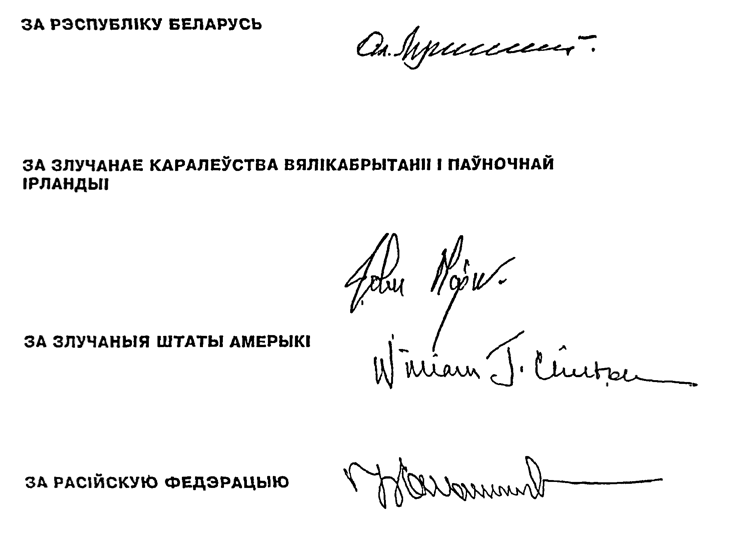
Signatures on the Budapest Memorandum for security assurances to Belarus in exchange for national denuclearization

A new Belarusian constitution enacted in early 1994 paved the way for the first democratic presidential election on 23 June and 10 July. Alexander Lukashenko was elected president of Belarus. Having assumed the rights and responsibilities of the Soviet Union on the territory of Byelarus, in December 1994 Lukashenko signed the Budapest Memorandum along with Russia, the United Kingdom and the United States acting as guarantors and thereby denuclearized the nation.

The 1996 referendum resulted in amendments to the constitution that removed key powers from the parliament.

In 1999 opposition leaders Yury Zacharanka and Viktar Hanchar disappeared and were presumably killed. In 2001, Lukashenko was re-elected as president in elections described as undemocratic by Western observers. At the same time, the west began criticizing him as authoritarian. In 2006, Lukashenko was once again re-elected in presidential elections again criticized as flawed by most European Union countries.

In 2010, Lukashenko was re-elected once again in presidential elections which were again described as falsified by most EU countries and organizations such as the OSCE. A peaceful protest against the electoral flaws turned into a riot when demonstrators tried to storm a government building. The police used batons to quell the riot. Seven presidential candidates and hundreds of rioters were arrested by KGB.

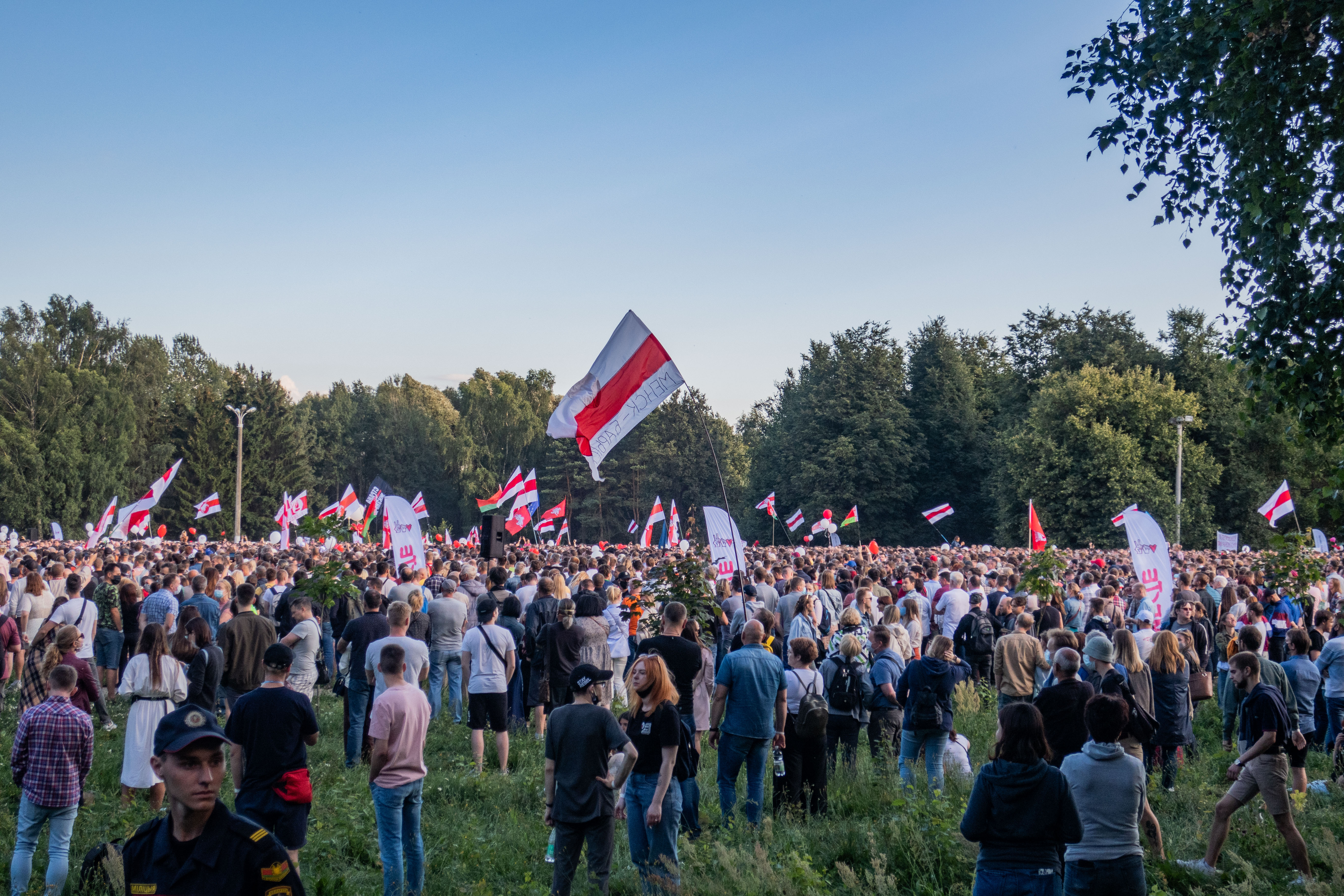
2020–21 Belarusian protests

Lukashenko's disputed victory in the country's 2020 presidential election led to widespread allegations of vote rigging, which strongly amplified anti-government protests, the largest during his rule. Protesters have faced violent persecution by the authorities. A statement by the United Nations Human Rights Office on 1 September cited more than 450 documented cases of torture and ill-treatment of detainees, as well as reports of sexual abuse and rape. Several protesters were killed. Following the contested election, Lukashenko is not recognized by the United Kingdom, the European Union, or the United States as the legitimate president of Belarus.

On 23 May 2021, Ryanair Flight 4978 was diverted by the Belarusian government to Minsk National Airport, where two of its passengers, opposition activist and former editor-in-chief of the Telegram channel Nexta Roman Protasevich and his girlfriend Sofia Sapega, were arrested by authorities. In summer of the same year, Belarusian authorities organized the 2021–2022 Belarus–European Union border crisis consisting of an influx of tens of thousands of immigrants, primarily from Iraqi Kurdistan, to Lithuania, Latvia, and Poland via those countries' borders with Belarus.

Belarus allowed its territory to be used by the Russian army in the 2022 Russian invasion of Ukraine to stage and launch forces from the north into Ukraine.

== See also ==
- Outline of Belarus
- History of Europe
- White Ruthenia

== Bibliography ==
- Thomas M. Bohn, Weißrussland oder Belarus? Die Weiße Ruß in Historiographie und Kartographie. Harassowitz, Wiesbaden 2025, ISBN 978-3-447-12380-8.
- Ioffe, Grigory; Silitski, Vitali (15 August 2018). Historical Dictionary of Belarus. Rowman & Littlefield. ISBN 978-1-5381-1706-4.
- Shved, Viachaslau; Grzybowski, Jerzy (2020). Historia Białorusi. Od czasów najdawniejszych do roku 1991 [History of Belarus. From the earliest times to 1991] (in Polish). Warsaw: WUW.
