= Prime Minister of Belarus =

Deputy head of government

Prime Minister of the Republic of Belarus
- Belarusian: Прэм’ер-міністр Рэспублікі Беларусь; Russian: Премьер-министр Республики Беларусь
- Emblem of Belarus

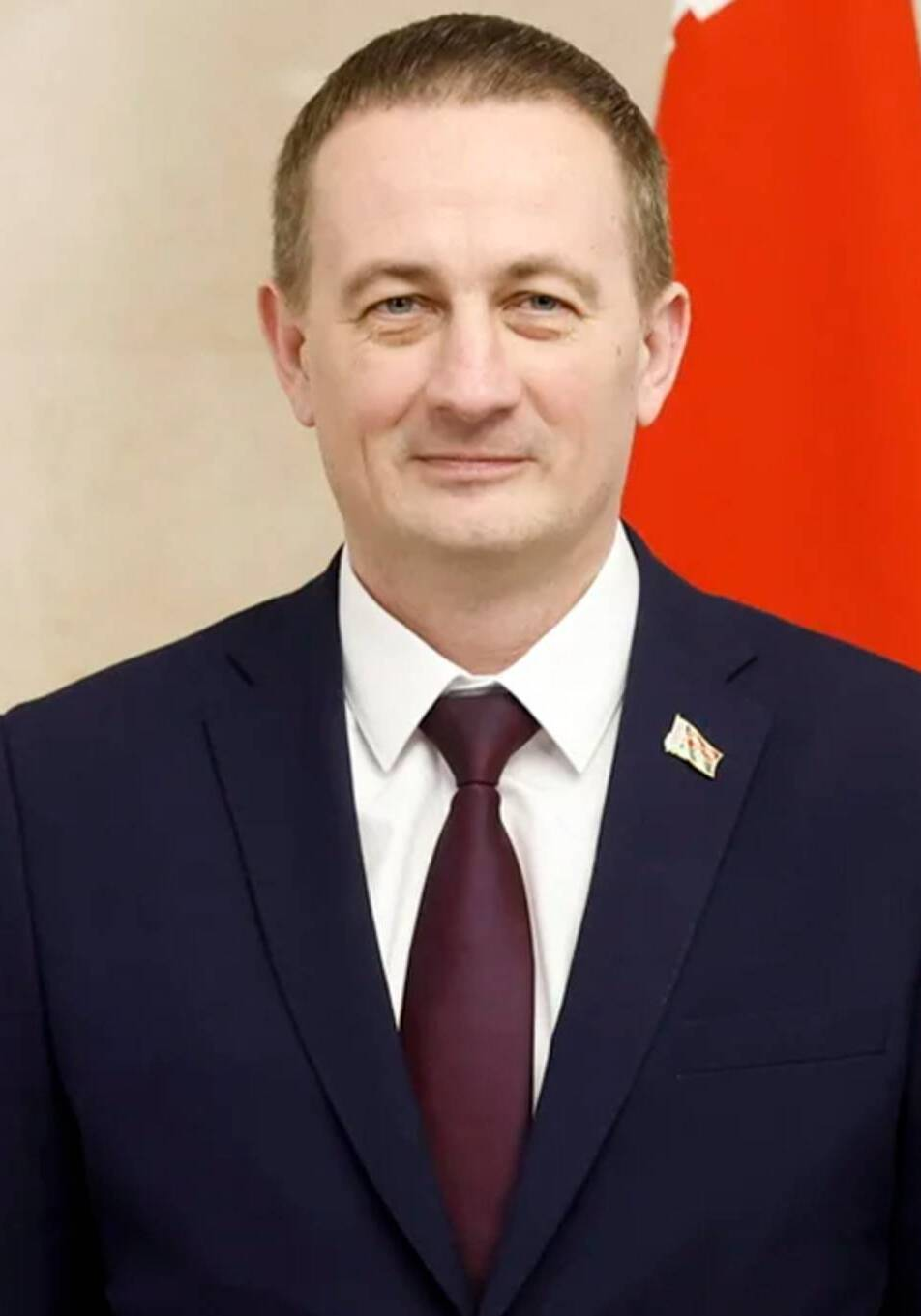
- Incumbent; Alexander Turchin since 10 March 2025
- Executive branch of the Government of Belarus; Council of Ministers of Belarus
- Style: Mr Prime Minister (informal); His Excellency (diplomatic)
- Type: Head of government
- Residence: Minsk
- Seat: Government House, Independence Square, Minsk
- Appointer: President
- Term length: No term limit
- Inaugural holder: Vyacheslav Kebich
- Formation: 19 September 1991; 34 years ago
- Deputy: First Deputy Prime Minister

The prime minister of the Republic of Belarus (Belarusian: Прэм’ер-міністaр Рэспублікі Беларусь, romanized: Prem’jer-ministar Respubliki Bielaruś; Russian: Премьер-министр Республики Беларусь) is the head of government of Belarus. Until 1991, it was known as the Chairman of the Council of Ministers of the Byelorussian Soviet Socialist Republic as the head of the government of the constituent republic of the Soviet Union.

The prime minister leads the Council of Ministers of Belarus, the central government body, and is accountable to the president. The prime minister is appointed by the president of Belarus. Once the prime minister is appointed they form a 30-member cabinet which consists of ministers and chairmen, the latter of which is a non-ministerial post. As Belarus is a dictatorship by president Lukashenko the prime minister has no real power or control over government affairs and it is ultimately under direct control of the president who has the real power over government and its activities.

== Duties ==
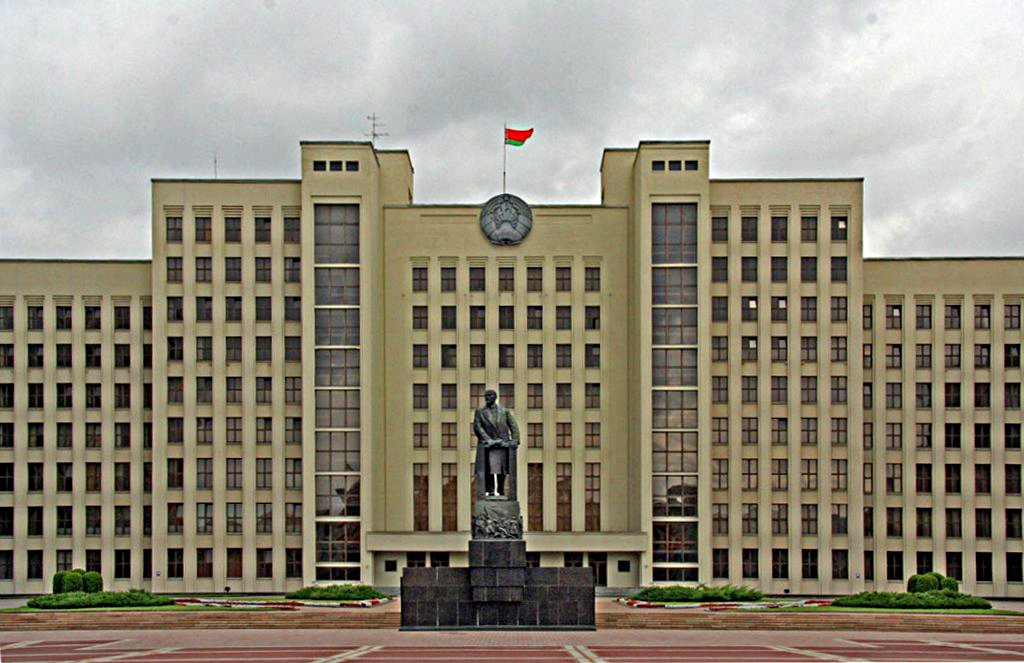
Government House in Minsk

The activities of the prime minister in managing the government include:

- Signing government legislation
- Inform the President on the basic guidelines of the government
- Draft budget
- Enforce a uniform financial, monetary, education, health care, and labour policy
- Ensure the implementation of decrees and instructions of the president
- To substitute for the president on temporary and absolute absences

The constitution was drafted by the Supreme Council of Belarus, the former legislative body of the country and is heavily influenced by Western constitutions. The constitution has been amended thrice under controversial circumstances since the original adoption, in 1996, in 2004 and in 2022. Two referendums that were disputed by independent observers and government opposition leaders increased the power of the presidency over the government and eliminated the term limits for the presidency.

== See also ==
- List of national leaders of Belarus
- President of Belarus
- List of prime ministers of Belarus
- National Assembly of Belarus
- Government of Belarus
- Supreme Soviet of Belarus, the preceding supreme state power in Belarus
