= Belarus–Latvia relations =

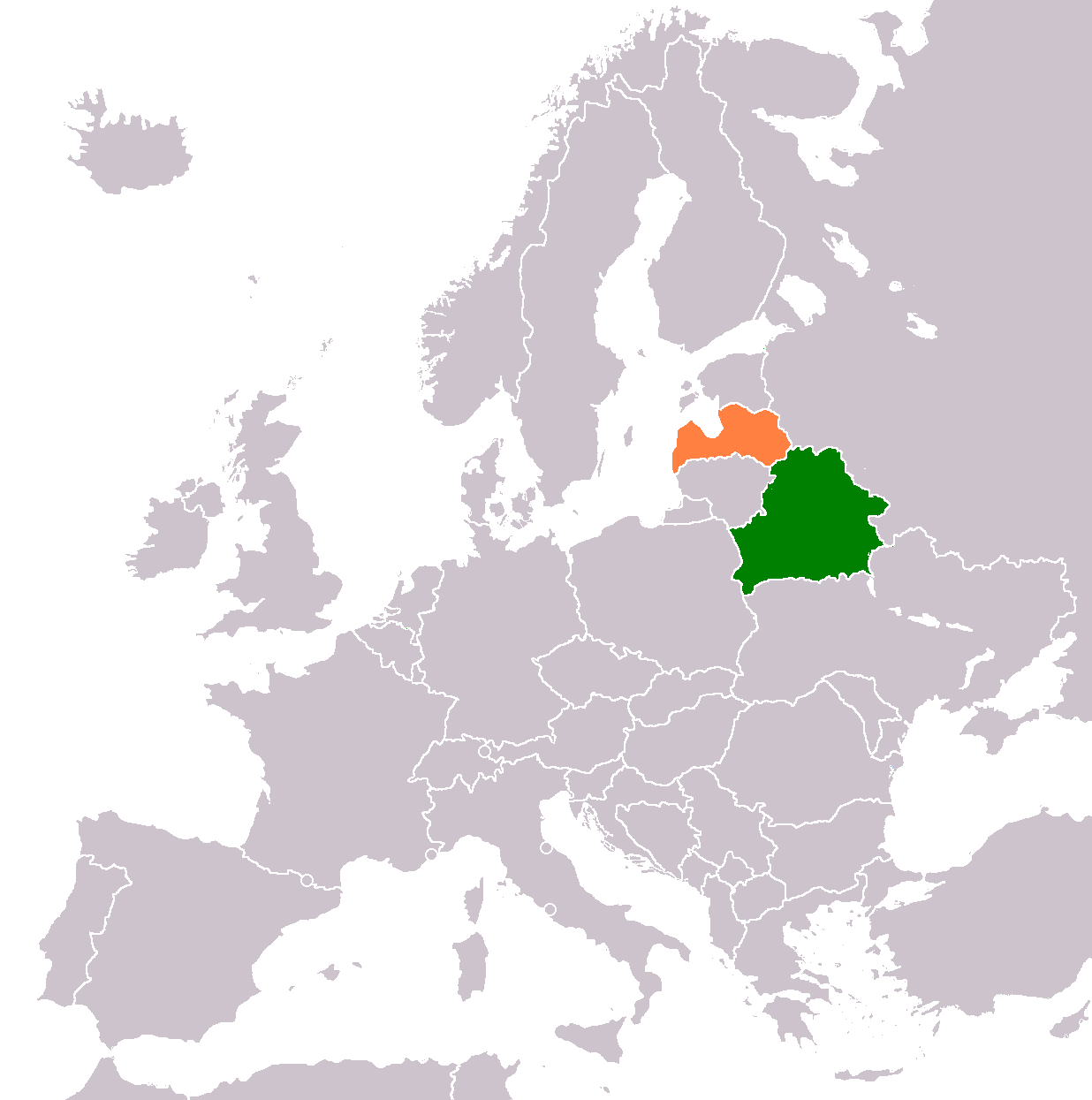

- Belarus: Latvia

Currently, Belarus has an embassy in Riga, while Latvia has an embassy in Minsk. The countries share 161 km as it relates to their common border.

== History ==
=== Pre-history ===
==== Prior to 1945 ====
After Latvia gained independence, several organizations for the Belarusian minority were established, however, after the 1934 Latvian coup d'état, and the German occupation of Latvia during World War II that followed a couple of years later, these organizations were eradicated.

==== Soviet era (1945–1990) ====
During the period where the two nations were part of the Soviet Union, Latvia saw an influx of migrants from Belarus. During Perestroika, new organizations for Belarusians in Latvia were established.

Flag of the Latvian Soviet Socialist Republic (1953–1991)

Flag of the Byelorussian Soviet Socialist Republic (1951–1990)

=== Modern era ===
The two countries signed a "Declaration on the Principles of Good-Neighborly Relations" on 16 December 1991 and established full bilateral relations on 7 April 1992. Embassies were opened in both countries in 1993 and consulates general the following year. The current border was established by an agreement on 21 February 1994, finalized on April 10, 2013. On 7 April 2016, Latvijas Televīzija and the National State Television and Radio Company of Belarus signed a cooperation agreement, which provided for the exchange of materials, as well as work on joint projects in the future. 60 twin city and partner agreements have been signed between Belarusian and Latvian regions.

The Latvian and Belarusian capitals are still due to host the 2021 IIHF World Championship, even in spite of the diplomatic rift of 2020.

==== Rifts in relations ====
Political conflicts began after Alexander Lukashenko came to power in 1994, when Latvian politicians expressed concern over his statements about rapprochement with Russia. In May 2001, Latvian Defense Minister Ģirts Valdis Kristovskis said in a radio interview that "Our probable enemy is objectively in the east" and that "Europe objectively believes that there is the last totalitarian regime in Europe". After the Belarusian Foreign Ministry declared a protest, Prime Minister Andris Berzins condemned the minister's statement.

The year 2004 saw a sharp deterioration in Latvian-Belarusian relations, set by President Vaira Vike-Freiberga, whose government encouraged personal efforts by U.S. Senator John McCain to restore democracy in Belarus. The Open Belarus organization was founded in Latvia during this time, calling on future Latvian MEPs to prioritize observance of freedom of speech in Belarus. In 2011, Latvia condemned the conviction of opposition leader Ales Bialiatski, calling on Belarus to ensure the observance of human rights and the holding of democratic elections, as well as to release political prisoners. Despite this action, the European Council on Foreign Relations in its 2013 report classified Latvia as a "sloth" among the nations of the European Union in calling for a more democratic Belarusian government. In 2012, the Belarusian government expressed indignation at the opening of the Monument to the Defenders of Bauska honoring the Latvian Legion of the Waffen-SS. The Foreign Ministry of Belarus called the erection of the monument a "clear desecration of the memory of the fallen", citing the fact that members of the legion were involved in the killings of Red Army personnel, Belarusian partisans and civilians. The following year, it included a chapter on Latvia in a government report entitled "Violations of human rights in certain countries of the world in 2012".

In 2020, protests in Belarus against the outcome of the presidential elections of 9 August 2020 occurred. On response, Latvia, as well as the governments of Lithuania and Estonia, were the first to declare Lukashaneko as the illegitimate leader Edgars Rinkēvičs, the Minister of Foreign Affairs of Latvia, declared the list of persons (including Lukashenko) who were banned from entering Latvia, supporting other individual sanctions against Belarusian officials responsible for the crackdown that followed the election. Latvia also condemned the post-election violence during meetings of the Nordic-Baltic Eight and the European Union.

In May 2021 the relations were de facto terminated as both countries were expelling each other's diplomats of the corresponding embassy, Latvia was insisting to use the former flag of Belarus, which is used by the Opposition against the Lukashenko Regime, as a representation for Belarus in the Ice Hockey World Championship in Riga over the Ryanair Flight 4978 diplomatic row. Belarusian Foreign Minister Vladimir Makei called Latvia's move 'an act of international vandalism' and called for an apology and return the legal green, red and white flag to its original place. The Belarusian government reacted with expelling every Latvian diplomat including the Ambassador inside the country, with Latvia following with the same response. The Zurich-based International Ice Hockey Federation sided with Belarus and asked the mayor of Riga to urgently take down the IIHF flags to protest to what the body called a political gesture.

==== Diplomatic exchanges ====
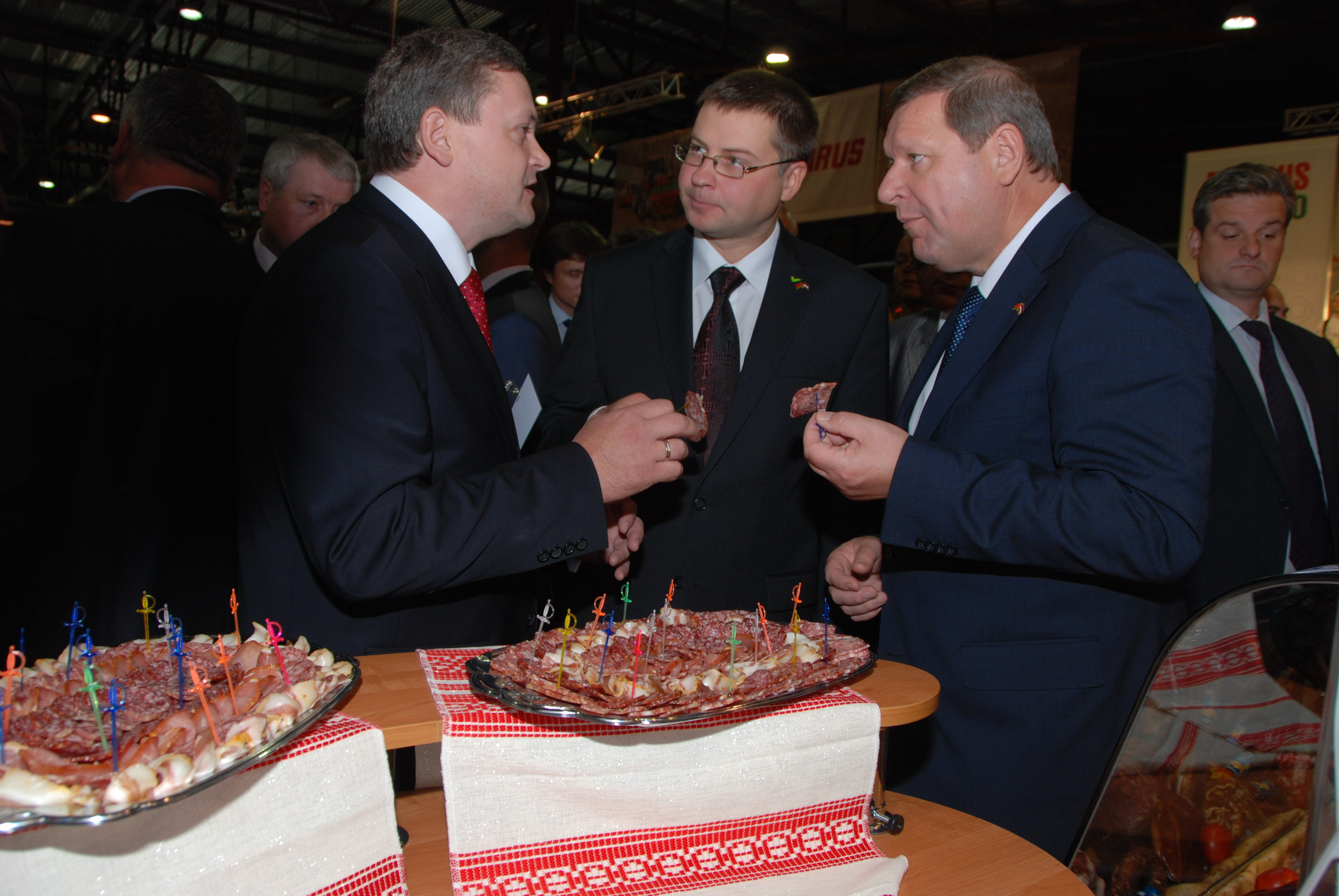
Latvian Prime Minister Valdis Dombrovskis and Prime Minister of Belarus Sergei Sidorsky view the exposition of the 8th Belarusian National Exhibition in 2010.

In general, there is only one case of a meeting of the heads of state of the two countries is known. This occurred on 5 September 1997 in Vilnius, when President Guntis Ulmanis met with President Alexander Lukashenko. In 2019, as part of the Latvia 100 celebrations in Minsk, Ulmanis visited Belarus and met Lukashneko, this time as the former president. During this visit, he reiterated calls by the Latvian leadership for Lukashenko to visit Riga. In 2020, the planned visit of Alexander Lukashenko to Riga was postponed (later cancelled) due to COVID-19 at the request of Latvian President Egils Levits during a phone call. The invitation was first made by Raimonds Vējonis in 2017.

Other officials of both countries (i.e. the heads of governments and foreign ministers) have met more frequently than the two presidents. On 11 July 2007, a historic meeting was held between Latvian Prime Minister Ivars Godmanis and his Belarusian counterpart Sergei Sidorsky in the forest on the Latvian-Belarusian border. This was due to sanctions being imposed on Belarus, which meant that Sidorsky could not enter any nation of the European Union. This meeting caused a stir among Belarusian activists, however represented a thaw in bilateral relations. In January 2020, Prime Minister Arturs Krišjānis Kariņš visited Minsk for talks with Lukashenko and Syarhey Rumas. In May 2016, Mayor of Riga Nils Ušakovs arrived in Minsk, where he opened the "Riga Corner" at the Komarovsky Market.

== Resident diplomatic missions ==
- Belarus has an embassy in Riga and a general consulate in Daugavpils.
- Latvia has an embassy in Minsk and a consulate in Vitebsk.

=== Ambassadors ===
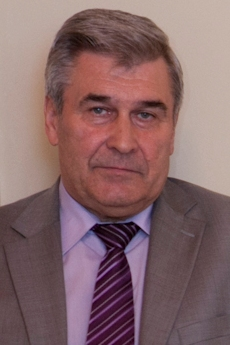
Alexander Gerasimenko (seen here) previously served as the first Mayor of Minsk.

- From Latvia to Belarus:
  - Agnis Tomass (1992)
  - Jānis Lovniks (1992–1993)
  - Ingrīda Levrense (1993–1997)
  - Egons Neimanis (1997–2000)
  - Maira Mora (2000–2004)
  - Mihails Popkovs (2004–2010)
  - Mārtiņš Virsis (2015–2019)
  - Einars Semanis (2019–)
- From Belarus to Latvia:
  - Valentin Velichko (1993–1997)
  - Mikhail Marynich (1999–2001)
  - Vadim Lamkov (2002–2005)
  - Alexander Gerasimenko (2006–2013)
  - Marina Dolgopolova (2013–2018)
  - Vasily Markovich (2018–2020)

== Diasporas and cross-culture ==
At the beginning of 2017, 3,034 citizens of Belarus lived in Latvia. In total, 69,298 ethnic Belarusians live in Latvia, making them the second largest national minority in the country (about 3.3% of the population). Since Perestroika, various organisations of the Belarusian diaspora have been created, the oldest one being Svitanak Belarusian: Сьвітанак, established in 1988. Following the wave of political refugees from Belarus after the brutal crackdown of the 2020–2021 Belarusian protests, another organisation, Supolka Belarusian: Суполка, was established.

The authoritarian regime of Alexander Lukashenko has also been facilitating the creation of loyal diaspora organisations since 1994, which culminated in 2005 with the establishment of the Union of Belarusians of Latvia (Russian: Союз белорусов Латвии; Latvian: Latvijas baltkrievu savienība), often abbreviated to SBL. In 2010, the union received gratitude from President of Latvia Valdis Zatlers. In 2017, members of the union organized jubilee celebrations in honor of the 950th anniversary of Minsk. Every year, the SBL organizes the Days of Belarusian Culture (Russian: Дни белорусской культуры) throughout Latvia. On this day, celebrations and festivals are organized throughout the country. In 2017, the Days of Belarusian Culture in Latvia were dedicated to the 135th anniversary of the births of Yakub Kolas and Yanka Kupala. The special guests of the celebrations were Pesniary, invited from Minsk.

=== Notable people ===
- Artur Karvatski, Latvian-born Belarusian handball player
- Otto Schmidt, Soviet scientist born in Belarus to a Latvian mother known for developing higher education and science in Soviet Russia.
- Kastus Jezavitau, Latvian-born Belarusian politician and defence minister of the Belarusian Democratic Republic.
- Boļeslavs Sloskāns, Latvian-born Belarusian Catholic bishop, supporter of the Belarusian language and the Belarusian diaspora in Western Europe and North America during the Cold War

== See also ==
- Foreign relations of Belarus
- Foreign relations of Latvia
- Belarus–EU relations
- Belarusians in Latvia
