= Leonid Erin =

Belarusian-Russian security official (born 1951)

Leonid Tikhonovich Erin
- Леони́д Ти́хонович Е́рин; Леанід Ціханавіч Ерын

Chairman of the State Security Committee of the Republic of Belarus
- In office 27 November 2000 – 18 November 2004
- President: Alexander Lukashenko
- Prime Minister: Vladimir Yermoshin; Gennady Novitsky; Sergei Sidorsky
- Preceded by: Vladimir Matskevich
- Succeeded by: Stepan Sukhorenko

Head of the State Security Service of the President of Belarus
- In office 25 September 2000 – 27 November 2000
- President: Alexander Lukashenko
- Prime Minister: Vladimir Yermoshin
- Preceded by: Uladzimir Navumau
- Succeeded by: Gennady Nevyglas

Personal details
- Born: 17 November 1951 (age 74) Orsha, Vitebsk region, Byelorussian SSR, Soviet Union (now Belarus)
- Education: Belarusian State University of Transport; Academy of Foreign Intelligence
- Occupation: Security official

Leonid Tikhonovich Erin (also transliterated as Leonid Yerin; Belarusian: Леанід Ціханавіч Ерын; born 17 November 1951) is a Belarusian-Russian security official. He previously served as Chairman of the State Security Committee of the Republic of Belarus (KGB) from 2000 to 2004, and was also briefly Head of the State Security Service of the President of Belarus in 2000. He currently works for Russian Railways, where he has worked for two decades.

Born in Orsha in the Byelorussian SSR, Erin graduated from the Belarusian Institute of Railway Engineers and began working as an engineer in Russia before joining the KGB of the BSSR in 1974. After the collapse of the Soviet Union, he began working in senior positions in the FSB of Russia, but returned to Belarus in 1995. In early 2000, he was appointed Head of the State Security Service to Alexander Lukashenko, before becoming Chairman of the KGB. Erin became well-known for making high-profile accusations of foreign interference in Belarus. He criticized the activities of the OSCE monitoring group in Minsk, and later attempted to exert more control over the KGB in the country. The KGB during his term was considered close to Russia, with him increasing cooperation between the FSB and the KGB.

However, in October 2004, after the first round of the parliamentary elections, a protest rally was held outside his office he let in opposition figures and talked with them. He was then replaced amid numerous theories by Stepan Sukhorenko. Afterwards, he moved back to Moscow and started working for Russian Railways as assistant to the CEO, and has since then continued as an adviser and on the board.

== Early life ==
Erin was born on 17 November 1951 in Orsha in the Vitebsk Region, which was then part of the Byelorussian SSR at the time of his birth. After graduating from the Belarusian Institute of Railway Engineers in 1973, he started working in the locomotive depot of the Sverdlovsk station. In 1974 he started working for the KGB of the BSSR. From 1975 to 1986 he then started working for the KGB in the Vitebsk region.

From 1982 to 1985 he was an employee of the Operational Group of the KGB in the Democratic Republic of Afghanistan, where he particularly worked in the Kaldar District. Afterwards, he returned to his previous position of being an employee of the KGB of the BSSR in the Vitebsk Region from 1985 to 1988. From 1989 to 1991 he then worked in the central office of the KGB, and after the collapse of the Soviet Union starting working in the FSB and headed the FSB in Moscow and for the entire Moscow region until 1995. However, he returned to Belarus in 1995. On 20 October 1995 he was appointed Deputy Chairman of the State Security Committee of the Republic of Belarus. In the early months of 2000 he was appointed Head of the Security Service to the president, a position he only did for a short while.

== Political career ==
=== Chairman of the KGB ===
On 27 November 2000, the press service of the presidential administration announced that the Chairman of the KGB, Vladimir Matskevich, was relieved from the post and placed at the disposal of the Chairman of the KGB. Matskevich was removed from the position alongside Aleh Bazhelko after they arrested the head of the special group within the Ministry of Internal Affairs, Dzmitry Paulichenka, after stating he was involved with the disappearance of prominent opposition figures. Lukashenko ended up getting him released, and the prosecutors, including Matskevich, were fired. Lukashenko replaced him later that day with Erin. In late 2001 he commented on the accusations of the government killing former Deputy Prime Minister Viktar Hanchar and businessman Anatol Krasouski after a videotape leaked where two supposedly senior officers of the KGB stated they were killed by a government death squad and showed the bodies, which he said was edited and dismissed.

In May 2002 he addressed the National Assembly, where he addressed the work of the OSCE monitoring group in the country. He stated there were positive aspects of the OSCE before 2000, but stated it came under strong pressure from the United States, alleging that it was a tool for reforms beneficial to the West. He directly accused the OSCE of trying to initiate a color revolution alongside foreign non-profit organizations. He also stated that the head of OSCE's office in Minsk, Ambassador Hans-Georg Wieck, was interfering in Belarus.

In October 2003 Erin stated that the KGB should exert more control over the internet in Belarus, stating that international terrorism and organized crime were on the rise. He stated that while it might be interpreted as a human rights violation, that state interests were more important. In December 2003 he announced a joint Belarusian-Russian agreement on exchange of information and research between the two country's secret services. By April 2004, with worsening Russian relations, Erin announced the seizure of Russian money that was allegedly sent to opposition figures to fight Lukashenko, and stated that the KGB would find out who financed the opposition, as it was prohibited. He also confirmed later that month that he would be detaining ex-minister and former ambassador Mikhail Marynich, who he said was charged with theft of official documents, but dismissed allegations that Marynich was one of the main recipients of Russian money to Belarusian opposition figures.

==== 2004 election and dismissal ====
During the 2004 Belarusian parliamentary election in October he stated that the Russian opposition was trying to interfere in Belarus, stating that Boris Nemtsov was in communication with the Belarusian opposition but denied that any color revolution would happen.

At 19:45 on 17 October, the day the first round of the elections happened, a massive number of people began to gather at Oktyabrskaya Square in Minsk, where they then moved to Independence Square and Skoryny Avenue, where the KGB building is located. After the coordinator of the "Free Belarus" coalition, Mikola Statkevich, addressed the rally, Erin came out. He refused to answer questions from participants and journalists about what happened to Yury Zacharanka, Hanchar, Krasouski, and Dzmitry Zavadski. After he was met by silence, he invited select people to take questions in his office about the Russian influence over the Belarusian KGB and the forceful disappearances.

He allowed head of the Young Front, Pavel Seviarynets, and journalists from Russian media and the Belarusian version of Radio Liberty (Radio Svaboda) in. There he rejected allegations about the large amount of influence of Russia over the Belarusian KGB, but still stated they would cooperate closely. He then reiterated claims that the Russian opposition and the West were indirectly trying to interfere with the elections and then gave the opposition figures a tour. He also promised he would not let anyone, including the government, infringe on their freedom and independence. After the meeting, he was sent on indefinite leave the next day and stated he was going on vacation. His duties as Chairman of the KGB were taken over by Stepan Sukhorenko. Other sources stated his resignation was because he instructed KGB officers to collect information on how voting was actually done, or that Erin was a possible candidate for the presidency supported by Russia. Seviarynets later stated he had a conversation with KGB officers, who stated there was an internal investigation going on within the board of KGB and that Sukharenko would take over as chairman. On 20 January 2005 Lukashenko officially appointed Sukhorenko as chairman.

== Russian Railways ==
In September 2005, it was confirmed through Radio Svaboda that Erin was working as an assistant to the head of the Russian Railways, Vladimir Yakunin, which was later confirmed by the company. In 2008, he became head of the Russian part of the organizing committee for the Russian and Indian Railways cooperation. By 2019, Erin, who was still with the company, was then head of the personal data protection department of Russian Railways. He was also a member of the board of the Transport Security Foundation. By 2022 he was still adviser to the general director, but also became Chairman of the Board of the Administrative Apparatus of Russian Railways.

== Personal life ==
As of 2005, Erin lives in Moscow for his work with Russian Railways. He also owns a house in Drazdy village by Viktor Kamenkov's residence, which is a village in Minsk that most associate of Lukashenko's live. In addition to Belarusian, he holds Russian citizenship, which he has had since the collapse of the Soviet Union.

== International sanctions ==
In November 2002 the Council of Ministers of the European Union announced that a list of officials, including Erin, was banned from entering 14 of the 15 countries in the European Union (excluding Portugal) after numerous threats against the OSCE in Minsk.

== Honours and awards ==
- (Russia) Order of Honour - for labor successes and years of conscientious work (14 November 2022)
