= Belarus–Taiwan relations =

- Belarus: Taiwan

Diplomatic mission
- None: None

Envoy
- None: None

Belarus–Taiwan relations (Chinese: 白俄羅斯—臺灣關係; Belarusian: Беларуска-тайванскія адносіны; Russian: Белорусско-тайваньские отношения) are bilateral relations between Belarus and Taiwan. The Taiwanese government once established a diplomatic mission in Minsk, but closed it in 2006. Belarusian affairs are processed through the Representative Office in Moscow.

== Diplomatic relations ==
Voting record of the UN during Resolution 2758 in 1971, which removed the membership of the Republic of China in exchange for the admission of the People's Republic of China. Soviet Belarus voted in favor of this resolution.

In 1992, Mayor of Minsk Alexander Gerasimenko visited Taiwan and met with former Taiwanese First Lady Chiang Fang-liang, who is of Belarusian descent.

Belarus played an important role in relations between Taiwan and the Commonwealth of Independent States. In January 1996, Taiwan and Belarus signed an agreement to co-operate on trade, science and technology, and culture. Then on 1 July, Taiwan established a Representative Office in Minsk, called the "Taipei Economic and Trade Mission in Minsk" (Chinese: 駐明斯克台北經濟貿易代表團). However, due to practical diplomatic considerations and inadequate functions, the office closed in January 2006. Officials from the Taiwanese foreign ministry later revealed that this decision was based on Belarus's opposition to Taiwan's entry into the United Nations and World Health Organization, along with rejecting the visas of Taiwanese officials.

In November 1999, representatives from the Belarusian parliament visited Taiwan, the first time they have done so.

In August 2001, the head of the Belarusian finance ministry visited Taiwan, and accepted a donation of $20,000 USD from Taiwan to handle the aftermath of the Chernobyl disaster.

Between 2002 and 2005, various Belarusian figures visited Taiwan, including Prime Minister Vladimir Yermoshin, head of Belarus Red Cross Romanovsky, and leader of the Liberal Democratic Party Sergei Gaidukevich.

On 10 May 2015, General Secretary of the Chinese Communist Party Xi Jinping visited Minsk, and the two sides signed a joint declaration where Belarus agrees to abide by the One China principle, opposes Taiwanese entry into international organizations for sovereign states, and agrees to not sell weaponry to Taiwan. In response, the Taiwanese foreign ministry criticized this decision, saying that it "demonstrates that Belarus signed a declaration against international reality and that harms the interests of the ROC in order to placate mainland China". On 11 May, the Mainland Affairs Council released a statement reiterating the fact that the Republic of China is a sovereign nation, and called on China and the international community to face the reality of two Chinas. The Taiwanese ambassador to Belarus also denied claims that Belarus and Taiwan had any arms trade.

On 6 May 2022, the Taiwanese foreign ministry strongly condemned Belarus for its involvement in the Russian invasion of Ukraine, and announced its participation in International sanctions against Belarus. This involves an export control system, where high-tech products may not be exported to Belarus or Russia without approval from the International Trade Administration or a delegated authority.

== Trade relations ==
Due to close Belarus–China relations, officials between Taiwan and Belarus are not enthusiastic about high-level exchanges, which also stunted economic relations between the two. Additionally, Belarus and Taiwan are both geographically and culturally distant, making business exchanges more difficult.

Recent bilateral trade volume (in USD)
Year	Trade volume			Taiwan→Belarus			Belarus→Taiwan		
Year	Amount	Annual change	Ranking	Amount	Annual change	Ranking	Amount	Annual change	Ranking
2017	55,625,205	▲33.4%	101	17,723,978	▲22.7%	112	37,901,227	▲39.1%	86
2018	31,875,437	▼42.7%	115	20,791,862	▲17.3%	110	11,083,575	▼70.8%	110
2019	43,266,125	▲35.7%	107	21,403,553	▲2.9%	106	21,862,572	▲97.3%	96
2020	50,740,029	▲17.3%	101	20,018,170	▼6.5%	108	30,721,859	▲40.5%	94
2021	28,622,512	▼43.6%	118	19,436,776	▼2.9%	107	9,185,736	▼70.1%	112
2022	44,492,212	▲55.4%	113	11,149,519	▼42.6%	121	33,342,693	▲263.0%	96
2023	39,425,475	▼11.4%	109	17,534,955	▲57.3%	113	21,890,520	▼34.3%	98
2024	54,835,664	▲39.1%	100	13,528,530	▼22.8%	118	41,307,134	▲88.7%	85

Taiwan → Belarus main trade products: Specific purpose machine parts; machines and tools with special functions; synthetic fiber yarns; machine tools, presses for metal or carbide processing; optical discs, magnetic tapes, solid-state storage, non-volatile memory, smart cards and other media for recording or audio recording; steel screws, bolts, nuts, spiral hooks, automotive screws, rivets, cross pins, R-pins, washers and similar articles; automotive parts and accessories; printing presses, offset printing cylinders and other printing components, as well as printers, copiers and fax machines; vehicle lights or signaling equipment for bicycles or motor vehicles; windshield wipers; defrosters or defoggers; interchangeable tools powered or unpowered hand tools or machine tools.

Belarus → Taiwan main trade products: Minerals or chemical fertilizers; parts for specific goods; integrated circuits; glass fiber and its products; hand saws, various saw blades; oscilloscopes, spectrum analyzers and other instruments and apparatus for measuring or checking electrical quantities; instruments and apparatus for measuring or detecting X-rays, alpha particles, beta particles, gamma rays, cosmic rays or other ionizing radiation; compound optical microscopes, including those for photomicrography or microscopy; fiberboard made of wood or other wood fibers; semiconductor devices, photosensitive semiconductor devices, light-emitting diodes (LEDs), pre-assembled piezoelectric crystals; mattress supports, bedding and similar furniture, etc.

== Investments ==
In October 2012, the Chinese International Economic Cooperation Association (CIECA) invited Belarusian entrepreneurs from Minsk to an academic conference.

In September 2014, the leadership of the Belarusian state-owned company "Svetlogorsk"（Belarusian: СветлогорскХимволокно) visited Taiwan, where they met with the Taiwan Textile Research Institute to discuss technical collaboration. In November, a similar meeting between the two was held in Belarus.

In June 2018, a Belarusian trade delegation under the Belarusian foreign ministry met with the Director of the National Center for Marketing and Price Research (NCMPS), which is responsible for trade promotion. The meeting handled matters relating to Belarus's accession to the World Trade Organization and also discussed business opportunities in Belarus and the rest of Central and Eastern Europe.

According to Taiwanese ministry of Economic Affairs, Taiwanese businesses had 12 investment projects in Belarus amounting to $29.43 million USD and Belarusian businesses had 139 investment projects in Taiwan amounting to US$13.31 million as of 2021. However, there are no organizations representing Taiwanese businesses or overseas Taiwanese in Belarus, nor are there any Taiwanese financial services in the country.

== Cultural relations ==
The president of the Belarusian Film Appreciation Association Savchik visited Taiwan in 2001–2002 to participate in the Taipei Golden Horse Film Festival and related activities.

The president of Belarusian State University Alyaksandr Kazulin once visited Taiwan, and the head of National Museum of History Huang Kuang-nan once visited Belarus. In May 1999, president of Belarusian State University Astapenko visited Taiwan to participate in an event organized by the Youth Development Administration.

In May 2003, the Chinese embassy in Belarus met with the Belarusian foreign ministry, where it requested that Belarus uphold the One China principle and forbid Taiwan from participating in the 14th International Biology Olympiad with a Taiwanese flag.

== Bilateral agreements ==
Bilateral agreements between Belarus and Taiwan
Date	Agreement	Notes
January 1996	《有關經濟貿易、科學技術及文化合作暨設立經濟貿易代表團議定書》 Protocol on Economic and Trade, Scientific and Technological and Cultural Cooperation and the Establishment of an Economic and Trade Delegation	
4 March 1998	《中華民國全國商業總會與白俄羅斯工商總會合作協議》 Cooperation Agreement between the National Chamber of Commerce of the Republic of China and the Belarusian Chamber of Commerce and Industry	(Note: Signed in Taipei between Wang You-theng (head of General Chamber of Commerce of the Republic of China) and his Belarusian counterpart to promote economic trade collaboration.)
2012	《中華民國國際經濟合作協會與白俄羅斯企業家聯盟協會合作備忘錄》 Memorandum of Understanding between the Republic of China International Economic Cooperation Association and the Belarusian Businessmen Union Association	(Note: The Republic of China International Economic Cooperation Association invited Vladimir Karyagin, President of the Belarusian Businessmen's Union Association, to visit Taiwan. During the visit, they jointly held a "Belarusian Economic and Trade Opportunities Seminar" and signed a memorandum of understanding.)

== See also ==
- List of diplomatic missions of Taiwan
- List of diplomatic missions of Belarus
