= Stepan Sukhorenko =

Belarusian politician and security official (born 1957)

Stepan Nikolaevich Sukhorenko
- Сцяпа́н Мікала́евіч Сухарэ́нка; Степан Николаевич Сухоренко
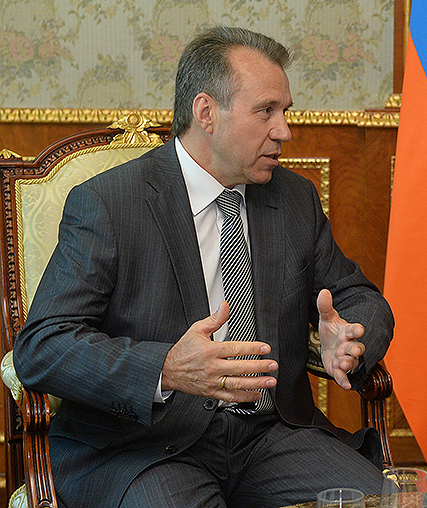
- Sukhorenko in 2015 in Armenia.

Chairman of the State Security Committee of the Republic of Belarus
- In office 20 January 2005 – 17 July 2007
- President: Alexander Lukashenko
- Prime Minister: Sergei Sidorsky
- Preceded by: Leonid Erin
- Succeeded by: Yuri Zhadobin

Ambassador of the Republic of Belarus to Armenia
- In office 14 August 2008 – 25 June 2015
- President: Alexander Lukashenko
- Prime Minister: Sergei Sidorsky; Mikhail Myasnikovich; Andrei Kobyakov
- Preceded by: Marina Dolgopolova
- Succeeded by: Igor Nazaruk

Personal details
- Born: 27 January 1957 (age 69) Zdudichi, Svyetlahorsk district, Byelorussian SSR, Soviet Union (now Belarus)
- Education: Belarusian State Technological University
- Occupation: Politician; Policeman
- Military career
- Rank: Major general

Stepan Nikolaevich Sukhorenko (also transliterated as Stsiapan Sukharenka; Belarusian: Сцяпа́н Мікала́евіч Сухарэ́нка; born 27 January 1957) is a Belarusian politician and security official. He previously served as Chairman of State Security Committee of the Republic of Belarus (KGB) from 2005 to 2007 and as Ambassador of the Republic of Belarus to Armenia from 2008 to 2015.

Born in Zdudichi, Sukhorenko first worked as a foreman then deputy head of the workshop of the Minsk Plant of the Минскстройматериалы (Minsk Construction Materials). In 1984 he entered the KGB of the BSSR, continuing to work there until the fall of the Soviet Union when he joined the Belarusian KGB. In 2000 he became First Deputy Chairman of the KGB, before becoming chairman in 2005.

His time as chairman was heavily overshadowed by the 2006 Belarusian presidential election and subsequent Jeans Revolution. Over the course of calls for protests, he stated that the Belarusian opposition had trained militants in Georgia, and that they planned to do a false flag and take over in a coup. He became known for a conference in which he showed evidence of a Georgian militant, who said they were planning to poison the water supply with dead rats, which became a meme and famous. After being dismissed in 2007, he became the Ambassador to Armenia in 2008. His time there was marked by a response to Azerbaijan's and Armenia's worsening relations, where he attempted to be neutral. Since then, his activity has been unknown.

== Early life ==
Sukhorenko was born on 27 January 1957 in Zdudichi (Svyetlahorsk district), which was part of the Byelorussian SSR at the time of his birth. He first studied at the Svetlogorsk Technical School No 50 in the Gomel region before attending the Belarusian State Technological University, where he graduated from in 1980. After graduating, he worked as a foreman, shift supervisor, and deputy head of the workshop of the Minsk Plant of the company Минскстройматериалы (Minsk Construction Materials).

In 1984 he entered into the forces of the KGB of the BSSR. He then entered the Academy of Higher Courses of the KGB of the USSR, where he graduated in 1985. After that, he worked for the KGB of the BSSR in the Minsk region from 1985 to 1989. In 1989 he was appointed deputy and then eventually head of the Barysaw city department in the Minsk region of the KGB of the BSSR, which after the fall of the Soviet Union simply became the Belarusian KGB. He then became an employee of the KGB Inspectorate of the Republic of Belarus in 1993, where he did for a year. From 1994 to 1997 he was an employee of the apparatus of the Security Council of the Republic of Belarus. During this time, in 1996, he graduated from the Academy of Public Administration in absentia.

On 5 November 1997 he was appointed Deputy Chairman of the Belarusian KGB. His position was to officially oversee the fight against organized crime and corruption. He then took on the position of head of the department of the KGB in Minsk and in the Minsk region from 25 August 1998. On 23 February 2000, when he was then a colonel, he was promoted to the rank of major general by presidential decree. On 17 October 2000 he was appointed First Deputy Chairman of the Belarusian KGB, which is the immediate successor to the chairman. It was alleged that during his time as First Deputy Chairman Sukhorenko was entrusted with the supervision of the candidates of the 2001 Belarusian presidential election, including anti-Lukashenko candidate Mikhail Marynich. In November 2001 he gained the nickname "Rybak" due him helping shut down the profitable Belvillesden company, which produced fresh-frozen fish for attempting to form a monopoly. During this time, he also supervised the arms trade of Belarus, although he was accused of conducting trade with countries such as Algeria, Angola, and Sudan during wars.

== Political career ==
=== Chairman of the KGB (2005-2007) ===
On 20 January 2005, President Alexander Lukashenko appointed Sukhorenko as Chairman of the State Security Committee of the Republic of Belarus (KGB), succeeding Leonid Erin. However, since the spring of 2004, Sukhorenko had been de facto the chairman and been the duties associated with the position because Yerin met with representatives of the opposition and because of hesitation about Yerin's loyalty to Belarus since he previously been part of the Federal Security Service in Russia and was associated with a conspiracy of Chekism.

==== 2006 elections and Jeans Revolution ====
In November 2005, he announced that adoption of amendments to the Criminal Code, which would increase responsibility for acts, would be introduced to stop protests ahead of the 2006 Belarusian presidential election. He stated that protestors were using their actions to exert external pressure and destabilize the country, which would result in a regime change. He also stated that the opposition had created several bases in Belarus to train militants to organize mass riots, including in Vileyka district and Krupki district. On 29 November, he elaborated and accused Western countries of wanting regime change via colored revolutions using NGO's, youth groups, the opposition, exchange programs, and broadcasting.

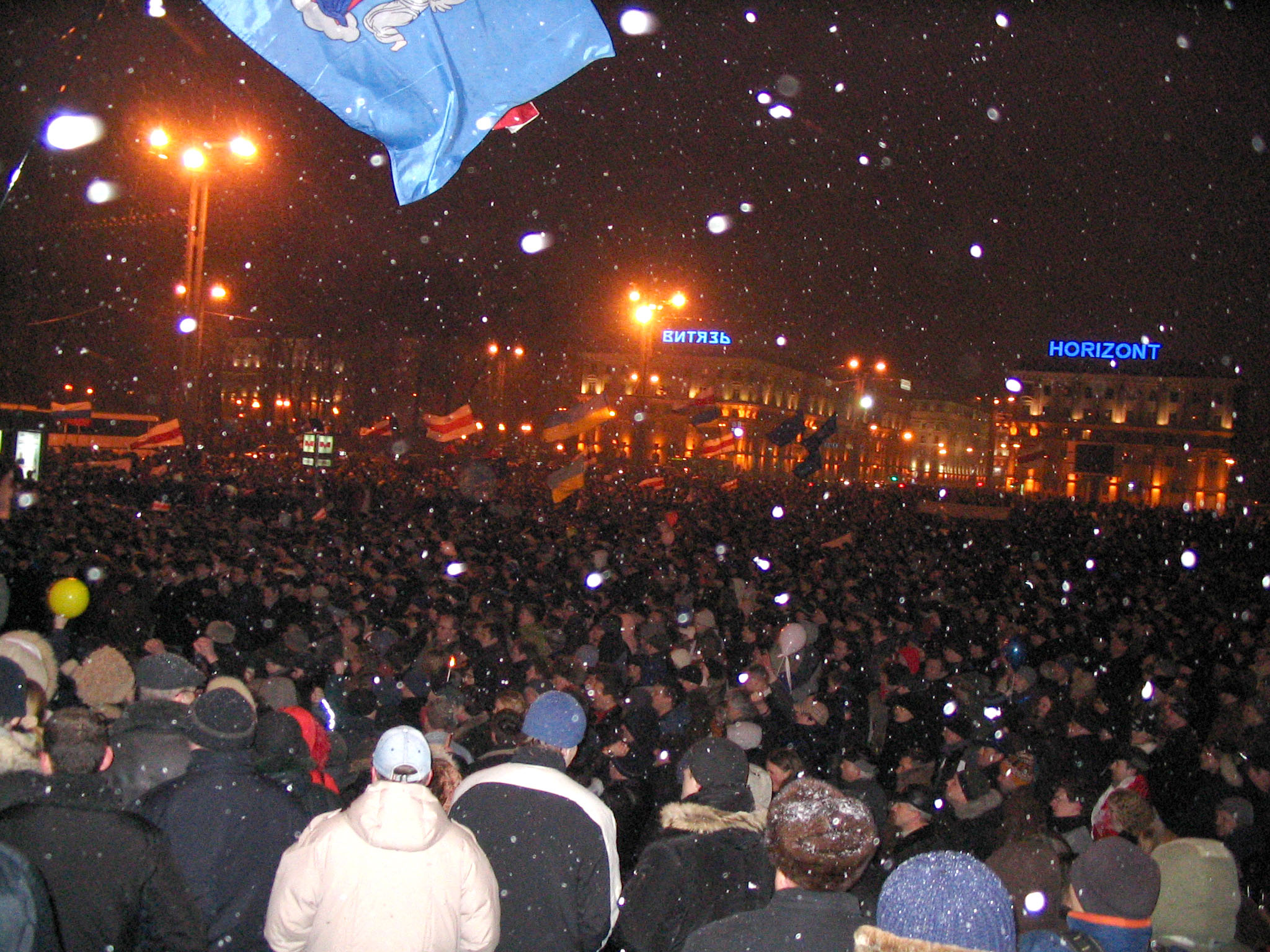
Sukhorenko alleged that during the Jeans Revolution a protest rally in Minsk (pictured here) an explosion would go off that was planted internally by the opposition.

In December 2005 a law was passed making to a criminal offense to "discredit" the Belarusian state, with Sukhorenko stating it was intended to stop a wave of protests like the Orange Revolution. On 1 March, the month of the election, he revealed the supposed opposition conspiracy by the opposition. He stated that after the announcements of the results of the election on March 19, the opposition would announce that the election was not true through parallel observations with false exit polls. They would then gather several thousand people in Minsk and detonate explosives, which would unit the protestors and they would seize government buildings and railway stations to stop the functions of the states using militants from Goergia, Ukraine, and from the countries of former Yugoslavia.

On 16 March, he stated that terrorist attacks were being prepared by the opposition for four schools in Minsk. He also elaborated that the militants were trained in a Georgian camp called "Kmara" under Arab teachers and former officers of the Soviet Army and that they were supervised by a colonel of the security service of the State Security Service of Georgia and Americans. They were also allegedly trained in hand-to-hand combat, chemical protection, explosives, and installation of tripwires. He also announced that anybody who showed up at protests would be treated as terrorists and would be detained.

A day later, Sukhorenko held a press conference where he claimed opposition activists were preparing bombings and arson, demonstrating newspapers, foreign currency, and opposition materials, but did not state how they were used. Furthermore, he presented an alleged activist who said they received training in Georgia on how to poison water supplies. During the conference, in the video's interrogation of the supposed terrorist, the person also stated that they would throw a dead rat or mouse into the water supply system, which would lead to mass poisoning. The statement would later become famous, as he was nicknamed the "rat catcher" by the opposition, and Belarusian opposition activists would repeat the statement for its "absurdity" and became a meme. After the election, on 22 March, the Minsk Prosecutor's Office brought charges against the organization "Partnership", after Sukhorenko's KGB detained the leaders in February for allegedly preparing a seizure of power under Article 193. The opposition said the evidence was planted by the KGB.

=== Post-revolution ===
On 17 July 2007, he was dismissed as Lukashenko stated he had "attempted to pursue his own interests in the economy", although Lukashenko later stated it was because he was transitioning to another position. At first, sources reported he was being sent to Pishchalauski Castle, and later to a pre-trial center on Valadarski Street. It was also suggested he was dismissed because of reports about the beating of the Chairman of the State Control Committee, Zianon Lomać, amid an alleged dispute between the KGB and the Ministry of Internal Affairs. However, Sukhorenko officially stated he was on vacation to his parents' home outside of Minsk with his family.

=== Ambassador to Armenia ===
On 14 August 2008, after his absence, he was appointed the Ambassador of Belarus to Armenia replacing Marina Dolgopolova. He also helped to organize the manufacturing of Belarusian agricultural machinery, a main product of Belarus, in Armenia for Armenian industrial enterprises and set up a center there for manufacturing. Vice versa, Armenia agreed to open up a bottling plant for cognacs in Belarus. In 2013 he got the two countries to sign an agreement on cooperation in the operation of nuclear power plants.

During the conflict between Azerbaijan and Armenia, he stated that Belarus has good relations with both countries and that the parties needed to look for a way to find a solution. However, he came into tension with the government of Armenia following a 2013 meeting where President Alexander Lukashenko stated that in order to accept Armenia into the Customs Union, Azerbaijan's opinion would be needed because of unresolved territorial issues. He responded by stating that Lukashenko's full speech helped clarify that the country was not against Armenia or its accession to the Customs Union. The relatively neutral attitude that Sukhorenko had towards Armenia was disapproved of by the government of Azerbaijan, particularly Edward Nalbandian, who said that Armenia did not need to be in the Customs Union and stated the government of Armenia was fractured. He also commented on the recognition of the Armenian Genocide, stating that Armenia had not made an official request to consider the resolution in the United Nations on the genocide, and if such a request is received then they would consider whether to recognize it.

In April 2015 he became Dean of the diplomatic corps in Armenia. On 25 July 2015 he was dismissed from the post. He was succeeded by Igor Nazaruk.

=== Post-ambassadorship ===
In 2017, he started working as head of the security and information protection department at the Development Bank but resigned the following summer in 2018. He joined the bank on the invitation of Sergei Rumas. What Sukhorenko has done since then is unknown.

== Personal life ==
In November 2018 he started renting a college in Drazdy for $3,500 a month. The cottage is 285 square meters, but officially belongs to Sukhorenko's daughter after he transferred the property to her during construction. He has a daughter, Tatyana, and a son named Andrei who is a representative of Belarus in the office of the Council of Europe in Strasbourg.

== Honours and awards ==
- Medal for Meritorious Service, II Degree (Belarus; 2000)
- Certificate of Merit of the National Assembly of the Republic of Belarus (2002)

== International sanctions ==
He is included on the Specially Designated Nationals and Blocked Persons List by the United States as someone strongly involved with the Belarusian regime. In addition, in 2007, U.S. President George W. Bush extended financial sanctions against Sukhorenko as a top official in Belarus, and approved arresting any bank accounts and property in the United States that he might have for undermining democratic processes. In 2011 he was also included on the European Union sanctions following the 2010 Belarusian presidential election and forceful reprisal against the subsequent 2010 Belarusian protests.
