= Anatoly Sivak =

Belarusian politician (born 1962)

- Анатоль Сівак
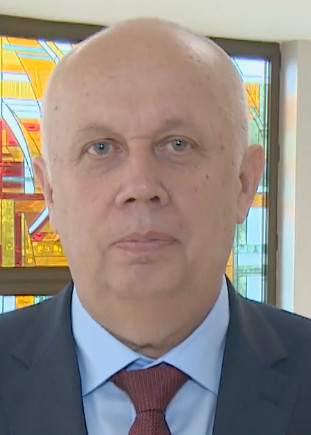
- Anatoly Sivak in 2020

Deputy Prime Minister of Belarus
- Incumbent
- Assumed office 3 September 2020
- President: Alexander Lukashenko
- Prime Minister: Roman Golovchenko
- Preceded by: Vladimir Kukharev

Mayor of Minsk
- In office 24 November 2018 – 3 September 2020
- Preceded by: Andrei Shorets
- Succeeded by: Vladimir Kukharev

Minister of Transport and Communications
- In office 31 July 2012 – 24 November 2018
- President: Alexander Lukashenko
- Prime Minister: Mikhail Myasnikovich; Andrei Kobyakov; Syarhey Rumas
- Preceded by: Ivan Shcherbo
- Succeeded by: Alexei Avramenko

Personal details
- Born: 19 July 1962 (age 64) Zavoit, Gomel region, Belarusian SSR, USSR
- Awards: Order of Honor

Anatoly Alexandrovich Sivak (Russian: Анатолий Александрович Сивак; born 19 July 1962) is a Belarusian politician serving as deputy prime minister since 2020. From 2018 to 2020, he served as mayor of Minsk. From 2012 to 2018, he served as Minister of Transport and Communications in the Government of Belarus.

== Early life and education ==
Anatoly Sivak was born on 19 July 1962 in Zavoit, Gomel region.
