= Aleksey Avramenko =

Belarusian politician (1977–2023)

- Аляксей Аўраменка
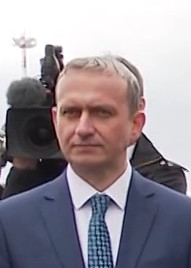
- Avramenko in 2019

Minister of Transport and Communications
- In office 15 January 2019 – 4 July 2023
- Preceded by: Anatoly Sivak
- Succeeded by: Alexei Lyakhnovich

Personal details
- Born: Aleksey Nikolaevich Avramenko; 11 May 1977 Minsk, Byelorussian SSR, USSR
- Died: 4 July 2023 (aged 46)
- Education: Belarusian National Technical University; Academy of Public Administration

Aleksey Nikolaevich Avramenko (Belarusian: Аляксей Мікалаевіч Аўраменка; 11 May 1977 – 4 July 2023) was a Belarusian politician who served as Minister of Transport and Communications from 2019 to 2023.

Avramenko was likely responsible for the 23 May 2021 Ryanair Flight 4978 being diverted to Minsk airport as it travelled from Greece to Lithuania, allowing journalist Roman Protasevich to be arrested in Belarus.

Following the Ryanair flight diversion, Avramenko was sanctioned by a number of countries. The diversion was considered a politically motivated decision aimed at arresting and detaining Pratasevich and his girlfriend Sofia Sapega and being a form of repression against civil society and democratic opposition in Belarus.

Avramenko died suddenly on 4 July 2023, at the age of 46, one of a number of suspicious Russia-related deaths since 2022.
