= Mikalay Ladutska =

- Мікалай Ладуцька
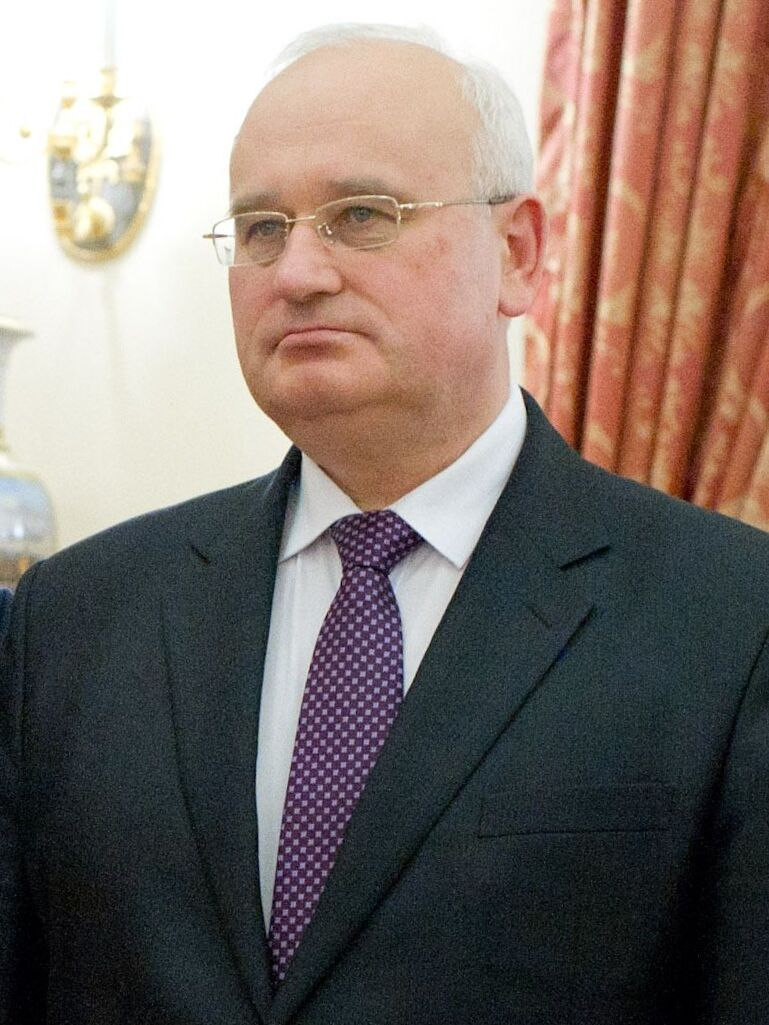
- Ladutska in November 2013

Mayor of Minsk
- In office 25 June 2010 – 6 November 2014
- Preceded by: Mikhail Pavlov
- Succeeded by: Andrei Shorets

Personal details
- Born: 21 March 1959 (age 67) Minsk, Soviet Union
- Education: Belarusian Polytechnic Institute

Mikalay Alyaksandravich Ladutska (Belarusian: Мікалай Аляксандравіч Ладуцька; Russian: Николай Александрович Ладутько; born on 21 March 1959), is a Belarusian politician who served as the Mayor of Minsk from 2010 to 2014.

== Early life and education ==
Mikalay Ladutska was born in Minsk on 21 March 1959.

Ladutska graduated from secondary school No. 40 in Minsk in 1976, and the Belarusian Polytechnic Institute (current BNTU) in 1981 with a degree in civil engineering (PGE).

== Career ==
He worked in construction and in the Komsomol movement. In 1990, he was the head of the production and technical department of SU No. 256 MPOID.

From 1997 to 2001, he was the Head of the Engineering Training Department, Head of the Production Department for Construction of MAPID "Minsk Zhilstroy".

In 2001, he was the Head of Construction Department No. 101 of JSC MAPID. From 2003 to 2006, he was the Director of the municipal unitary enterprise "UKS Minsk City Executive Committee". He participated in the construction of the new building of the National Library, and in 2006, he became the head of the administration of the Frunzensky district.

In 2007, he completed his education at the Academy of Management under the President of the Republic of Belarus. On 24 September, he was appointed deputy chairman of the Minsk City Executive Committee.

On 10 June 2009, Ladustska was appointed acting Mayor of Minsk in connection with the operation Mikhail Pavlov underwent. He officially took office a year later.

On 6 November 2014, he was dismissed by decree of Belarusian President, Alexander Lukashenko, and former Minister of Housing and Communal Services Andrei Shorets became the new chairman of the city.

On June 8, 2015, he was appointed general director of Motovelo OJSC after the arrest of the owners and management of the enterprise. During his leadership of the Minsk Motorcycle Plant, the latter was declared bankrupt (as of 2020, the liquidation of the enterprise continues).

On 15 June 2018, he was elected chairman of the Minsk Metropolitan Union of Entrepreneurs and Employers.

Since the end of 2022, he became the first deputy rector of the municipal construction unitary enterprise "Minsk Sadu".

=== Career as Mayor ===
In the summer of 2011, Ladutska fought the shortage of goods caused by the financial crisis in Belarus by firing the directors of stores where a shortage of goods was discovered on the shelves.

In the fall of 2011, he supported the idea of sending schoolchildren to “potato farming” during school hours, and in the spring of 2012, he ordered that students be involved in construction work due to the massive outflow of construction workers to work in Russia. On 12 September, Ladutko instructed to make travel on public transport free for full-time students. A month later, on 19 October, he announced his intention to double public transport fares by the end of 2011.

On 1 July 2012, free travel for pupils and students was abolished.

Ladutska was criticized by Alexander Lukashenko for his insufficiently attentive attitude towards foreign investors; low volumes of attracting foreign investment were blamed on him. Soon after this, the Minsk City Executive Committee began considering the possibility of demolishing the Moskovsky bus station (built in 1999 and receiving several architectural awards) to implement the Gazprom construction project (Gazprom Center), which received public outcry. Ladutko called the bus station of little demand and architecturally insignificant ("From the point of view of an architectural monument, the station is not like that. Therefore, it is impossible to say that the demolition of Moskovsky will be a big loss for the city’”).

In addition, the park named after. The 40th anniversary of the October Revolution, known for the Guerilla Parade held on its territory in 1944, was transferred free of charge to a Chinese company for the construction of the Beijing Hotel, which led to the cutting down of a significant number of trees.

Ladutska also actively defends the idea of densifying residential development in existing neighborhoods.
