= Vyacheslav Zarenkov =

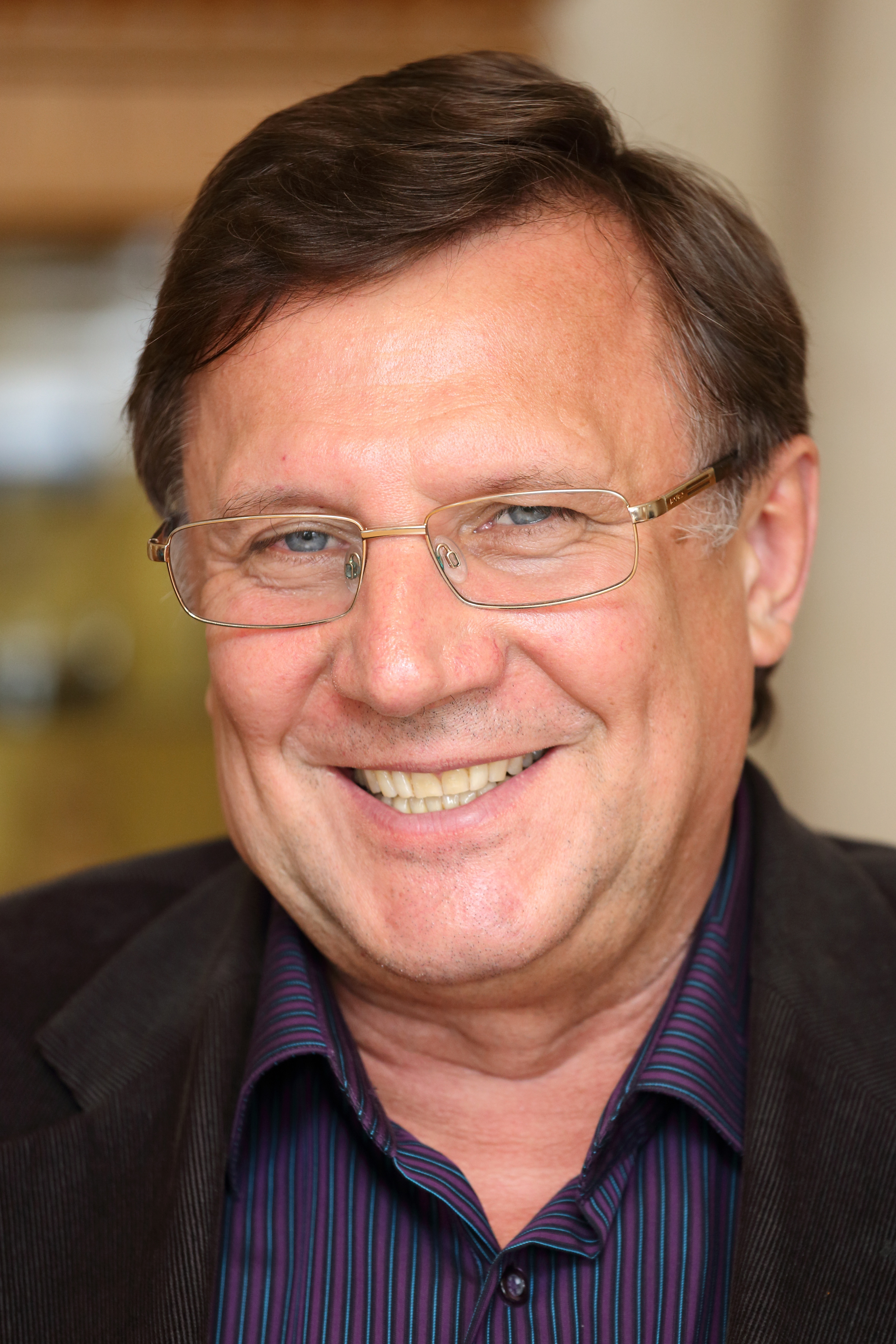
Vyacheslav Adamovich Zarenkov

Vyacheslav Adamovich Zarenkov (born March 28, 1951) is a Belarusian entrepreneur, best known for founding Etalon Group, a construction and development holding based in Saint Petersburg, Russia.

== Family and education ==
Zarenkov was born near the Belarusian city of Orsha, the son of a labourer and collective farmer. He arrived in Leningrad in the early seventies and after graduating from the Leningrad Civil Engineering Institute, joined the ‘Glavzapstroya’ building organization initially as a welder, eventually working his way up to a managerial position. He has a wife, Galina and a son, Dmitry.

== Career ==
=== Business ===
In 1987, Zarenkov set up LenspetsSMU, one of the first private companies in the newly formed Russian Federation. Since then, Etalon-LenspetsSMU has grown to become one of the largest operators in North West Russia. In 2001 he established Etalon Group of Companies on the basis of LenSpetsSMU (1987). From 2002 to 2007, he headed the Closed Joint-Stock Company Management Company Management Company Construction Holding Etalon-LenSpetsSMU. From 2007 to 2012, he was Chairman of the Board of Directors of Etalon-LenSpetsSMU Construction Holding. Since 2012 — President of Etalon Group. Since 20 April 2011, Etalon Group's GDRs have been traded on the main market of the London Stock Exchange. In 2017, Forbes ranked Zarenkov 177th among 200 richest businessmen in Russia, his fortune estimated $550 mln.

=== Art ===
Author of 13 academic texts to date, Vyacheslav Zarenkov is also the holder of 84 patents. He is the President of the International Fund for the Restoration of Historical and Cultural Monuments and engaged in numerous philanthropic activities including the trusteeship of schools and restoration of churches. His painting is also widely-exhibited and he is an active participant in the Saint Petersburg arts community.

In the spring of 2012, he founded the Foundation "Creating the World" («Созидающий мир»), an international social and cultural project that supports artists as well as the publication of books, plays and films, helps with the construction and restoration of churches and monuments.

== Honours ==
In 2007, Vyacheslav Adamovich Zarenkov was presented the award 'Honoured Builder of the Russian Federation' by Vladimir Putin in Moscow.
