= Andrei Shorets =

Belarusian politician (born 1973)

- Андрэй Шорац
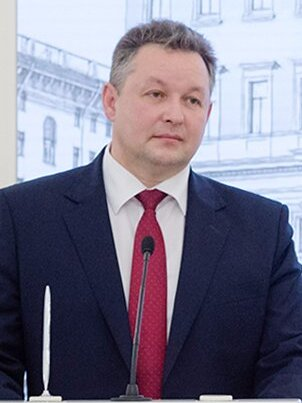
- Shorets in October 2017

Mayor of Minsk
- In office 25 June 2010 – 6 November 2014
- Preceded by: Mikhail Pavlov
- Succeeded by: Anatoly Sivak

Minister of Housing and Communal Services of Belarus
- In office 30 June 2011 – 6 November 2014
- Preceded by: Vladimir Belakhvostov
- Succeeded by: Alyaksandr Tserahay

Personal details
- Born: 12 April 1973 (age 52) Vitebsk, Belarus, Soviet Union
- Party: Independent

Andrei Viktorovich Shorets (Belarusian: Андрэй Віктаравіч Шорац; born on 12 April 1973), is a Belarusian politician who served as the chairman of the City Executive Committee of Minsk from 2014 to 2018. Before that, he was the Minister of Housing and Communal Services from 2011 to 2014.
