= Belavtodor =

Belarusian company

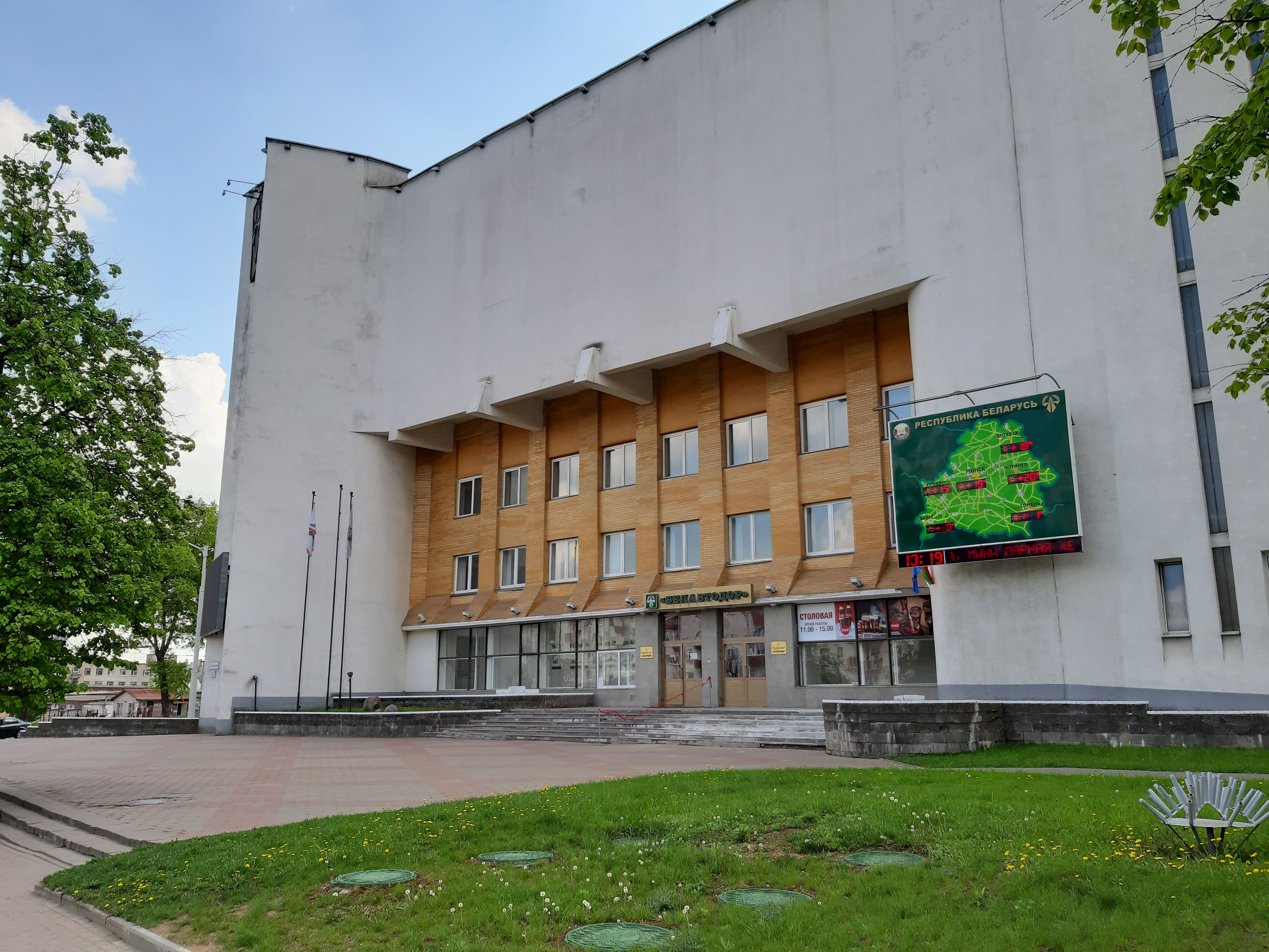
- Headquarters of Belavtodor in Minsk
- Company type: Government-owned corporation
- Industry: Road
- Founded: 24 September 2001
- Founder: Government of Belarus
- Headquarters: 37/1 Kalvaryskaya, Minsk, Belarus
- Key people: Aleksandr Minin
- Owner: State Property Committee of Belarus
- Website: belavtodor.by

Belavtodor holding (Belarusian: Холдынг «Белаўтадар»; Russian: Холдинг «Белавтодор») is a group of construction and industrial companies in Belarus, occupying a leading position in the market of complex construction, reconstruction and major repairs of transport infrastructure facilities. It also produces road construction equipment, road construction materials, reinforced concrete, steel and other products for the construction of roads and bridges. It is fully owned by the Government of Belarus through the State Property Committee of Belarus.

== History ==
In 2001, after the liquidation of the Committee for Automobile Roads of the Ministry of Transport and Communications, the Belavtodor Directorate was created. The main objectives of the company are the development and implementation of road policy aimed at rational development and improvement of the technical condition of the public road network, meeting the needs of the economy and the population for road services, and creating conditions for the development of road traffic.

In July 2013, the Belavtodor holding was created. The holding united companies in the field of road construction and transport.

In October 2015, the Belavtodor holding was transferred from the subordination of the Ministry of Transport and Communications to the subordination of the State Property Committee of Belarus.

In January 2017, OJSC Belavtodor Holding Management Company was created by transforming the Republican Unitary Enterprise Belavtodor Holding Management Company.

In 2020, Belavtodar became the first company with a state share in the authorized capital, whose shares were admitted to trading on the Belarusian Currency and Stock Exchange.
