= Alexei Lyakhnovich =

Belarusian politician (born 1977)

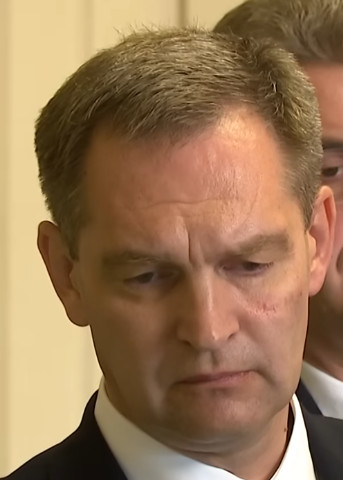
- Lyakhnovich in 2023

Minister of Transport and Communications
- Incumbent
- Assumed office 28 July 2023
- President: Alexander Lukashenko
- Prime Minister: Roman Golovchenko; Alexander Turchin
- Preceded by: Aleksey Avramenko

Personal details
- Born: 1977 (age 48–49)

Alexei Alexeevich Lyakhnovich (Russian: Алексей Алексеевич Ляхнович; born 1977) is a Belarusian politician serving as Minister of Transport and Communications in the Government of Belarus since 2023. From 2019 to 2023, he served as first deputy minister of transport and communications.
