= Belarusian State University of Transport =

Public university in Gomel, Belarus

Coordinates: 52°25′56″N 31°00′12″E

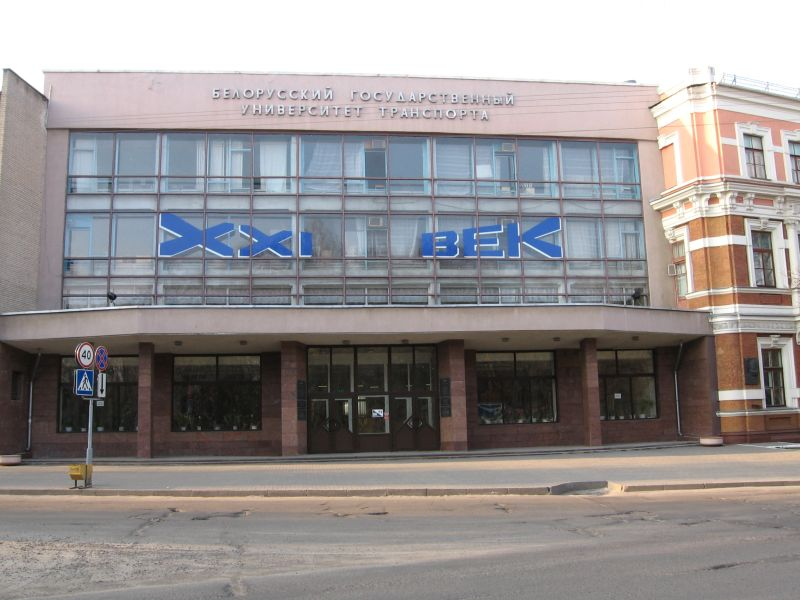
Building of the State University of Transport in Gomel, Belarus

Belarusian State University of Transport (BelSUT; Russian: Белорусский государственный университет транспорта) is a university and a non-profit public higher education institution in Gomel, Belarus. Founded in 1953, this institution has also branch campuses in Orsha and Brest. Until 1993, it was called Belarusian Institute of Railway Engineers. Officially accredited/recognized by the Ministry of Education of the Republic of Belarus, BelSUT is a coeducational higher education institution. It offers courses and programs leading to officially recognized higher education degrees such as bachelor degrees, master degrees, doctorate degrees in several areas of study. This HE institution does not have a selective admission policy. International students are welcome to apply for enrolment.
