= Vladimir Kukharev =

Belarusian politician (born 1972)

- Уладзімір Кухараў
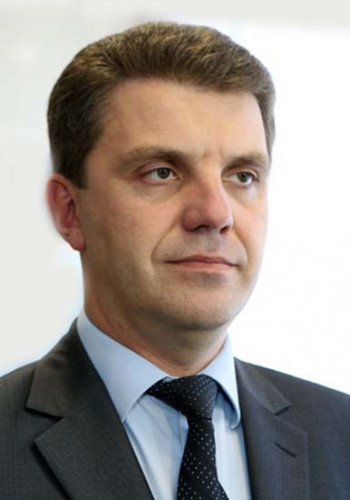
- Kukharev in 2024

Mayor of Minsk
- Incumbent
- Assumed office 3 September 2020
- Preceded by: Anatoly Sivak

Deputy Prime Minister
- In office 18 August 2018 – 3 September 2020
- President: Alexander Lukashenko
- Prime Minister: Syarhey Rumas; Roman Golovchenko
- Succeeded by: Anatoly Sivak

Personal details
- Born: 1972 (age 53–54) Timonovo, Klimavichy district, Byelorussian SSR, Soviet Union
- Education: Mogilev State University; Academy of Public Administration
- Awards: Order of the Fatherland

Vladimir Yevgenyevich Kukharev (Belarusian: Уладзімір Яўгенавіч Кухараў, romanized: Uladzimir Yawhenavich Kukharaw; Russian: Владимир Евгеньевич Кухарев; born 1972) is a Belarusian politician serving as mayor of Minsk since 2020. From 2018 to 2020, he served as deputy prime minister.
