= Mārtiņš Virsis =

Latvian diplomat

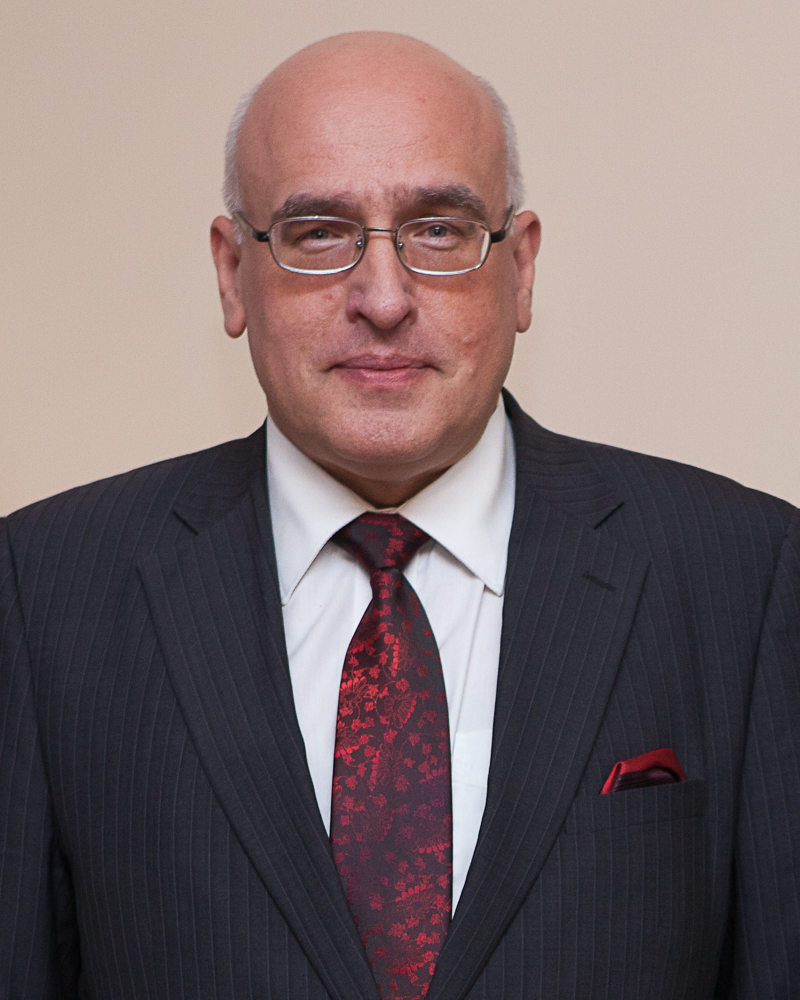
- Mārtiņš Virsis in 2011

Personal details
- Born: 26 February 1959 (age 67) Valmiera, LSSR, USSR (now Valmiera, Latvia)

Mārtiņš Virsis (born February 26, 1959, in Valmiera) is a Latvian historian, politician and diplomat. He was the member of the Fifth Saeima of Latvia (1993 to 1995) and the Latvian ambassador to Germany (2002 to 2008), Lithuania (2010 to 2015) and Belarus (October 5, 2015 to 2019). He is married and has two children.

== Career ==
He studied history in University of Latvia from 1977 to 1982, then he studied as an aspirant. In 1992 he obtained a doctorate in history.

From 1990 he worked in the Ministry of Foreign Affairs as the deputy minister. From 1993 to 1995 he was a member of the Fifth Saeima of Latvia from the Latvian Way party. In 1995 he became the ambassador of the Republic of Latvia to Austria and between 1996 and 2000 he acquired the position of being a non-resident ambassador of Latvia to Switzerland, Liechtenstein, Hungary, Slovenia and Slovakia.

From 2000 to 2002 he worked in the Latvian Ministry of Foreign Affairs 1st political directorarte as deputy state secretary. From 2002 to 2008 he was the Latvian ambassador to the Federal Republic of Germany. On November 2, 2004, he was appointed ambassador to Kuwait. In 2008 to 2010 he was the general inspector at the Latvian Ministry of Foreign Affairs. From 2010 to 2015 he was the Latvian ambassador to Lithuania. From 2015 to 2019 he was the Latvian ambassador to Belarus.

In 2007 he was awarded with the 2nd class Order of the Three Stars and in 2008 he was awarded with the Grand Cross of the Order of Merit of the Federal Republic of Germany.
