= Vasily Markovich =

Belarusian politician

- Васіль Міхайлавіч Марковіч
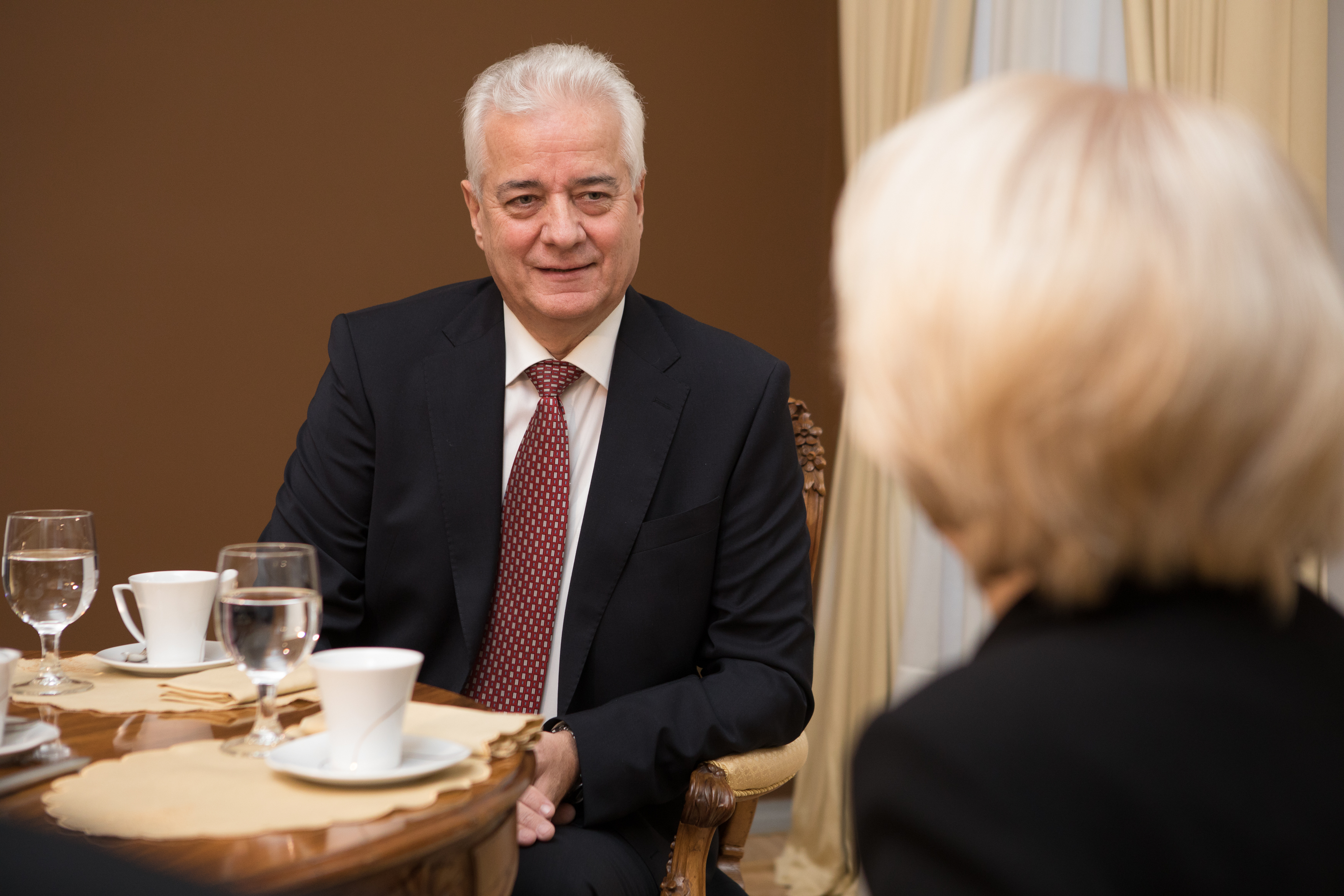
- Vasily Markovich in 2019

Personal details
- Born: 13 October 1955 (age 71) Kažan-Haradok, Brest Region, BSSR, USSR (now Kažan-Haradok, Belarus)

Vasily Markovich is a Belarusian politician and diplomat. He was born on 13 October 1955 in Belarus, Brest Region, Kažan-Haradok.

== Career ==
After graduating from the Faculty of Law of the Belarusian State University in 1981, from 1981 to 1991, he worked in the Chamber of Commerce and Industry of Belarus, from 1991 to 1992 he was the third secretary in the USSR embassy in France. In 1992, he also worked as the third secretary in the consultant department of the Belarusian Ministry of Foreign affairs as well as a secretary for the Belarusian ambassador in France from 1992 to 1995. He also worked in the consultant department of Belarusian Ministry of Foreign affairs as the deputy chief from 1995 to 1998.

From 1998 to 2002, he was the consul general in Daugavpils. From 2002 to 2006 he worked in the Belarusian Ministry of Foreign affairs as the head of protocol service, from 2006 to 2010 he worked as the counselor of the Belarusian embassy in Czech Republic. From 2010 to 2015, he was the Belarusian ambassador in Czech Republic. From 2015 to 2018 he was the head of the personnel department of the Ministry of Foreign affairs and from September 2018 to September 2020 he was the Belarusian ambassador in Latvia.

During the presidential elections, Markovich did not hide the fact that Svetlana Tsikhanovskaya won at the polling station in Riga. Vasily Markovich was dismissed from the post of ambassador and stripped of diplomatic rank shortly thereafter by order of Alexander Lukashenko with the wording "for improper performance of official duties".
