= Mikhail Pavlov (politician) =

Belarusian politician (1952–2010)

- Міхаіл Паўлаў; Михаил Павлов

Mayor of Minsk
- In office 28 March 2000 – 6 June 2010
- Preceded by: Vladimir Yermoshin
- Succeeded by: Mikalay Ladutska

Personal details
- Born: 1 September 1952 Ordats, Byelorussian SSR, Soviet Union (now Belarus)
- Died: 6 June 2010 (aged 57) Minsk, Belarus
- Children: 1

Mikhail Yakovlevich Pavlov (Note: Russian: Михаи́л Яковлевич Па́влов; Belarusian: Міхаі́л Я́каўлевіч Па́ўлаў, romanized: Mikhail Yakaulievich Paulau) (1 September 1952 – 6 June 2010) was a Belarusian politician who was mayor of Minsk from 2000 to 2010.

== Biography ==
Pavlov graduated from a secondary school in Mogilev, a Machine-Building Institute and the Russian Government-funded Academy of National Economy. He specialized as an engineer-technician for welding equipment and technologies, as well as a manager of higher qualification.

He began his working career as an electric welder in the Valozhyn region. After serving in the army, he functioned as general manager for several big machine-building enterprises in the city of Baranovichi for a decade. He was elected to the post of Mayor of Baranovichi in 1997. In 2000 and in 2004, he was further elected into the Council of the Republic of Belarus of the National Assembly of Belarus.

He was the Chairman of the Minsk City Executive Committee, making him the mayor of Minsk, from 28 March 2000 until his death.

He was married, and is survived by a daughter.
