= Orsha =

City in Vitebsk Region, Belarus

Orsha Орша
- City
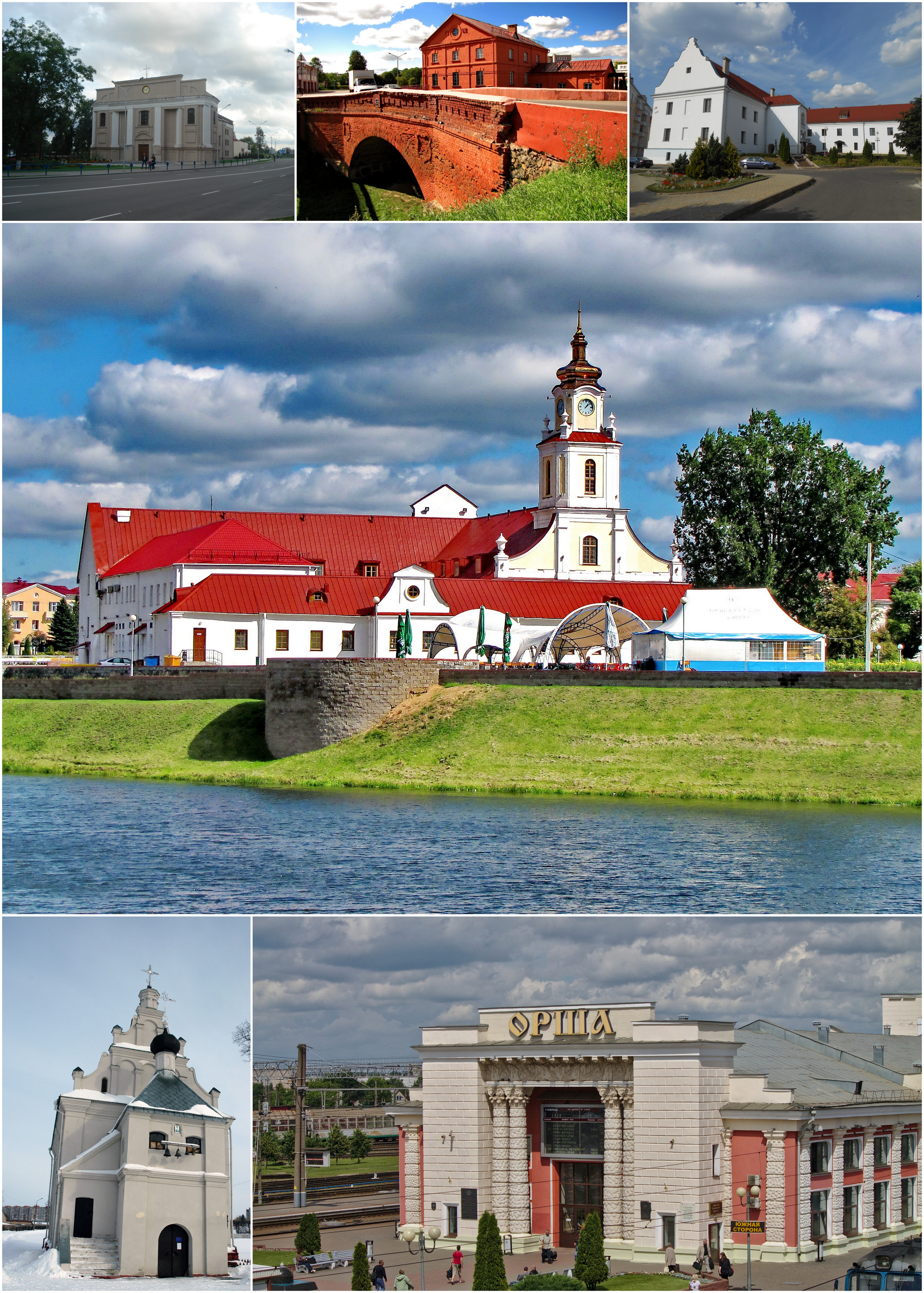
- Top: Orsha Saint Joseph Church, Mill Museum (Muzey Mlyn), Orsha Trinitarian Monastery, Center: The complex Jesuit Collegium of Orsha, Bottom: Orsha Holy Trinity Church, Orsha Centralnaja Railroad Station (all item from left to right)

- Flag Coat of arms

- Location within Belarus
- Coordinates: 54°30′33″N 30°25′33″E
- Country: Belarus
- Region: Vitebsk Region
- District: Orsha District
- First mentioned: 1067

Area
  - Total: 38.90 km^{2} (15.02 sq mi)
- Elevation: 192 m (630 ft)

Population (2025)
  - Total: 101,662
  - Density: 2,613/km^{2} (6,769/sq mi)
- Time zone: UTC+3 (MSK)
- Postal code: 211030, 211381 - 211394, 211396 - 211398
- Area code: +375 216
- License plate: 2
- Website: Official website

Orsha (Belarusian: Орша; Russian: Орша, IPA: [ˈorʂə]; Polish: Orsza) is a city in Vitebsk Region, Belarus. It is situated on the fork of the Dnieper River and Arshytsa River, and it serves as the administrative center of Orsha District. As of 2025, it has a population of 101,662.

== History ==
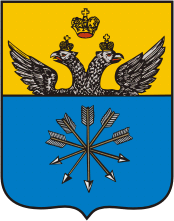
Coat of Arms, 1781

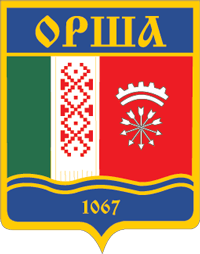
Coat of Arms, 1967, made for the 900th anniversary of the city

Orsha was first mentioned in 1067 as Rsha, making it one of the oldest towns in Belarus. The town was named after the river, which was originally also named Rsha, probably from a Baltic root *rus 'slowly flowing.'

In 1320, Orsha became a part of the Grand Duchy of Lithuania. Between 1398–1407, the Orsha castle was built. On 8 September 1514 the famous Battle of Orsha occurred, between allied Grand Duchy of Lithuania with Kingdom of Poland and Muscovite army. The Muscovites suffered significant defeat; however, the victorious Grand Duchy of Lithuania did not fully avail its victory.

In 1555, Mikołaj "the Black" Radziwiłł founded a Calvinist (Protestant) order in Orsha, one of the first in the Belarusian lands. From the sixteenth to eighteenth centuries Orsha was a notable religious centre, with dozens of Orthodox, Protestant and Catholic churches and orders. The town was also home to a large Jewish population.

Orsha was granted Magdeburg Rights in 1620. In 1630, Spiridon Sobol opened the first printing house at the Kuciejna monastery, which became a well-known centre of Cyrillic-alphabet publishing. The town was damaged during the Russo-Polish War (1654-1667), which was a disaster for the Grand Duchy of Lithuania. During the First Polish partition the city was taken over by the Russian Empire in 1772, and became part of the Mogilyov Gubernia. Under Russian rule, it was stripped of its Magdeburg Rights in 1776 and went into cultural and economic decline. The population dropped sharply to just about 2,000 inhabitants. The city symbol in 1781 was changed to one which included the symbol of the Russian Empire and five arrows.

In 1812, the city was badly burned during Napoleon's invasion. At the time that Orsha had been taken by French troops, there was a French writer Marie-Henri Beyle (also known under the pen name Stendhal) who held the rank of intendant.

According to the 1897 Russian census, on a total population of 13,161, about 7,000 are Jews.

During the First World War, the city was split in half between German and Russian forces. On 6 March 1918, the Germans took Orsha-Tavarnaya Station of the Riga-Orlov railway. Orsha-Central remained under the Red Army. From 2 February 1919, Orsha became a part of Gomel Governorate of Soviet Russia and then Vitebsk Governorate in 1920. After the formation of the Soviet Union, it was transferred to the Byelorussian SSR in 1924.

The population before World War II was about 37,000. The city was occupied by Germany on 16 July 1941. The occupiers founded several concentration camps in the city, where an estimated 19,000 people were killed. The city was liberated by the Red Army on the 26th of June 1944 as a part of Operation Bagration. The city was almost totally destroyed.

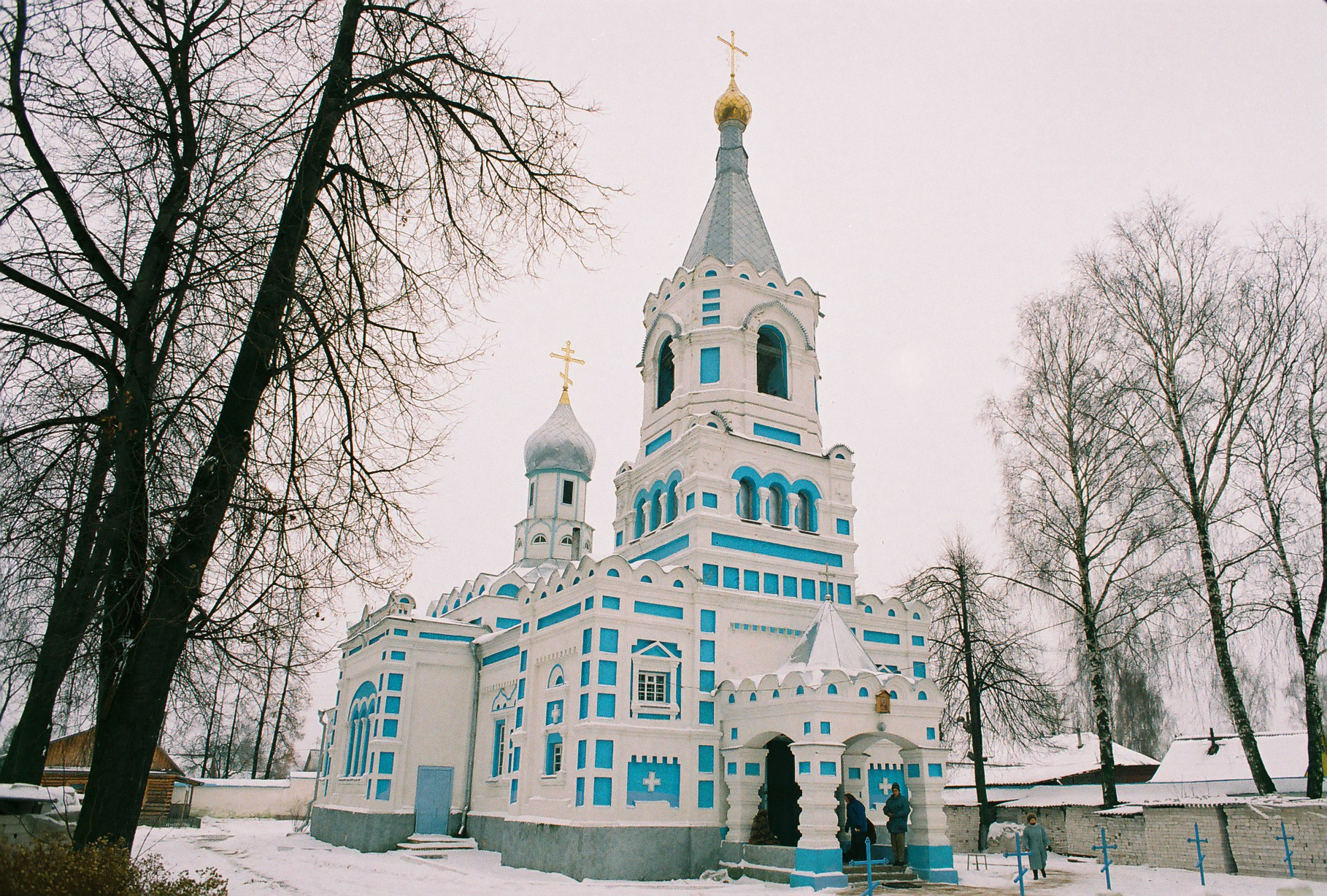
St. Elijah's Orthodox church

Orsha was one of the centers of the Belarusian strikes in April 1991. Hundreds of thousands of coal miners had been on strike across the Soviet Union since March 1. On April 3, the day after the central government had imposed consumer price increases, workers at several Minsk factories walked out raising the miners' demand for wages indexed to inflation. Virtually the entire labor force of that city followed on the 4th, joined soon thereafter by strikes across the Belarusian SSR. Mass demonstrations voted for additional demands (including the dissolution of the Union and Belarusian governments and the end of the Communist Party's privileges) and elected delegates from each enterprise to citywide strike committees, which in turn sent representatives to a central Belarusian Strike Committee (SKB). On April 23, the SKB resumed the general strike after the deadline for its demands to be met had passed. The next morning, Gorbachev, Yeltsin, and leaders of eight of the other Soviet republics published a joint declaration in the papers agreeing to democratic elections for the Soviet parliament and the presidency, a new union treaty that would "radically increase the role of the union republics," and measures to soften the impact of the price increase, but also the introduction of a "special work regime" in many industries.

In response, the Orsha strike committee issued a proposal for all local workers to block the railway junction, strategically located on the line linking Moscow and Leningrad to Eastern and Western Europe. This was quickly endorsed by votes to "lie down on the rails" at a citywide meeting at the railway station. On the 25th, the Belarusian authorities concentrated the republic's KGB and riot police forces on Orsha, but were resisted by the strikers who sent fuel trains primed to explode down the tracks. Gorbachev mobilized the nearby military forces in Pskov with instructions to restore order over the railway; however many officers declared their refusal to comply, and brigade commander Gennady Sidorov professed a "lack of understanding" of the mission. Meanwhile, workers in other cities throughout Belarus held rallies threatening to retaliate if a drop of blood was shed in Orsha. Fearing a clash, and seizing on the government's offer to negotiate with its representatives and grant it radio and air time, the SKB suspended the general strike that evening.

=== Sports ===
The bandy club Start has produced players for the Belarus national bandy team.

== Climate ==
Climate data for Orsha (1991–2020)
Month	Jan	Feb	Mar	Apr	May	Jun	Jul	Aug	Sep	Oct	Nov	Dec	Year
Record high °C (°F)	3.7 (38.7)	4.2 (39.6)	11.0 (51.8)	21.9 (71.4)	26.7 (80.1)	28.8 (83.8)	30.4 (86.7)	30.5 (86.9)	25.3 (77.5)	18.2 (64.8)	9.9 (49.8)	5.2 (41.4)	30.5 (86.9)
Mean daily maximum °C (°F)	−2.8 (27.0)	−2.1 (28.2)	3.3 (37.9)	12.1 (53.8)	18.5 (65.3)	22.1 (71.8)	24.1 (75.4)	23.1 (73.6)	17.1 (62.8)	9.8 (49.6)	2.7 (36.9)	−1.4 (29.5)	10.5 (50.9)
Daily mean °C (°F)	−5.0 (23.0)	−4.8 (23.4)	−0.3 (31.5)	7.0 (44.6)	13.0 (55.4)	16.7 (62.1)	18.7 (65.7)	17.5 (63.5)	12.1 (53.8)	6.2 (43.2)	0.7 (33.3)	−3.3 (26.1)	6.5 (43.7)
Mean daily minimum °C (°F)	−7.7 (18.1)	−7.9 (17.8)	−3.9 (25.0)	2.1 (35.8)	7.2 (45.0)	10.9 (51.6)	12.9 (55.2)	11.9 (53.4)	7.4 (45.3)	2.9 (37.2)	−1.5 (29.3)	−5.6 (21.9)	2.4 (36.3)
Record low °C (°F)	−22.6 (−8.7)	−20.6 (−5.1)	−13.5 (7.7)	−4.4 (24.1)	−0.2 (31.6)	3.8 (38.8)	7.4 (45.3)	5.1 (41.2)	−0.1 (31.8)	−5.5 (22.1)	−11.5 (11.3)	−16.4 (2.5)	−22.6 (−8.7)
Average precipitation mm (inches)	38.6 (1.52)	35.6 (1.40)	35.4 (1.39)	38.8 (1.53)	68.4 (2.69)	73.9 (2.91)	81.7 (3.22)	72.6 (2.86)	57.3 (2.26)	59.1 (2.33)	45.9 (1.81)	40.3 (1.59)	647.6 (25.50)
Average precipitation days (≥ 1.0 mm)	11.0	9.4	9.0	7.2	9.9	9.8	10.2	9.4	8.2	10.0	10.1	10.9	115.1
Source: NOAA

== Transportation ==
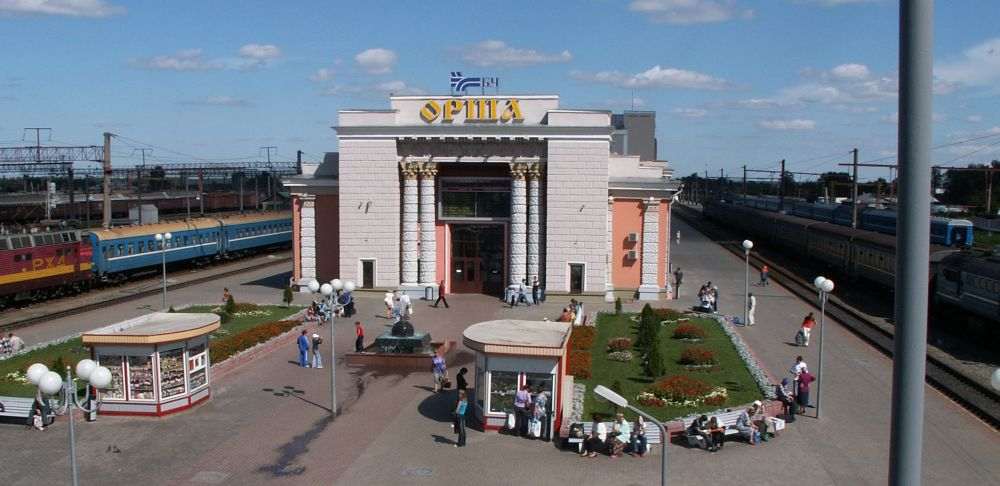
Railway station.

Orsha became an important transportation center after the construction of a Dnieper River port. The coming of railway lines in the second half of the nineteenth century greatly contributed to the city growth:

- 1871: Moscow–Minsk–Brest
- 1902: Zhlobin–Mogilev–Vitebsk
- 1923: Orsha-Krychaw
- 1927: Orsha-Lepel

Today, Orsha is a major railway node where the Minsk–Moscow crosses the northern Vitebsk line, which branches south to Mogilev and Krychaw. All trains from Moscow and Saint-Petersburg bound for Western Europe pass through Orsha.

The city is also a junction of the important motorways: The M1 (E30) Moscow-Brest and the M8/M20 (E95) Saint Petersburg - Odessa.

== Military ==
OSGOEINT reported on the 571st Aircraft Repair Plant (ARP) located at Orsha Airfield (Balbasovo Air Base). Accordingly, the 571st ARP repairs Mi-8-17 HIP, Mi-24-35 HIND, as well as the Tu-134 CRUSTY and possibly the IL-76 CANDID. The report goes on to mention recent investment agreements with Ukraine where private firms planned on providing $12 million to finance facility upgrades during the 2012-2016 period. Press reporting stated that the investors planned on building a modern warehouse terminal as well as office buildings for customs services, banking, and a leasing company.

== Attractions ==
- The Ethnographic Museum is located in the city center, on a man-made canal connecting the Orshitsa and Dnieper rivers. The watermill was built at the beginning of the last century. For a long time, it was the largest in the Orsha district. In the early 1990s, the historic building, which had been granted the status of a monument of industrial architecture, was restored, and in 1995, an ethnographic museum was established there.
- Memorial Complex “For Our Soviet Motherland” (“Katyusha”). In July 1941, the Katyusha multiple rocket launcher was used for the first time near Orsha, which made the city famous in the pages of military history. The memorial dedicated to Katyusha was opened in 1966, when Orsha celebrated the 25th anniversary of the first shot fired by the combat vehicle.
- Epiphany Kutinsky Monastery. It was founded in 1623. Initially, it consisted of wooden buildings, including the Epiphany Cathedral and the Holy Spirit Church (Troitsky after 1762), small churches, monastic cells, and farm buildings. The reconstruction of the complex from wood to stone began in 1891. The first building to be reconstructed was the Epiphany Cathedral, which had been almost completely destroyed by lightning. Gradually, all the ancient buildings of the monastery were replaced with new structures made of white stone. In the 1970s, the Epiphany Kutinsky Monastery was granted the status of a historical monument. At the same time, restoration work began on the territory, which was sometimes suspended and sometimes resumed. The restoration of the temple complex was completed in 2017, when the bell tower, which had been blown up in 1944, was raised from the ruins.
- Vladimir Korotkevich Museum. The museum, dedicated to the life and work of Korotkevich, opened in 2000. The grand opening ceremony was timed to coincide with the writer's 70th birthday. Interestingly, the exhibition is located in the former maternity hospital where Korotkevich was born.
- The Jesuit College building. One of the oldest stone structures in Orsha. The foundation of the college was laid at the end of the 17th century, but the architectural work was not completed until 1803. Initially, in addition to the college, the architectural ensemble included a church, a theater, a school, and a pharmacy, but all these buildings were destroyed during the Soviet era.
- St. Elijah's Church. It was built in 1842 on the site of an ancient temple founded by Polish King Kazimir in the 1460s. In the mid-19th century, a warm church was built on its territory in honor of Princess Sophia Yurievna. The wooden buildings existed until 1894. A large fire, caused by children playing, destroyed both buildings. Immediately after the tragedy, fundraising began for the construction of a stone church, which was erected in 1898 and has survived to this day.
- Church of the Nativity of the Virgin Mary. The predecessor of the modern Church of the Nativity of the Virgin Mary was built at the end of the 17th century on the city market square. In the 1960s, the old church and the adjacent bell tower were demolished, and a park was laid out on the vacated site. In 1987, the church's foundation was discovered, which served as an impetus for its restoration.

== Notable people ==
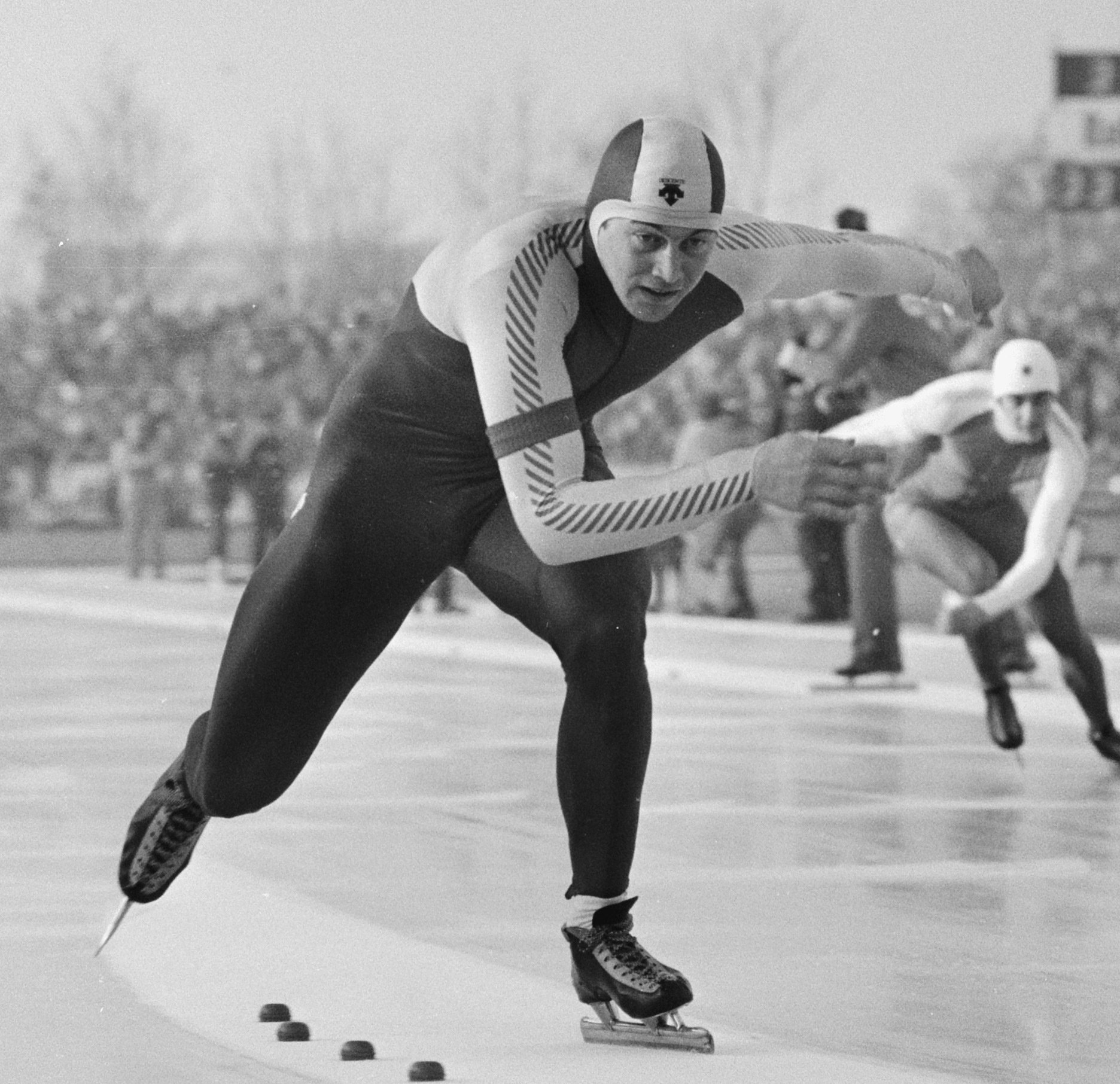
Igor Zhelezovski

- Francis Dzierozynski, Jesuit
- Piotra Holub (Golub Petr Semionovich) (1913–1953), artist, author of many well-known Soviet propaganda posters, such as "Болтун находка для шпиона" and many others
- Uladzimir Karatkievich, Belarusian writer
- Mikhail Marynich, opposition politician, who was imprisoned in Orsha
- Georgy Mondzolevsky, 2-time Olympic volleyball champion
- Gershon Shufman, Hebrew author, known as 'Gimel Shufman'
- Frida Vigdorova, Soviet writer and journalist, famous for writing "White book" after Joseph Brodsky trial, in support of human rights in USSR (ru:Вигдорова, Фрида Абрамовна)
- Lev Vygotsky (1896–1934), psychologist
- Nathan Zarkhi (1900–1935), Soviet playwright and film writer
- Faina Chiang, became first lady of the Republic of China in 1978.
- Igor Zhelezovsky, Olympic medalist speed skater
- Alina Talay (born 1989), track and field athlete
- Vyacheslav Zarenkov (born 1951), Belarusian entrepreneur

== Twin towns – sister cities ==
Orsha is twinned with:

- Asha, Russia
- Bălți, Moldova
- Bondeno, Italy
- Cherkasy, Ukraine
- Dubna, Russia
- Gagarin, Russia
- Ivanovo, Russia
- Ivanteyevka, Russia
- Kardymovsky District, Russia
- Koptevo (Moscow), Russia
- Krasnogvardeysky (Saint Petersburg), Russia
- Mārupe, Latvia
- Pernik, Bulgaria
- Pushkin, Russia
- Qingdao, China
- Shishou, China
- Silifke, Turkey
- Smolensk, Russia
- Spitak, Armenia
- Telšiai, Lithuania
- Tver, Russia
- Vaulx-en-Velin, France
- Volgodonsk, Russia
- Vyazma, Russia
- Yiwu, China
- Zapadnoye Degunino (Moscow), Russia
