= Mayor of Minsk =

Chief executive of Minsk, Belarus

Chairman of the Minsk City Executive Committee
- Старшыня Мінскага гарадскога выканаўчага камітэта (Belarusian); Председатель Минского городского исполнительного комитета (Russian)
- Coat of arms of Minsk
- Incumbent; Vladimir Kukharev since 3 September 2020
- Residence: 8 Independence Avenue, Minsk
- Appointer: Presidential appointment
- Inaugural holder: Ivan Chodkiewicz
- Formation: 1496; March 1917
- Website: minsk.gov.be (Archived)

The Mayor of Minsk, (Note: Belarusian: Кіраўнік Мінска, romanized: Kiraunik Minska; Russian: Глава Минска, romanized: Glava Minska) officially the Chairman of the Minsk City Executive Committee (Note: Belarusian: Старшыня Мінскага гарадскога выканаўчага камітэта, romanized: Starshynia Minskaha haradskoha vykanauchaha kamiteta; Russian: Председател Минского городского исполнительного комитета, romanized: Predsedatel Minskogo gorodskogo ispolnitelnogo komiteta) is the chief executive of the city of Minsk, the capital of Belarus. The mayor of Minsk is appointed by the President of Belarus, and has existed in its current form since the Russian Revolution of 1917 established the Minsk Urban Executive Committee in the city. Previously, Minsk was self-governing from the granting of Magdeburg rights in 1496 until its integration into the Russian Empire.

== List of mayors (since 1917) ==
=== 1917–1941 ===
- Boris Pozern (1917)
- Isidor Lyubimov (1917)
- Kārlis Landers (1917)
- Viktar Yarkin (1918–1919)
- Kazimierz Cichowski (1919)
- Fritz Küsse (1920–1921)
- Adolf Getner (1922–1923)
- Siarhiey Karp (1924)
- Adam Slavinskyi (1924)
- Stsiapan Yatskievich (1924–1929)
- Nichypar Aksiuchyts (1929–1930)
- Iosif Balodzka (1931–1933)
- Anton Karanieuski (1933–1934)
- Yemialian Zhukovich (1934–1937)
- Kanstantsin Budaryn (1940–1941)

=== 1941–1943 ===
- Vitaut Tumash (1941)
- Vacłaŭ Ivanoŭski (1942–1943)

=== 1944–1991 ===
- Kanstantsin Budaryn (1944–1945)
- Ivan Paromchyk (1945–1946)
- Kanstantsin Dluhasheuski (1946–1954)
- Vasil Sharapau (1954–1968)
- Mikhail Kovalev (1968–1977)
- Gennady Bartoshevich (1977)
- Stanislau Lukashevich (1977–1980)
- Heorhiy Tarazievich (1980–1983)
- Valiery Piachennikau (1983–1985)
- Uladzimir Mikhasiou (1985–1990)
- Mikhail Marynich (1990–1991)

=== 1991–present ===
- Alexander Gerasimenko (1991–1995)
- Vladimir Yermoshin (1995–2000)
- Mikhail Pavlov (2000–2010)
- Mikalay Ladutska (2010–2014)
- Andrey Shorats (2014–2018)
- Anatol Sivak (2018–2020)
- Vladimir Kukharev (2020–present)
