= Alexander Gerasimenko =

Belarusian politician and diplomat (1946–2017)

- Аляксандр Герасіменка; Александр Герасименко
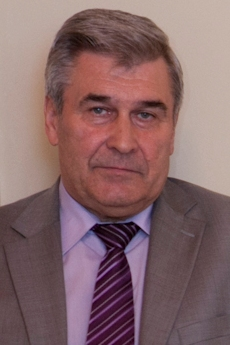
- Gerasimenko in 2013

Mayor of Minsk
- In office 1991–1994
- Preceded by: Mikhail Marynich
- Succeeded by: Vladimir Yermoshin

Personal details
- Born: 15 January 1946 Uzda, Byelorussian SSR, Soviet Union (now Belarus)
- Died: 2 August 2017 (aged 71) Minsk, Belarus

Alexander Mikhailovich Gerasimenko (Note: Belarusian: Алякса́ндр Міха́йлавіч Герасіме́нка, romanized: Aliaksandr Mikhaylavich Hierasimienka; Russian: Александр Михайлович Герасименко) (15 January 1946 – 2 August 2017) was a Belarusian politician and diplomat. He served as the mayor of Minsk, the nation's capital, from 1991 until 1995. (The office of mayor is also known as the Chairman of the Minsk City Executive Committee). He was also a member of the Supreme Council of Belarus until 1995. Gerasimenko was later appointed chairman of the Council of the Elders. Additionally, Gerasimenko served as the Ambassador of Belarus to Bulgaria and Greece (1995–2000), as well as Latvia.

On 4 September 1994 Gerasimenko held a joint opening ceremony for the Minsk International Educational Centre (IBB Minsk) together with Herbert Schnoor, the State-Minister of Northern Rhine-Westphalia.

Gerasimenko joined the Ministry of Foreign Affairs in 1995 after completed his term as Mayor of Minsk. He served as the concurrent Ambassador of Belarus to both Bulgaria and Greece from 1995 to 2000, after which he also served as the Deputy Foreign Minister from 11 September 2000. He was later appointed Ambassador to Latvia, a post he held from 13 April 2006 until 10 October 2013.

Gerasimenko was born on 15 January 1946. He died on 2 August 2017, at the age of 71. His funeral was held at the House of Writers in Minsk on 3 August.
