= Marina Dolgopolova =

Belarusian diplomat

- Марына Іванаўна Даўгаполава
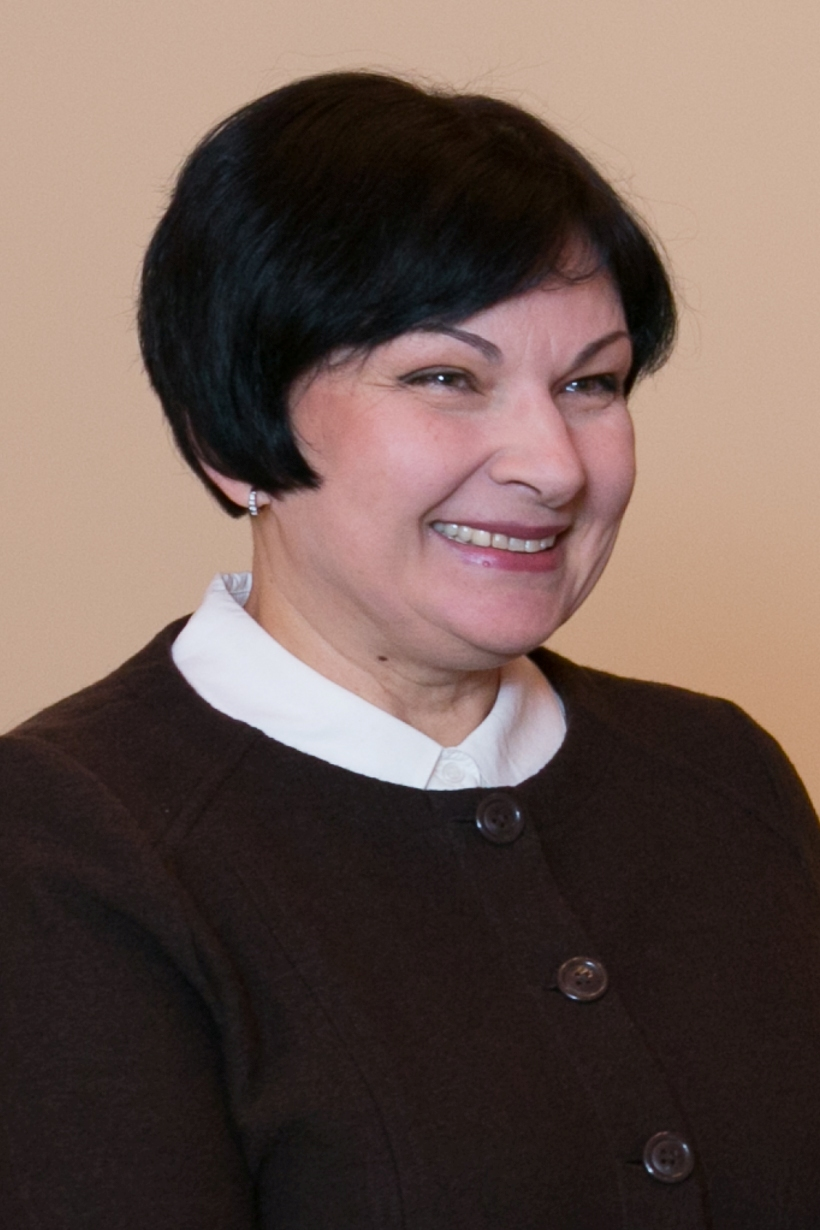
- Marina Dolgopolova in 2013

Personal details
- Born: 19 May 1960 (age 66) Babruysk, Mogilev Region, BSSR, USSR (now Babruysk, Belarus)

Marina Dolgopolova is a Belarusian diplomat. She was born on 19 May 1960 in Belarus, Mogilev region, Babruysk.

== Career ==
She has graduated from two schools- the Belarusian State University and the Academy of Public Administration. From 1984 to 1985 she worked, as a legal adviser of the Gomel regional agro-industrial association. From 1985 to 1992 she worked in youth public organizations and from 1992 to 1996 she worked in multiple banking systems.

From 1996 to 1998 she worked as the chief adviser for the Apparatus of the Council of Ministers of the Republic of Belarus. From 1998 to 2000 she worked in the Office of Executive Committee of the Union State and from 2000 to 2002 she was the deputy head of the department of Ministry of Foreign Affairs for the Union State. From 2002 to 2008 she was the Belarusian ambassador in Armenia and from 2008 to 2013 she worked as the Head of the Department of Russia and the CIS countries of the Ministry of Foreign Affairs.

From 2013 to 2018, she was the Belarusian ambassador in Latvia and from 2019 to 2025 she was the representative of the Republic of Belarus to the statutory and other bodies of the Commonwealth of Independent States.
