= Ministry of Transport and Communications (Belarus) =

Ministry of Transport and Communications of Belarus
- Міністэрства транспарту і камунікацый Рэспублікі Беларусь; Министерство транспорта и коммуникаций Республики Беларусь
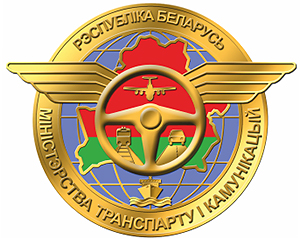
- Ministry emblem

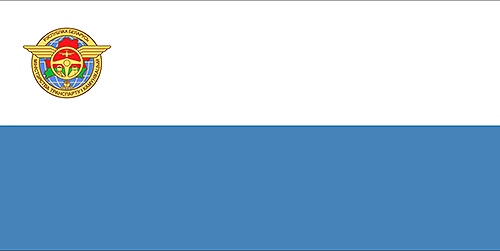
- Ministry flag

Agency overview
- Formed: August 25, 1991; 34 years ago
- Preceding agency: Ministry of Transport of the Byelorussian SSR
- Jurisdiction: Government of Belarus
- Headquarters: Minsk; 53.915425°N 27.566025°E
- Minister responsible: Alexei Lyakhnovich
- Child agencies: Belavtodor; Belarusian Railway
- Website: mintrans.gov.by

Ministry of Transport and Communications of Belarus (Belarusian: Міністэрства транспарту і камунікацый Рэспублікі Беларусь) is a ministry in the Government of Belarus regulating the activities of automobile, rail, urban electric, inland waterway, maritime transport, and civil aviation. Since July 28, 2023, the position has been held by Alexei Lyakhnovich.

== History ==
On July 28, 1939, the People's Commissariat of Automobile Transport of the BSSR was established, which in 1946 was transformed into the Ministry of Automobile Transport of the BSSR. In June 1953, it was reorganized into the Ministry of Roads and Transport, and in November into the Ministry of Automobile Transport and Highways of the BSSR. On June 20, 1956, the Presidium of the Supreme Soviet of the BSSR changed its status from union-republican to republican (in connection with the abolition of the Ministry of Automobile Transport and Highways of the USSR). On July 12, the ministry again received the name Ministry of Automobile Transport of the BSSR. From May 1957 to April 23, 1963, the Main Directorate of Automobile Transport under the Council of Ministers of the BSSR acted in place of the ministry. By the Resolution of the Council of Ministers of the BSSR of July 17, 1956, the Main Administration of River Fleet under the Council of Ministers of the BSSR was established on the basis of the River Transport Administration under the Council of Ministers of the BSSR.

By the Decree of the Presidium of the Supreme Soviet of the BSSR of June 16, 1988, the Ministry of Transport of the BSSR was established on the basis of the Ministry of Road Transport of the BSSR and the Main Administration of River Fleet. In 1991, it was renamed the Ministry of Transport of the Republic of Belarus.

By the Resolution of the Supreme Soviet of Belarus of February 5, 1993, the Ministry of Transport and Communications of the Republic of Belarus was established on the basis of the Ministry of Transport. By Resolution No. 491 of the Council of Ministers of the Republic of Belarus of July 22, 1993, the Belarusian Railways and the Belarusian Civil Aviation Administration were transferred to the ministry. In 1995-1996, civil aviation and railway transport were removed from the ministry by decrees of the President of the Republic of Belarus, but were returned to it by decree of the President of the Republic of Belarus dated May 5, 2006, No. 289. The current Regulation on the ministry was approved by Resolution of the Council of Ministers of the Republic of Belarus dated July 31, 2006, No. 985.

== Structure ==
The Ministry's central office consists of one department, two main departments, four departments, five divisions, and one sector:

- Aviation Department;
- Main Directorate of Motor Roads (reorganized from the Belavtodor Department on July 1, 2013, as part of a reduction in the number of civil servants);
- Main Directorate of Economy and Finance;
- Department of Development Programs and International Cooperation;
- Department of Automobile and Urban Passenger Transport;
- Department of Sea and River Transport;
- Department of Operational Control and Support;
- Railway Transport Department;
- Department of Organizational and Legal Work;
- Department of State Property Management;
- Department of Accounting and Methodology;
- Department of Human Resources;
- Transport Security Sector.

The Ministry oversees a number of organizations in the fields of automobile and water transport, road construction, and Belarusian Railways.
