= Vladimir Yermoshin =

Belarusian politician

- Уладзімер Ярмошын; Владимир Ермошин
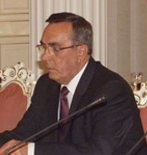
- Yermoshin in 2001

4th Prime Minister of Belarus
- In office 18 February 2000 – 1 October 2001
- President: Alexander Lukashenko
- Preceded by: Sergei Ling
- Succeeded by: Gennady Novitsky

Mayor of Minsk
- In office 1995–2000
- Preceded by: Alexander Gerasimenko
- Succeeded by: Mikhail Pavlov

Personal details
- Born: 26 October 1942 (age 83) Pronsk, Russian SFSR, Soviet Union

Vladimir Vasilievich Yermoshin (Note: Belarusian: Уладзі́мер Васі́льевіч Ярмо́шын, romanized: Uładzimier Vasilevič Jarmóšyn; Russian: Влади́мир Васи́льевич Ермо́шин, romanized: Vladimir Vasiljevič Jermošin) (born 26 October 1942) is a Belarusian politician who served as Prime Minister of Belarus from 2000 to 2001. Previously, he served as the Mayor of Minsk from 1995 to 2000.

== Prime minister ==
He served as was Prime Minister of Belarus from 18 February 2000 to 1 October 2001. Yermoshin exercised his Prime Ministerial office under the Presidency of Alexander Lukashenko.

=== Mayor of Minsk ===
Yermoshin previously served as Mayor of Minsk, capital of Belarus, from 1995 to 2000.

== See also ==
- Politics of Belarus
