= Mikhail Marynich =

Belarusian diplomat, politician, and pro-democracy activist

- Міхаіл Марыніч; Михаил Маринич

Chairman of the Minsk City Executive Committee
- In office 1 January 1990 – 1 January 1991
- Preceded by: Uladzimir Mikhasiou
- Succeeded by: Alexander Gerasimenko

Personal details
- Born: 13 January 1940; Staryja Haloŭčycy, Byelorussian SSR, Soviet Union (now Belarus)
- Died: 17 October 2014 (aged 74); Minsk, Belarus
- Political party: Zubr

Mikhail Apanasavich Marynich (Note: Belarusian: Міхаіл Апана́савіч Марыніч; Russian: Михаил Афанасьевич Маринич, romanized: Mikhail Afanasyevich Marinich) (13 January 1940 — 17 October 2014) was a Belarusian diplomat, politician, and pro-democracy activist. Minsk city mayor, minister of foreign economic affairs and ambassador. He was also the inspirational leader for Zubr, a youth resistance movement.

In 2001 Marynich resigned from his position of Belarus Ambassador to Latvia, made a public statement against the Belarus political regime and ran for the Presidency. He was among the first public officials in Belarus to resign and start a political fight against Alexander Lukashenko. Such a step was seen as a large risk given that a number of Lukashenko's opponents disappeared or were killed in the late 1990s.

After the election Marynich established the Business Initiative NGO and became one of the opposition leaders who had immense support and respect from his former colleagues, business community and the political opposition.

In early 2004 Marynich was arrested for his political beliefs. He spent 8 months in prison before trial. During this time the regime was trying to come up with a reason for a criminal case. On 30 December 2004 Marynich was accused and imprisoned on dubious charges of stealing computers from an NGO, of which he was himself a director. The computers belonged to the US Embassy, and the US Department issued a statement saying they didn't have any claims against Marynich. The United States condemned this abuse and earlier abuses of the judicial system by the Lukashenko regime to persecute Belarusian citizens for their political beliefs.

Marynich was given a five-year sentence. In March 2005, in Orsha prison, Marynich suffered a cerebral stroke. The stroke was provoked by the prison administration when Marynich was denied access to his medicines after a very hard transportation in unheated train wagons from Minsk to Orsha. He was told along with other prisoners to stay on his knees on the train platform. Even after the stroke Marynich was not released from prison. Amid growing domestic and international pressure he was released from jail one year later, on April 14, 2006, shortly after Lukashenko started his controversial third term in office.

In 2006, Amnesty International declared that it considered him a prisoner of conscience.

In 2010, the UN Human Rights Committee found that in Marynich's case, Belarus violated articles 7, 9, 10, paragraph 1, and 14, paragraphs 1 and 2, of the International Covenant on Civil and Political Rights.

Marynich died on 17 October 2014, at the age of 74.

Marynich is survived by three sons, Igor, Pavel and Mikhail. Marynich's first wife is called Ludmila. His widow Tatyana Marynich is mother of their son Mikhail.
