= Aleksandr Chervyakov (born 1966) =

Belarusian politician (born 1966)

- Александр Червяков; Аляксандр Чарвякоў
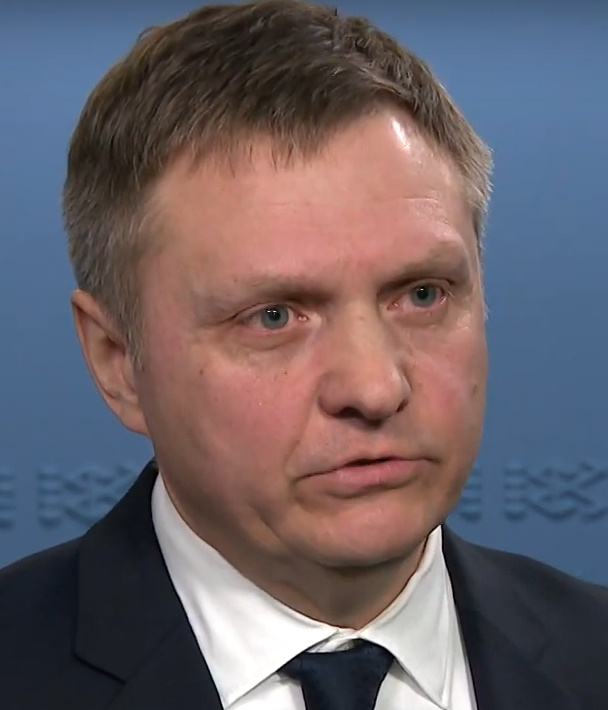
- Chervyakov in 2020

Ambassador of Belarus to China
- Incumbent
- Assumed office 30 January 2024
- President: Alexander Lukashenko
- Prime Minister: Roman Golovchenko; Alexander Turchin
- Preceded by: Yuri Senko

Minister of Economy
- In office 4 January 2020 – 20 November 2023
- President: Alexander Lukashenko
- Prime Minister: Syarhey Rumas; Roman Golovchenko
- Preceded by: Dmitry Krutoi
- Succeeded by: Yuri Chebotar

Personal details
- Born: 1966 (age 59–60)

Aleksandr Viktorovich Chervyakov (Russian: Александр Викторович Червяков; born 1966) is a Belarusian politician serving as ambassador to China since 2024. From 2020 to 2023, he served as minister of economy.

In 2023, Aleksandr Chervyakov was added to the sanctions list of Canada.

== Early life ==
Chervyakov was born on 15 September 1966 in Babinichi, which was part of the Orsha district in the Byelorussian SSR at the time of his birth. In 1988, he graduated from the Belarusian Russian State Agricultural Academy in Horki.

After graduating, he worked as an engineer and then was the leading mechanical engineer of a pig-breeding complex at the Yubileyny state farm, which was also located in the Orsha district. From 1991 to 1994 he studied again at his alma mater. Afterward, he worked at the Department of Mechanization of Animal Husbandry of Agricultural Production in a variety of roles such as an assistant, senior lecturer, associate professor, and as a doctoral student. In 2002 he became a Candidate of Sciences. In 2010, after nearly two decades at the department, he left to in 2010 to become Director of the state institution "Research Institute of Economic Research of the Ministry of Economy of Belarus". He kept this position until January 2017, when he became Deputy Minister of Economy.

== Political career ==
On 4 January 2020, he was appointed Minister of Economy. He quickly spoke in favor of finding alternatives to using raw materials. His main tasks upon being appointed were dealing with energy, Russia-Belarus relations, and working with the Eurasian Economic Union as Belarus held the chair for the organization in 2020.
