= Boris Vasilyevich Batura =

Belarusian politician (born 1947)

- Борис Васильевич Батура; Барыс Васільевіч Батура
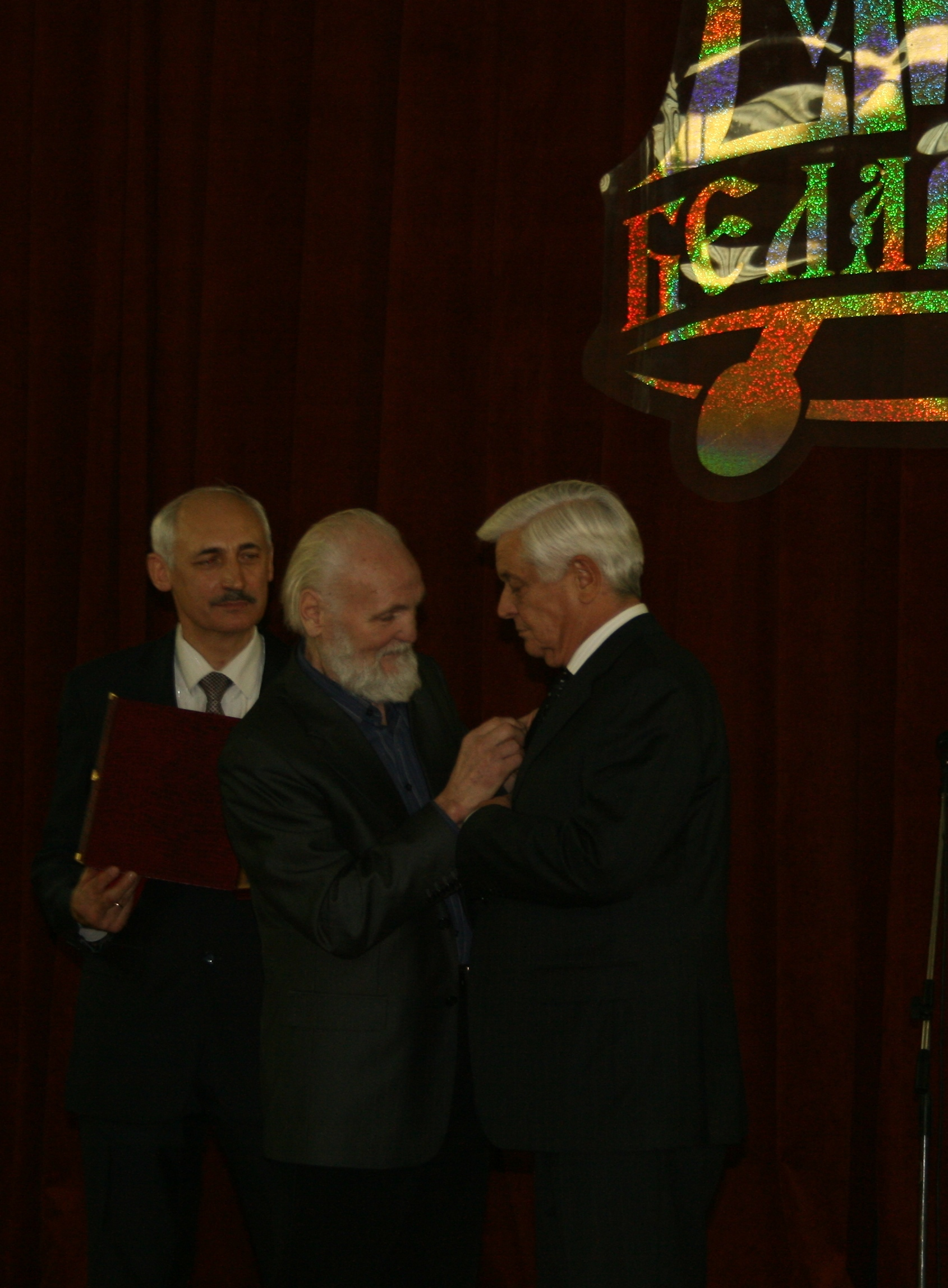
- Batura in 2012 (right).

Speaker of the Council of the Republic
- In office 31 October 2008 – 20 May 2010
- President: Alexander Lukashenko
- Prime Minister: Sergei Sidorsky
- Preceded by: Gennady Novitsky
- Succeeded by: Anatoli Rubinov

Chairman of the Minsk Regional Executive Committee
- In office 31 May 2010 – 8 November 2013
- Preceded by: Leonid Krupets
- Succeeded by: Semyon Shapiro

Chairman of the Mogilev Regional Executive Committee
- In office 14 November 2000 – 31 October 2008
- Preceded by: Mikhail Vladimirovich Drazhin
- Succeeded by: Pyotr Rudnik

Minister of Housing and Communal Services
- In office 1990–1999
- Preceded by: Office established
- Succeeded by: Alexandre Milkota

Deputy Prime Minister of Belarus
- In office 28 June 1999 – November 2000

Personal details
- Born: 28 July 1947 (age 79) Vawkavysk, Byelorussian SSR, Soviet Union (now Belarus)
- Party: Independent
- Education: Belarusian National Technical University
- Occupation: Politician

Boris Vasilyevich Batura (also transliterated as Barys Batura; born 28 July 1947) is a Belarusian politician. He has served in a number of notable roles in Belarus, including as Speaker of the Council of the Republic from 2008 to 2010 and Chairman of the Minsk Regional Executive Committee from 2010 to 2013.

Born in Vawkavysk in the Byelorussian Soviet Socialist Republic, Batura graduated in 1970 from Belarusian National Technical University (BTNU) with a degree in mechanical engineering. Afterwards, he served in numerous roles in the Grodno Regional Executive Committee while simultaneously rising through the ranks of the Ministry of Housing and Communal Service. He eventually became Minister of Housing and Communal Services in 1990, a position he held until 1999, where he notably helped pass the Law on Privatization of the Housing Fund. Afterward, he served as Chairman of the Mogilev Regional Executive Committee until 2008, where he was widely credited with reversing economical hardships and attracting foreign investment - most of which as Russian. Nominated by Gennady Novitsky by to be Speaker of the Council of Republics on 31 October 2008, he was appointed soon after with no discourse. He had previously been a member of the Council in the second and third convocations. In this role, he rejected European calls for the abolition of the death penalty in Belarus, and notably received a delegation from Iran, which he called Belarus's most important partner in the Middle East.

It was announced on 20 May 2010 that Batura would become Chairman of the Minsk Regional Executive Committee. In this role he led a rise in the development of the private sector of Minsk, including major investment projects in mining, Chinese facilities like the China–Belarus Industrial Park which was approved for $5 billion in 2011, and a joint Swiss-Belarusian electric train venture. He was abruptly fired on 8 November 2013 for not overseeing modernization efforts at Borisovdrev timber mill, which led him to retire from politics. Since then he had led the organization "Twin Cities", which works with the international sister city movements to promote Belarusian cities abroad, particularly in Russia.

== Early life ==
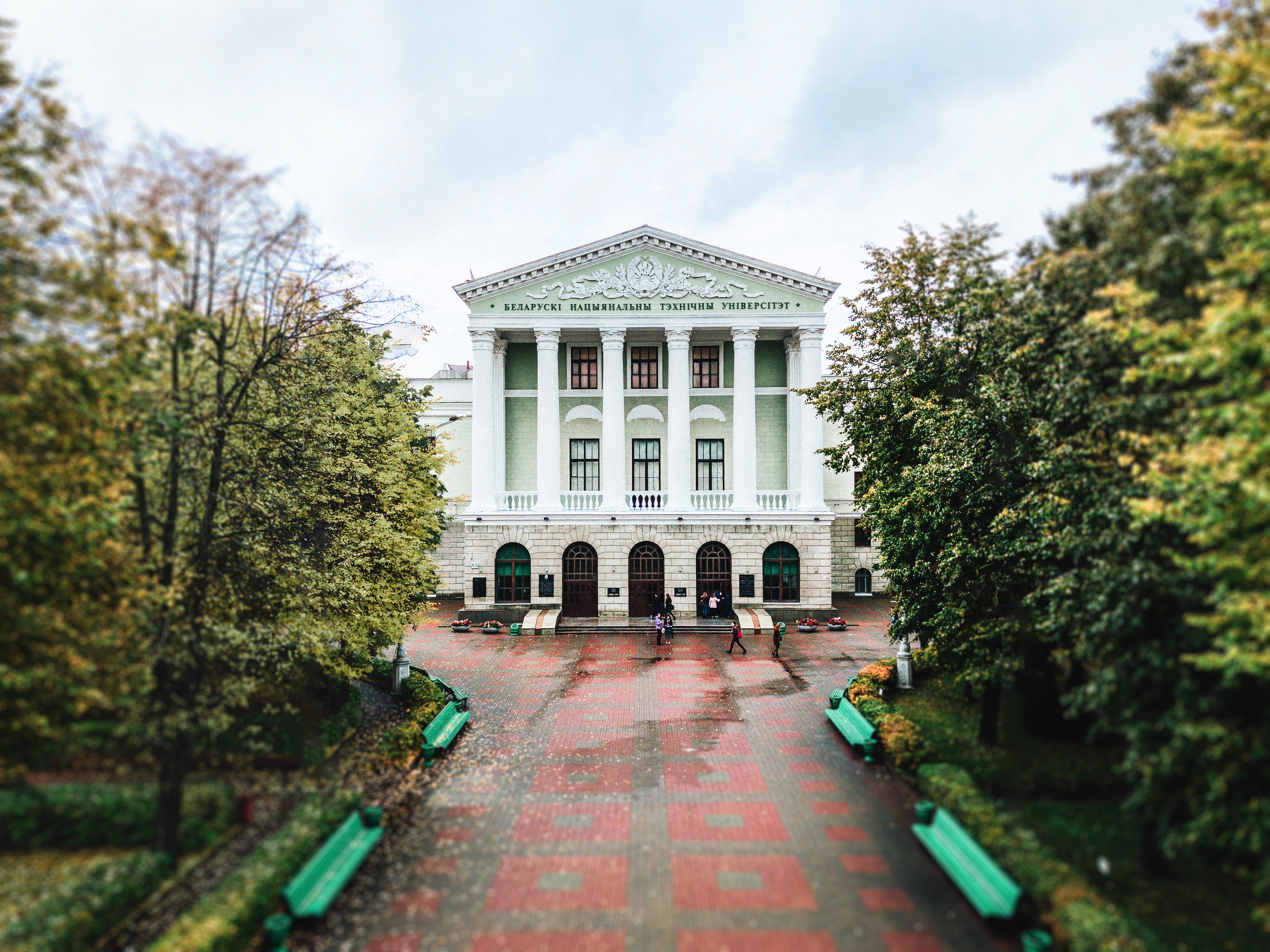
Batura attended from the Belarusian National Technical University (BNTU), graduating in 1970 with a degree in mechanical engineering.

Batura was born on 28 July 1947 in Vawkavysk in Grodno Region of the Byelorussian Soviet Socialist Republic. In 1970 he graduated from the Belarusian National Technical University with a degree in mechanical engineering. Prior to 1973, he worked as a shop foreman, process engineer, and was head of the technical control department UZH-15/11 of the Department of Internal Affairs of the Grodno Regional Executive Committee.

From 1973 to 1979 he was Head of the Volkovysk Combine of Utilities, another department of the Grodno Regional Executive Committee. Then, from 1979 to 1983, he was Deputy Head of the Department of Housing and Communal Services alongside the Department of Mechanics and Energy in Grodno. He rose through the ranks of the Housing Department to become First Deputy Head then Head of the department by 1987.

In 1987 he became Deputy Minister of Housing and Communal Service of the BSSR and Deputy Chairman of the Grodno Regional Executive Committee, positions he held until his appointment as minister in 1990.

== Political career ==
=== Minister of Housing and Communal Services ===
In 1990, he became Minister of Housing and Communal Services.

His main project as Minister of Housing was the development of the Law on Privatization of the Housing Fund, which transferred housing from state to private ownership and was adapted in 1993.

In June 1999 he officially left the position. Briefly afterwards he was the Deputy Prime Minister of Belarus from 28 June 1999 to November 2000.

=== Chairman of Mogilev ===
From November 2000, he was Chairman of the Mogilev Regional Executive Committee.

He was widely credited with reversing economical hardships in Mogilev, making it have good economic performance and attract foreign investors, most of whom are Russian. Some of the foreign investment projects he helped bring to Mogilev, which would later go nationwide, include Servolux, Syabar, Old Fortress, and Belatmit.

He left the post in order to become speaker on 31 October 2008. For his work in Mogilev, he was given the highest reward - an honorary diploma - by Valery Ilyankov who was head of the work department and Batura stated that he wished it would become the best city in the future.

=== Speaker of the Council of Republics ===
On 31 October 2008 he was nominated to be Speaker of the Council of Republics by Gennady Novitsky, and was appointed to the position later that day with no discourse. He had previously been a member of the Council in the second and third convocations. He was appointed a member of the Standing Committee on Regional Policy and Local Self-Government during his time in the Council of the Republic.

He rejected calls for the abolition of the death penalty, saying that many citizens believed in it for serious crimes. He proposed a series of preparatory measures instead, including forming and monitoring public opinion about the death penalty. He also welcomed a delegation from Iran, with Batura meeting Ali Larijani and Manouchehr Mottaki, and he stated that there should be close integration between the two nations. Batura also said that Iran was the country's most important partner in the Middle East.

On 20 May 2010, he stepped down as chairman to become Chairman of the Minsk Regional Executive Committee.

=== Chairman of Minsk ===
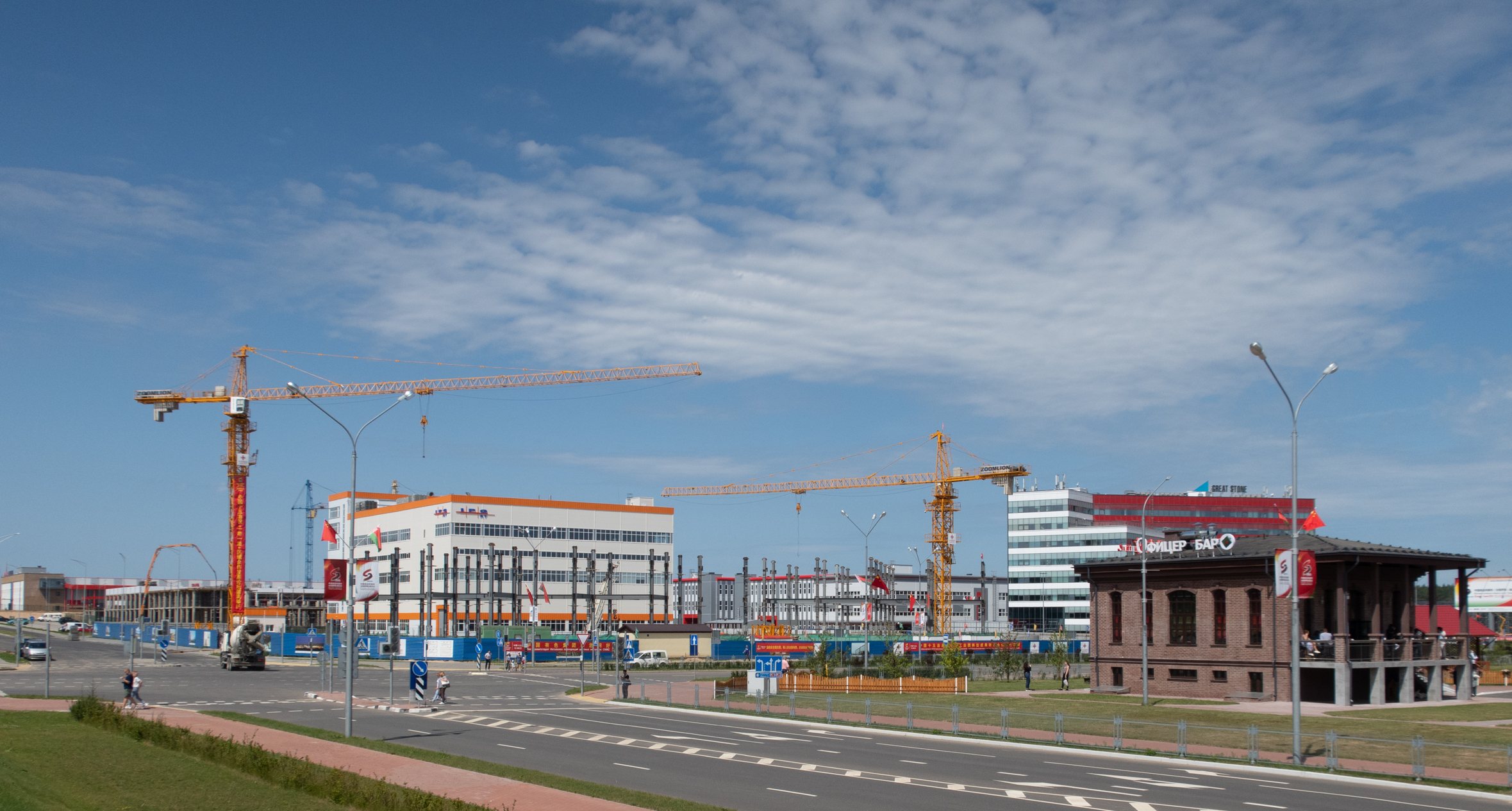
As Chairman of the Minsk Regional Executive Committee, he oversaw and approved the planning of the China–Belarus Industrial Park (pictured here).

On 20 May 2010, it was announced that Batura would become Chairman of the Minsk Regional Executive Committee, which was described as unexpected due to the fact he had been with Mogilev for a long time.

A primary focus of his administration was in mining, with him helping persuade two major investment projects: a chemical plant for raw minerals and another for the production of NPK fertilizers. The construction of the $5 billion China–Belarus Industrial Park in Smolevichi became an important part of his administration with planning of up to 600,000 Chinese employees to work there within 30 years, alongside another Chinese facility in Borisov for the assembly of cars. He also focused on the livestock industry in Minsk, particularly in creating pig breeding complexes instead of small farms. Another major project was the assembly of electric trains in a joint Belarusian-Swiss venture by Belkommunmash Holding Management Company and Stadler Rail Group.

He was abruptly fired on 8 November 2013, a day after Lukashenko took a tour of the Borisovdrev timber mill, which had not been gone through with modernization efforts after a year, and Lukashenko said Batura should instead run the factory. Batura refused to run the mill and said he was going into an early retirement. Soon after he criticized Lukashenko, saying he was ready to be arrested and that "we are not free people anyway".

=== Other activities ===
From 1999 to 2013 he headed the Volleyball Federation of Belarus, which he left following his firing as Chairman of the Minsk Executive Committee. He was appointed honorary chairman afterwards, and was succeeded by Valyantsin Shayeu. In the past he was also Deputy Chairman of the Parliamentary Assembly of the Union of Belarus and Russia, Chairman of the Eurasian Economic Community, a member of the assembly of the CIS, and a member of the Council of the Collective Security Treaty Organization.

After leaving his political positions, he continued as Chairman of the Belarusian organization "Twin Cities" which he held since 28 December 2010. Twin Cities helps the development of the international sister city movements, with the organization's particular focus being on promoting Belarusian cities abroad. He has worked in this role to bring mutual cooperation in the relationship between Russia and Belarus. He also became a member of the board of directors of a mining and drilling operation called Soligorsk JSC "Trust Shakhtospetsstroy" and a member of the Council of Elders. The Council of Elders was recently created in December 2020 for former members of the Council of the Republic to discuss the socio-economic development of Belarus.

== Personal life ==
Batura lives in Drazdy, an elite village in the outskirts of Minsk. More than 100 representatives close to Lukashenko live in the village, and based on the pricing of the houses his net income is at least $1 million. According to a 2012 interview with the state-owned CTV channel he drives to work himself, has a salary of about $14 million, and his only hobby is tennis. Batura is married.

== Honors and awards ==
=== National orders ===
- Order of the Badge of Honour (1986)
- Order of the Fatherland, III degree (21 November 2001)
- Order of Honour (29 July 2004)
- Certificate of Honor of the Government of Moscow (10 December 2004)
- Order of the Fatherland, II degree (30 August 2007)
- IPA CIS 25 Years (CIS; 27 March 2017)
- Honorary citizen of Mogilev (2008)

=== Ecclesial orders ===
- Order of Saint Cyril of Turov (Belarusian Orthodox Church; 2007)
- Order of Glory and Honor, III degree (Russian Orthodox Church; 2013)
- Order of the Venerable Euphrosyne of Polotsk (Belarusian Orthodox Church; 2017)
