= Vladimir Semashko =

Belarusian politician (born 1949)

Vladimir Ilyich Semashko
- Уладзімір Ільіч Сямашка; Владимир Ильич Семашко
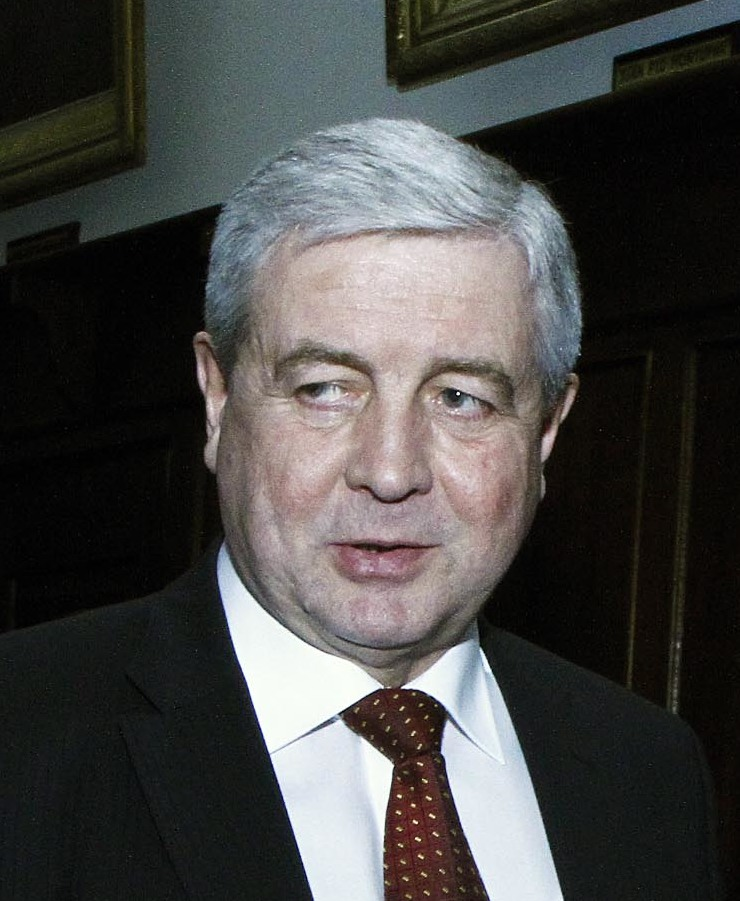
- Semashko in Ecuador in 2015 alongside Ecuadorian minister Richard Espinoza.

Ambassador of the Republic of Belarus to the Russian Federation
- In office 13 November 2018 – 1 August 2022
- President: Alexander Lukashenko
- Prime Minister: Syarhey Rumas; Roman Golovchenko
- Preceded by: Igor Petrishenko
- Succeeded by: Dmitry Krutoi

Deputy Prime Minister of the Republic of Belarus
- In office 27 December 2014 – 18 August 2018 Serving with Anatoly Kalinin; Mikhail Rusyi; Vladimir Dvornik; Vasily Zharko; Piotr Prokopovich
- President: Alexander Lukashenko
- Prime Minister: Andrei Kobyakov
- Succeeded by: Vasily Matyushevsky

First Deputy Prime Minister of Belarus
- In office 28 July 2003 – December 2014
- President: Alexander Lukashenko
- Prime Minister: Sergei Sidorsky; Mikhail Myasnikovich
- Preceded by: Andrei Kobyakov
- Succeeded by: Vasily Matyushevsky

Minister of Energy of the Republic of Belarus
- In office 12 December 2001 – 28 July 2003
- President: Alexander Lukashenko
- Prime Minister: Vladimir Yermoshin
- Preceded by: Uladzimir Navumau
- Succeeded by: Aliaksandr Aheyeu

Personal details
- Born: 20 November 1949 (age 76) Kalinkavichy, Gomel region, Byelorussian SSR, Soviet Union (now Belarus)
- Education: Belarusian National Technical University
- Occupation: Politician

Vladimir Semashko (Belarusian: Уладзімір Ільіч Сямашка; born 20 November 1949) is a Belarusian politician. He served as First Deputy Prime Minister of Belarus from 2003 to 2014 and one of the Deputy Prime Ministers of the Republic of Belarus from 2014 to 2018, where he acted as the government's chief negotiator on oil and gas issues and oversaw major industrial construction. From 2018 to 2022, he also served as Ambassador of Belarus to Russia.

== Early life ==
Semashko was born on 20 November 1949 in the village of Kalinkavichy, which was then part of the Byelorussian SSR of the Soviet Union. According to interviews, he stated his father fought in World War II and his mother worked in the wartime industry. In 1972, he graduated from the Belarusian National Technical University, and afterwords he completed his mandatory service in the Soviet Armed Forces.

After returning to Belarus in 1974, he started working within engineering and industrial design. He was first a design engineer, before becoming head of KB-44, a design bureau. He was later appointed Chief Engineer of the Coordinated Production and Technical Complex of Special Machine Building and was chief engineer of the F.E. Dzerzhinsky Special Design Bureau for Machine Building of Integral, a circuit building company, by 1996. He then took on leadership roles in major Belarusian enterprises such as the role of General Director Minsk Production Association "Horizont" in 1996, which he has continued to do currently even after a major reorganization of Horizont in 2000.

== Political career ==
On 12 December 2001, by order of the then President of Belarus, Alexander Lukashenko, he was appointed Minister of Energy of the Republic of Belarus. During his tenure, he was responsible for gas negotiations with Russia's Gazprom after the company accused Belarus of overdrawing 1.5 billion cubic meters of gas and failing to pay for part of its supplies. Semashko called thee company's allegations "groundless", and he stated Gazprom had no legal basis to demand exclusive control over Belarus's gas imports and he said the country would continue to buy from Itera. The dispute ended with him securing an increased gas quota of 18.5 bcm for 2003. He also attempted to restore order in domestic energy payments for Belenergo and Beltopgaz, in addition to getting the companies to repay their debts. In addition, he reduced external energy debt and launched modernization projects domestically at Lukoml GRES, Berezovskaya GRES, Minsk CHPP-3, and Plotosk-3.

In December 2003, he was approved to the post of First Deputy Prime Minister of the Republic of Belarus. He was demoted down to one of the Deputy Prime Ministers of Belarus in 2014. In these roles, he mainly focused on Belarus's economic and energy policy, and was regarding as Belarus's strongest negotiator on energy issues. He emphasized efforts to diversify exports beyond Russia, reduce the economy's vulnerability to regional recessions, and attract foreign investment in manufacturing. He oversaw privatization plans and defended state-owned enterprises, calling them a pillar of social stability. Regarding energy, he attempted to diversify gas supplies, incpluding exploring electricity imports from Central Asia to cut down costs and seeking access to independent Russian gas suppliers like Novatek. He was heavily involved in the construction of the Astravets Nuclear Power Plant near Lithuania. However, he was controversial among members of the Belarusian opposition for pushing major industriral modernization efforts that had massive cost overruns and long-terms losses including the BMZ pipe-rolling modernization, oil refinery upgrades in Mozyr and Novopolotsk, and a metal construction plant in Molodechno.

In August 2018, he was dismissed by Lukashenko during a cabinet reshuffle. Lukashenko immediately insisted that this was not related to age or health reasons, and said that he would instead be rotated into a different position. He was however, seen soon after in negotiations between Belarus and Russia in Sochi in September, which Lukashenko's press secretary, Natalya Eismont, said was due to his deep knowledge of the oil-and-gas dispute that the government considered him an expert on. On 13 November 2018, he was officially confirmed as Ambassador of Belarus to Russia, while also simultaneously serving as plenipotentiary representative to the CIS Economic Council, CSTO, and as special representative for the integration cooperation in the Union State, EAEU, CIS, and CSTO.

As ambassador, he continued to take a slightly critical stance towards gas agreements with Russia, stating the country had not fulfilled its agreements because Belarus was paying more than twice the amount of gas that others Russian regions paid, which he argued violated the Union State agreements. On 3 August 2020, he was summoned by the Russian MFA after 33 Russian Wagner mercenaries in Belarus shortlyy before the 2020 Belarusian presidential election, which had caused in strain in the two country's relations. However, by 2022, relations improved and he stated that the two countries were moving towards deeper economic integration despite Western sanctions. After the Russian invasion of Ukraine, he publicly criticized Western countries of revisionism regarding World War II, but he did not directly comment on the invasion itself.

On 18 January 2022 he was hospitalized in Moscow due to a heart attack, and later on 2 August 2022 it was confirmed he was dismissed from the post.

== Personal life ==
He is married to Natalia Semashko, who is the founder and director of Belkontinent-97, a logging company. They have two daughthers: Irina Tatarnikova, who was Deputy General Director at Dabrabyt Bank and married to an art editor, and Tatyana Eliseeva, who was the former head of Integrative Psychodrama and is married to Ivan Eliseev who in 2014 was investigated by the KGB for tax fraud.

He owns property in the elite Drazdy district of Minsk, where most of Lukashenko's allies live, and a dacha in the Goroshki garden near Stalin Line which is also in Minsk.
