= Belarus–Iran relations =

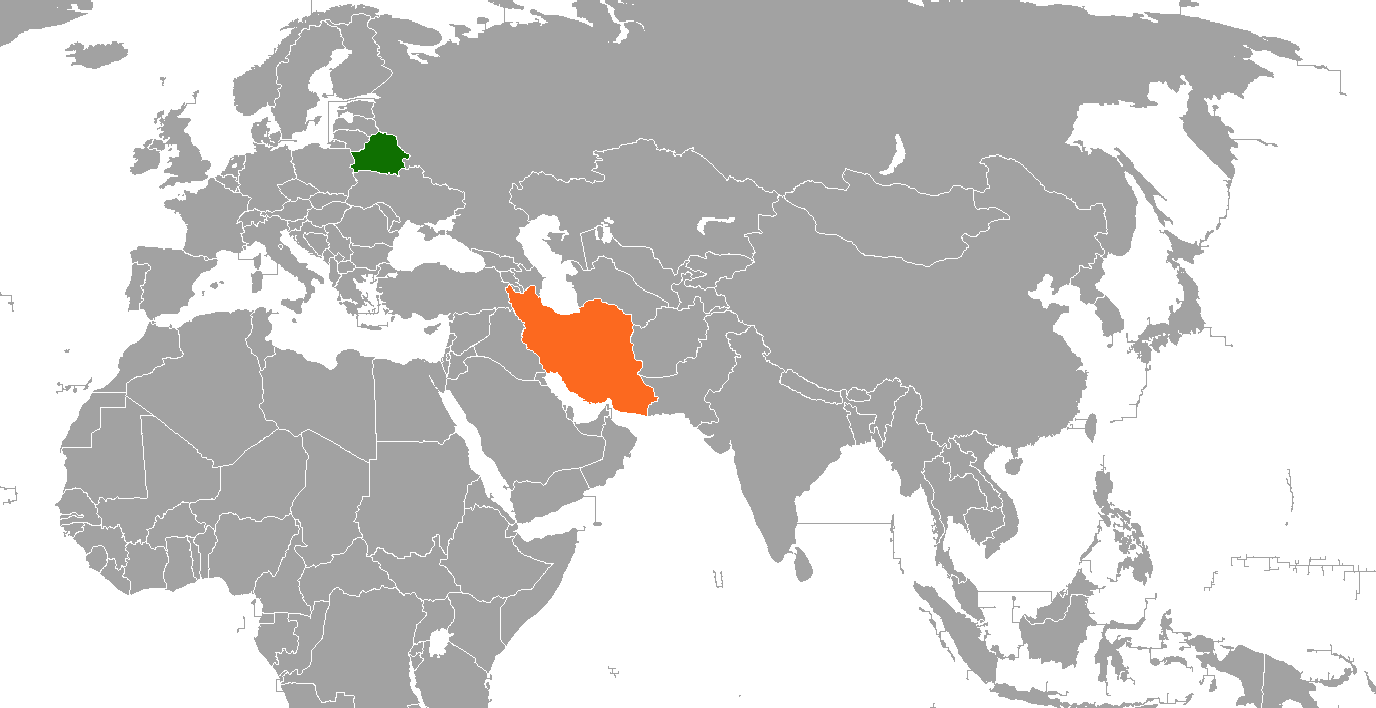

- Belarus: Iran

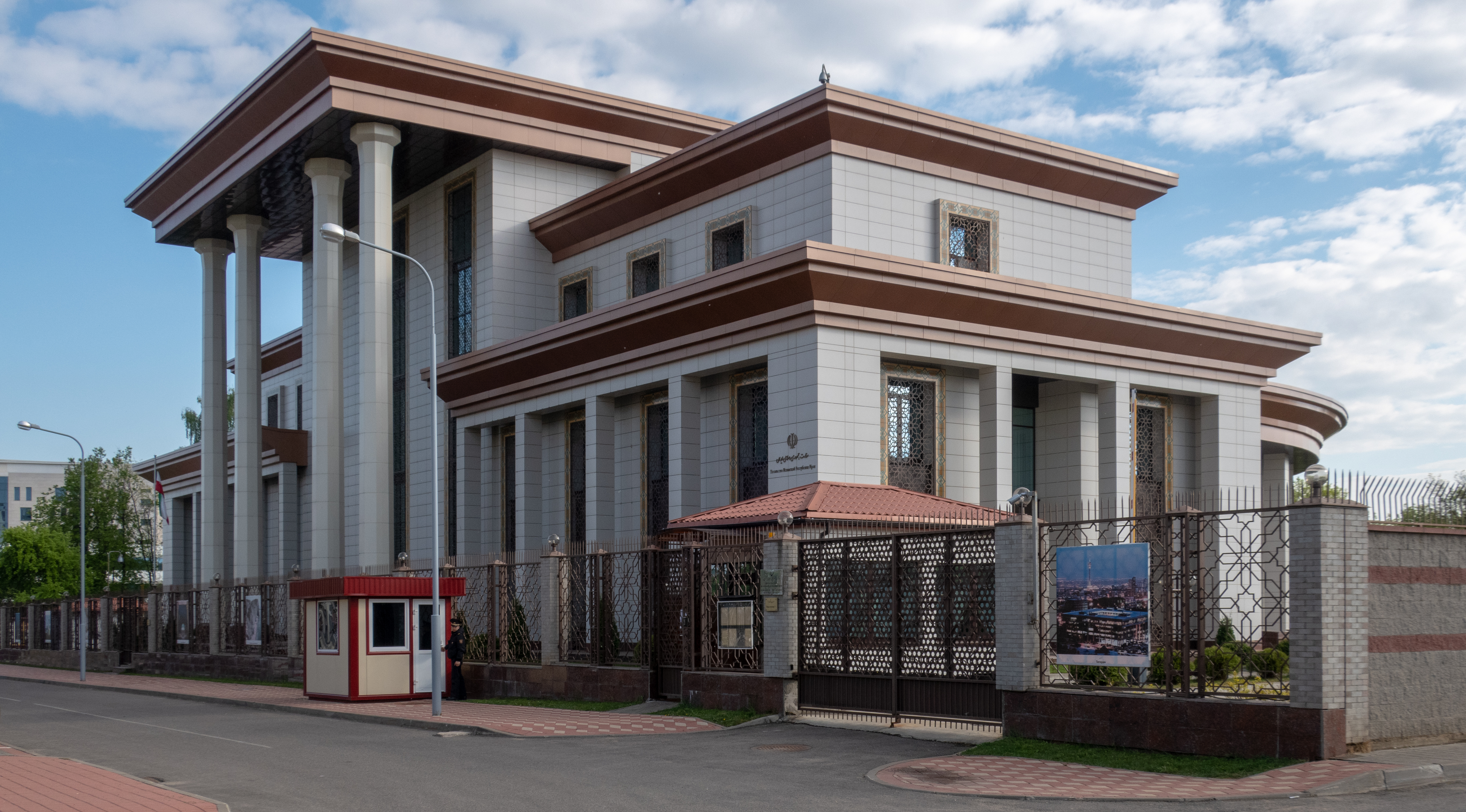
Embassy of Iran in Minsk

The Byelorussian Soviet Socialist Republic recognized de facto the Islamic Republic of Iran in February 1979, and Belarus and Iran established de jure diplomatic relations in 1992. Belarus has an embassy in Tehran. Iran has an embassy in Minsk.

The two countries have enjoyed good relations in recent years reflected in regular high level meetings and various agreements. In 2008, Belarusian Foreign Minister Sergei Martynov described Iran as an important partner of his country in the region and the world. Both Iran and Belarus are considered allies of Russia.

== Agreements ==
In July 2004, an Iran-Belarus joint economic commission meeting was held and an agreement was signed on bolstering mutual economic cooperation.

In April 2006, the two countries signed a number of economic and trade agreements.

In November 2006, Belarusian President Alexander Lukashenko visited Tehran and signed agreements to expand bilateral cooperation and reaffirmed Belarus' support of Iran's nuclear efforts.

=== 2007 meeting ===
In May 2007, the two countries signed cooperation accords, following a meeting of Belarusian President Lukashenko and Iranian President Mahmoud Ahmadinejad. They signed a joint communique on the results of the visit to Belarus by the President Ahmadinejad.

President Lukashenko said that Belarus and Iran have removed all the impediments to the bilateral trade. President Ahmadinejad said "from now on Belarusian-Iranian relations will develop to ensure stability and security in the world."

== Trade ==
In 2008, Belarus-Iran trade made $93.8 million (23.6% up), with Belarus’ export as high as $83.7 million (25.8% up), import — $10.2 million (8.3% up). The foreign trade surplus totaled $73.5 million. Belarus’ main exports are potash fertilizers, synthetic fibers, synthetic fiber cords, while the main imports are cars, grape, spare parts for automobiles and tractors.

In 2008, Iranian investments in Belarus amounted to $13.1 million, including $9.9 million in direct investments. In 2010, Iran inaugurated a large copper wire factory and the second phase of Samand car assembly line in Belarus.

Belarus and Iran claim that they can raise the mutual trade turnover up to $1 billion, said Iranian Commerce Minister Masoud Mir-Kazemi as he met with Prime Minister of Belarus Sergei Sidorsky. Currently the two countries' trade value stands at $3.250 billion.

== Military cooperation ==
It has been reported that Belarus has exported tanks, armored personnel carriers, and heavy artillery to Iran.

In January 2007, the two countries signed a memorandum of understanding for defence.

In 2009, it was reported that Belarus was selling Russian-made Iskander-M tactical missile systems to Iran

== Energy ==
In May 2007, Iran granted Belarus greater access to oil reserves following a meeting of the two presidents. what Belarusian President Lukashenko called a "strategic partnership." Iran gave Belarus long-discussed access to the Jofeir oil field, which is near the Iraq border and could produce up to 30,000 barrels a day once operational. Lukashenko said the crude from Jofeir would either be refined in Iran or simply extracted by Belarus and sold on world markets. It would be the first energy project abroad for Belarus.

In May 2009, Belarus Deputy Prime Minister Vladimir Semashko met Vice Governor of the Central Bank of the Islamic Republic of Iran Reza Raei. Following this meeting, the Central Bank of Iran announced it will lend $212m to Belarus' state-run firm Belorusneft for the development of the Jofeir oil field

== Resident diplomatic missions ==
- Belarus has an embassy in Tehran.
- Iran has an embassy in Minsk.

== See also ==
- Foreign relations of Belarus
- Foreign relations of Iran
