= Alexander Pavlovich Voitovich =

Belarusian politician and physicist (born 1938)

- Александр Павлович Войтович; Аляксандр Паўлавіч Вайтовіч
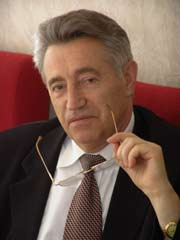
- Voitovich in 2005.

Speaker of the Council of the Republic
- In office 19 December 2000 – 28 July 2003
- President: Alexander Lukashenko
- Prime Minister: Vladimir Yermoshin; Gennady Novitsky
- Preceded by: Pavel Shipuk
- Succeeded by: Gennady Novitsky

President of the National Academy of Sciences of Belarus
- In office 16 May 1997 – 2001
- Preceded by: Leonid Sushchenya
- Succeeded by: Mikhail Myasnikovich

Personal details
- Born: 5 January 1938 (age 88) Rachkevichi, Byelorussian SSR, Soviet Union (now Belarus)
- Occupation: Politician; Physicist
- Scientific career
- Education: Doctor of Sciences
- Alma mater: Belarusian State University
- Known for: Gas lasers
- Political party: Independent
- Thesis: Magneto-optical Effects in Gas Lasers (1979)

Alexander Pavlovich Voitovich (also transliterated as Aleksandr Voitovich; born 5 January 1938) is a Belarusian politician, physicist, and activist. He served as Speaker of the Council of the Republic from 2000 to 2003 and President of the National Academy of Sciences of Belarus from 1997 to 2001.

Voitovich was born in Rachkevichi, which is part of the Kapyl district, in the Byelorussian SSR. He attended the Institute of Physics at the Belarusian State University, graduating in 1978 with a Doctor of Sciences. Afterwards, he continued in the physics field, primarily covering gas lasers and spectroscopy. In May 1997 he was elected President of the Belarusian Academy of Sciences, a position he stayed at until 2001. During his time as president, he helped expand scientific cooperation with state administration and NAS, helped strengthen the international position of NAS, and helped with better organization during a difficult time for the academy because of economic circumstances. In December 2000, upon President Alexander Lukashenko's suggestion Voitovich was appointed Speaker of the Council of the Republic of the second convocation. In this role he met with numerous foreign allies and international organizations, including the IMF and China. However, in 2003, he was suddenly terminated by presidential decree from Lukashenko for declaring a minute of silence in memory of dissident Vasil Bykov. This led him to immediately become part of the Belarusian opposition and an activist.

As part of the opposition, he notably ran as a candidate for the 2006 Belarusian presidential election. Declaring that there was not equal access in the elections and rigged, he also attacked Lukashenko numerous times for running for a third term when the limit was two. Eventually, he withdrew from the elections, and wrote a letter to Prime Minister Sergei Sidorsky asking him to step up, which he did not do. Since the elections, he has led a small laboratory for laser spectroscopy and has been a continuous voice of opposition, comparing the current regime to Nazis and having policies similar to that of Joseph Stalin.

== Early life ==
Alexander Pavlovich Voitovich was born on 5 January 1938 in the village of Rachkevichi, which is part of the Kapyl district, in the Byelorussian SSR. He was born into a peasant family. After graduating with honors from high school, he went to the Faculty of Physics at the Belarusian State University, where he also graduated with honors in 1960. In 1968 he defended his candidate's thesis, and in 1978 he was created a Doctor of Sciences with his doctoral thesis entitled "Magneto-optical Effects in Gas Lasers".

Since 1960 he has worked at the Institute of Physics of the Belarusian Academy of Sciences, where he rose from being a junior researcher to deputy director, actively working the field of laser physics and creating a laser spectroscopy laboratory. In 1980 he became head of the laboratory at the Institute of Physics and from 1948 to 1988 he was the Deputy Director for Scientific Work of the institute. From 1992 to 1933 he was Deputy Director for Research at the Institute of Molecular and Atomic Physics of the Belarusian Academy of Sciences, then director from 1993 to 1997.

=== Scientific work ===
In his work in laser physics, he developed a method for selecting laser frequencies based on saturation parameters, discovered qualitatively new polarization phenomena in gas lasers in a magnetic field, established the role of the processes of forced Resonance Raman spectroscopy in the active medium in the formation of laser characteristics, and identified and studied the phenomena of spontaneous violations of polarization in mirror symmetry in lasers up to obtaining completed chiral purity.

== Political career ==
=== President of the National Academy of Sciences ===
On 16 May 1997, he was elected President of the Belarusian Academy of Sciences by a secret ballot, and was chosen out of 4 candidates. He had previously been elected a corresponding member of the academy in 1986 and a full member in 1996.

He was elected during a difficult time for the academy because of economic circumstances, and soon after Alexander Lukashenko set the task to the task of better organization and increasing its efficiency. In response, Voitovich created a "mini-program" of actions that were approved and then a "maximum program" to set out specific measures for the next 5 years which was approved in April 1998. He also set out to expand interaction with state administration and NAS, which he did through his role as a member of the Council of Ministers. In May 1998 a law was signed that defined the basic principles of interactions between state authorities and NAS, and the salaries of scientific workers were increased by 1.7 times. He also tried to reach out to international authorities to strengthen the position of NAS, visiting UNESCO multiple times.

In December 2000, Voitovich was appointed senator, which meant he had to leave as president of the academy.

=== Speaker of the Council of the Republic ===
On 19 December 2000, at the suggestion of Alexander Lukashenko, he was appointed Speaker of the Council of the Republic of the second convocation.

He worked with the IMF in order to provide an assessment of the transparency of the budget in 2002, after loans were halted by the IMF because of discrepancies. He also visited China, specifically Hubei, from 17-24 January 2002 as part of a delegation in order to celebrate the anniversary of diplomatic relations between the two countries. He met with Li Peng, Hu Jintao, and Qian Qichen. He also called 2001 a landmark year for the Eurasian economic community, helping set up the Eurasian Economic Community.

On 28 July 2003, Lukashenko recalled Voitovich by presidential decree from the post of speaker after Voitovich, on his own, declared a minute of silence in memory of Vasil Bykov. Bykov had been a dissident of Lukashenko and a supporter of the opposition party Belarusian Popular Front, and had died a month before on 22 June. This led him to go to the opposition of the government.

=== Opposition to Lukashenko ===
In 2004, Voitovich said that Lukashenko was running a dictatorship, and that his plan to scrap a term limit of two terms for a president was "totally illegitimate" and was an "egregious violation" in every step of an election. He was also appointed head of the initiative "For Fair Elections" that year.

==== 2006 elections ====
In IISEPS polling, a research center in Belarus, that occurred in December 2005 stated that 7.1% of Belarusians would vote for Voitovich in the next elections.

An initiative group was registered to collect signatures for the nomination of Voitovich as a candidate for the 2006 Belarusian presidential election on 27 December 2005 by Valery Dunaev, which collected 1,304 people, 314 of those signatures were sent to the Central Election Commission of Belarus. On 29 December he released a statement alongside another candidate, Valery Frolov who was a deputy and general, that for the elections to be "constitutional and legal" there must be, among other things, the barring of Lukashenko having a third term, equal access be provided to state media, sealing of early voting ballot boxes be carried out, and have representatives in the election commissions. Otherwise, both threatened to withdraw from the campaign.

On 9 February 2006, he announced that he would not participate in the elections and withdrew, saying that the points in his statement had not been met and that the signatures stated by the election commission were not true and that he had at least 20 - 30 thousand. He further stated that there was already a large-scale campaign for the election of Lukashenko for a new term, which was in violation to the constitution, and said that it was already rigged because Lukashenko repeated statements of an "elegant victory" and "vote for me, where will you go" while authorities complied.

He afterward refused to join the coalition team of Alyaksandr Kazulin, stating that other candidates should not participate because there was no true election. He then wrote a letter to Prime Minister Sergei Sidorsky asking him to make sure the country remains sovereign away from Lukashenko and for him to be head of state. However, Sidorsky never responded and Voitovich said it was a pity that even the opposition let this go.

==== Later career ====
He has worked as the head of a small laboratory for laser spectroscopy at the Institute of Molecular and Atomic Physics at the Academy of Sciences since 2006 alongside four other people. Voitovich has still been an active voice as part of the opposition, talking about the case of Stepan Latypov and comparing the regime to Nazis and Stalin.

In 2010, he was part of the team for Andrei Sannikov, an opposition candidate to Lukashenko.

== Personal life ==
He is married and has a son. He also has three grandchildren, and four great-grandchildren. He said he receives around $500 in rubles each month as his salary, which he considers low for the work in science and stated this is why more young people are not persuaded to go to scientific fields.

== Honours and awards ==
- Order of the Badge of Honour (1981)
- State Prize of Belarus (1996)
- Order of Francysk Skaryna (1998)
- Order of the Commonwealth (CIS; 2002)
