= Aleksei Kushnarenko =

Belarusian politician (born 1975)

- Аляксей Кушнарэнка (Belarusian); Алексей Кушнаренко (Russian)
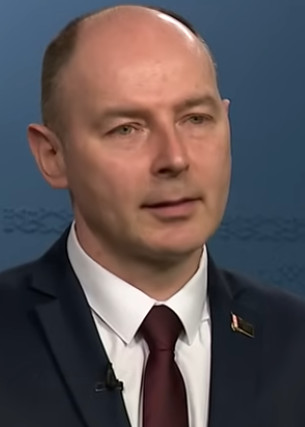
- Kushnarenko in 2025

Governor of the Minsk region
- Incumbent
- Assumed office 31 March 2025
- President: Alexander Lukashenko
- Preceded by: Alexander Turchin

Minister of Energy
- In office 12 August 2024 – 31 March 2025
- President: Alexander Lukashenko
- Prime Minister: Roman Golovchenko; Alexander Turchin
- Preceded by: Viktor Karankevich
- Succeeded by: Denis Moroz

Member of the Council of the Republic
- In office 6 December 2019 – 12 August 2024
- Constituency: Mogilev region

Personal details
- Born: 8 August 1975 (age 51)

Aleksei Ivanovich Kushnarenko (Russian: Алексей Иванович Кушнаренко; Belarusian: Аляксей Іванавіч Кушнарэнка, romanized: Aljaksjej Ivanavič Kušnarenka; born 8 August 1975) is a Belarusian politician serving as governor of the Minsk region since 2025. From 2024 to 2025, he served as minister of energy. From 2019 to 2024, he was a member of the Council of the Republic.
