= Denis Moroz =

Belarusian politician (born 1982)

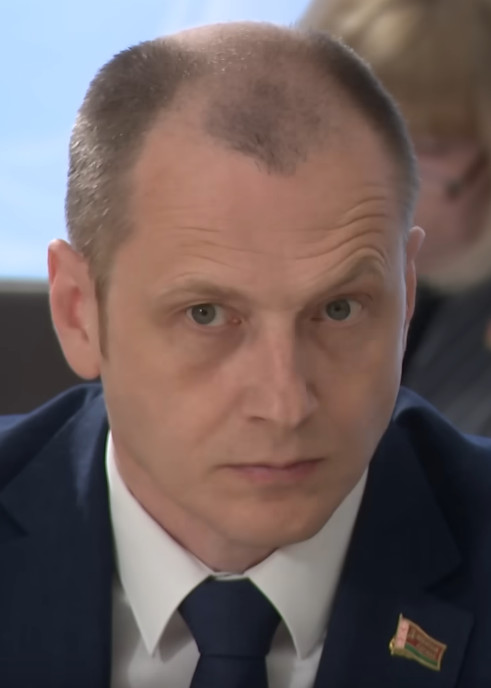
- Moroz in 2025

Minister of Energy
- Incumbent
- Assumed office 31 March 2025
- President: Alexander Lukashenko
- Prime Minister: Alexander Turchin
- Preceded by: Aleksei Kushnarenko

Personal details
- Born: 26 February 1982 (age 44)

Denis Ravilevich Moroz (Russian: Денис Равильевич Мороз; born 26 February 1982) is a Belarusian politician serving as minister of energy since 2025. From 2021 to 2025, he served as deputy minister of energy.
