= Alexander Yefimov (politician) =

Belarusian politician (born 1983)

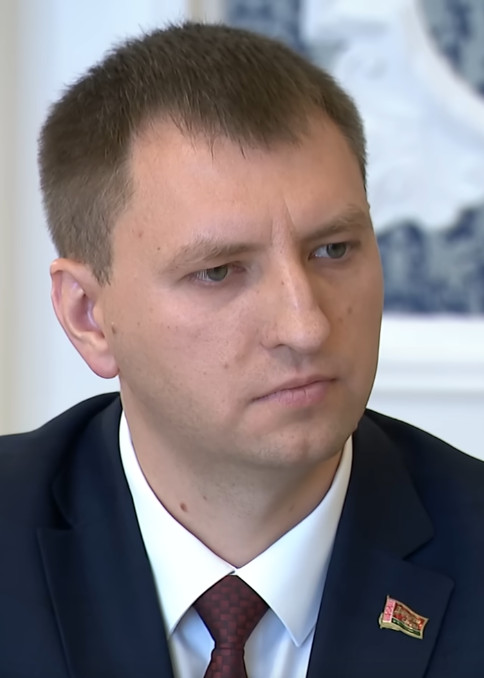
- Yefimov in 2024

Minister of Industry
- Incumbent
- Assumed office 27 June 2024
- President: Alexander Lukashenko
- Prime Minister: Roman Golovchenko; Alexander Turchin
- Preceded by: Alexander Rogozhnik

Personal details
- Born: 18 October 1983 (age 42)

Alexander Vladimirovich Yefimov (Russian: Александр Владимирович Ефимов; born 18 October 1983) is a Belarusian politician serving as minister of industry since 2024. From 2022 to 2024, he served as deputy minister of industry.
