= Pavel Utyupin =

Belarusian politician (born 1976)

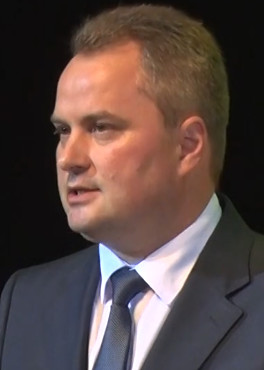
- Utyupin in 2019

Ambassador of the Republic of Belarus to the Republic of Kazakhstan
- In office July 20, 2020 – January 14, 2025
- President: Alexander Lukashenko
- Preceded by: Anatoly Nichkasov
- Succeeded by: Alexey Bogdanov

Minister of Industry
- In office 18 August 2018 – 3 June 2020
- President: Alexander Lukashenko
- Prime Minister: Syarhey Rumas
- Preceded by: Vitaly Vovk
- Succeeded by: Piotr Parkhomchik

Member of the Council of the Republic for Mogilev region
- In office 2008–2012
- President: Alexander Lukashenko

Personal details
- Born: 17 December 1976 (age 49) Khorolsky District, RSFSR, USSR

Pavel Vladimirovich Utyupin (Russian: Павел Владимирович Утюпин; born 17 December 1976) is a Belarusian politician serving as deputy minister of foreign affairs since 2025. From 2020 to 2025, he served as ambassador to Kazakhstan. From 2018 to 2020, he served as minister of industry.
