= Nikolai Snopkov =

Belarusian politician (born 1969)

- Мікалай Снапкоў
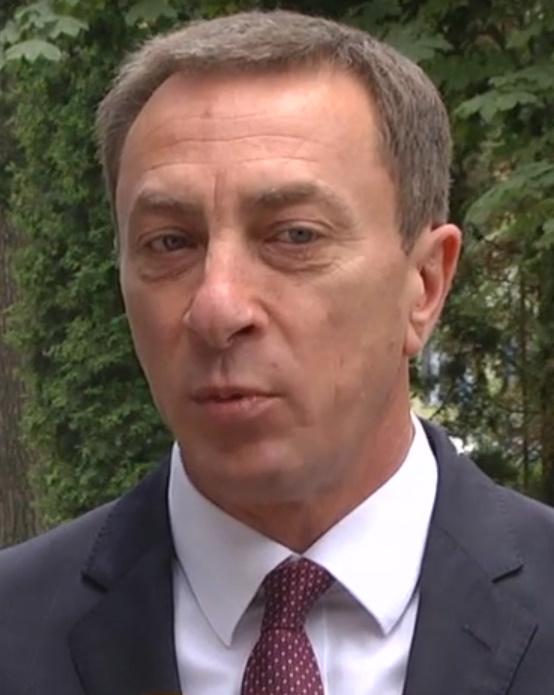
- Snopkov in 2020

First Deputy Prime Minister of Belarus
- Incumbent
- Assumed office 4 June 2020
- President: Alexander Lukashenko
- Prime Minister: Roman Golovchenko; Alexander Turchin
- Preceded by: Dmitry Krutoi

Personal details
- Born: 14 September 1969 (age 56)

Nikolai Gennadievich Snopkov (Russian: Николай Геннадьевич Снопков; born 14 September 1969), or Mikalay Henadzyevich Snapkow (Belarusian: Мікалай Генадзевіч Снапкоў), is a Belarusian politician serving as first deputy prime minister since 2020. From 2009 to 2014, he served as Minister of Economy. He has also served as deputy chairman of the Presidential Administration of Belarus and as the Belarusian ambassador to China.

== Biography ==
Snopkov was born on 14 September 1969. In 1986, he started working as a repair shop worker at the state farm "Trastino" in the Khotsimsky district of Mogilev. He then graduated in 1991 from the Belarusian Agricultural Academy. After graduating from the academy, he worked as an economist at the breeding plant "Lenina", as an economist at a Grodno pig breeding control and testing station, and as a senior economist at the EVSA "Pisarovschchina". From 1992 to 1994 he then worked as an accountant of the districting housing and communal services department for Dribinsky. From 1994 to 1996 he was deputy manager of the Dribinsky branch of Belagroprombank, and then until 2000 was deputy chairman for Economics of the Gorki District Executive Committee in Mogilev. He was then, from 2000 to 2007, Head of the Financial Department of the Mogilev Regional Executive Committee and in late 2007 became Deputy Chairman of the Mogilev Committee.

On 29 December 2009, he was appointed Minister of Economy in a wave of appointments for minister positions by Alexander Lukashenko. One of his first acts was announcing on 1 July 2010 that Belarus intended to ratify and join the Customs Union of the Eurasian Economic Union, after previous struggles to join because of disagreements over oil products and imported cars between Belarus and other members of the union.
