= Yuri Chebotar =

Belarusian politician (born 1979)

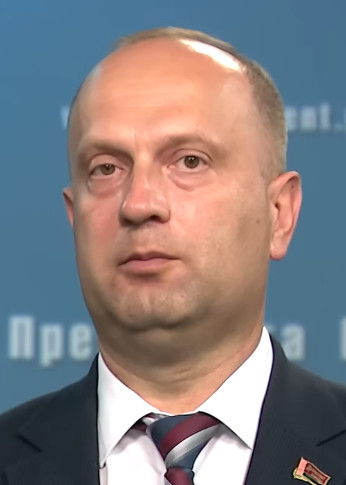
- Chebotar in 2024

Minister of Economy
- Incumbent
- Assumed office 4 January 2024
- President: Alexander Lukashenko
- Prime Minister: Roman Golovchenko; Alexander Turchin
- Preceded by: Aleksandr Chervyakov

Personal details
- Born: 16 November 1979 (age 46)

Yuri Adamovich Chebotar (Russian: Юрий Адамович Чеботарь; born 16 November 1979) is a Belarusian politician serving as minister of economy since 2024. From 2020 to 2024, he served as first deputy minister of economy.
