= Pavel Shipuk =

Belarusian politician (1949-2014)

Pavel Vladimirovich Shipuk
- Па́вел Влади́мирович Шипу́к; Па́вел Уладзі́міравіч Шыпу́к

Speaker of the Council of the Republic
- In office 13 January 1997 – 19 December 2000
- President: Alexander Lukashenko
- Prime Minister: Sergey Ling; Vladimir Yermoshin
- Preceded by: Office established
- Succeeded by: Alexander Pavlovich Voitovich

Chairman of the Gomel Regional Executive Committee
- In office 1994–1997
- Preceded by: Nikolai Grigoryevich Voitenkov
- Succeeded by: Nikolai Grigoryevich Voitenko

Personal details
- Born: 1 May 1949 (age 77) Opol, Byelorussian SSR, Soviet Union (now Belarus)
- Died: 27 May 2014 (aged 65)
- Education: Belarusian National Technical University
- Occupation: Politician

Pavel Vladimirovich Shipuk (1 May 1949 - 27 May 2014) was a Belarusian politician and engineer. His most notable position was as the first Speaker of the Council of the Republic from 1997 to 2000.

Born in Opol in the Byelorussian SSR, Shipuk received a degree in chemical engineering in 1972. He became a long-term worker for the M. V. Lomonosov Glass Factory in Gomel after graduating, rising the ranks until August 1994 when he was appointed president of the newly-renamed workshop Gomelsteklo. Soon after, in 1994, he would enter politics becoming Chairman of the Gomel Regional Executive Committee until 1997 when he was appointed speaker. His tenure as speaker primarily consisted of undergoing international trips to establish the newly created council, meeting with Ukraine, China, and the Parliamentary Assembly of the Council of Europe, among others before his dismissal in 2000. From his dismissal until his death he was a member of the council and Chairman of the Standing Commission on Regional Policy.

== Early life ==
Shipuk was born on 1 May 1949 in Opol, which is part of the Ivanava district, in the Byelorussian SSR. His first job was from 1966 until 1967 as an instructor for the Ivanovo District Committee of the Komsomol. He then obtained a degree from the Belarusian National Technical University in chemical engineering of glass in 1972. After graduating, he first worked at the M. V. Lomonosov Glass Factory in Gomel, first as a shift foreman. He then started rising the ranks in the company, becoming head of glass production, chief engineer, and also received 27 certificates of inventions.

In 1987 he was appointed director of the plant and in 1991 Chairman of the Board, whereupon construction of a new glass workshop began. In August 1994 he was elected president of the new workshop, Gomelsteklo.

== Political career ==
=== Gomel Regional Executive Committee ===
In 1994, Shipuk was appointed Chairman of the Gomel Regional Executive Committee. The regional executive committee during his tenure invested a lot in the construction of the Gomel Miracle for the economy. He left the position, as was required, when he became speaker.

=== Speaker of the Council of the Republic ===
Since 1996 he had been a member of the Council of the Republic, representing Gomel. On 13 January 1997 he was elected Speaker of the Council of the Republic, and was thus the head of the very first convocation.

On 27 July 2000, he met in Belarus with Hu Jintao of China alongside a delegation to discuss how to further the cooperative relations between the two countries. He also met with a Ukrainian delegation led by Leonid Kuchma in 1999 in order to talk about Ukraine's accession to the Union State. Another delegation he met with was from the Parliamentary Assembly of the Council of Europe, which was led by Wolfgang Behrendt, in 1999 for talks about amnesty for political prisoners.

On 19 December 2000, he was dismissed as chairman for the second convocation. Immediately after his departure he stated in press conferences, that he encouraged a policy shift toward privatization and encouraged Western investors to modernize Belarusian firms alongside claling for the privatization of agriculture, which went against Alexander Lukashenko's policies.

=== Later career ===
From 1997 to 2000 he was a senior member of the council, and since 2000 he has been a senior member of the Kamissia of the regional parliament. He was also an Elder of the Interparliamentary Committee of the Belarus, Kazakhstan, Kyrgyzstan, and Russia from 1998 to 2001. Shipuk was also Chairman of the Standing Commission on Regional Policy of the council until his death, and a member of the Presidium of the Council from 2000 to 2004.

== Personal life ==
He was married and had two children.

=== Death ===
Shipuk died on 27 May 2014 at the age of 66.

== Honours and awards ==
On 10 August 2016 a memorial plaque to Shipuk was unveiled at Gomelsteklo.

- Order of the Fatherland III degree (2 July 1997)
- Honorary Professor of the Belarusian State Polytechnical University (1997)
- Academic of the Belarusian Engineering Academy (1997)
- Honorary Professor of the Belarusian National Technical University (2002)
