= First Deputy Prime Minister of Belarus =

First Deputy Prime Minister of Belarus Першы намеснік Прэм'ер-міністра Рэспублікі Беларусь

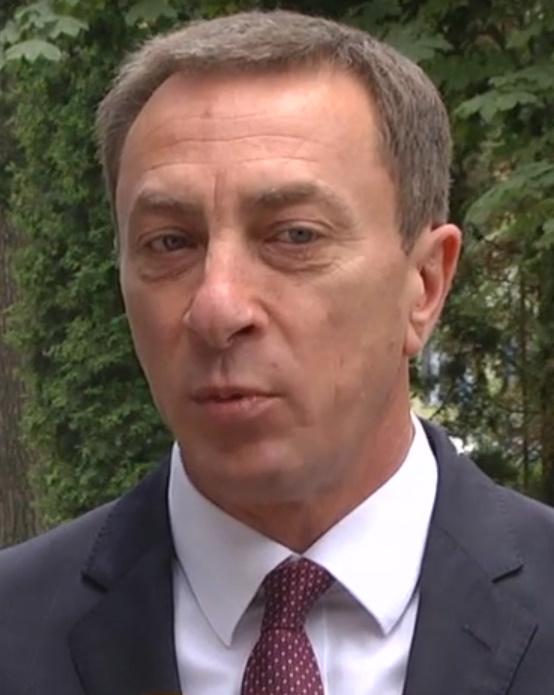
- Incumbent; Nikolai Snopkov since 3 June 2020
- Member of: Council of Ministers
- Seat: Government House, Minsk
- Nominator: Prime Minister
- Appointer: President
- Term length: No fixed term
- Constituting instrument: Constitution of Belarus
- Inaugural holder: Mikhail Myasnikovich (since the independence of Belarus)
- Formation: 1946 (as First Deputy Chairman of Council of Ministers)

The First Deputy Prime Minister of the Republic of Belarus is a government post of the Council of Ministers of Belarus. In the absence of the Prime Minister of Belarus, the first deputy performs his or her duties as the acting prime minister. In 1991, the post was grandfathered from the already existing first deputy chairman that was part of the Council of Ministers of the Byelorussian Soviet Socialist Republic.

In an absence of the first deputy, his or her functions are performed by four other deputy prime ministers who are members of the Council of Ministers of Belarus.

== List of first deputy prime ministers of Belarus ==
No.	Portrait	Name	Took office	Left office	Prime minister(s)	Source
1		Mikhail Myasnikovich	1991	1995	Vyacheslav Kebich; Mikhail Chigir	
2		Pyotr Prakapovich	1996	1998	Sergei Ling	
3		Vasily Dolgolyov	1998	2000	Sergei Ling	
4		Andrei Kobyakov	2000	2001	Vladimir Yermoshin	
5		Sergei Sidorsky	2002	24 December 2003	Gennady Novitsky	
6		Vladimir Semashko	24 December 2003	27 December 2014	Gennady Novitsky; Sergei Sidorsky; Mikhail Myasnikovich	
7		Vasily Matyushevsky	27 December 2014	18 August 2018	Andrei Kobyakov	
8		Alexander Turchin	18 August 2018	3 December 2019	Sergei Rumas	
9		Dmitry Krutoi	3 December 2019	3 June 2020	Sergei Rumas	
10		Nikolai Snopkov	3 June 2020	Incumbent	Roman Golovchenko	
