= Ministry of Economy (Belarus) =

Government ministry of Belarus

Ministry of Economy of the Republic of Belarus
- Міністэрства эканомікі Рэспублікі Беларусь; Министерство экономики Республики Беларусь
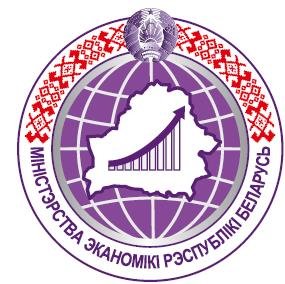
- Emblem of the Ministry

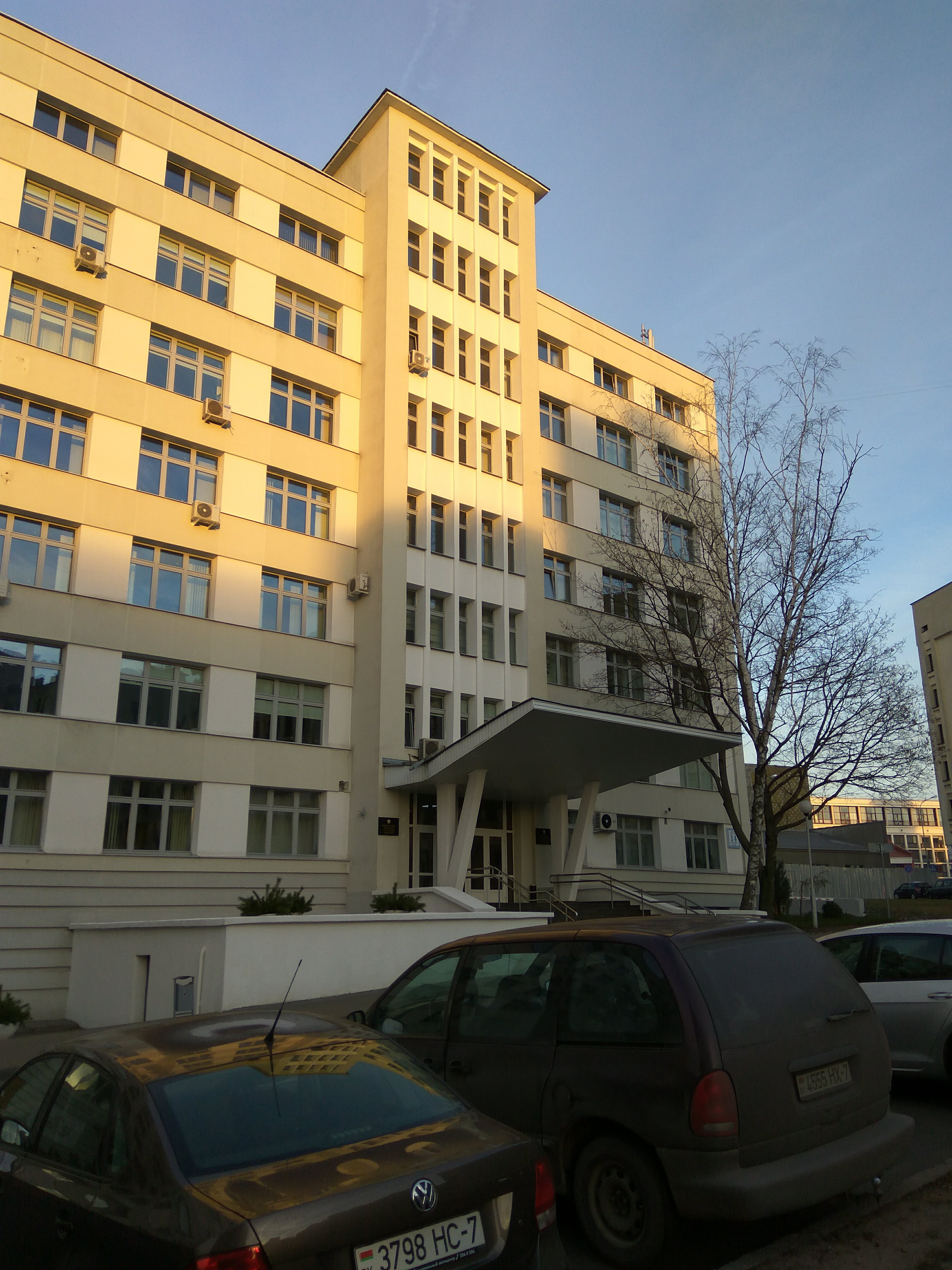
- Ministry headquarters in Minsk

Agency overview
- Jurisdiction: Government of Belarus
- Headquarters: Minsk, Belarus
- Minister responsible: Yuri Chebotar
- Website: https://economy.gov.by/en/

The Ministry of Economy of the Republic of Belarus (Belarusian: Міністэрства эканомікі Рэспублікі Беларусь, romanized: Ministerstva ekanomiki Respubliki Bielaruś; Russian: Министерство экономики Республики Беларусь) or Minekonomiki (Минэкономики) is the Belarusian government ministry which oversees the economic policy of Belarus.

The current Minister of Economy is Yuri Chebotar, since January 4, 2024.

== History ==
The Ministry of Economy was created by the resolution of the Council of Ministers of the Republic of Belarus on March 14, 1994, on the basis of the State Committee of the Republic of Belarus for Economics and Planning of the former Byelorussian Soviet Socialist Republic. On May 24, 1994, the Council of Ministers approved the regulation on the ministry, and on October 6, 1995, it also approved a new regulation. On July 2, 1997, the Council of Ministers adjusted the functions of the ministry, entrusting it with some tasks in the field of energy.

In 2021, in honor of the 100th anniversary of the founding of the Belarusian economic bodies, the emblem and flag of the Ministry of Economy was established, with the corresponding decree on official heraldic symbols being signed by President of Belarus Alexander Lukashenko. A jubilee medal was also established.

== Ministers of Economy ==
- Sergey Ling (April 1994 - March 1995)
- Grigory Badei (March 1995 - August 1996)
- Uladzimir Shymau (November 1996 - June 2002)
- Andrei Kobyakov July 2002 - December 2003
- Nikolai Zaichenko (December 2003 - December 2009)
- Nikolai Snopkov (December 2009 - December 2014)
- Vladimir Zinovsky (December 2014 - August 2018)
- Dmitry Krutoy (August 18, 2018 - November 29, 2019)
- Aleksandr Chervyakov (January 4, 2020 – November 20, 2023)
- Yuri Chebotar (since January 4, 2024)

== Structure ==
The structure of the Ministry as of August 2019:

- Leadership (as of April 2024)
  - Minister - Yuri Chebotar
  - First Deputy Minister - Andrei Kartun
  - Deputy Minister - Alesia Abramenko
  - Deputy Minister - Tatiana Brantsevich
  - Deputy Minister - Vladimir Naumovich
  - Deputy Minister - Maria Mazhinskaya
- Department of Entrepreneurship
- Reorganization and Bankruptcy Department
- Main Directorate of Investment Policy
- Main Department of Macroeconomic Analysis and Forecasting
- Main Department of Methodology and Coordination of State Programs
- Main Department of Regional Development and Property Relations
- Main Directorate for Strategic Development and International Cooperation
- Main Directorate for Sustainable Development
- Main Department of Industrial Economics
- General Directorate of Economic Integration
- Information Technology Department
- Development Infrastructure Department
- Department for Mobilization Preparation of the Economy
- Foreign Trade Forecasting Department
- Department of the Economy of the Social Sphere
- Construction Economics Department
- Department of Economics of Innovation
- Department of International Technical Assistance

The following organizations are also subordinate to the Ministry:

- State Scientific Institution "Research Economic Institute of the Ministry of Economy of the Republic of Belarus"
- Belarusian Fund for Financial Support of Entrepreneurs
- RUE "Information Center of the Ministry of Economy of the Republic of Belarus"
- State Institution "National Agency for Investments and Privatization"
- Territorial Reorganization and Bankruptcy Authorities
