= Uladzimir Shymau =

Belarusian politician (1948–2026)

- Уладзімір Шымаў

Minister of Economy
- In office November 1996 – June 2002
- Preceded by: Georgy Badzei
- Succeeded by: Andrei Kobyakov

Personal details
- Born: 29 November 1948 Radolivka, Zaporizhzhia Oblast, Ukrainian SSR, Soviet Union
- Died: 3 August 2026 (aged 77)
- Education: Moscow State University (DS)
- Occupation: Economist

Uladzimir Mikalayevich Shymau (Belarusian: Уладзімір Мікалаевіч Шымаў; 29 November 1948 – 3 August 2026) was a Belarusian politician. He served as Minister of Economy from 1996 to 2002.

Shymau died on 3 August 2026, at the age of 77.
