= Piotr Parkhomchik =

Belarusian politician (born 1957)

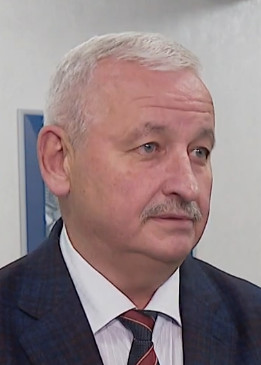
- Piotr Parkhomchik in 2020

Governor of the Brest Region
- Incumbent
- Assumed office 12 August 2024
- President: Alexander Lukashenko
- Preceded by: Yuri Shuleiko

Deputy Prime Minister
- In office 16 August 2022 – 12 August 2024
- President: Alexander Lukashenko
- Prime Minister: Roman Golovchenko
- Preceded by: Yuri Nazarov
- Succeeded by: Viktor Karankevich

Minister of Industry
- In office 4 June 2020 – 15 August 2022
- President: Alexander Lukashenko
- Prime Minister: Roman Golovchenko
- Preceded by: Pavel Utyupin
- Succeeded by: Alexander Rogozhnik

Personal details
- Born: 22 August 1957 (age 69) Minsk, Belarusian SSR, USSR
- Education: Belarus State Economic University

Piotr Aleksandrovich Parkhomchik (Russian: Пётр Александрович Пархомчик; born 22 August 1957) is a Belarusian politician serving as governor of the Brest Region since 2024. From 2022 to 2024, he served as deputy prime minister. From 2020 to 2022, he served as minister of industry.

Piotr Parkhomchik graduated from the Belarus State Economic University and the Presidential Academy of Public Administration.

== Personal life ==
He is married and has two children.
