= Belarus–China relations =

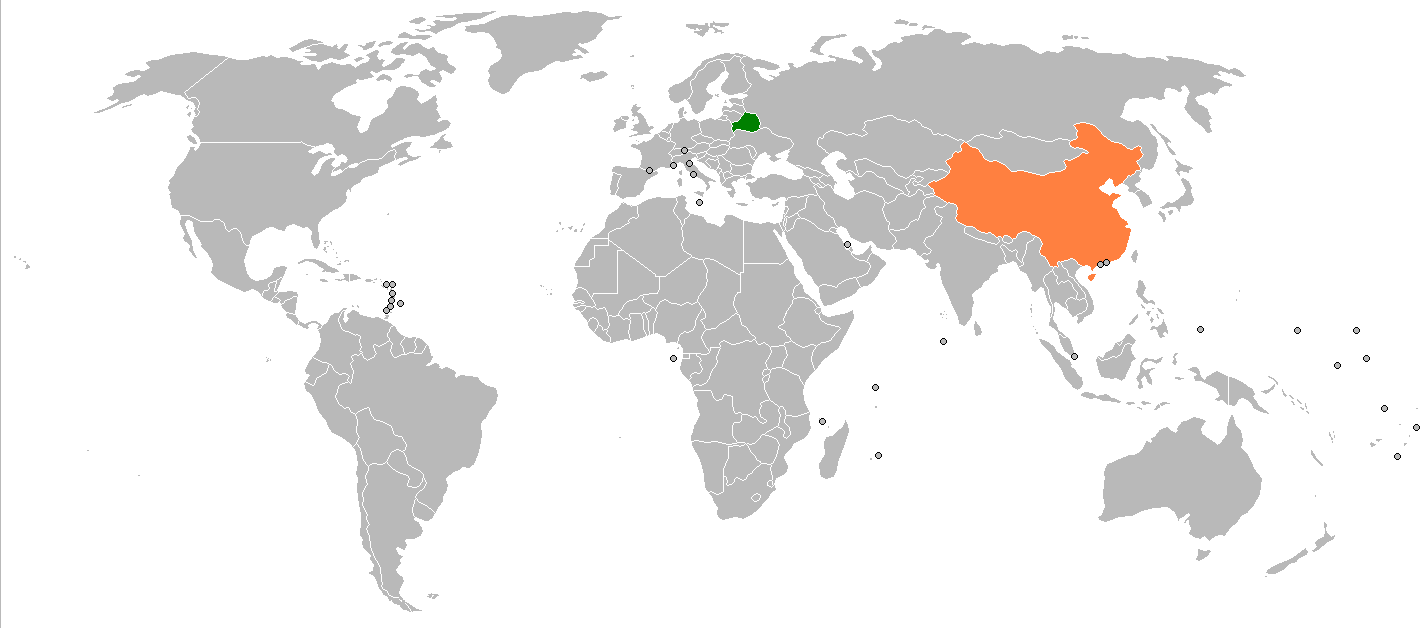

- Belarus: China

Diplomatic mission
- Belarusian Embassy, Beijing: Chinese Embassy, Minsk

Relations between Belarus and the People's Republic of China have been generally positive, with Belarusian President Alexander Lukashenko advocating that Belarus should take an approach of "understanding China, learning from China, and approaching China."

== History ==
The Byelorussian Soviet Socialist Republic, then part of the Soviet Union, recognized the PRC on 2 October 1949.

Belarus became an independent country in 1991 following the dissolution of the Soviet Union. Lukashenko was elected President of Belarus on July 20, 1994, and has been re-elected since. From early in his presidency, Lukashenko has advocated that Belarus should adopt an approach of "understanding China, learning from China, and approaching China." Lukashenko visited China several times between 1995 and 2019, seeking to develop diplomatic and economic ties.

In 2011, the two countries agreed to construct an industrial park in Belarus. After Chinese President Xi Jinping's announcement of the Belt and Road Initiative (BRI) in 2013, Belarus responded positively and sought to combine the benefits of the Chinese initiative with its own national integration and public docking priorities. Under the auspices of the BRI, construction of the China–Belarus Industrial Park began in 2014. It is now the largest industrial park built pursuant to the BRI and serves as a major channel for Chinese goods to enter Europe.

Belarus plays an essential role in the Digital Silk Road. Even in the era of Western sanctions on this country, China continues cooperating in high-tech and innovation development with this post-Soviet Eurasia state.

In July 2015, Belarus became an observer in the Shanghai Cooperation Organisation (SCO). Trade relations between the two countries have grown. In particular, Belarus markets agricultural and food products to China, where they have significant popularity.

Belarus was one of 53 countries that in June 2020 supported China's Hong Kong national security law at the United Nations Human Rights Council.

At the 2022 China–Belarus summit, the countries agreed to form an all-weather comprehensive strategic partnership. Lukashenko traveled to Beijing for the 2023 Belarus–China Summit, during which the countries agreed to create a free trade zone in Belarus in 2023. On March 1, 2023, Lukashenko and Xi jointly called for the "soonest possible" peace deal in the Russian invasion of Ukraine, stating their "deep concern about the development of the armed conflict in the European region and extreme interest in the soonest possible establishment of peace in Ukraine".

In July 2024, Belarus became a full member in the SCO. The same month, the People's Liberation Army and the Armed Forces of Belarus conducted joint military exercises a few kilometers from the Belarus–Poland border.

== Political stances ==
Belarus follows the one China principle, and recognizes the government of the People's Republic of China as the sole legal government representing the whole of China and Taiwan as "an inalienable part" of China. Belarus supports all efforts by the PRC to "achieve national reunification" and opposes Taiwan independence. It also supports China's position on its "core interests" and its policies in Hong Kong, Tibet and Xinjiang, as well as the South China Sea.

== See also ==
- Foreign relations of Belarus
- Foreign relations of China
