= 2024 Belarusian Council of the Republic election =

- 4 April 2024

56 out of 64 seats in Council of the Republic
	Majority party	Minority party	Third party
Party	Belaya Rus	CPB	Independents
Seats won	16	1	39
Speaker before election
Natalya Kochanova
Elected Speaker
Natalya Kochanova

The indirect election to the Council of the Republic of Belarus were held on 4 April 2024.

== Electoral system ==
The Council consists of 64 members, and the representation is based geographically; most of the elected members come from civil society organizations, labour collectives and public associations in their jurisdiction. Each of the six oblasts and the capital city of Minsk are represented by eight members, and an additional eight members are appointed by the president.

== Results ==
Overall, 38 men and 18 women were elected to the council, and 15 of the elected members served during previous convocations.

Party	Seats
Party	Seats won
Belaya Rus	16
Communist Party of Belarus	1
Independents	39
Nominated members	8
Total	64
