= Viktor Karankevich =

Belarusian politician (born 1976)

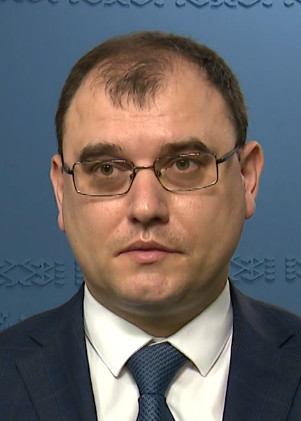
- Viktor Karankevich in 2020

Deputy Prime Minister
- Incumbent
- Assumed office 12 August 2024
- President: Alexander Lukashenko
- Prime Minister: Roman Golovchenko
- Preceded by: Piotr Parkhomchik

Minister of Energy
- In office 31 August 2018 – 12 August 2024
- President: Alexander Lukashenko
- Prime Minister: Syarhey Rumas; Roman Golovchenko
- Preceded by: Vladimir Potupchik
- Succeeded by: Aleksei Kushnarenko

Personal details
- Born: 1 August 1976 (age 49) Kirawsk, Mogilev region, Byelorussian SSR, Soviet Union

Viktor Mikhailovich Karankevich (Russian: Виктор Михайлович Каранкевич; born 1 August 1976) is a Belarusian politician serving as deputy prime minister since 2024. From 2018 to 2024, he served as minister of energy.
