= Alexander Rogozhnik =

Belarusian politician (born 1976)

- Аляксандар Рагожнік
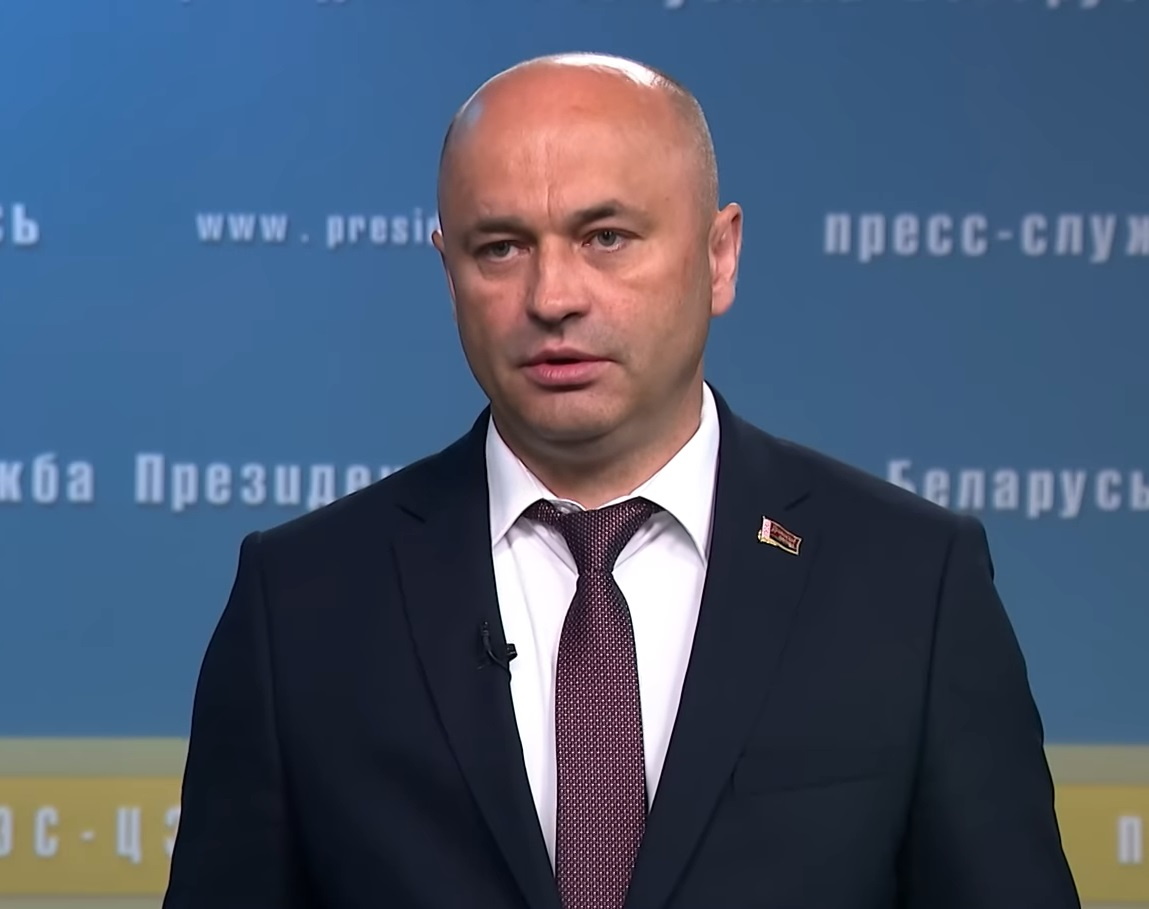
- Rogozhnik in 2024

Ambassador of Belarus to Russia
- Incumbent
- Assumed office 5 November 2024
- President: Alexander Lukashenko
- Preceded by: Dmitry Krutoi

Minister of Industry
- In office 3 October 2022 – 27 June 2024
- President: Alexander Lukashenko
- Prime Minister: Roman Golovchenko
- Preceded by: Piotr Parkhomchik
- Succeeded by: Alexander Yefimov

Personal details
- Born: 11 June 1976 (age 49)

Alexander Nikolaevich Rogozhnik (Russian: Александр Николаевич Рогожник, Belarusian: Аляксандр Мікалаевіч Рагожнік; born 11 June 1976) is a Belarusian politician serving as ambassador to Russia since 2024. From 2022 to 2024, he served as minister of industry.
