= China–Belarus Industrial Park =

Special economic zone in Belarus

Coordinates: 53°54′14″N 27°58′40″E

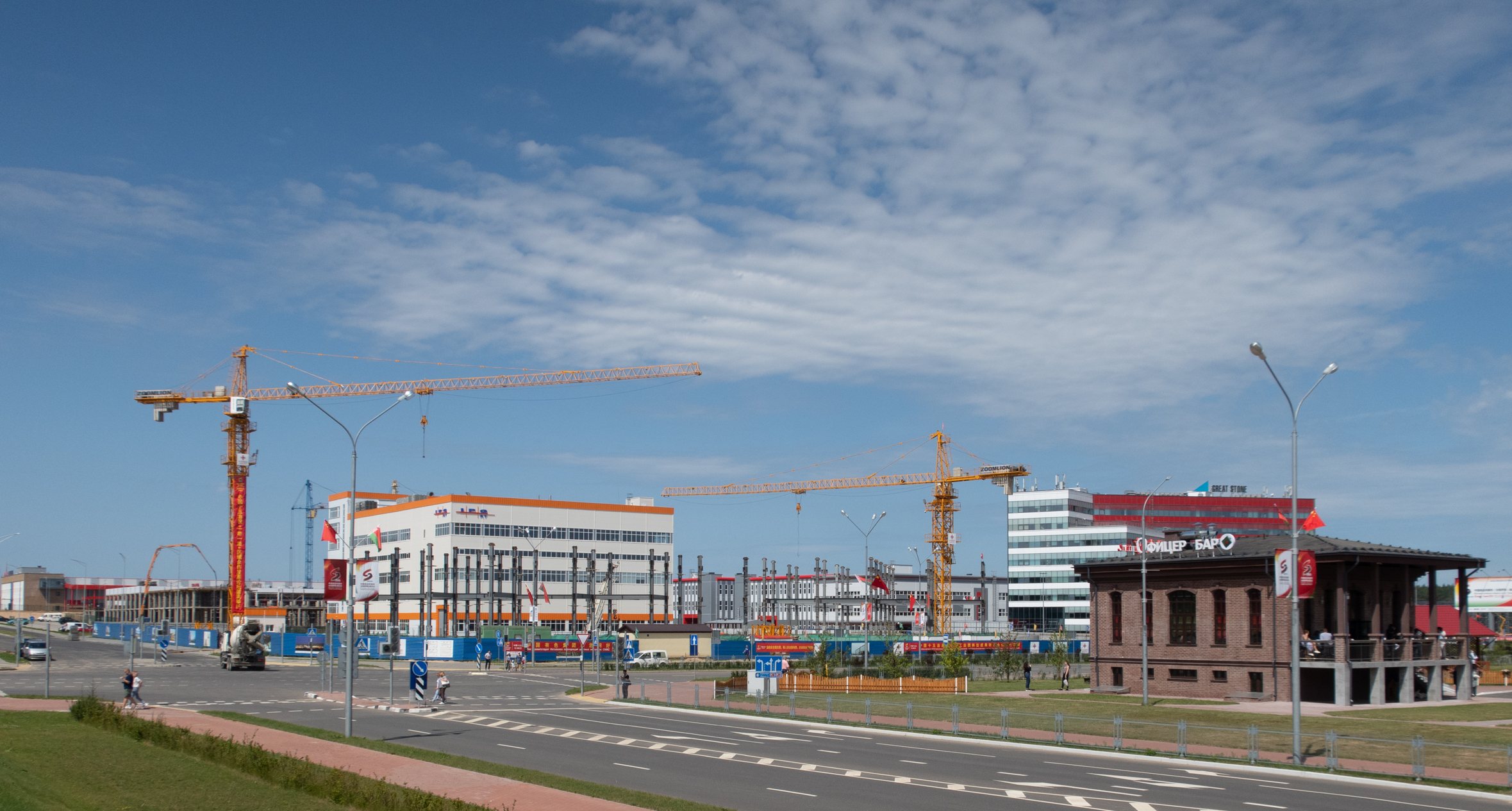
General view (2019)

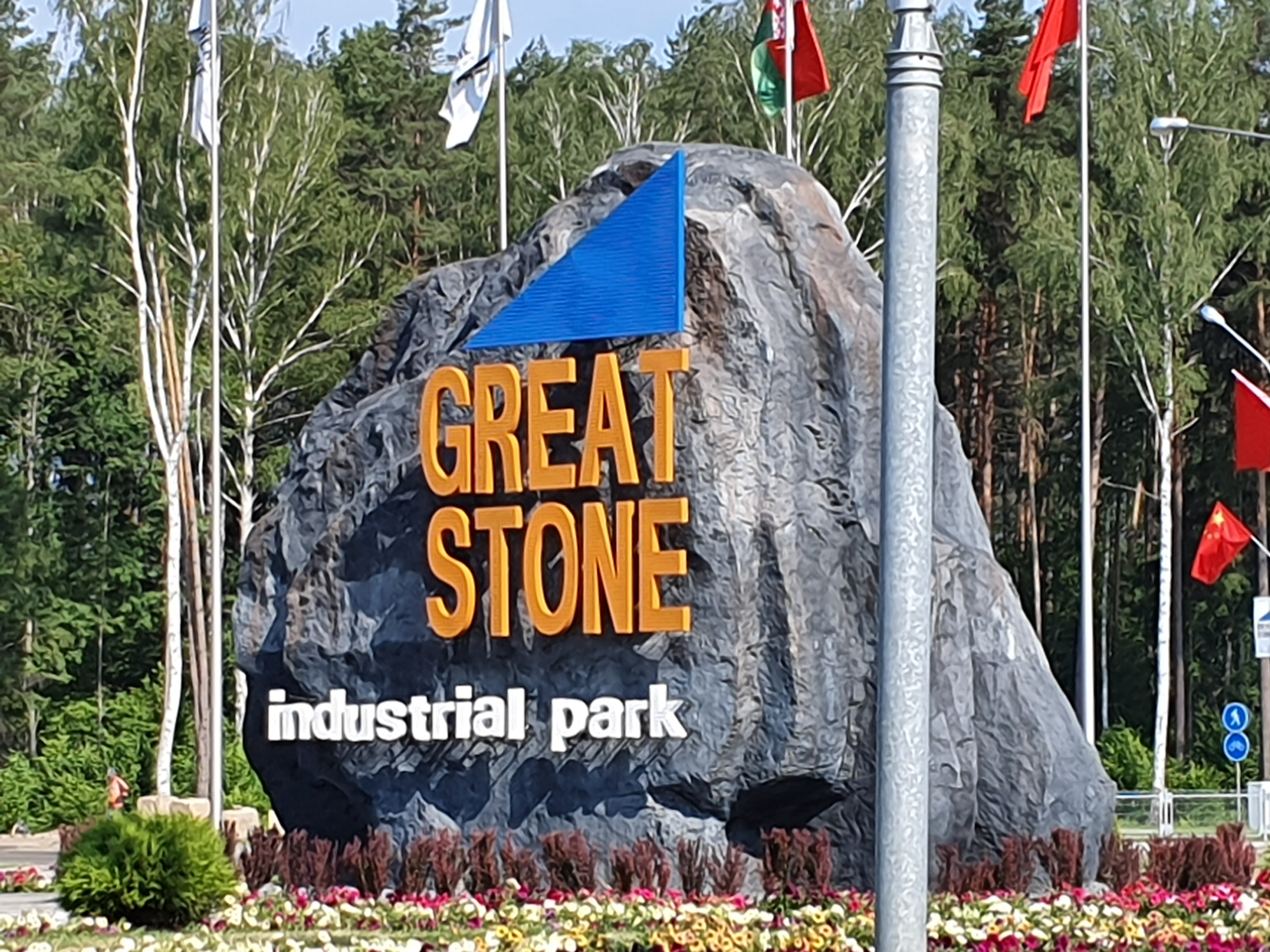
Memorial stone

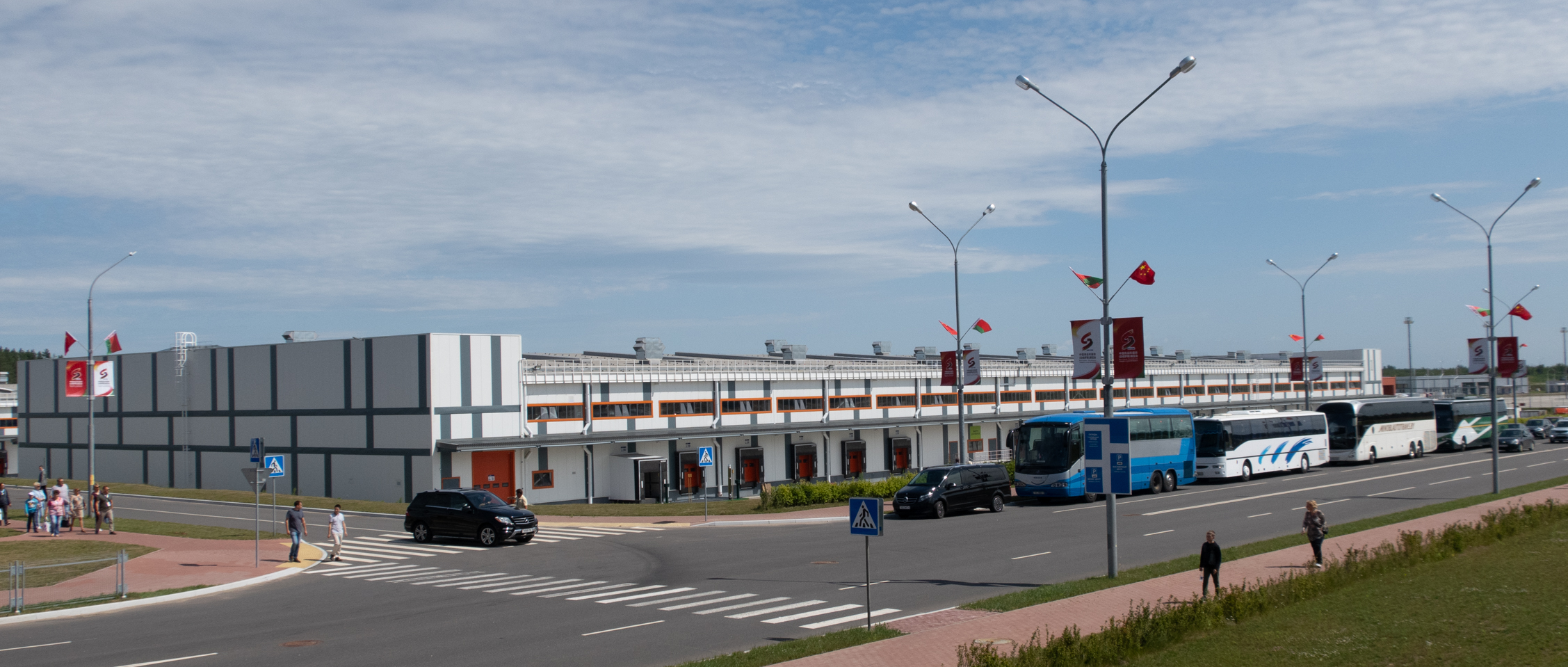
Logistic zone of the park

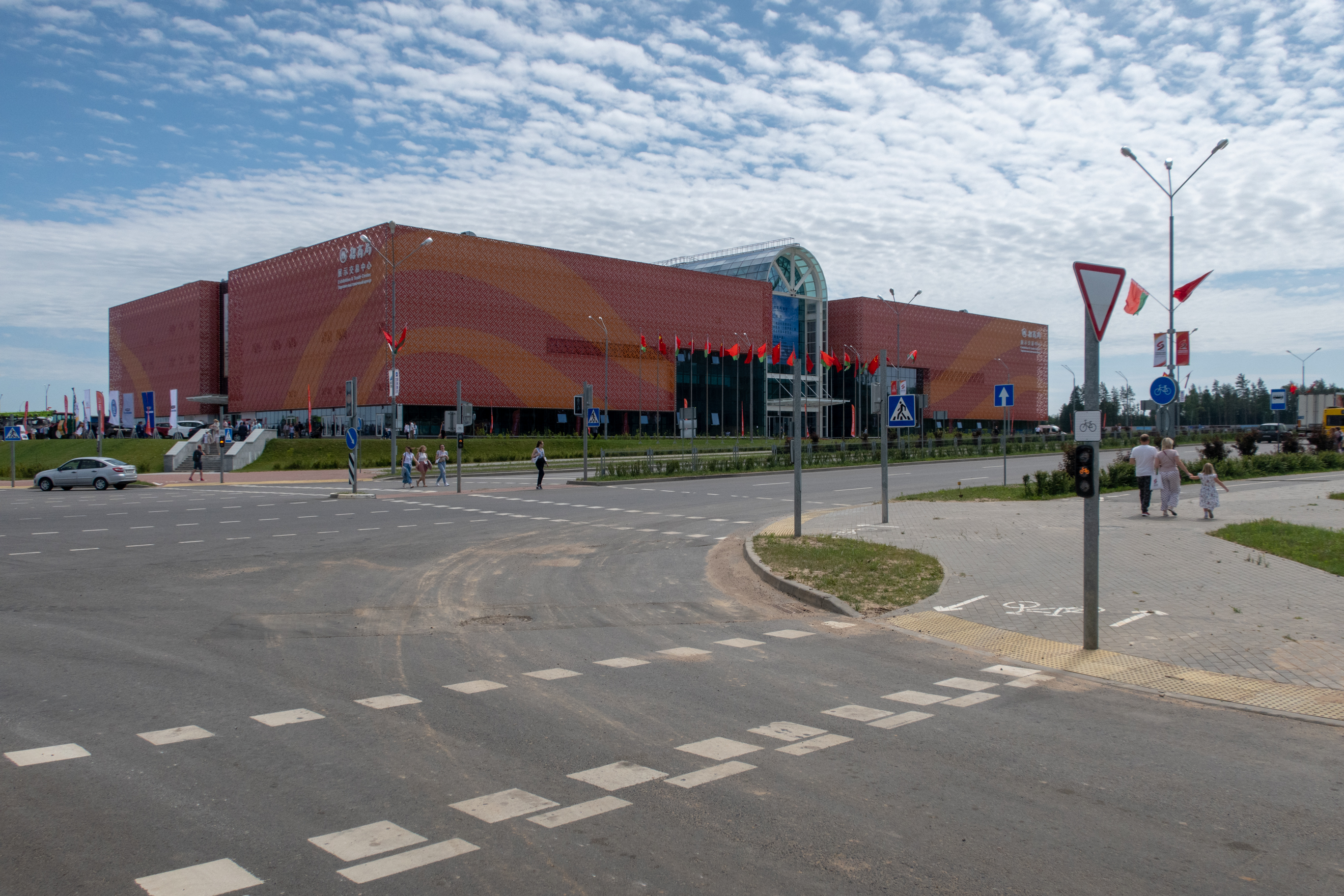
Trade and exhibition center

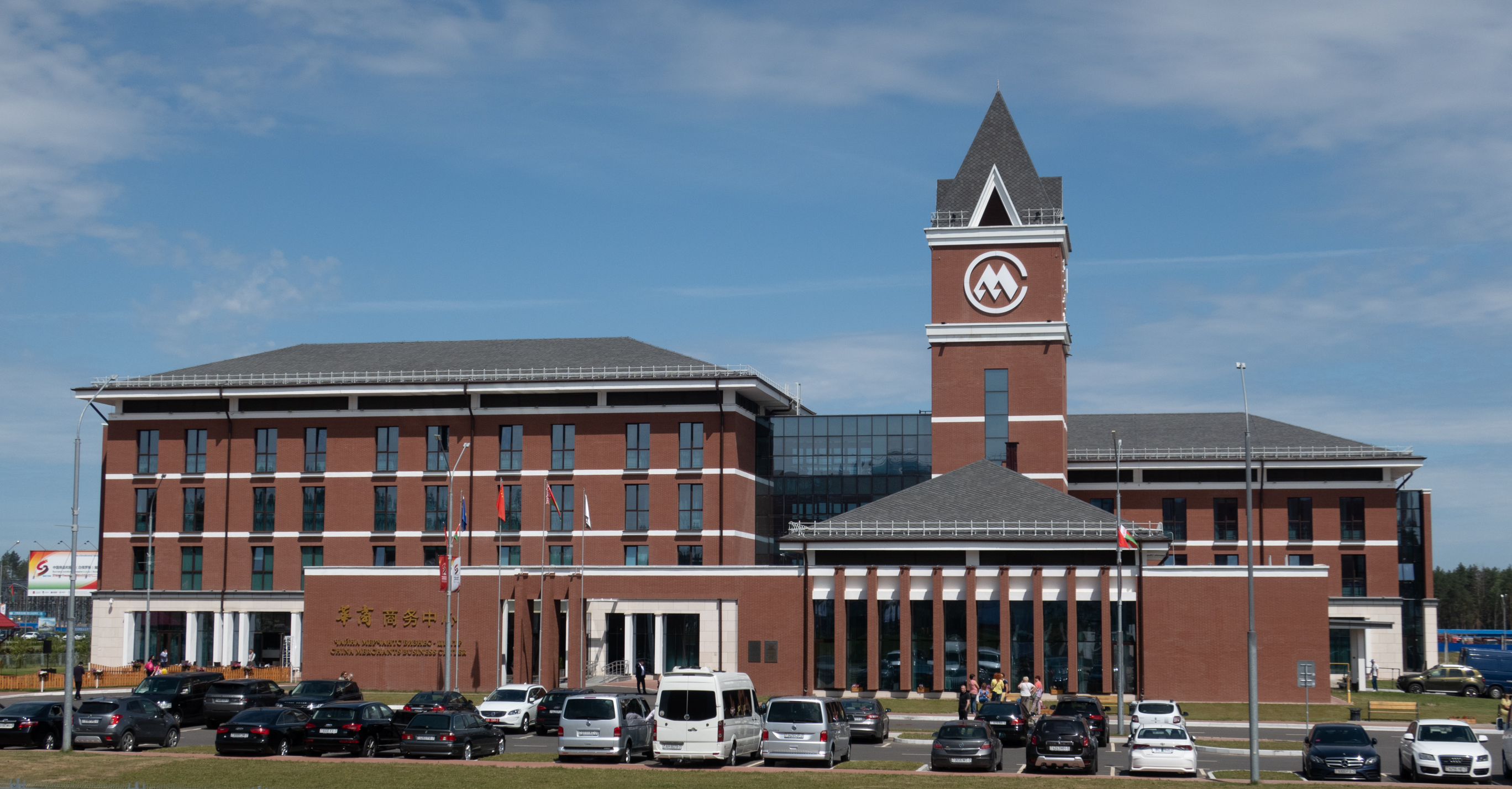
China Merchants business center

The China–Belarus Industrial Park "Great Stone" (Belarusian: Кітайска-беларускі індустрыяльны парк «Вялікі камень», Russian: Китайско-Белорусский индустриальный парк «Великий камень», Chinese: 中国-白俄罗斯工业园) is a special economic zone in Belarus, established under the intergovernmental agreement between the People's Republic of China and the Republic of Belarus. The park offers easy access to International Highways M1/E30 and M4, International Airport (included into the Park territory), International Railways and the capital of Belarus (Minsk) with its labour and scientific potential. Great Stone Industrial Park is designated for high-tech industrial and business activities, including research and development, manufacturing and assembly, warehousing and logistic facilities. Park tax benefits, free customs regime within the countries of the Eurasian Economic Union (EAEU), including Russia and Kazakhstan, open market opportunities for 183 million customers.

== History ==
The China–Singapore Suzhou Industrial Park has become the prototype of the Great Stone Industrial Park. In 2010, the Ministry of Economy of the Republic of Belarus and the "Chinese Engineering Corporation CAMC (CAMCE)" agreed to cooperate on the creation of China–Belarus Industrial Park in the territory of Belarus. In November 2011, it was also discussed at the meeting of the China-Belarus intergovernmental commission. For the initial creation of the park the following documents were signed:

- Cooperation agreement on the establishment of the China–Belarus Industrial Park in the territory of the Republic of Belarus between the Ministry of Economy of the Republic of Belarus and the "China Engineering Corporation CAMC (CAMCE)", dated October 11, 2010.
- Agreement between the Government of the Republic of Belarus and the Government of the People’s Republic of China on the participatory development of the China–Belarus Industrial Park, dated September 18, 2011 (ratified by both countries and entered into effect on January 30, 2012).
- Decree of the President of the Republic of Belarus No. 253 «On the China–Belarus Great Stone Industrial Park», dated June 5, 2012 .

Documents to establish a joint venture for Park development were signed in Minsk on August 27, 2012. As a result, Industrial Park Development Company, CJSC (IPDC) was established. The company was incorporated with an authorised capital of $10 million. In April 2013, Park presentations were held in such Chinese cities as Harbin and Guangzhou. On June 4, 2013, the Government of Belarus approved the Master plan (Resolution number 447). In July 2013, Harbin governmental delegation visited Minsk to negotiate participation in the capital of the development company. Minister of the Economy Nikolai Snopkov took part in the meeting. A group of businessmen from the southern Chinese province of Guangdong also declared their intention to participate in the project development.

On May 12, 2017, new Decree of the President of the Republic of Belarus "On the improvement of the special legal regime of the China-Belarus Great Stone Industrial Park" was signed. It created unique legal and regulatory environment for Industrial Park residents and investors.

== Description ==
Great Stone Industrial Park is a territorial unit of Belarus with the status of special economic zone and special regime for doing business.

The Park is located 25 km from Minsk in the Smolevichi district between the Petrovichi reservoir and Minsk National Airport (MSQ) with total area of 112 km^{2}.

The Park is focused on manufacturing with high export potential. Currently, Park development is based on high-tech manufactures in the spheres of mechanical engineering, electronics & telecommunication, fine chemistry, biotechnology, pharmaceuticals, new materials, logistics, e-commerce, big data and more.

This area has a special legal regime and incentives unique not only for Belarus, but also for EAEU. For instance, company-resident is free from tax on profit for 10 years since first profit is generated. Then 50% discount from the existing rate for up to 2062. The companies are free from land tax and real estate tax. Income tax for Park employees is 9% compared to 13% for the rest of the country. Residents are also exempted from customs duties and VAT when importing equipment for project implementation. Grandfather clause provides companies with investment protection for 10 years. An investor can get land plots on the Park territory for up to 99 years or take it into a private ownership.

At the very beginning, logistics were an important part of the Park. The project on the construction of logistic sub-park is being implemented by the largest owner of ports and vessels in the world - China Merchants Group. Nevertheless, Great Stone is not only industrial and logistic area. It is going to be eco-city with comfortable living conditions for up to 150,000 citizens. Later on, kindergartens, schools, hospitals, shopping malls, sport and recreation centers will be built.

According to the British newspaper The Financial Times, Belarus plans to attract foreign investors into the project «through tax incentives, liberal laws regarding foreign ownership and a well-educated labour force».

China–Belarus Industrial Park is the largest industrial park in Europe among the parks established by China.

== Economy ==
Belarus plans to invest more than $500 million, and Bank of China - more than $1.5 billion into the Park infrastructure.

The estimated amount of direct investment to the project will be up to $2 billion. As China Embassy forecasted, it may be increased up to $5.5 billion.

In the long run, the project might accumulate up to $30 billion investment. According to Alexander Lukashenko, the park will help to increase export potential for up to $50 billion annually.

The development of the Park is also focused on creating financing opportunities. In July 2019 the "club of investors" estimated for US$20 million has been created. Innovative start-ups or small business companies may be financed through special project selection program “Iskra”.

== Governance ==
The geographical position of the China–Belarus Industrial Park (brown dot in the middle). EU is shown in green, China in red

Great Stone Industrial Park has three level management structure: 1.Intergovernmental coordination council; 2. Great Stone Industrial Park Administration; 3. Great Stone Industrial Park Development Company.

Park Administration is responsible for any administrative procedures in the Park territory and registration of residents. One of the biggest advantages of Great Stone is related to “one-stop service” opportunities. If required, resident may apply to single authority – Park Administration – for any administrative procedure, such as company registration, licensing, construction permits, etc. If requested by the Park Administration, any public authority shall arrive at the park territory in order to support residents.

Industrial Park Development Company is responsible for construction of infrastructure, land plot allotment and attraction of investors. Moreover, it provides investors services on water, gas, electricity, internet supply and other facilities. Thus, created management structure makes it easier for foreign investors to adapt to new area, protect their rights and simplify any administrative procedures. Detailed explanation can be found in the Decree of the President of the Republic of Belarus No 166 of 12.05.2017

== Residents ==
There are 56 companies that are registered as Great Stone Industrial Park residents. Among them you can find the following companies:

- Huawei Technologies Co. Ltd. is a Chinese multinational technology company that provides telecommunications equipment and sells electronics, including smartphones.
- China Merchants Group is a state-owned corporation of China, the largest owner of ports and vessels in the world. It implements the project on the construction of logistic sub-park in the Great Stone territory.
- Kronospan manufactures wood-based panels created by electronic printing on paper and plastic base.
- IPG Photonics is a manufacturer of optomechanical components, electronic assemblies and laser equipment based on them.
- Composite structures are developing project in the field of composite materials based on Dieffenbacher technology.
- Innoviz Technologies is a leading manufacturer of solid-state LiDAR sensors and perception software.

== Criticism ==
The project was criticised in Belarus. Main conflict referred to possible demolition of property, negative environmental impact and limited access to natural resources in Smolevichi district, Minsk region.

One of the leaders of the protest campaign, Andrey Dmitriev, noted that they succeeded in getting guarantees of property protection. Former Head of investment department in the Ministry of Economy, Kirill Koroteev, said that the land plots will not be confiscated without the consent of the land owner. Koroteev also noted that 498 hectares of the territory will be reserved for green space and the industrial zone will only occupy up to 10% of the whole territory. According to his statement, the suggestions made during the public debate were taken into consideration. In particular, there will not be any polluting industries in Great Stone.

In response to criticism of the project, Alexander Lukashenko said: "There is no need to shout out that there won’t be enough land or something similar. Everyone will get everything. We will not infringe on or offend our people. If someone feels uncomfortable locating nearby the park, we will provide land for that person with better conditions, so as not to offend".

Alexander Lukashenko has called China–Belarus Industrial Park the country’s most important joint project. He also mentioned, the project may eliminate financial instability in Belarus, and will help the country to make a technological leap.

A columnist for the «Belarusian News», Nikita Belyaev, notes that this project may provoke a conflict between Belarus and Russia, because, in his opinion, Moscow is not interested in reducing the dependence of Belarus on the Russian economy.

According to Lenta.ru, the industrial park is «the most ambitious project within the Minsk–Beijing cooperation».

According to Zhang Zhenzun, senior vice president of the Chinese ZTE Corporation, "the project has good potential for the development of high-tech industries".

== See also ==
- Economy of Belarus
- Belarus High Technologies Park
