= Vasily Matyushevsky =

Belarusian banker and politician (born 1969)

- Васіль Мацюшэўскі (Belarusian); Василий Матюшевский (Russian)

First Deputy Prime Minister
- In office 27 January 2014 – 18 August 2018
- President: Alexander Lukashenko
- Prime Minister: Andrei Kobyakov
- Preceded by: Vladimir Semashko
- Succeeded by: Alexander Turchin

Personal details
- Born: 26 March 1969 (age 57)

Vasily Stanislavovich Matyushevsky (Russian: Василий Станиславович Матюшевский; Belarusian: Васіль Станіслававіч Мацюшэўскі, romanized: Vasil Stanisłavavič Macjušeŭski; born 26 March 1969) is a Belarusian banker and politician serving as chairman of BelVEB since 2018. From 2014 to 2018, he served as first deputy prime minister. From 2010 to 2014, he served as chairman of Sberbank.

Vasily Matyushevsky serves as the Honorary Consul of Oman in the Republic of Belarus.
