= Gennady Novitsky =

5th Prime Minister of Belarus 2001–2003

- Гена́дзь Наві́цкі; Генна́дий Нови́цкий

5th Prime Minister of Belarus
- In office 1 October 2001 – 11 July 2004
- President: Alexander Lukashenko
- Preceded by: Vladimir Yermoshin
- Succeeded by: Sergei Sidorsky

Deputy Prime Minister of Belarus
- In office 1997 – 1 October 2001 Serving with Pyotr Prakapovich, Vasily Dolgolyov and Andrei Kobyakov
- Prime Minister: Sergey Ling; Vladimir Yermoshin
- Preceded by: Pyotr Prakapovich
- Succeeded by: Sergei Sidorsky

Personal details
- Born: 2 January 1949 (age 77) Mogilev, Byelorussian SSR, Soviet Union (now Belarus)
- Party: Independent

Gennady Vasilievich Novitsky (Note: Belarusian: Гена́дзь Васі́левіч Наві́цкі, romanized: Hienádz Vasilevič Navicki, [ʝeˈnadzʲ naˈvʲitsci]; Russian: Генна́дий Васи́льевич Нови́цкий, romanized: Gennadij Vasiljevič Novickij) (born January 2, 1949) is a Belarusian politician, born in Mogilev.

He was a Deputy Prime Minister from 1997 to 2001. He has held various positions including the position as the 5th Prime Minister of Republic of Belarus under the Presidency of Alexander Lukashenko. He held this position from October 2001 until Sergei Sidorsky's appointment in July 2003.

More recently, Novitsky held the post of speaker of Council of the Republic of Belarus.

== See also ==
- Politics of Belarus

== Notes ==
Political offices
Preceded by Vladimir Yermoshin	Prime Minister of Belarus; 2001–2004	Succeeded by Sergei Sidorsky
Preceded by Alyaksandr Vaytovich	Speaker of the Council of the Republic; 2004–2008	Succeeded by Boris Batura
