= Council of the Republic (Belarus) =

Upper house of the National Assembly of Belarus

Coordinates: 53°53′46″N 27°32′41.2″E

Council of the Republic of the National Assembly of the Republic of Belarus Савет Рэспублікі Нацыянальнага сходу Рэспублікі Беларусі Совет Республики Национального собрания Республики Беларусь
- 8th Council of the Republic of Belarus

Type
- Type: Upper house of the National Assembly of Belarus

History
- Founded: 1996
- Preceded by: Supreme Council of Belarus

Leadership
- Speaker: Natalya Kochanova, Belaya Rus since 6 December 2019
- Deputy Speaker: Sergei Khomenko, Belaya Rus since 11 April 2024

Structure
- Seats: 64
- Political groups: Government (64): Belaya Rus (16); Communist Party (1); Independent (47)

Elections
- Voting system: Indirect election
- First election: 6 January 1997
- Last election: 4 April 2024

Meeting place
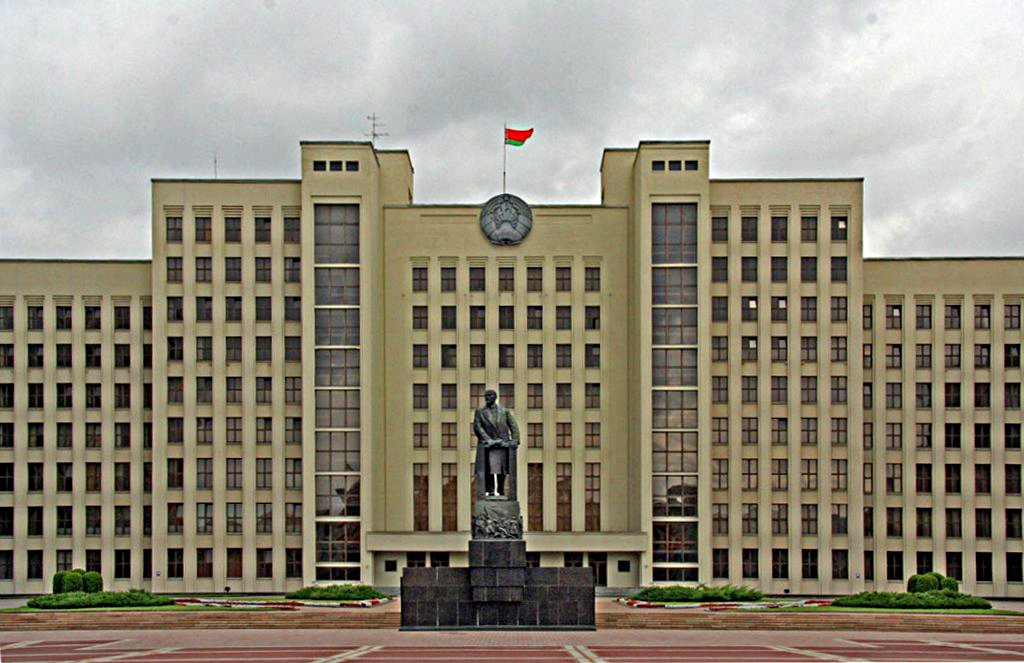
- Government House, Minsk

Website
- http://www.sovrep.gov.by/

The Council of the Republic of the National Assembly of the Republic of Belarus (Belarusian: Савет Рэспублікі Нацыянальнага сходу Рэспублікі Беларусь, romanized: Saviet Respubliki Nacyjanaĺnaha schodu Respubliki Bielaruś; Russian: Совет Республики Национального собрания Республики Беларусь) is the upper house of the parliament of Belarus.

== History ==
It was established after the Constitution of Belarus was amended in 1996 following a referendum, replacing the Supreme Council of Belarus.

== Composition ==
=== Qualifications ===
To be elected to the Council, an individual must be at least 30 years of age, a citizen of the republic and of no other country, have residency in an oblast or the Minsk City for at least 5 years, and have no criminal record.

=== Election ===
The Council consists of 64 members, and the representation is based geographically, with each oblast (six) and the city of Minsk (the national capital) represented by eight members, and an additional eight members are appointed to the Council via presidential quota. Elections are indirect, with members being elected by the deputies of the popularly elected regional councils of deputies by secret ballot in a two-round system if necessary. A candidate must receive the votes of over 50% of the deputies seated to be elected.

== Speakers of the Council of the Republic ==
Name	Entered office	Left office
Pavel Shipuk	January 13, 1997	December 19, 2000
Alexander Voitovich	December 19, 2000	July 28, 2003
Gennady Novitsky	July 28, 2003	October 31, 2008
Boris Batura	October 31, 2008	May 24, 2010
Anatoli Rubinov	May 24, 2010	December 2014
Mikhail Myasnikovich	December 27, 2014	December, 2019
Natalya Kochanova	December, 2019	Present

== See also ==
- National Assembly (Parliament) of Belarus
- House of Representatives of Belarus
- Politics of Belarus
- List of legislatures by country
