= Belarusian National Technical University =

Public university in Minsk, Belarus

Coordinates: 53°55′15″N 27°35′34″E

- Беларускі нацыянальны тэхнічны ўніверсітэт
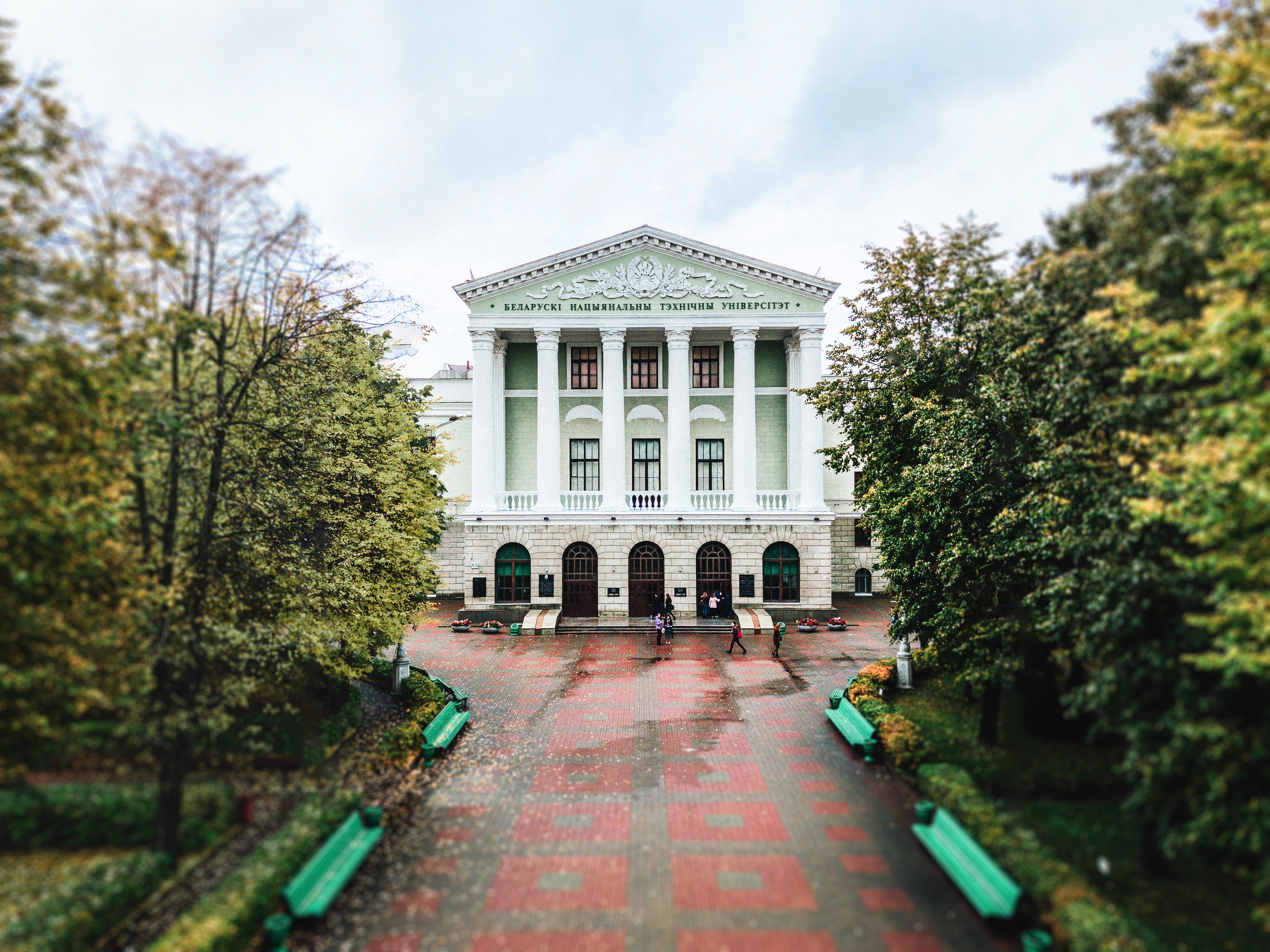
- Former names: Belarusian State Polytechnic Institute, Belarusian Polytechnic Institute, Belarusian State Polytechnic Academy
- Type: Public
- Established: 1920
- Rector: Sergei V. Kharytonchyk
- Academic staff: 1930
- Undergraduates: 33723
- Postgraduates: 776
- Location: Minsk, Belarus
- Campus: Urban
- Website: en.bntu.by
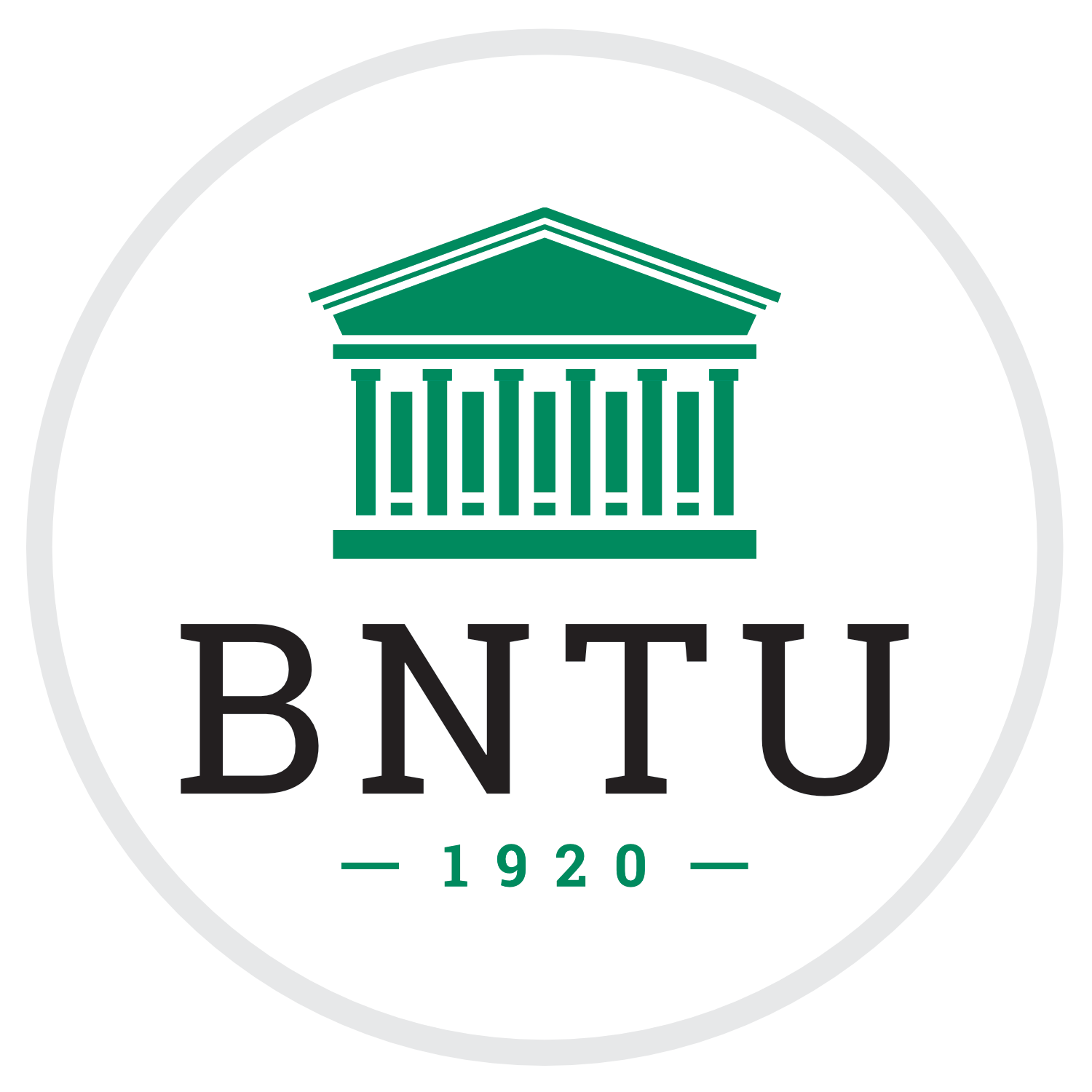

University rankings

Regional – Overall
- QS Emerging Europe and Central Asia: 82 (2022)

Belarusian National Technical University (BNTU) is a major technical university in Belarus.

== History ==
- 1920 – establishment of Belarusian State Polytechnic Institute on the basis of a Minsk Polytechnic school.
- 1922 – reorganised in Belarusian State Institute of Agriculture.
- 1933 – Belarusian Polytechnic Institute after adjunction of Horki Institute of Land Amelioration and Minsk Institutions of Peat, Chemical Engineering, Civil Engineering, Electrical Engineering and Food Industry.
- 1991 – Belarusian State Polytechnic Academy.
- 1997 – granted a leading engineering educational institution status in Belarusian educational system.
- 2002 – Belarusian National Technical University.

== Faculties ==
- Automotive and Tractor
- Mining Engineering and Engineering Ecology
- Mechanical Engineering
- Mechanics and Technology
- Marketing, Management and Entrepreneurship
- Power Engineering
- Information Technologies and Robotics
- Management Technologies and Humanitarization
- Soligorsk branch
- Engineering and Pedagogy
- Power Plant Construction and Engineering Services
- Architectural
- Civil Engineering
- Instrumentation Engineering
- Transport Communications
- Military and Technical
- Sports and Technical
- International Institute of Distance Education

== Notable alumni ==
- Vyacheslav Kebich, Prime-Minister of Belarus (1991–1994)
- Gennady Novitsky, Prime-Minister of Belarus (2001–2003)
- Gennadi Gagulia, Prime-Minister of Abkhazia (1995–1997, 2002–2003, 2018)
