= Vasily Dolgolyov =

Belarusian diplomat

Vasily Borisovich Dolgolyov (Russian: Василий Борисович Долголёв, romanized: Vasilij Borisovič Dolgoljov; Belarusian: Васіль Барысавiч Далгалёў, romanized: Vasil Barysavič Dałhalow; born 25 May 1951 in Rahachow, Gomel Region) is a Belarusian diplomat and a former Ambassador Extraordinary and Plenipotentiary of the Belarus to Russia.
