= Dmitry Krutoi =

Belarusian politician (born 1981)

- Дмитрий Крутой; Дзмітрый Крутой; Зьміцер Круты
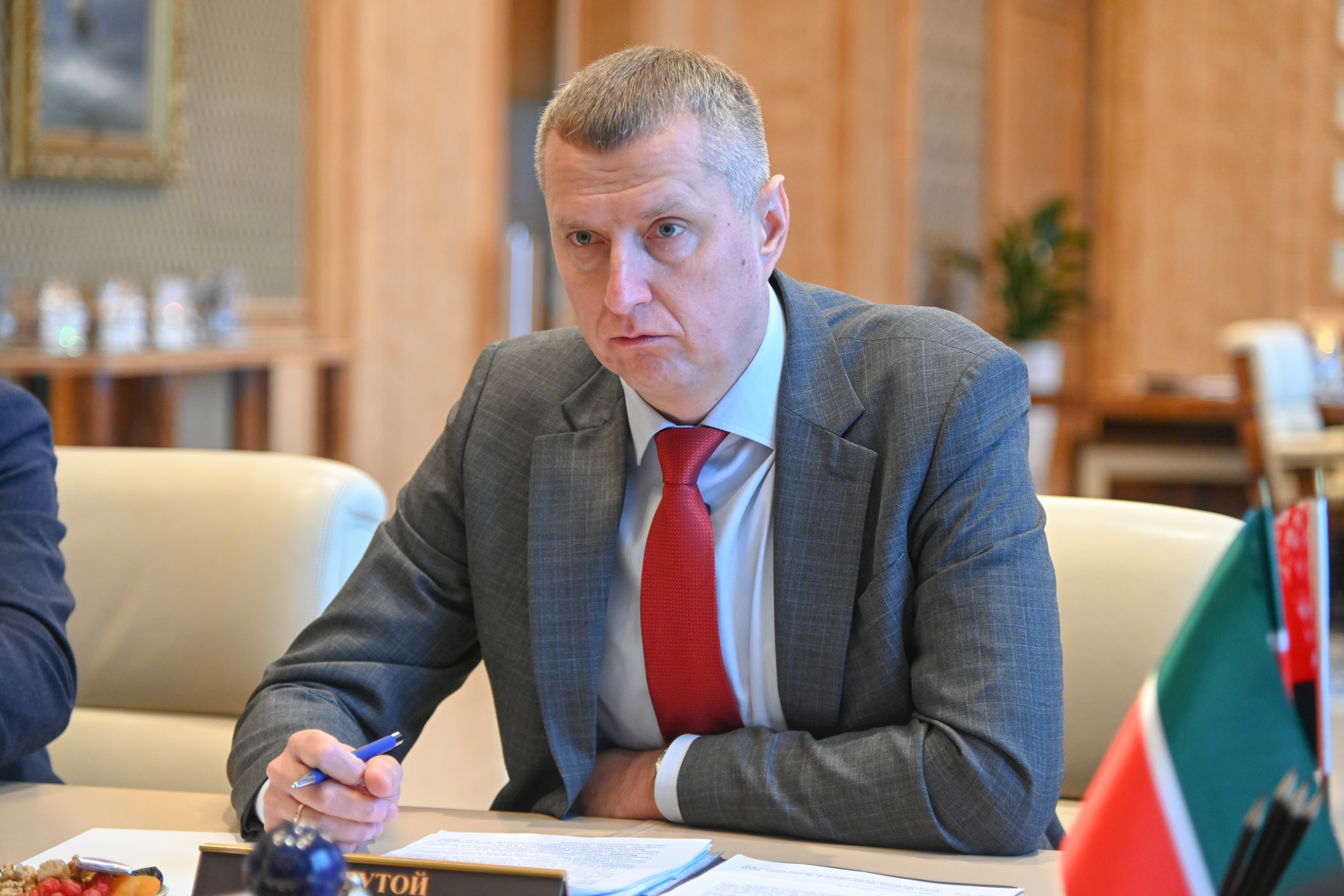
- Krutoi in 2023

Chief of Staff to the President
- Incumbent
- Assumed office 27 June 2024
- Preceded by: Igor Sergeenko

Ambassador of Belarus to Russia
- In office 1 August 2022 – 27 June 2024
- President: Alexander Lukashenko
- Preceded by: Vladimir Semashko
- Succeeded by: Alexander Rogozhnik

Personal details
- Born: 10 January 1981 (age 45) Byalynichy, Mogilev region, Belaursian SSR, USSR

Dmitry Nikolaevich Krutoi (Note: Dzmitryi Mikalayevich Krutoy in Belarusian and Zmitser Kruty in the Tarashkevitsa (Russian: Дмитрий Николаевич Крутой, Belarusian: Дзмітрый Мікалаевіч Крутой, Зьміцер Круты)) (born 10 January 1981) is a Belarusian politician serving as chief of staff to the president since 2024. He served as minister of economy from 2018 to 2019, as first deputy prime minister from 2019 to 2020, as deputy head of the Presidential Administration from 2020 to 2022, and as ambassador to Russia from 2022 to 2024.

Following the 2020 Belarusian presidential election, Krutoi was added to the sanctions lists of the Baltic states in late August 2020.
