= Sergei Sidorsky =

6th Prime Minister of Belarus From 2004 to 2010

- Сяргей Сідорскі; Сергей Сидорский
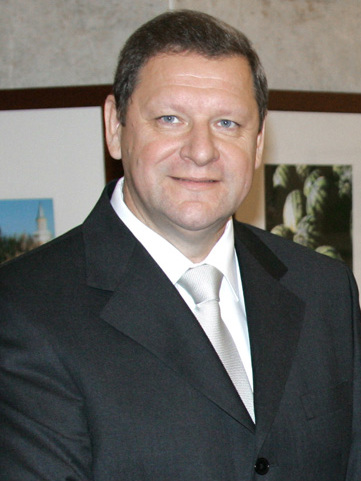
- Sidorsky in 2007

6th Prime Minister of Belarus
- In office 11 July 2004 – 28 December 2010
- President: Alexander Lukashenko
- Deputy: Vladimir Semashko
- Preceded by: Gennady Novitsky
- Succeeded by: Mikhail Myasnikovich

Personal details
- Born: Sergei Sergeevich Sidorsky; 13 March 1954 (age 72) Homiel, Byelorussian SSR, Soviet Union (now Belarus)
- Party: Independent

Sergei Sergeevich Sidorsky (Note: Belarusian: Сярге́й Сярге́евіч Сідо́рскі, romanized: Siarhiej Siarhiejevič Sidorski, IPA: [sʲarˈɣʲɛj sʲiˈdɔrskʲi]; Russian: Серге́й Серге́евич Сидо́рский, romanized: Sergey Sergeyevich Sidorskiy.) (born 13 March 1954) is a Belarusian politician who served as prime minister of Belarus from 11 July 2004 to 28 December 2010. He was appointed acting prime minister on July 11, 2004 to replace the dismissed Gennady Novitsky, and was confirmed as permanent Prime Minister on December 19, 2004.

== Early life and career ==
Sergei Sergeevich Sidorsky was born on 13 March 1954 in Homiel. He graduated from school №12 in 1971. In 1976, he graduated from the Belarusian Institute of Railway Engineers (Faculty of Electrical Engineering).

Sidorsky began his working life as an electrical fitter and electrician. From 1976 to 1991, he began his journey at the Homiel Radio Equipment Plant, where he started as a foreman of the assembly shop. He quickly rose through the ranks, becoming the head of the laboratory and later the head of the department. Eventually, he assumed the role of deputy director, where he contributed significantly to the plant's operations.

In 1991, Sidorsky was made director of the Homiel Radio Equipment Plant. He managed the plant's operations and ensured its continued growth and success until 1992.

Following his tenure at the plant, Sidorsky served as the general manager of the Research and Production Association RATON in Homiel from 1992 to 1998. During this time, he oversaw various research and production activities.

== Government ==
In 1998, Sidorsky transitioned to the realm of public service, accepting the position of deputy chairman and subsequently first deputy chairman at the Homiel Voblast Administration. In these roles, he played a crucial role in the administration, contributing to the development and management of the region.

Sidorsky's dedication and expertise did not go unnoticed, as he was appointed as the Deputy Prime Minister of the Republic of Belarus in 2001. Continuing his ascent, Sidorsky became the First Deputy Prime Minister and Acting Prime Minister of the Republic of Belarus from 2002 to 2003.

== Prime minister ==
From December 2003 to December 2010, Sidorsky served as the Prime Minister of the Republic of Belarus, occupying a pivotal position in the government. In this capacity, he spearheaded various policies and initiatives aimed at promoting economic growth, social development, and international cooperation.

== Post-premiership ==
On December 13, 2011, he was appointed a member of the Board (Minister) for Industry and Agro-Industrial Complex of the Eurasian Economic Commission.

== Awards and honours ==
Sidorski has the title of Honoured Workman of the Industry of the Republic of Belarus. He is Doctor of Engineering Sciences and academician at the International Engineering Academy. He is an expert in vacuum-plasma technologies and author of more than 40 scientific publications and monographs. In 2009, he was honored by Ukrainian president Viktor Yushchenko with the distinction of "Honorary Weapon", for his "significant personal contribution to the development of Ukrainian-Belarusian relations".

== Personal life ==
Sidorsky is married and has two daughters. Besides Belarusian, he also speaks Russian and German.

== Notes ==
Political offices
Preceded by Gennady Novitsky	Prime Minister of Belarus; 2003–2010	Succeeded by Mikhail Myasnikovich
