= Alexander Turchin =

Prime Minister of Belarus since 2025

- Аляксaндaр Турчын (Belarusian); Алексaндр Турчин (Russian)
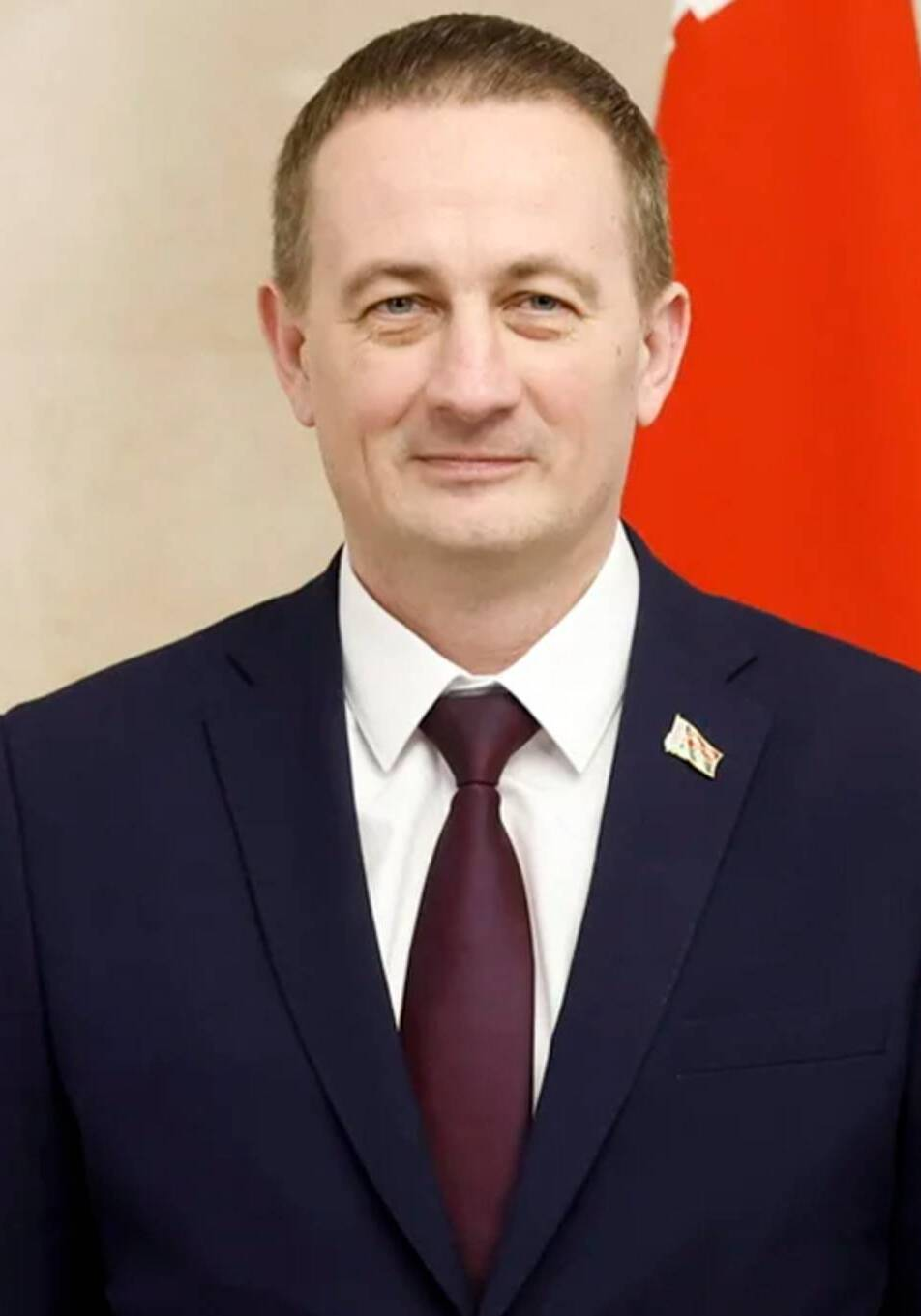
- Turchin in 2025

11th Prime Minister of Belarus
- Incumbent
- Assumed office 10 March 2025
- President: Alexander Lukashenko
- Preceded by: Roman Golovchenko

Chairman of Minsk Region
- In office 3 December 2019 – 10 March 2025
- President: Alexander Lukashenko
- Preceded by: Anatoly Isachenko
- Succeeded by: Alexey Kushnarenko

First Deputy Prime Minister of Belarus
- In office 18 August 2018 – 3 December 2019
- President: Alexander Lukashenko
- Prime Minister: Sergei Rumas
- Preceded by: Vasily Matyushevsky
- Succeeded by: Dmitry Krutoy

Personal details
- Born: 2 July 1975 (age 51) Novogrudok, Belarusian SSR, Soviet Union
- Party: Independent
- Children: 1
- Education: Belarus State Economic University; Academy of Public Administration
- Awards: Order of the Fatherland

Alexander Genrikhovich Turchin (Russian: Алексaндр Гeнрихович Турчин, Belarusian: Аляксaндaр Гeнрыхавіч Турчын, romanized: Alaksandar Hienrychavič Turčyn; born 2 July 1975) is a Belarusian politician serving as the 11th Prime Minister of Belarus since 10 March 2025. He was previously the chairman of the executive committee of Minsk Region from 3 December 2019 and was the first deputy prime minister of Belarus from 2018 to 2019.

== Early life and education ==
He was born on 2 July 1975, in Novogrudok. His mother worked as a medical worker, and his father worked as a physics teacher at school. Later, for many years, Genrikh Stanislavovich was the head of the organizational department at the Novogrudok city party committee, and then the manager of affairs at the district executive committee.

In 1992, Alexander Turchin entered the Mogilev Machine-Building Institute, but dropped out after three years. Then, for two years, from 1995 to 1997, he was registered as unemployed at the Novogrudok employment center in the Grodno region. He did not serve in the army.

For 7 months, Alexander Turchin was listed as a guard at the Novogrudok district executive committee, where his father worked. In 1997, his father, through acquaintances, got him a job as a manager of a grocery store at the Avangard collective farm in the Novogrudok district. Then he worked as a state tax inspector of the state tax committee inspectorate for the Novogrudok district, and as a chief controller-auditor of the control and audit department of the Ministry of Finance of the Republic of Belarus for the Novogrudok district of the Grodno Region.

In 2002, he graduated from the Belarus State Economic University, and in 2009, from the Academy of Public Administration.

== Career ==
In 2004–2010, he worked first as the head of the financial department, and then as deputy chairman of the Korelichi district executive committee of the Grodno region. In 2010, he was appointed chairman of the economics committee of the Minsk regional executive committee.

On 16 November 2012, he was appointed deputy chairman of the Minsk regional executive committee. On 25 June 2015, he was appointed Aide to the President of the Republic of Belarus — Chief Inspector for the Gomel Region. On 16 September 2016, he was appointed Head of the Office of the Council of Ministers of the Republic of Belarus.

On 10 October 2017, he was appointed Chairman of the Council for Entrepreneurship Development, an advisory body to the President of the Republic of Belarus. From 1 February 2018, he served as Commissioner of the President of the Republic of Belarus for the Gomel Region.

On 18 August 2018, he was appointed First Deputy Prime Minister of the Republic of Belarus. On 21 November 2018, by Decree No. 456, he was appointed Acting Head of the Office of the Council of Ministers of the Republic of Belarus.

On 29 November 2019, at a meeting, Alexander Lukashenko decided that First Deputy Prime Minister of Belarus Alexander Turchin would be appointed Governor of the Minsk Region and replace Anatoly Isachenko in this position. Turchin himself will be replaced in his post by Minister of Economy Dmitry Krutoy. Alexander Lukashenko explained that the leadership of the Minsk region is not changing due to personnel problems: the current governor Anatoly Isachenko is leaving his post due to health reasons. The President noted that he worked well as governor, so when he changes his post, he will continue to oversee this region. By Decree of the President of the Republic of Belarus dated 3 December 2019, No. 433, he was appointed to the post of Chairman of the Minsk Regional Executive Committee.

On 4 December 2019, an extraordinary 22nd session of the regional Council of Deputies was held, approving Alexander Turchin as Chairman of the Minsk Regional Executive Committee.

On 17 December 2020, Turchin was sanctioned by the European Union. Albania, Iceland, Lichtenstein, Montenegro, North Macedonia, Norway and Switzerland aligned themselves with these sanctions. Turchin is also banned from entering the United Kingdom since 18 February 2021.

On 10 March 2025, by decree of the President of Belarus Alexander Lukashenko, he was appointed Prime Minister of Belarus.

== Personal life ==
He is married to Inna and has a daughter, Darya.
