= Government of Belarus =

National government

Council of Ministers of the Republic of Belarus
- Савет Міністраў Рэспублікі Беларусь
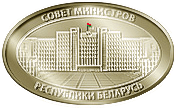
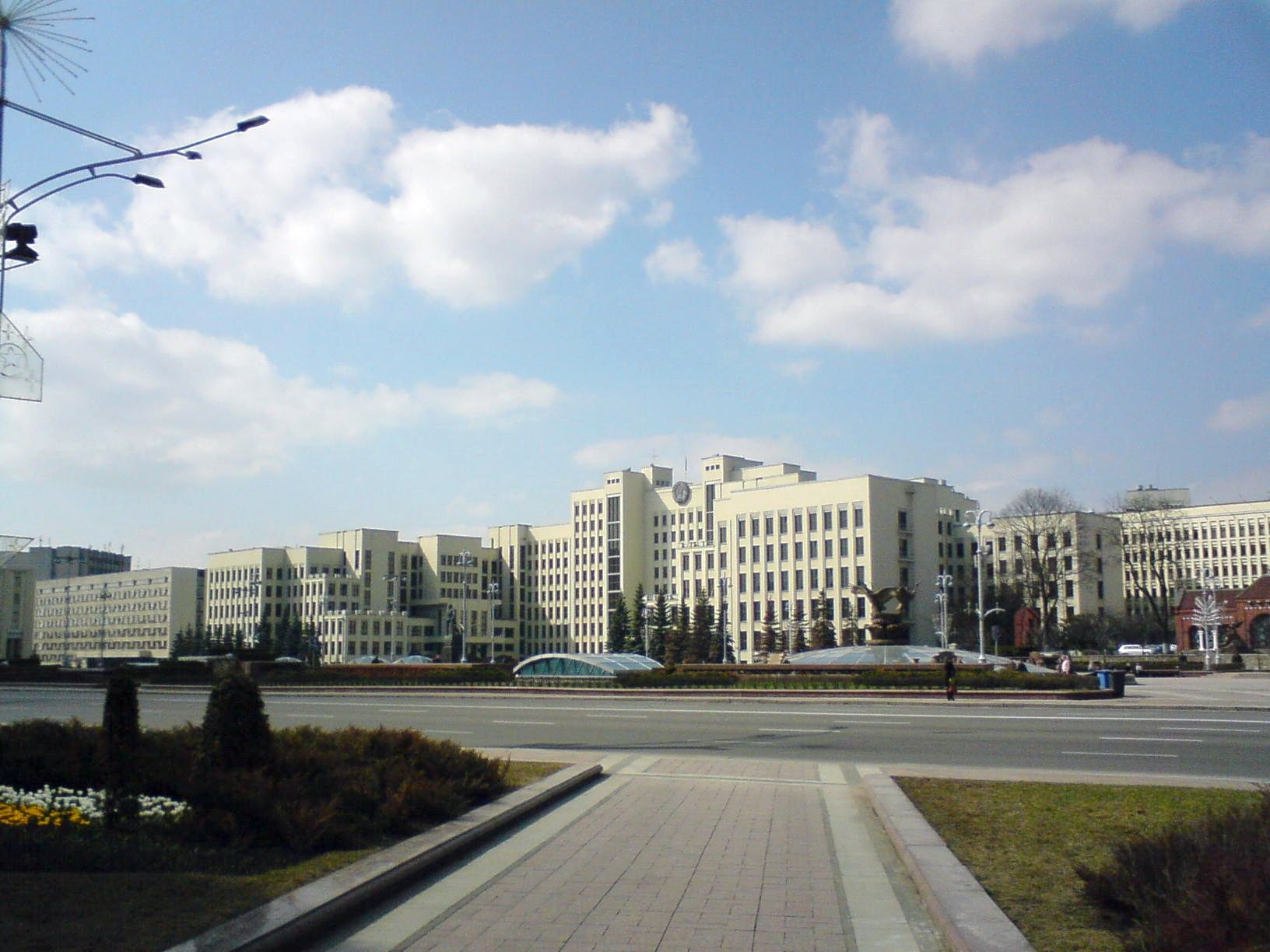

Overview
- Established: 1994 (current form)
- State: Belarus
- Leader: Prime Minister
- Appointed by: President
- Main organ: Council of Ministers
- Responsible to: National Assembly; President
- Headquarters: Government House, Minsk
- Website: government.gov.by

The Government of the Republic of Belarus (Belarusian: Урад Рэспублікі Беларусь, romanized: Urad Respubliki Byelarus), which consists of the Council of Ministers of the Republic of Belarus (Belarusian: Савет Міністраў Рэспублікі Беларусь, romanized: Savyet Ministraw Respubliki Byelarus), is the executive branch of state power in Belarus, and is appointed by the President of Belarus. The head of the Government is the Prime Minister of Belarus, who manages the main agenda of the government and direct the ministers.

== Powers and duties ==
The Council of Ministers is the highest administrative organ and is responsible for the daily operations of the government. It is reporting to the President of Belarus and accountable to the National Assembly. The Council of Ministers issues resolutions that are binding on the entire territory of the Republic of Belarus. The Prime Minister issues orders within the limits of his competence. It has the following competences

- Manages the system of state administration bodies and other executive bodies subordinate to it, including: state administrative bodies, ministries, state committees, concerns (Belgoskharchprom, Bellegprom, Bellespopreprom, Belneftekhim) and organizations subordinate to the government (Belarusian Republican Union of Consumer Societies)
- Develops the main directions of domestic and foreign policy and takes measures to implement them;
- Develops and submits to the President for submission to Parliament a draft republican budget and a report on its implementation;
- Ensures the implementation of a unified economic, financial, credit and monetary policy, state policy in the fields of science, culture, education, healthcare, ecology, social security and wages;
- Takes measures to ensure the rights and freedoms of citizens, protect the interests of the state, national security and defense, protect property and public order, and combat crime;
- Acts on behalf of the owner in relation to property owned by the Republic of Belarus, organizes the management of state property;
- Ensures the implementation of the Constitution, laws and decrees, decrees and orders of the President;
- Repeals acts of ministries and other republican state administration bodies;
- Exercises other powers vested in it by the Constitution, laws and acts of the President.

== Structure ==
Below are the 30 members of the Council of Ministers as of 19 August 2020, as well as the head of the presidential administration and the chairmen of the State Committees, who are not technically ministers but are included in the Council of Ministers. Offices which are not technically counted as ministerial posts are italicized. The prime minister, the first deputy prime minister(s), the deputy prime minister(s), the ministers of economy, finance, and foreign affairs, the head of the presidential administration, and the chairman of the State Control Committee together form the Presidium of the Council of Ministers. These officials are highlighted in yellow. The incumbent government resigned en masse on 17 August 2020. A new government was formed on 19 August 2020, consisting of mostly the same people.

=== Composition ===
As of 2023:

Prime Minister	Alexander Turchin
First Deputy Prime Minister	Nikolai Snopkov
Deputy Prime Minister	Anatoly Sivak
Deputy Prime Minister	Natalia Petkevich
Deputy Prime Minister	Yuri Shuleiko
Deputy Prime Minister	Viktor Karankevich
Minister of Agriculture and Food	Yuri Gorlov
Minister of Antimonopoly Regulation and Trade	Artur Karpovich
Minister of Architecture and Construction	Alexander Studnev
Minister of Culture	Ruslan Chernetsky
Minister of Defence	Victor Khrenin
Minister of Economy	Yuri Chebotar
Minister of Education	Andrei Ivanets
Minister of Emergency Situations	Vadim Sinyavsky
Minister of Energy	Denis Moroz
Minister of Finance	Yury Seliverstov
Minister of Foreign Affairs	Maxim Ryzhenkov
Minister of Forestry	Alexander Kulik
Minister of Health Care	Alexander Khodjaev
Minister of Housing-Communal Services	Gennady Trubilo
Minister of Industry	Alexander Yefimov
Minister of Information	Marat Markov
Minister of Internal Affairs	Ivan Kubrakov
Minister of Justice	Evgeny Kovalenko
Minister of Labour and Social Protection	Natalya Pavluchenko
Minister of Natural Resources and Environmental Conservation	Sergei Maslyak
Minister of Sport and Tourism	Sergei Kovalchuk
Minister of Taxes and Duties	Dmitry Kiyko
Minister of Telecommunications and Informatisation	Kirill Zalessky
Minister of Transport and Communications	Alexei Lyakhnovich
Chairman of the State Security Committee	Ivan Tertel
Chairman of the State Control Committee	Vasily Gerasimov
Chairman of the State Military-Industrial Committee	Dmitry Pantus
Chairman of the State Committee on Property	Dmitry Matusevich
Chairman of the State Committee on Science and Technology	Sergei Shlychkov
Chairman of the State Committee on Standardisation	Alena Marhunova
Chairman of the State Border Committee	Konstantin Molostov
Chairman of the State Customs Committee	Vladimir Orlovsky
Head of the Presidential Administration	Dmitry Krutoi
Chairman of the National Bank	Roman Golovchenko
Chairman of the Presidium of the National Academy of Science	Vladimir Karanik
Chairman of the Board of the Republican Union of Consumer Societies	Inesa Karatkevich
