= Ministry of Health (Belarus) =

Government ministry of Belarus

Ministry of Health of the Republic of Belarus
- Міністэрства аховы здароўя Рэспублікі Беларусь; Министерство здравоохранения Республики Беларусь
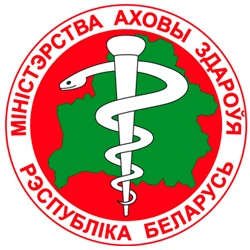
- Emblem of the Ministry

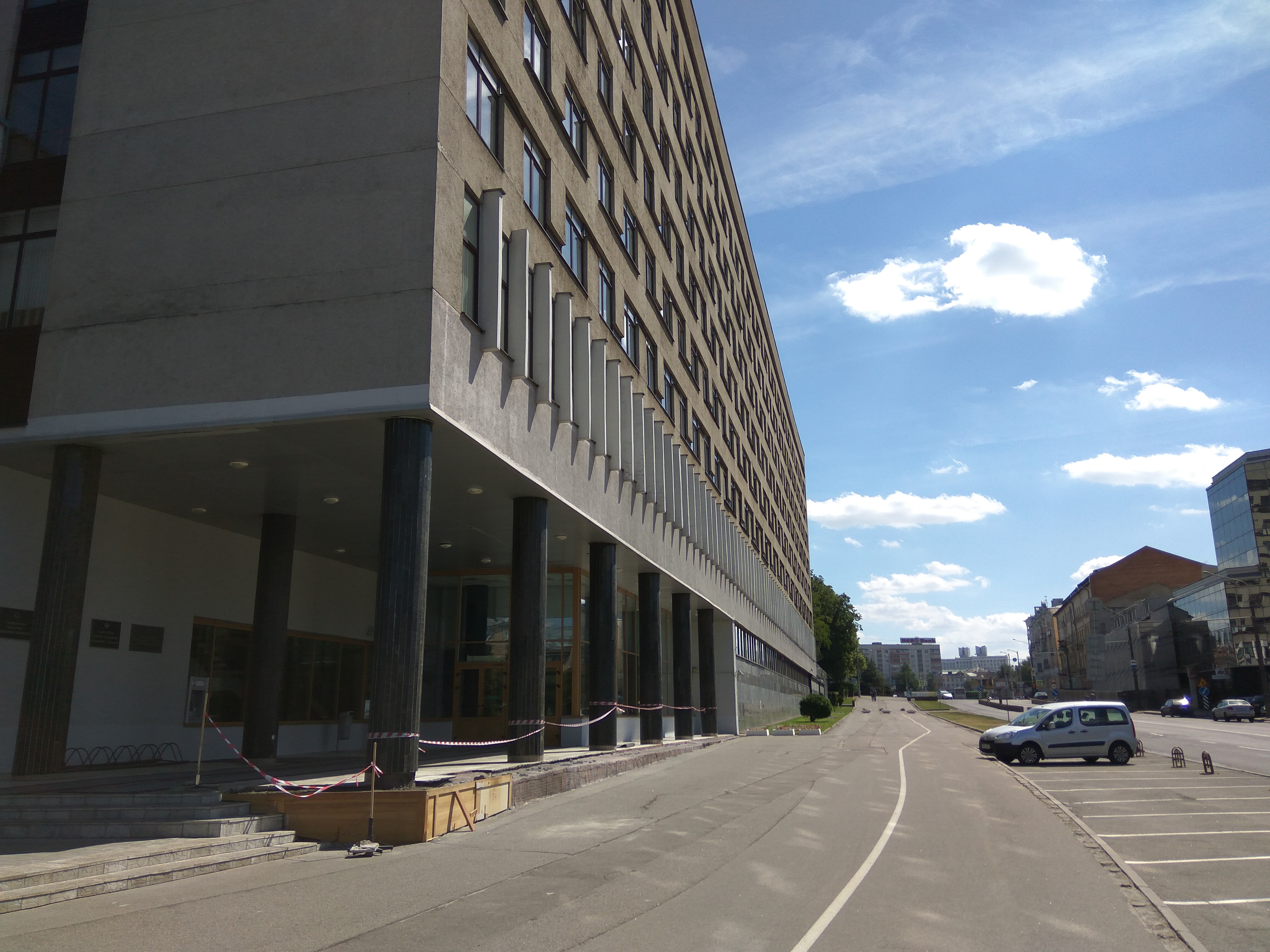
- Ministry headquarters

Agency overview
- Formed: 11 July 1990
- Preceding agency: Ministry of Health of the Soviet Union
- Jurisdiction: Government of Belarus
- Headquarters: 39 Myasnikova Street, Minsk; 53.5344°N 27.3233°E
- Minister responsible: Alexander Khodjaev
- Website: www.minzdrav.gov.by

The Ministry of Health of the Republic of Belarus (Belarusian: Міністэрства аховы здароўя Рэспублікі Беларусь, romanized: Ministerstva achovy zdaroŭja Respubliki Bielaruś; Russian: Министерство здравоохранения Республики Беларусь) is the Belarusian government ministry that is responsible for overseeing the health care system and public health policies in Belarus. The ministry is headquartered on 39 Myasnikova Street in Minsk.

Belarus spent approximately 4.9% of its GDP on health in 2021 amid the COVID-19 pandemic, a 1% increase from 3.9% in 2018. This equates to about US$3.58 billion of the country's 73.129 billion GDP in 2024. It also represents about US$1,400 per person, or around 4,578 Belarusian rubles, which is about half the expenditure per person compared to the European Union.

The minister of health is the head of the department. They are appointed by the president of Belarus, who is currently Alexander Lukashenko. The minister is assisted by the first deputy minister of health, the deputy minister for pharmaceutical affairs, the chief state sanitary doctor, the state secretary, and the deputy ministers of health. The current minister of health is Alexander Khodjaev, who has served in this role since 2024.

== History ==
On 5 January 1919 the Commissariat of Health of the Byelorussian SSR was created, which in February 1919 was renamed to the People's Commissariat of Health. In March 1946 it became the Ministry of Health of the BSSR, During the collapse of the Soviet Union, on 11 July 1990 the ministry transitioned from being a union-republican ministry to a republic ministry, becoming subordinate only to the Council of Ministers of the BSSR and so was solely a national institution.

== Structure ==
=== Leadership ===
The Ministry of Health is organized as follows in leadership:

- Minister of Health
- First Deputy Minister of Health
- Deputy Ministers of Health
- Deputy Minister for Pharmaceutical Affairs
- Chief State Sanitary Doctor of Belarus
- State Secretary of the Ministry of Health

In addition, the leadership forms a board that consists of the minister (who is chairman of the body) and the deputies, although it may include other senior officials in the central office of the Ministry of Health. The board is meant to discuss the activities of the Ministry of Health, although the minister can overrule the decisions made by the body.

=== Departments and directorates ===
The Ministry of Health is organized as follows in departments:

- Reception Offices of the Minister and Deputy Ministers
- Head Office for Medical Care Assistance
  - Office for Specialized Medical Care
  - Department of Primary Health Care
  - Department of Medical Care for Mothers and Children
- Head Office Personnel Policy, Educational Institution
  - Office for Professional Education in Healthcare
  - Office for Personnel Policy, Documentation Management and Material and Technical Support
- Office for Economics
  - Office for Economics of Commercial Activities
  - Department of Labor Organization and Material Incentives
  - Department of Analysis, Planning and Financing
- Office for Control of Medical Activities
  - Department of Licensing of Medical Activities
- Office for Pharmaceutical Inspection
- Drug Supply Office
- Office for Methodology, Accounting and Reporting
- Office for Legal Affairs
  - Department of the Appeals of Citizens and Legal Entities
- Department of Hygiene, Epidemiology and Prevention
- Procurement, Medical Devices and Healthcare Facility Modernization Regulatory Department
- Emergency Medical Protection Department
- Science Department
- External Affairs Department
- IT Department

In addition, the department has three advisory bodies:

- National Council for Public Health
- Committee for Medical Ethics and Patient Rights
- Commission for Healthcare Quality and Standards

=== Ministry agencies ===
- Republican Scientific and Practical Center for Medical Technologies
- State Pharmaceutical Inspection
- National Center for Hygiene and Epidemiology
- Belarusian Medical Academy of Postgraduate Education
- Republican Center for Health Promotion and Disease Prevention

== Ministers of Health ==
- Vasily Kazakov 1990-1994
- Inessa Drobyshevskaya 1994-1997
- Igor Zelenkevich 1997-2001
- Vladislav Ostapenko 2001-2002
- Lyudmila Postoyalko 2002-2006
- Viktor Rudenko January 2006-May 2006 (acting)
- Vasily Zharko May 2006-December 2016
- Valery Malashko January 2017-11 June 2019
- Vladimir Karanik 11 June 2019 – 22 August 2020
- Dmitry Pinevich 24 August 2020 – 25 January 2024
- Alexander Khodjaev 25 January 2024–present

== See also ==
- History of Belarus
- Politics of Belarus
- Cabinet of Belarus
- List of Belarus-related topics
