= National Atlas of Belarus =

National Atlas of Belarus (Belarusian: Нацыянальны атлас Беларусі) is a fundamental state scientific publication: a cartographic work (atlas), which highlights modern data about Belarus, it characterizes the natural conditions and resources, demographic, economic, and historical situation in the country.

== Description ==
The atlas consists of 19 sections. It includes more than 120 maps.

The format of the book is 40x47 cm, its weight is about 5 kilograms.

The first representative edition of the book was 2 thousand copies.

== History ==
The prerequisite for the creation of the National Atlas was the Decree of the President of the Republic of Belarus Alexander Lukashenko of May 12, 1999 N 269. The coordinating council consisting of 10 people, most of whom are directors of research institutes and with academic degrees, was established. The customer of the atlas is the State Committee for Land Resources, Geodesy and Cartography under the Council Ministers of the Republic of Belarus. The atlas was created by about 450 specialists from more than 60 organizations. The atlas was published in 2002.
