= Sergey Kovalchuk =

Sergey Kovalchuk may refer to:

- Serghei Covalciuc (born 1982), Moldovan footballer
- Syarhey Kavalchuk (born 1978), Belarusian footballer
- Sergey Kovalchuk (politician) (born 1968), Belarusian politician
- Sergey Petrovich Kovalchuk (born 1973), Belarusian footballer and coach
