= Dmitry Pinevich =

Belarusian doctor and politician (born 1967)

Dmitry Leonidovich Pinevich
- Дзмітрый Леанідавіч Піневіч; Дмитрий Леонидович Пиневич
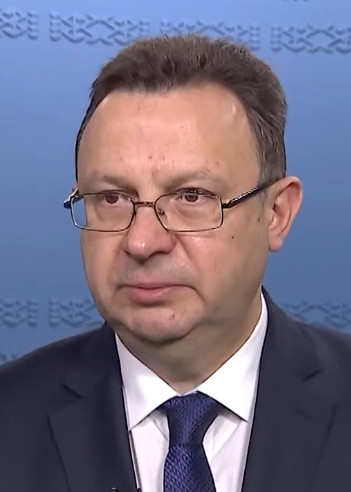
- Pinevich in 2021

Minister of Health of the Republic of Belarus
- In office 27 November 2020 – 25 January 2024
- President: Alexander Lukashenko
- Prime Minister: Roman Golovchenko
- Preceded by: Vladimir Karanik
- Succeeded by: Alexander Khodjaev

Ambassador of Belarus to Azerbaijan
- Incumbent
- Assumed office 14 January 2025
- President: Alexander Lukashenko
- Preceded by: Andrei Ravkov

Personal details
- Born: November 17, 1967 (age 58) Ilya, Minsk Region, Byelorussian SSR, Soviet Union
- Education: S. M. Kirov Military Medical Academy; Academy of Public Administration
- Occupation: Doctor; Politician

Military service
- Allegiance: Soviet Union
- Branch/service: Soviet Armed Forces
- Years of service: 1990-1992
- Rank: Lieutenant Colonel of the Reserve
- Unit: 642nd Guards Aviation Bratislava Red Banner Fighter-Bomber Regiment

Dmitry Leonidovich Pinevich (Belarusian: Дзмітрый Леанідавіч Піневіч; born 17 October 1967) is a Belarusian doctor and politician. He served as the Minister of Health of the Republic of Belarus from 2020 to 2024. He is currently the Ambassador of Belarus to Azerbaijan.

== Early life ==
Pinevich was born on 17 October 1967 in Ilya, which was part of the Minsk region in the Byelorussian SSR at the time of his birth. His family mostly consisted of teachers. His father, Leonid, was a native of Ryasno, an agricultural town in Drybin district, who came to visit his brother in Ilya but decided to stay there to work at Ilyinsky Agrarian College, where he taught technical materials and was the director of the educational institution state. His mother, Anna Pinevich, was born in Lida district and eventually graduated from the Minsk State Linguistic University before also going to Ilyinsky Agrarian College to teach, where she met his father. He has one brother named Sergei, who graduated from the Belarusian National Technical University and works as a technician.

After finishing his schooling in Ilya, he attended the S. M. Kirov Military Medical Academy. He graduated in 1990 with honors, receiving a red diploma with a gold medal, and received a degree in general medicine, which qualified him as a doctor.

== Medical career ==
Afterward, from 1990 to 1992 he was the doctor for medical services of the military unit 78530 (642nd Guards Aviation Bratislava Red Banner Fighter-Bomber Regiment), which was stationed in Voznesensk, then part of the Ukrainian SSR. Upon the collapse of the Soviet Union, he did not want to take the citizenship of Ukraine, so he returned to Belarus. From 1993 to 1994 he then worked as a surgeon at the 36th City Polyclinic in Minsk, before becoming Deputy Chief Physician for the Medical Unit for Civil Defense of the 5th City Clinical Hospital, which was also located in Minsk from 1994 to 1999. From 1999 to 2002 he was the Chief Physician of the 6th City Clinical Hospital in Minsk. Briefly, from January 2002 to June 2002, he was Head of the Department for Control of health, Social Protection, Sports and Tourism of the Department Control in social sectors within the State Control Committee of the Republic of Belarus.

Afterward, from 2002 to 2011, he was Chairman of the Health Committee of the Minsk City Executive Committee. On 15 April 2011, he was appointed First Deputy Minister of Health. During his time there, he noted that there was a shortage of medical personnel in Minsk, so he promised to raise salaries in 2008.

== Political career ==
=== Minister of Health ===
On 24 August 2020, he was appointed Acting Health Minister, as the then Minister of Health, Vladimir Karanik, took up the post of Governor of Grodno Region, and Pinevich was his immediate successor as First Deputy. In September 2020, while acting minister, he stated the main problems of the ministry was that there were no economic incentives for healthcare, there was intensive work of medical personnel with low wages which led to turnover, and lag in the issues of informatization. He stated by 2023 he planned to revise the regulatory framework of healthcare, switch to the model of clinical-cost groups, build a unified information system, and to have a new system of accreditation. A few months later, on 27 November 2020, he was appointed Minister of Health to replace Karanik officially.

During his time as minister, COVID-19 became a pandemic. In the fall of 2021, Pinevich implemented mandatory wearing of masks, social distancing in public places, mass vaccinations, and suspended the provision of planned medical care. In response, Lukashenko stated that it created panic throughout the country and that people in Brest were forced to get the vaccine, so the restrictive measures were soon lifted. He also faced criticism for underreporting the mortality rate of COVID, even though, according to The Lancet at the time of the epidemic, Belarus ranked seventh in mortality in the world from the virus. He also introduced Covid allowances to doctors, but the stimulation was stopped in July 2022.

He also attempted to solve the problem of an outflow of trained doctors, proposing to increase doctors' training and changing the rules of internships so that they have more time off, and mandatory work was increased to five years, and if doctors did not do the mandatory time, they would face large fines. Medicine prices also sharply rose by 13.4% in 2023, but his ministry attempted to regulate dental services. He officially announced in January 2023 that the COVID-19 pandemic had ended in Belarus. In March 2023, he announced that in April the first prototype of a Belarusian vaccine against COVID-19 was expected. In April 2023 he then stated that the ministry would stop promoting foreign medical products, stating that it was a scheme for hidden bribery of doctors.

On 25 January 2024, Pinevich was dismissed from the post. He was replaced by Alexander Khodjaev.

=== Post-ministerial role and ambassador ===
In September 2024, it was reported that Pinevich had returned to Belarus from Russia. After his dismissal, he disappeared from public life and began supplying medical equipment. On 14 January 2025, Lukashenko announced that Pinevich was appointed as the Ambassador to Azerbaijan, succeeding Andrey Ravkov. He officially presented his credentials to President Ilham Aliyev on 13 February.

Upon being appointed ambassador, Pinevich stated that the two countries were strategic partners as they were both key transit countries. He also stated in May 2025 that Belarus would organize cultural events in Azerbaijan and vice versa.

== Controversies ==
Pinevich has led the medical and anti-doping commission of the NOC of Belarus and the Belarus Red Cross on an interim basis during 2020. The red cross under his tenure faced criticism during the 2020–2021 Belarusian protests for alleged involvement in electoral irregularities during the 2020 Belarusian presidential election. He faced allegations from human rights groups and the National Anti-Crisis Management that people involved in the Belarusian Red Cross were also involved in election commissions and that places where representatives of the organization were working had discrepancies in votes cast for Sviatlana Tsikhanouskaya that resulted in a lower number of votes for her. He was also criticized for the alleged detaining of doctors like anesthesiologist Dmitry Morozov, Andrei Lyubetsky, and Tatyana Tolochko and listing them as terrorists while reportedly torturing them.

== Honours and awards ==
- Order of Honor (21 December 2020; Belarus)
- Medal for Labor Merit (2009; Belarus)
- Certificate of Honor of the Council of Ministers of the Republic of Belarus (2008, 2015; Belarus)

== See also ==
- COVID-19 pandemic in Belarus
- Azerbaijan–Belarus relations
