= Ruslan Parkhamovich =

Belarusian politician (born 1980)

Minister of Architecture and Construction
- In office 4 June 2020 – 4 March 2025
- President: Alexander Lukashenko
- Prime Minister: Roman Golovchenko
- Preceded by: Dmitry Mikulenok
- Succeeded by: Alexander Studnev

Personal details
- Born: 18 July 1980 (age 46)

Ruslan Viktorovich Parkhamovich (Russian: Руслан Викторович Пархамович; born 18 July 1980) is a Belarusian politician serving as inspector for the Gomel region since 2025. From 2020 to 2025, he served as minister of architecture and construction.
