= Igor Karpenko (politician) =

Belarusian politician (born 1964)

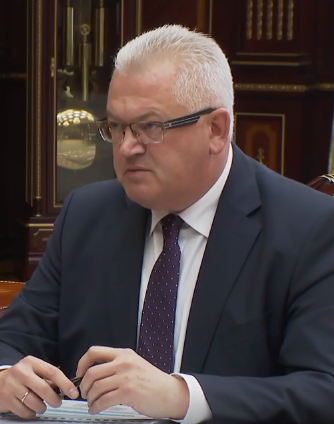
- Karpenko in 2019

Chairman of the Central Election Commission
- Incumbent
- Assumed office 13 December 2021
- President: Alexander Lukashenko
- Preceded by: Lidia Yermoshina

Minister of Education
- In office 15 December 2016 – 13 December 2021
- President: Alexander Lukashenko
- Prime Minister: Andrei Kobyakov; Syarhey Rumas; Roman Golovchenko
- Preceded by: Mikhail Zhuravkov
- Succeeded by: Andrei Ivanets

First Secretary of the Communist Party
- In office 20 October 2012 – 14 May 2017
- Preceded by: Tatyana Golubeva
- Succeeded by: Aliaksiej Sokal

Personal details
- Born: 28 April 1964 (age 61)
- Party: Communist Party of Belarus

Igor Vasilievich Karpenko (Russian: Игорь Васильевич Карпенко; born 28 April 1964) is a Belarusian politician serving as chairman of the Central Election Commission since 2021. From 2016 to 2021, he served as minister of education. From 2012 to 2017, he served as first secretary of the Communist Party.

== International Sanctions ==
On 3 June 2022, the EU Council moved to imposed personal restrictions on Karpenko, namely an asset freeze and a travel ban, due to his role as the Chairman of the Central election Commission in organizing, conducting, and certifying the 2022 February constitutional referendum that did not meet international standards of fairness and transparency. Earlier that year, he was added to the sanctions list of Canada.

In March 2023, Karpenko was added to the Specially Designated Nationals and Blocked Persons List of the US.

On 27 January 2025, the UK's Foreign Office imposed sanctions on Belarusian officials, including Karpenko, in response to the fraudulent 2025 presidential elections that took place on Sunday, the day before.
