= Vadim Ipatov =

Belarusian politician (born 1964)

- Вадзім Іпатаў
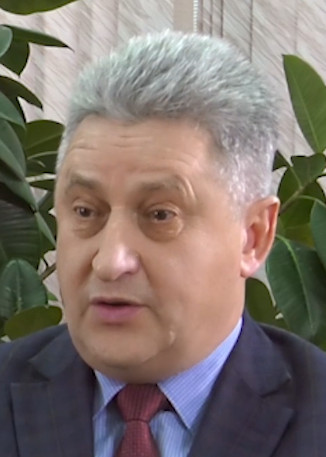
- Ipatov in 2020

Deputy Speaker of the House of Representatives
- Incumbent
- Assumed office 22 March 2024
- Preceded by: Valery Mitskevich

Personal details
- Born: 30 October 1964 (age 61)

Vadim Dmitrievich Ipatov (Russian: Вадим Дмитриевич Ипатов; born 30 October 1964) is a Belarusian politician serving as deputy speaker of the House of Representatives since 2024. Until 2024, he served as deputy chairman of the Central Election Commission.
