= Andrei Khmel =

Belarusian politician (born 1983)

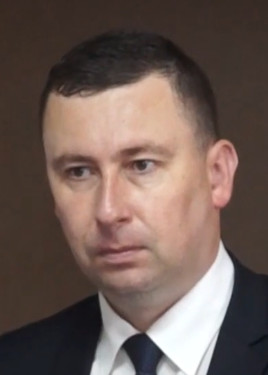
- Khmel in 2020

Minister of Housing and Utilities
- In office 4 June 2020 – 30 May 2023
- President: Alexander Lukashenko
- Prime Minister: Roman Golovchenko
- Preceded by: Alexander Terekhov
- Succeeded by: Gennady Trubilo

Personal details
- Born: 1983 (age 42–43) Byelorussian SSR, Soviet Union

Andrei Valerievich Khmel (Russian: Андрей Валерьевич Хмель; Belarusian: Андрэй Валер’евіч Хмель, romanized: Andrej Valjer'jevič Khmelj; born 1983) is a Belarusian politician serving as mayor of Grodno since 2023. From 2020 to 2023, he served as minister of housing and utilities.
