= Valery Malashko =

Belarusian politician (born 1966)

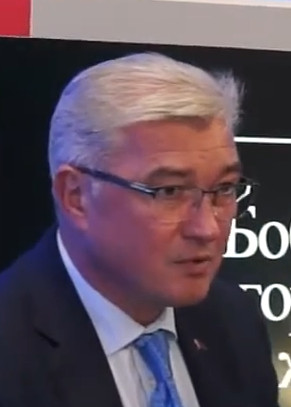
- Malashko in 2020

Minister of Health
- In office 27 January 2017 – 11 June 2019
- President: Alexander Lukashenko
- Prime Minister: Andrei Kobyakov; Syarhey Rumas
- Preceded by: Vasily Zharko
- Succeeded by: Vladimir Karanik

Minister of Labor and Social Protection
- In office 15 December 2016 – 27 January 2017
- President: Alexander Lukashenko
- Prime Minister: Andrei Kobyakov
- Preceded by: Marianna Shchetkina
- Succeeded by: Irina Kostevich

Personal details
- Born: 3 June 1966 (age 60)
- Party: Belaya Rus

Valery Anatolyevich Malashko (Russian: Валерий Анатольевич Малашко; born 3 June 1966) is a Belarusian politician serving as a member of the House of Representatives since 2024. From 2017 to 2019, he served as minister of health. From 2016 to 2017, he served as minister of labor and social protection.

Prior to entering politics, he worked as an anesthesiologist-resuscitator. From 1993 to 1997, he held the position of deputy chief physician for medical issues at Mogilev Regional Children's Hospital, before serving as the institution's chief physician from 1997 until 2004.
