= National Statistical Committee of the Republic of Belarus =

Belarus' principal government institution in charge of statistics and census data

- Нацыянальны статыстычны камітэт Рэспублікі Беларусь
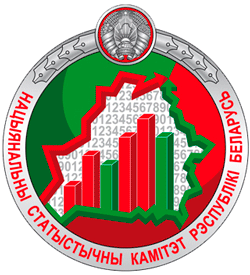

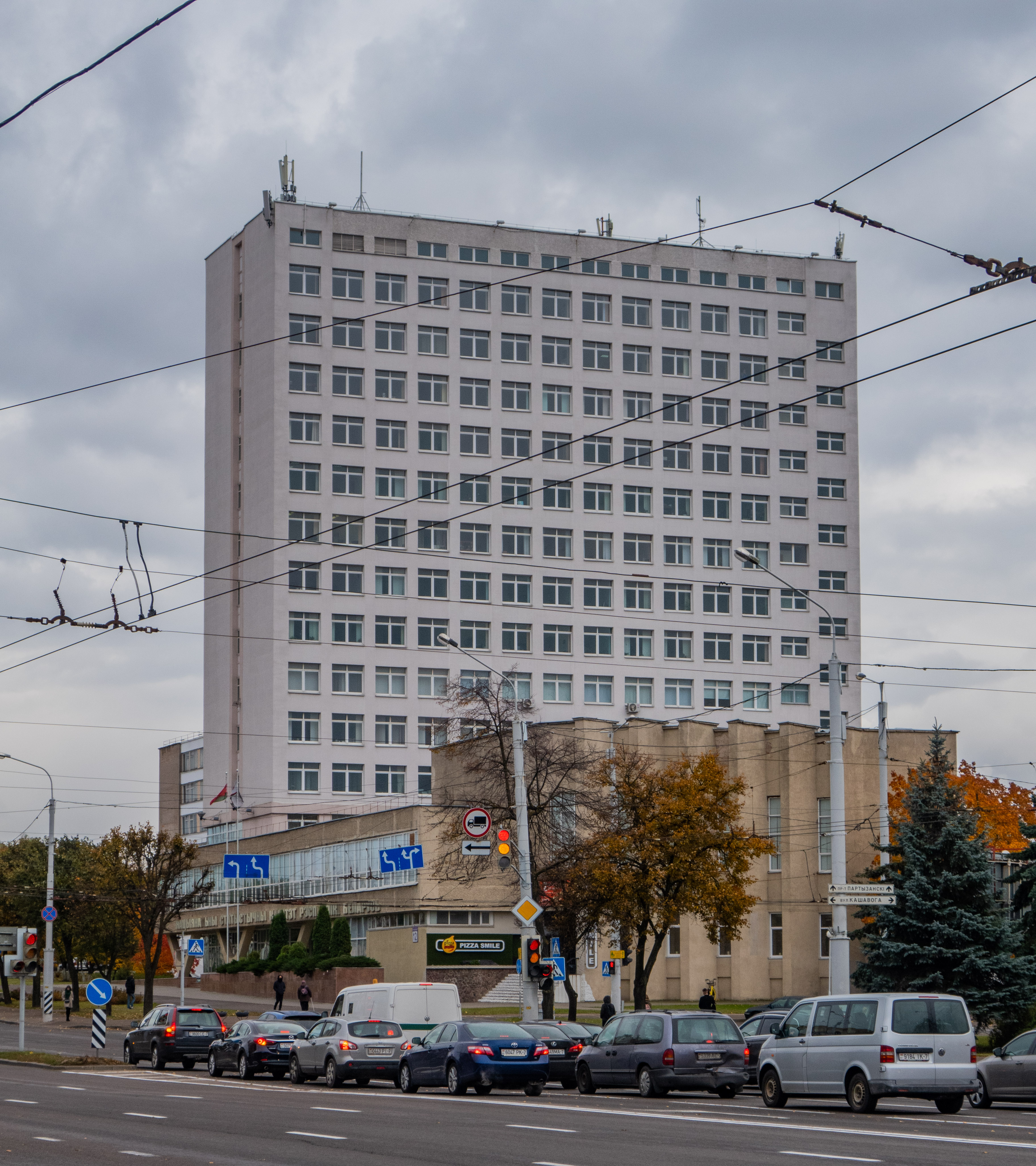
- Belstat headquarters in Minsk

Agency overview
- Website: www.belstat.gov.by/en/

National Statistical Committee of the Republic of Belarus (official abbreviation — Belstat; Belarusian: Нацыянальны статыстычны камітэт Рэспублікі Беларусь, romanized: Nacyjanaĺny statystyčny kamitet Respubliki Bielaruś; Russian: Национальный статистический комитет Республики Беларусь) is a Belarusian government organization responsible for the collection, analysis and publication of the national statistics.

== History ==
History of Belstat goes back to 1919 when the Minsk regional statistical bureau was transformed into the Central statistical department of the Belarusian SSR. This organization was reorganized many times in the Soviet era. In 1991, the State Committee of Statistics and Analysis of Belarusian SSR was reorganized into the eponymous organization of the Republic of Belarus. In 1994, the Committee was reorganized into the Ministry of statistics and analysis, in 2008 it was reorganized into the National Statistical Committee of the Republic of Belarus.

== Activities ==
Belstat has 7 regional subsidiaries (one in every voblast (region) and in Minsk) which collect data from the legal entities based in the region. The committee and its predecessors were involved in organizing and conduction of censuses during the Soviet era (1926, 1937, 1939, 1959, 1970, 1979, 1989) and in the independent Belarus (1999, 2009, 2019). National Archives of Belarus keeps c. 1500 volumes of documents of 1926 census which contain valuable genealogical information.

== Criticism ==
Belstat is often criticized for the lack of transparency. In 2020—2021, Belstat stopped to publish some of the statistical information, presumably for political reasons.

For many years, Belstat didn't calculate the number of unemployed people in Belarus according to international standards. This feature was related to the official guideline that there is no unemployment in Belarus. As of 2021, Belstat calculates unemployment according to both national standards and International Labour Organization methods, and they differ many times. Government media usually cite the lesser of two.

In 2020—2021, Belstat was accused of hiding information about the number of deaths COVID-19 pandemic. In 2020, Belstat stopped to update information about the number of deaths, and in 2021 Belstat postponed the publishing of demographic reports and published general statistical bulletins without this basic demographic information. Belstat denied to comment this fact to journalists. In August 2021, anti-government hackers got access to several internal databases and copied them. These leaked databases became the only source of reliable information about the number of excess deaths which turned out to be 17 times higher than officially stated number of deaths from COVID-19. It was noted in September 2021 that Belarus is the only country in Europe that didn't publish the number of deaths in 2020.

After the EU, USA and several other countries imposed sectoral sanctions against Belarus, Belstat stopped to published reports about several aspects of foreign trade and industry. According to economist Kateryna Bornukova and political scientist Andrey Kazakevich, Belstat acts in accordance with the idea that the people don't need to know and discuss statistical information. Bornukova added that the government isn't interested in revealing the possible economical damage of the Western sanctions because of the official guideline "sanctions make us stronger" and also because this statistical data can show the particular ways to overcome the sanctions. Economist and demographer Anatoly Zlotnikov analysed the lack of reliable data through the established policy that "positive" statistical data is propagated and "negative" is usually avoided to read out. He also suggested that Belstat tried not to provoke panic.
