= Sergei Nalivaiko =

Belarusian politician (born 1973)

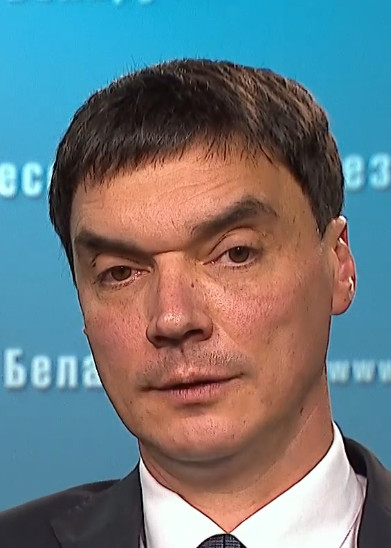
- Nalivaiko in 2020

Minister of Taxes and Duties
- In office 27 December 2014 – 2 December 2024
- President: Alexander Lukashenko
- Prime Minister: Andrei Kobyakov; Syarhey Rumas; Roman Golovchenko
- Preceded by: Vladimir Poluyan
- Succeeded by: Dmitry Kiyko

Personal details
- Born: 24 October 1973 (age 52)

Sergei Eduardovich Nalivaiko (Russian: Сергей Эдуардович Наливайко; born 24 October 1973) is a Belarusian politician serving as inspector for the Mogilev region since 2024. From 2014 to 2024, he served as minister of taxes and duties.
