= Alexander Studnev =

Belarusian politician (born 1974)

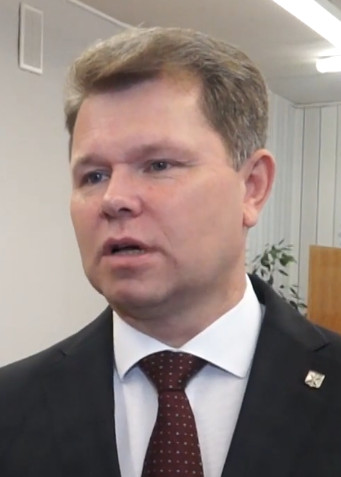
- Studnev in 2020

Minister of Architecture and Construction
- Incumbent
- Assumed office 4 March 2025
- President: Alexander Lukashenko
- Prime Minister: Roman Golovchenko; Alexander Turchin
- Preceded by: Ruslan Parkhamovich

Personal details
- Born: 17 July 1974 (age 51)

Alexander Viktorovich Studnev (Russian: Александр Викторович Студнев; born 17 July 1974) is a Belarusian politician serving as minister of architecture and construction since 2025. From 2022 to 2025, he served as mayor of Mogilev. From 2017 to 2022, he served as mayor of Babruysk.
