= Alexander Khodjaev =

Belarusian psychiatrist and politician (born 1980)

Alexander Valeryevich Khodjaev
- Алякса́ндр Вале́р’евіч Хаджа́еў; Александр Валерьевич Ходжаев
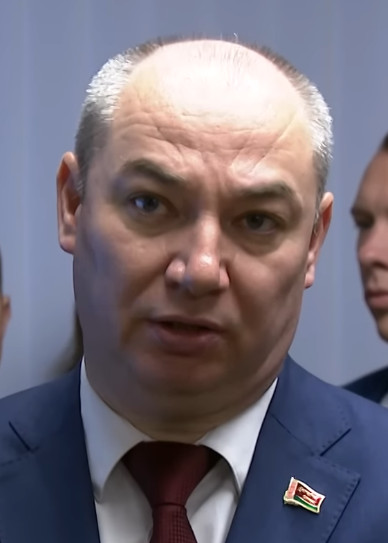
- Khodjaev in 2024

Minister of Health of the Republic of Belarus
- Incumbent
- Assumed office 25 January 2024
- President: Alexander Lukashenko
- Prime Minister: Roman Golovchenko; Alexander Turchin
- Preceded by: Dmitry Pinevich

Personal details
- Born: 1980 (age 45–46) Lyepyel, Vitebsk region, Byelorussian SSR, Soviet Union
- Education: Belarusian State Medical University; Belarusian Medical Academy of Postgraduate Education
- Occupation: Psychiatrist; Politician

Alexander Valeryevich Khodjaev (also transliterated as Aleksandr Khodjaev; Belarusian: Алякса́ндр Вале́р’евіч Хаджа́еў; born in 1980) is a Belarusian psychiatrist and politician. He is the incumbent Minister of Health of the Republic of Belarus.

== Early life ==
Khodjaev was born in 1980 in Lyepyel, then part of the Vitebsk region in the Byelorussian SSR. His father, Valery Khodjaev, worked as the chief physician of the Lepel district hospital and at the health department of the regional executive committee of Lepel. He then worked as the general director of Belmedtechnika before becoming, in 2010, the First Deputy Minister of Health, although he formally retired from the position and became general director of Pskov Pharma. In 2004, he graduated from the Belarusian State Medical University, and afterward worked as a trainee doctor at the Republican Scientific and Practical Center of Oncology and Medical Radiology named after N.N. Alexandrov. From 2005 to 2008, he was a pathologist at the center after completing his training.

From 2008 to 2011 he completed his postgraduate education in psychiatry at the Belarusian Medical Academy of Postgraduate Education while working at the 6th City Clinical Hospital in Minsk. He also obtained the specialties of medical and preventive care, psychotherapy, and health care organization there. His dissertation was on the topic of the psychotherapy of pregnant women during childbirth, which took two attempts to successfully defend. After graduating, he worked as the leading laboratory assistant at the Department of Psychotherapy and Medical Psychology at the medical academy for a year. From 2012 to 2015 he worked as an assistant at the same department, then from 2015 to 2018 was an associate professor of the department at the academy.

From 2018 to 2020 he was Chief Specialist of the Department of Medical Care Organization of the Main Department of Medical Care, Expertise, Appeals of Citizens and Legal Entities of the Ministry of Health. Afterward, from 2020 to 2021, he was the Chief Specialist of the Department of Specialized Medical Care of the Main Directorate of the Organization of Medical Care of the Ministry of Health, which also him the chief narcologist. In May 2021 he was appointed director of the Republican Scientific and Practical Center for Mental Health, which he held until his appointment to the post of Minister of Health. Around the same time he also became the chief freelance psychiatrist of the Ministry of Health. During his time there, he criticized the Western psychiatric treatment model where patients decide if they want medical service, and instead advocated for the state to immediately intervene.

== Political career ==
=== Minister of Health ===
On 25 January 2024, he was appointed Minister of Health of Belarus, succeeding Dmitry Pinevich.

A major issue in 2024 was the shortage of doctors in Belarus, which had been a problem during Pinevich's tenure. To alleviate this, Khodjaev announced the cancellation of the reconfirmation of qualification categories for medical workers at retirement age in June 2024. In February 2025, Khodjaev announced there was a positive trend in personnel, stating that his ministry, in addition to the aforementioned tactic, streamlined vacancies and admission campaigns for medical universities. Independent medical organizations like ByMedSol and the Medical Solidarity Fund, however, reported the number of personnel remained about the same.

He also began to look outward to replace foreign manufacturers of medicine following the 2022 Russian invasion of Ukraine and subsequent sanctions, importing from manufacturers in Armenia, Russia, India, China, and Bangladesh. In September 2024 he signed a memorandum of cooperation with the Ministry of Health of Russia in the field of disaster medicine and also aimed at conducting joint educational and training events.

== Personal life ==
He is married to Alla Khodjaeva, a lawyer who works at ExportMegaTrans, a cargo transportation company. They live in the town of Lesnoy near Minsk.
