= Yuri Gorlov =

Belarusian politician (born 1977)

- Юрий Горлов
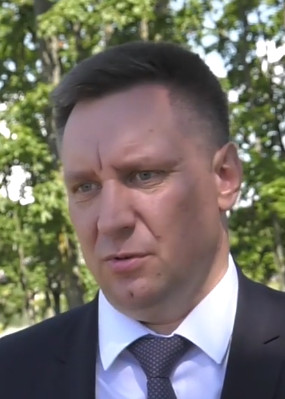
- Gorlov in 2020

Minister of Agriculture and Food
- Incumbent
- Assumed office 4 March 2025
- President: Alexander Lukashenko
- Prime Minister: Roman Golovchenko; Alexander Turchin
- Preceded by: Anatoly Linevich

Personal details
- Born: 1977 (age 48–49)

Yuri Nikolaevich Gorlov (Russian: Юрий Николаевич Горлов; born 1977) is a Belarusian politician serving as minister of agriculture and food since 2025. From 2023 to 2025, he served as inspector for the Gomel region.
