= Andrei Ivanets =

Belarusian politician (born 1984)

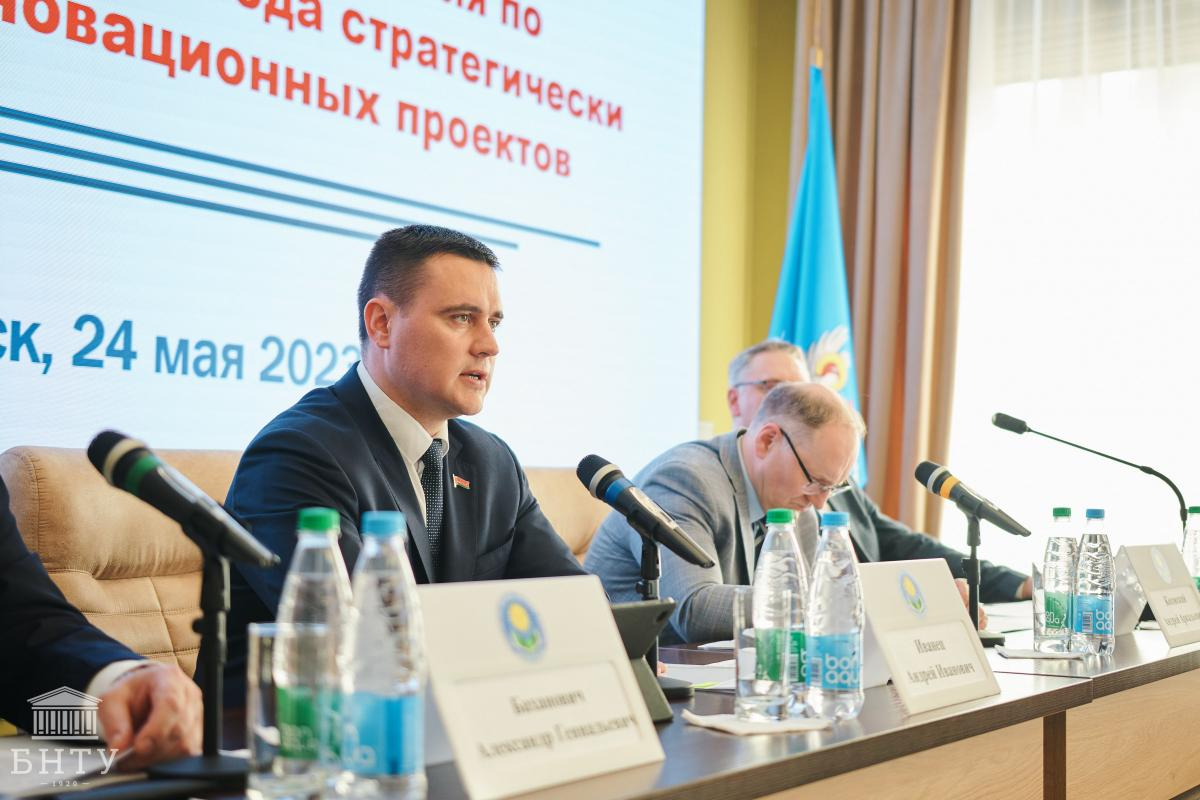
- Ivanets in 2023

Minister of Education
- Incumbent
- Assumed office 10 February 2022
- President: Alexander Lukashenko
- Prime Minister: Roman Golovchenko
- Preceded by: Igor Karpenko

Personal details
- Born: 17 September 1984 (age 41)

Andrei Ivanovich Ivanets (Russian: Андрей Иванович Иванец; born 17 September 1984) is a Belarusian politician serving as minister of education since 2022. From 2019 to 2022, he was a member of the Council of the Republic.

== Early life ==
He was born on 17 September 1984 in Minsk. He first entered the Lyceum of the Belarusian State University after becoming interested in chemistry. During his years at the lyceum, he entered international competitions in chemistry and was awarded bronze at the International Mendeleev Olympiad and the International Chemistry Olympiad. After winning his bronze awards, he became a student at the Faculty of Chemistry of the Belarusian State University (BSU), but gradually his interest in chemistry declined until meeting professor Vladimir Vasilyevich Pankov, who made him regain interest in it. In 2006 he graduated from BSU, and he started working at the Institute of General and Inorganic Chemistry of the National Academy of Sciences of Belarus.

When he was appointed Minister of Education he was working as chief scientific secretary of the National Academy of Sciences of Belarus.

== Personal life ==
Ivanets is married and has 4 children. He met his wife Kristina, a lawyer who is on the Central Committee of the Belarusian Republican Youth Union, at the contest "100 Ideas for Belarus", which she organized. He has also been active in sports, being awarded the title of Master of Sports of International Class in 2010 and in 2012 at the Classic Powerlifting World Cup setting a word record in the deadlift in the open age category at 340 kg.
