= Dmitry Kiyko =

Belarusian politician (born 1977)

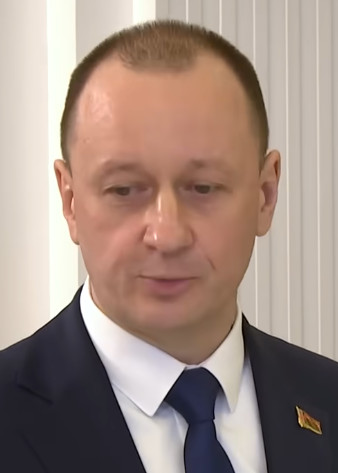
- Kiyko in 2025

Minister of Taxes and Duties
- Incumbent
- Assumed office 14 January 2025
- President: Alexander Lukashenko
- Prime Minister: Roman Golovchenko; Alexander Turchin
- Preceded by: Sergei Nalivaiko

First Deputy Minister of Fiance
- In office 2020–2025

Personal details
- Born: 15 November 1977 (age 48) Byelorussian SSR, USSR

Dzmitry Mikalaevich Kiyko (Belarusian: Дзмітрый Мікалаевіч Кійко; born 15 November 1977) is a Belarusian politician serving as minister of taxes and duties since 2025. From 2020 to 2025, he served as first deputy minister of finance.
