= Belarus–Pakistan relations =

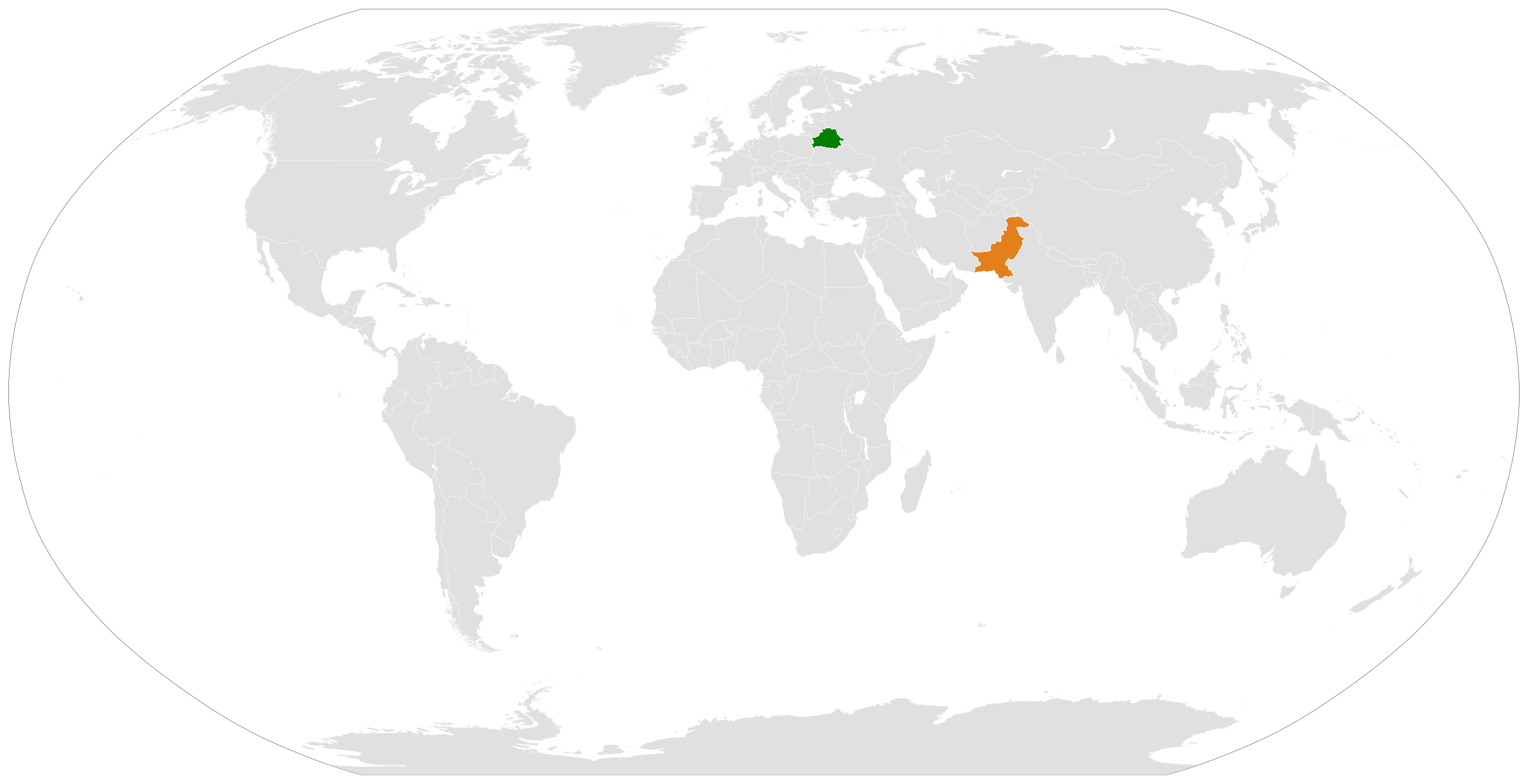

- Belarus: Pakistan

Pakistan was one of the first countries to recognise Belarus after the dissolution of the Soviet Union in 1991. Pakistan maintains an embassy in Minsk; Belarus maintains an embassy in Islamabad.

== Economic relations ==
Pakistan and Belarus initiated joint ventures (JVs) in the textile, pharmaceutical and lighting solution industries while sharing technological expertise with each other.

Pakistan's imports from Belarus stood at $42.65 million which mainly consisted of tractors (62.04%), artificial filament yarn (13.01%) and rubber tires (8.06%). Belarus has lauded Pakistan's role and efforts in bringing peace and stability to the world by countering terrorism and offered his country's full support in this fight.

In April 2025, Belarusian and Pakistani authorities announced that a deal had been made where Pakistan would send 100,000 to 150,000 specialist workers to Belarus. Belarus aims to acquire qualified workers for its manufacturing, construction and technology sectors to address its deepening labour shortage.

In October 2025, a Pakistani cement factory announced it had struck a deal with the Belarusian company Minsk Tractor Works (MTZ) to assemble MTZ tractors in the Pakistani province of Balochistan.

== State visits ==
President of Belarus Alexander Lukashenko visited Pakistan on 29 May 2015 on a two-day state visit and again on 4 October 2016. President Lukashenko held meetings with President Mamnoon Hussain and Prime minister Nawaz Sharif during the course of his visit, and a number of important agreements and memoranda of understanding were signed between the two countries.

On 11 August 2015, the Prime Minister of Pakistan Nawaz Sharif conducted a two-day state visit to Belarus.

The Prime Minister of Pakistan Imran Khan met the President Lukashenko on the sidelines of the Shanghai Cooperation Organisation held in Bishkek, Kyrgyzstan on 14 June 2019. Both heads of state agreed to hold more political exchanges and increase economic, commercial and investment cooperation.

President of Belarus Alexander Lukashenko paid a three-day visit to Pakistan from 25 to 28 November 2024. President Lukashenko was welcomed at Nur Khan Airbase by Prime Minister Shehbaz Sharif, accompanied by key cabinet ministers. Belarusian business representatives participated in a business forum where agreements worth $17 million were signed, according to Belarusian Chamber of Commerce and Industry Chairman Mikhail Myatlikov.

== Agreements ==
Pakistan and Belarus inked a number of agreements and memorandums of understanding (MoUs) to strengthen their multifaceted ties particularly in the areas of trade, commerce, education and culture.

== Pakistan Seeks Stronger Economic Ties with Belarus ==
Prime Minister Shehbaz Sharif has expressed Pakistan’s desire to deepen its economic partnership with Belarus, particularly in agricultural machinery manufacturing. During a meeting with a seven-member Belarusian delegation led by Defense Minister Lt. Gen. Victor Khrenin, the Prime Minister highlighted the growing strength of bilateral relations. The delegation also included Belarusian Ambassador Andrei Metelitsa and senior defense officials, reflecting the broadening scope of cooperation between the two countries.
