= Gennady Trubilo =

Belarusian politician (born 1971)

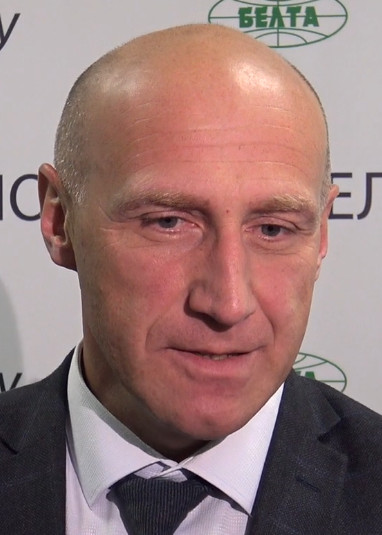
- Trubilo in 2019

Minister of Housing and Utilities
- Incumbent
- Assumed office 28 July 2023
- President: Alexander Lukashenko
- Prime Minister: Roman Golovchenko; Alexander Turchin
- Preceded by: Andrei Khmel

Personal details
- Born: 1971 (age 54–55)

Gennady Alekseevich Trubilo (Russian: Геннадий Алексеевич Трубило; born 1971) is a Belarusian politician serving as minister of housing and utilities since 2023. From 2018 to 2023, he served as first deputy minister of housing and utilities.
