= Central Election Commission of Belarus =

Government body

The Central Election Commission of the Republic of Belarus (Note: Belarusian: Цэнтральная выбарчая камісія Беларусі, romanized: Centraĺnaja vybaračaja kamisija Belarusi; Russian: Центральная избирательная комиссия Республики Беларусь, romanized: Tsentralnaya izbiratelnaya komissiya Respubliki Belarus) (CEC) is the body responsible for conducting national elections and overseeing local elections in Belarus. The CEC of Belarus is a member of the Association of Central and Eastern European Election Officials.

== International sanctions ==
On 10 April 2006, following the 2006 presidential election in Belarus, the Chairwoman of the CEC, Lidia Yermoshina, was placed on a list of over 40 members of the Belarusian government banned from entering the European Union and the United States for allegedly participating in the manipulation of the results of the presidential election; the ban was lifted in 2008. Also in 2006, Yermoshina was added to the Specially Designated Nationals and Blocked Persons List of the United States, while CEC member and Minister of Justice Oleg Slizhevsky was designated in 2007.

In 2011, Yermoshina was again sanctioned by the EU, following the 2010 presidential election. These European sanctions were lifted in 2016.

On 2 October 2020 the European Union imposed sanctions on all 12 members of the commission for violations in the August election. In the autumn of 2020, the UK, Canada and Switzerland also imposed sanctions against all CEC members. The United States imposed sanctions against CEC Deputy Chairman Vadzim Ipatau and CEC Secretary Alena Dmukhayla on 2 October 2020, and on 21 June 2021 extended them to cover the rest of the Commission members. In addition, on 23 December 2020 the Central Election Commission itself was added to the SDN list.

In March 2022, the new head of the CEC, Igor Karpenko, was added to the Canadian sanctions list. In June 2022 Karpenko was also blacklisted by the European Union; Switzerland joined these sanctions shortly thereafter.

In March 2023, Karpenko and other members of the Belarusian CEC who had joined the commission after 2020 were added to the Specially Designated Nationals and Blocked Persons List.

On January 27, 2025, the UK's Foreign Office imposed sanctions on Belarusian officials, including Karpenko, in response to the 2025 Belarusian presidential election that took place on Sunday, the day before.

== Chairpersons ==
- Alyaksandr Abramovich (1992–1996);
- Viktar Hanchar (September-October 1996);
- Lidia Yermoshina (1996–2021);
- Ihar Karpenka (since 2021)
