= Sergei Maslyak =

Belarusian politician (born 1980)

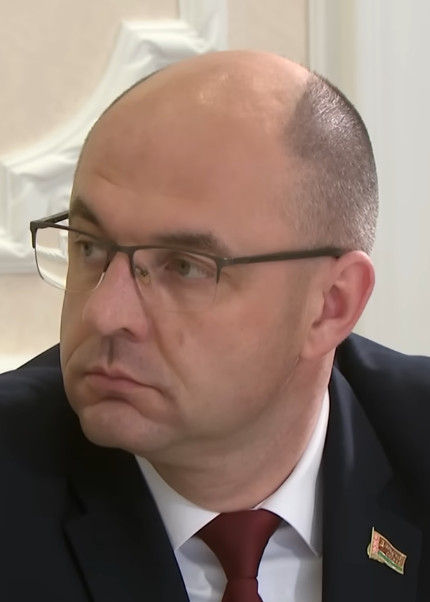
- Maslyak in 2025

Minister of Natural Resources and Environmental Protection
- Incumbent
- Assumed office 22 April 2024
- President: Alexander Lukashenko
- Prime Minister: Roman Golovchenko; Alexander Turchin
- Preceded by: Andrei Khudyk

Personal details
- Born: 8 September 1980 (age 45)

Sergei Mikhailovich Maslyak (Russian: Сергей Михайлович Масляк; born 8 September 1980) is a Belarusian politician serving as minister of natural resources and environmental protection since 2024. From 2019 to 2024, he served as mayor of the Zavodski District of Minsk.
