= Lidia Yermoshina =

Belarusian politician

- Лідзія Ярмошына
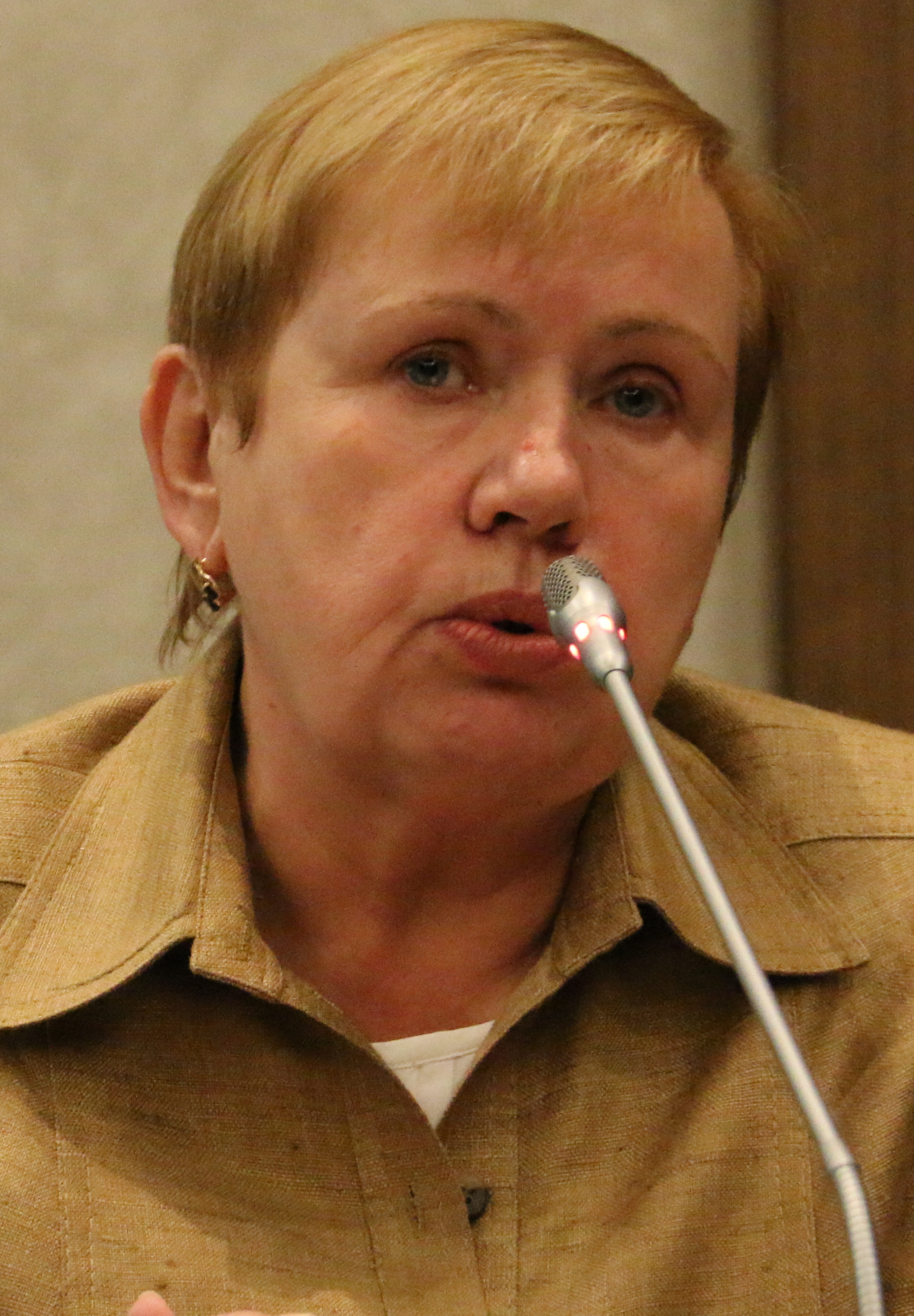
- Yermoshina in September 2016

Chairwoman of the Central Election Commission of Belarus
- In office 6 December 1996 – 13 December 2021
- President: Alexander Lukashenko
- Preceded by: Viktar Hanchar
- Succeeded by: Ihar Karpenka

Personal details
- Born: 29 January 1953 (age 73) Slutsk, Byelorussian SSR, Soviet Union (now Belarus)
- Education: Immanuel Kant Baltic Federal University

Lidia Mikhaylovna Yermoshina (Belarusian: Лідзія Міхайлаўна Ярмошына, romanized: Lidziya Mikhaylauna Yarmoshyna; Russian: Лидия Михайловна Ермошина; born 29 January 1953) is a Belarusian politician. She was a member of the Central Election Commission of Belarus (1992–1996), and Chairwoman (1996–2021).

== Biography ==
Yermoshina was born in Slutsk, Minsk Region on 29 January 1953 to a Ukrainian family. In 1975, she graduated from the Faculty of Law at the Immanuel Kant Baltic Federal University. Beginning in 1975, she worked as a legal advisor until becoming an attorney's assistant in 1987. She became Chairwoman of the Judiciary of the City Executive Committee of Babruysk in 1988, a post she held until 1996.

=== Belarusian elections ===
She has been a member of the Central Election Commission of Belarus since 1992, and Chairwoman of the organization since 1996. She was appointed by decree by Alexander Lukashenko in contradiction with the Constitution of Belarus, which stated that the candidacy of the Chairman of the CEC must be approved by the Supreme Council of Belarus. The previous Chairman, Viktar Hanchar, had been an active critic of the 1996 Belarusian referendum and was removed by Lukashenko after serving just little over a month.

In 2004, following the 2004 Belarusian parliamentary election and constitutional referendum, Yermoshina was banned from entering the European Union for allegedly participating in the manipulation of the results of the presidential election. Following the same accusations, in 2006, the United States included her in the sanction list as well. The ban was lifted in 2008.

On 15 December 2010, presidential candidate Andrei Sannikov logged a legal complaint application to the Central Election Commission of Belarus, demanding they remove Yermoshyna from her office as Chairperson of the Central Election Commission. He cited that her position was illegal, as Yermoshyna was a member of incumbent Aleksandr Lukashenko's political team, compromising her neutrality, and was under international scrutiny for purportedly rigging the previous election. The complaints were ineffective. Yermoshina was again sanctioned by the European Union in the aftermath of the 2010 election; these sanctions were suspended in 2015 and lifted in 2016.

On 9 August 2020, Yermoshina appeared on Belarusian TV to condemn the "deliberate provocations" of protest voters in the 2020 Belarusian presidential election. She also described long queues outside polling stations as an attempt at "sabotage" by the opposition.

Independent observers of the election have noted vote counting irregularities and dozens have been subject to harassment and detention. U.S. Secretary of State Mike Pompeo described the elections as "neither free nor fair." After the election and the subsequent protests, Yermoshina was banned from entering the European Union, the United Kingdom, Switzerland and Canada.

Yermoshina was replaced by the former Minister of Education Ihar Karpenka on 13 December 2021.

== Personal life ==
Lidia Yermoshina has been divorced twice, and has a son, Aleksei, who died at age 40 of unknown causes in June 2017.

== See also ==
- 1996 Belarusian referendum
- 2006 Belarusian presidential election
- 2010 Belarusian presidential election
