= Kirill Zalessky =

Belarusian politician (born 1980)

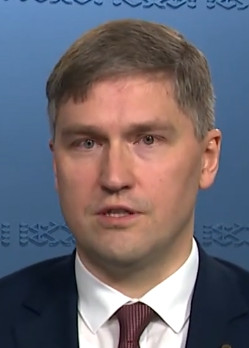
- Zalessky in 2022

Minister of Communications and Informatization
- Incumbent
- Assumed office 3 March 2025
- President: Alexander Lukashenko
- Prime Minister: Roman Golovchenko; Alexander Turchin
- Preceded by: Konstantin Shulgan

Deputy Director of the Belarus High Technologies Park
- In office 2023–2025

Personal details
- Born: 1980 (age 45–46)

Kirill Borisovich Zalessky (Russian: Кирилл Борисович Залесский; born 1980) is a Belarusian politician serving as minister of communications and informatization since 2025. From 2023 to 2025, he served as deputy director of the Belarus High Technologies Park.
