= Belmedpreparaty, RUE =

Belmedpreparaty
- Industry: Pharmaceutical
- Headquarters: Minsk, Belarus
- Key people: Andrei Schebrov
- Website: www.belmedpreparaty.com

Belmedpreparaty, RUE (called Belpharm in English) is one of the largest pharmaceutical trading companies in the Republic of Belarus. It was founded in the early 1990s as a joint venture between the Belarus health ministry and ITM Investment-Trade-Marketing GmbH to import Western pharmaceuticals following the Chernobyl disaster.
