= Sergey Kovalchuk (politician) =

Belarusian politician (born 1968)

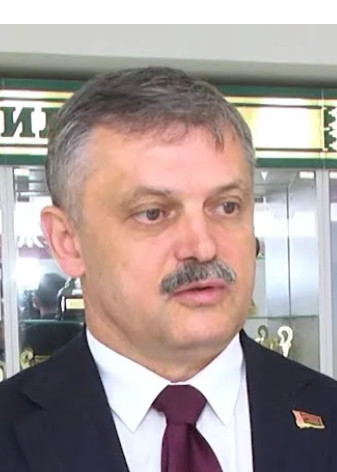
- Kovalchuk in 2024

Minister of Sports and Tourism
- Incumbent
- Assumed office 5 March 2018
- President: Alexander Lukashenko
- Prime Minister: Andrei Kobyakov; Syarhey Rumas; Roman Golovchenko; Alexander Turchin
- Preceded by: Alexander Shamko

Personal details
- Born: 14 August 1968 (age 57)

Sergey Mikhailovich Kovalchuk (Russian: Сергей Михайлович Ковальчук; born 14 August 1968) is a Belarusian politician serving as minister of sports and tourism since 2018. From 2004 to 2018, he worked at the Presidential Security Service.
