= Vladimir Karanik =

Belarusian politician (born 1973)

- Уладзімер Каранік
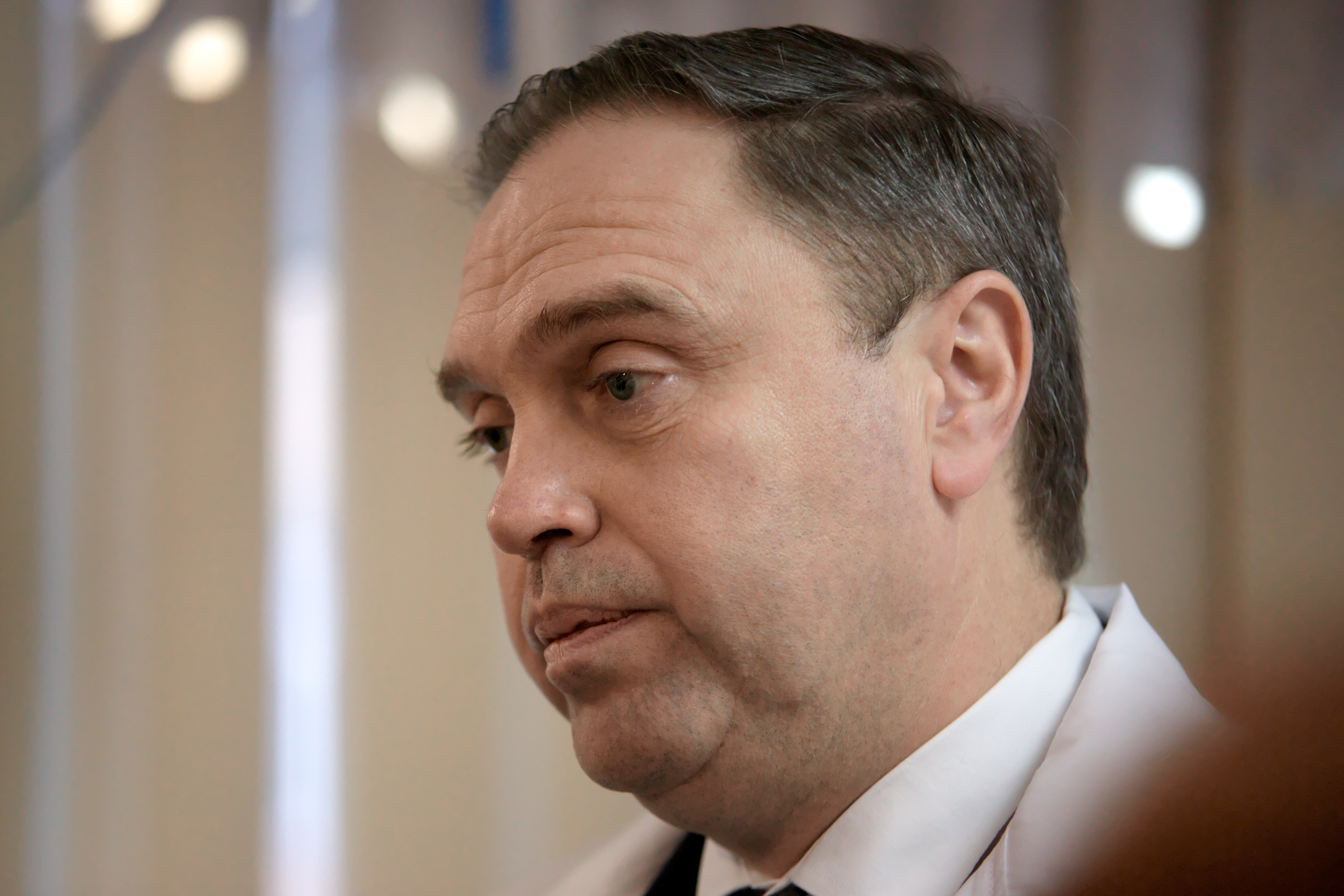
- Karanik in 2020

Governor of the Grodno Region
- In office 22 August 2020 – 3 March 2025
- President: Alexander Lukashenko
- Preceded by: Vladimir Kravtsov
- Succeeded by: Yury Karayeu

Minister of Health
- In office 11 June 2019 – 22 August 2020
- President: Alexander Lukashenko
- Prime Minister: Syarhey Rumas; Roman Golovchenko
- Preceded by: Valery Malashko
- Succeeded by: Dmitry Pinevich

Deputy Prime minister of Belarus
- Incumbent
- Assumed office 2025

Personal details
- Born: 8 January 1973 (age 53)

Vladimir Stepanovich Karanik (Russian: Владимир Степанович Караник; born 8 January 1973) is a Belarusian politician serving as deputy prime minister since 2025. Previously, he was governor of the Grodno Region (2020–2025) and minister of health (2018–2020). Prior to entering politics, he was the chief oncologist of Minsk.

In 2020–2021 Karanik was added to the sanctions lists of the European Union, the United Kingdom, Switzerland and Canada.
