= 7th All-Belarusian People's Assembly =

2024 conference of the All-Belarusian People's Assembly

- Coat of arms of Belarus
- Native name: VII Усебеларускі народны сход
- Date: 24–25 April 2024
- Venue: Palace of the Republic, Minsk
- Participants: 1,700 delegates, 200+ guests
- Outcome: Appointment of Alexander Lukashenko as Chairman, appointment of a 13-member Presidium

The 7th All-Belarusian People's Assembly (Note: Belarusian: VII Усебеларускі народны сход, romanized: VII Usiebielaruski narodny schod; Russian: VII Всебелорусское народное собрание, romanized: VII Vsebelorusskoje narodnoje sobranije) was a convention of the All-Belarusian People's Assembly, including government officials, members of state-owned enterprises, and other individuals held from 24 to 25 April 2024 in the Palace of the Republic, Minsk. The first such conference since the 2022 Belarusian constitutional referendum that established it as the "highest representative organ of the people's government of [...] Belarus", media associated with the Belarusian opposition largely described it as a further consolidation of absolute power by President Alexander Lukashenko.

== Background ==
The All-Belarusian People's Assembly was established in October 1996 by a presidential decree of Alexander Lukashenko. Prior to 2022 its role was exclusively advisory and it lacked significant powers.

As a result of the 2022 Belarusian constitutional referendum, which was internationally regarded as unfree and unfair, the All-Belarusian People's Assembly was given a constitutional role as "the highest representative organ of the people's government of the Republic of Belarus". According to Lukashenko's proposals after the referendum, the ABPA comprises 1,200 delegates elected to a five-year term. The Prime Minister of Belarus is required to report to the ABPA, and, at the request of the President, it can deploy the Armed Forces of Belarus abroad. It is additionally able to impeach the President and contest the results of elections.

The empowered ABPA has been described by independent political analysts such as Vadzim Mažejka and Arciom Šrajbman as similar to extra-parliamentary bodies in other states, such as the Politburo or Central Committee of the Communist Party of the Soviet Union, or the National People's Congress of the People's Republic of China. Pro-democracy activist Anatoly Lebedko characterised the expansion of the ABPA's authorities as consolidating a "super-presidential republic" around Lukashenko.

== Membership ==
Under the 2022 constitution, 412 people, slightly over a third of the total of ABPA, are official political elites (parliamentarians, Cabinet members, heads of regional and municipal committees, and judges of the Constitutional and Supreme Courts). A second approximate third are members of local councils ("soviets"). The final approximate third consists of members of government-organized non-governmental organizations (GONGOs), supposedly representing civil society.

== Assembly ==
The assembly began on 24 April 2024. That evening, Lukashenko was appointed as Chairman of the ABPA with all but one vote (Natalya Kochanova) in favour. Aliaksandr Kosiniec, former Chief of Staff to the President of Belarus, was selected as deputy chairman.

The assembly was marked by more jingoistic rhetoric on the part of Lukashenko and other delegates, urging Belarus to prepare for war. Independent analyst Valier Karbalievič claimed that this was an effort by Lukashenko to encourage the larger population to support him, threatening Belarusian involvement in the Russian invasion of Ukraine in an effort to rally the people to his side.

=== Presidium ===
A thirteen-member presidium was selected by unanimous vote, together with Lukashenko and Kosieniec as chair and deputy chair of the presidium.

Members of the Presidium of the All-Belarusian People's Assembly
Name	Belarusian	Russian	Birth	Representation
Vadzim Bohuš	Вадзім Богуш	Вадим Богуш	1975	Minsk
Aliaksandr Brancevič	Аляксандр Бранцэвіч	Александр Бранцевич	1979	Vitebsk Region
Kanstancin Burak	Канстанцін Бурак	Константин Бурак	?	Government
Dzmitryj Čarniakoŭ	Дзмітрый Чарнякоў	Дмитрий Черняков	?	State-owned enterprises (Gomel Chemical Factory)
Nadzieja Jermakova	Надзея Ермакова	Надежда Ермакова	1953	Civil society (Belarusian Union of Women)
Uladzimir Karanik	Уладзімір Каранік	Владимир Караник	1973	Governors (Grodno Region)
Maryna Liančeŭskaja	Марына Лянчэўская	Марина Ленчевская	1971	Legislature (House of Representatives)
Siarhiej Paliakoŭ	Сяргей Палякоў	Сергей Поляков	?	Doctors
Siarhiej Siviec	Сяргей Сівец	Сергей Сивец	1973	Legislature (Council of the Republic)
Volha Špilieŭskaja	Вольга Шпілеўская	Ольга Шпилевская	?	Civil society (Belarusian Union of Women)
Ruslan Strachar	Руслан Страхар	Руслан Страхар	?	Mogilev Region
Juryj Šuliejka	Юрый Шулейка	Юрий Шулейко	1968	Governors (Brest Region)
Iryna Tyliec	Ірына Тылец	Ирина Тылец	?	Supreme Court

== Analysis ==
According to Jakob Wöllenstein of the Konrad Adenauer Foundation, the changes in ABPA as a result of the 2022 referendum were mainly the effect of negotiation with Russian President Vladimir Putin, who viewed the changes as likely to increase the role of pro-Russian politicians in Belarus. Wöllenstein viewed the actual effect as being seen by Lukashenko as likely to keep ABPA under his own control so that he would remain de facto leader after formally relinquishing the presidency.

In speeches at the April 2024 meeting, Lukashenko's view on the responsibility of ABPA consisted of general statements, such as "how we should continue to live, how we should develop, based on what values we should raise our children and build our social relations", and specific statements of the powers that ABPA lacked. He stated that ABPA does not have the power to replace state bodies or interfere with them. Wöllenstein viewed the effect as providing Lukashenko with a "dormant organ" that would justify retaining power if someone else were elected President of Belarus.

According to Wöllenstein, observers described the 7th Assembly as "reminiscent of the late Brezhnev era: thunderous applause, demonstrative unity, the creation of a dual role for the head of state and a growing personality cult around a ruler in poor health who is of retirement age and who primarily flaunts his own successes and achievements".

== Opposition reactions ==
Pavel Latushko, head of the opposition National Anti-Crisis Management group, referred to delegates to the assembly as "so-called delegates", and expressed the position that the ABPA was "a joke". Latushko also argued that the ABPA was a "transition of government" leading to annexation into Russia, a view shared by Lebedko.
