= 7th Council of the Republic of Belarus =

Convocation of Belarus' upper house of Parliament

Council of the Republic of the National Assembly of the Republic of Belarus of the 7th convocation
←	6th convocation	8th convocation	→
- Parties in the Council of the Republic

Overview
- Legislative body: Council of the Republic of the National Assembly
- Jurisdiction: Belarus
- Meeting place: Krasnoarmeyskaya 9, Minsk
- Term: 6 December 2019 –
- Website: sovrep.gov.by
- Members: 60
- Chairwoman: Natalya Kochanova
- Deputy Chairman: Anatoly Isachenko

Council of the Republic of the National Assembly of the Republic of Belarus of the 7th convocation (Belarusian: Савет Рэспублікі Нацыянальнага сходу Рэспублікі Беларусь VII склікання) is the current convocation of the upper house of the Belarusian Parliament, elected in indirect elections by the regional Councils of Deputies on 7 November 2019.

On 12 November 2019, at a meeting of the Central Commission of the Republic of Belarus for elections and holding republican referendums, the results of the elections of members of the Council of the Republic of the National Assembly of the Republic of Belarus of the seventh convocation were established. Eight members of the Council of the Republic were elected from each region, the city of Minsk, and 4 more members were appointed by the President of the Republic of Belarus. A total of 60 members of the Council of the Republic were elected.

== Formation procedure ==
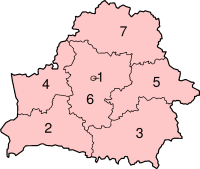
Map of the Republic of Belarus, numbers indicate: 1 - the city of Minsk; 2 - Brest Region; 3 - Gomel Region; 4 - Grodno Region; 5 - Mogilev Region; 6 - Minsk Region; 7 - Vitebsk Region

The Council of the Republic is the chamber of territorial representation. In accordance with part two of Article 91 of the Constitution of the Republic of Belarus, eight members of the Council of the Republic are elected from each region and the city of Minsk by secret ballot at meetings of deputies of local Councils, deputies of the base level of each region and the city of Minsk. Eight members of the Council of the Republic are appointed by the President of the Republic of Belarus.

In accordance with the Constitution of the Republic of Belarus, elections of a new composition of the Council of the Republic are appointed by the President of the Republic of Belarus no later than four months and are held no later than 30 days before the end of the powers of the Council of the Republic of the current convocation. Extraordinary elections of the Council of the Republic are held within three months from the date of early termination of its powers.

A citizen of the Republic of Belarus who has reached the age of 30 and has lived in the territory of the relevant region, the city of Minsk for at least five years may be a member of the Council of the Republic. A member of the Council of the Republic cannot be a member of the House of Representatives or a member of the Government at the same time; it is not allowed to combine the duties of a member of the Council of the Republic with the simultaneous holding of the position of the President of the Republic of Belarus or a judge.

The first session of the Council of the Republic after the elections is convened by the Central Commission for Elections and Republican Referendums and begins its work no later than 30 days after the elections.

== Composition ==
=== Leadership ===
- Natalya Kochanova — Chairwoman of the Council of the Republic of the National Assembly of the Republic of Belarus
- Anatoly Isachenko — Deputy Chairman of the Council of the Republic of the National Assembly of the Republic of Belarus.

=== Presidium of the Council of the Republic ===
- Viktor Liskovich — Chairman of the Standing Commission of the Council of the Republic of the National Assembly of the Republic of Belarus on Education, Science, Culture and Social Development
- Sergey Rachkov — Chairman of the Standing Committee of the Council of the Republic of the National Assembly of the Republic of Belarus on International Affairs and National Security
- Tatyana Runets — Chairwoman of the Standing Commission of the Council of the Republic of the National Assembly of the Republic of Belarus on Economy, Budget and Finance
- Mikhail Rusy — Chairman of the Standing Commission of the Council of the Republic of the National Assembly of the Republic of Belarus on Regional Policy and Local Self-Government
- Sergei Sivets — Chairman of the Standing Committee of the Council of the Republic of the National Assembly of the Republic of Belarus on Legislation and State Building.

== Composition ==
The Council of the Republic of the National Assembly of the Republic of Belarus of the 7th convocation consists of the following members:

Region	Deputy	Party	Birth year	Notes
Brest	Aleksandr Karpitsky	Independent	1960	
Brest	Vasily Markevich	Independent	1958	
Brest	Yuri Narkevich	Independent	1964	
Brest	Grigory Prostosovitsky	Independent	1961	
Brest	Irina Sachkovskaya	Independent	1968	
Brest	Vladimir Khrolenko	Independent	1963	
Brest	Tamara Shatlikova	Independent	1961	
Brest	Anatoly Sholtanyuk	Independent	1962	
Vitebsk	Dmitry Demidov	Independent	1975	
Vitebsk	Yuri Derkach	Independent	1962	
Vitebsk	Oleg Zhingel	Independent	1967	
Vitebsk	Irina Levkovich	Independent	1964	
Vitebsk	Vladimir Matveyev	Independent	1964	
Vitebsk	Yelena Pantyukhova	Independent	1972	
Vitebsk	Tatyana Polushkina	Independent	1957	
Vitebsk	Anatoly Shchastny	Independent	1961	
Gomel	Tatyana Abel	Independent	1964	
Gomel	Vladimir Kotovich	Independent	1962	
Gomel	Aleksandr Lyakhov	Independent	1962	
Gomel	Alexey Neverov	Independent	1973	
Gomel	Oleg Slinko	Independent	1975	
Gomel	Alla Smolyak	Communist Party	1973	
Gomel	Andrey Shishkin	Independent	1972	
Gomel	Feliks Yashkov	Independent	1964	
Grodno	Valentin Bayko	Independent	1969	
Grodno	Igor Gedich	Independent	1971	
Grodno	Viktor Liskovich	Independent	1960	Presidium member
Grodno	Oleg Romanov	Independent	1975	
Grodno	Yekaterina Serafinovich	Independent	1965	
Grodno	Viktor Snezhitsky	Independent	1959	Resigned on 8 October 2020
Grodno	Elvira Soroko	Independent	1968	
Grodno	Aleksandr Shishko	Independent	1959	
Minsk	Aleksandr Bachilo	Independent	1961	
Minsk	Valery Gaidukevich	Independent	1953	
Minsk	Ivan Golovaty	Independent	1976	
Minsk	Yelena Zyablikova	Independent	1967	
Minsk	Kalina Kaputskaya	Independent	1975	
Minsk	Vladimir Lukyanov	Independent	1972	
Minsk	Oleg Sukonko	Independent	1951	
Minsk	Natalya Yakubitskaya	Independent	1971	
Mogilev	Viktor Ananich	Independent	1963	
Mogilev	Segey Anyukhovsky	Independent	1980	
Mogilev	Dmitry Voronyuk	Independent	1987	
Mogilev	Oleg Dyachenko	Independent	1971	
Mogilev	Igor Kasko	Independent	1971	
Mogilev	Aleksei Kushnarenko	Independent	1975	
Mogilev	Valery Polischuk	Independent	1963	
Mogilev	Oleg Portnik	Independent	1959	
Minsk City	Konstantin Drozdovsky	Independent	1974	
Minsk City	Andrey Ivanets	Independent	1984	
Minsk City	Marina Ilyina	Independent	1970	
Minsk City	Oleg Rummo	Independent	1970	
Minsk City	Tatyana Runets	Independent	1969	Presidium member
Minsk City	Andrey Rusakovich	Independent	1965	
Minsk City	Sergei Sivets	Independent	1973	Presidium member
Minsk City	Viktor Chaychits	Independent	1960	
Appointed by President	Anatoly Isachenko	Independent	1966	Presidium member, Deputy Chairman
Appointed by President	Natalya Kochanova	Independent	1960	Presidium member, Chairwoman
Appointed by President	Sergey Rachkov	Independent	1960	Presidium member
Appointed by President	Mikhail Rusy	Agrarian Party	1954	Presidium member
Appointed by President	Dzmitry Baskau	Independent	1978	

== See also ==
- 7th House of Representatives of Belarus
