= Presidium of the All-Belarusian People's Assembly =

Leading body of the All-Belarusian People's Assembly

Information
- Chairman: Alexander Lukashenko
- Elected by: All-Belarusian People's Assembly
- Responsible to: All-Belarusian People's Assembly
- Seats: 15

The Presidium of the All-Belarusian People's Assembly (Note: Belarusian: Прэзідыум Усебеларускага народнага сходу, romanized: Prezidjum Usiebielaruskaha narodnaha schodu; Russian: Президиум Всебелорусского народного собрания, romanized: Prezidium Vsebelorusskogo narodnogo sobranija) is the leadership organ of the All-Belarusian People's Assembly. Comprising 15 members as of 2024 (including Chairman Alexander Lukashenko and deputy chairman Alexander Kosiniec), the presidium has been described by some independent analysts as the most significant indicator of Belarus's leading political figures, and possesses significant authority. It was established as a result of the 2022 Belarusian constitutional referendum, and its membership was selected during the 7th All-Belarusian People's Assembly in April 2024.

== History ==
Following the 2022 Belarusian constitutional referendum, regarded by the international community as unfree and unfair, the All-Belarusian People's Assembly, which had previously been an ad hoc body, was enshrined in the Constitution of Belarus as the "highest representative organ of the people's government of the Republic of Belarus" and given newfound powers.

As a result of changes proposed by President Alexander Lukashenko, the ABPA was given a presidium. The presidium was elected on 24 April 2024 as part of the 7th All-Belarusian People's Assembly.

== Authority ==
The powers of the Presidium include the right to contest the legitimacy of presidential and parliamentary elections, the approval of judges proposed by the Presidential Administration of Belarus for the Supreme and Constitutional courts, and impeach the President of Belarus for "committing state treason or another such crime." (Note: Russian: признаков совершения им государственной измены или иного тяжкого преступления.) It additionally maintains the right to declare a state of emergency or martial law and the authority to grant state awards. The Presidium is required to meet at least once every six months, compared to the ABPA, which is required to meet yearly.

The Presidium has been described by political analyst Arciom Šrajbman as being similar to a politburo in that it demonstrates the closest members of Lukashenko's inner circle. Following the reveal of the Presidium's membership, Pavel Slunkin of the European Council on Foreign Relations stated that while international observers no longer had to speculate on Lukashenko's closest associates, he had still played it safe by selecting individuals with "limited political stature".

== Members ==
The Presidium comprises fifteen members, including the Chairman and his deputy. Its membership was elected on 24 April 2024 at the 7th All-Belarusian People's Assembly.

Members of the Presidium of the All-Belarusian People's Assembly
Name	Belarusian	Russian	Birth	Representation
Alexander Lukashenko	Аляксандaр Лукашэнка	Александр Лукашенко	1954	N/A (chairman)
Alexander Kosiniec	Аляксандaр Косінец	Александр Косинец	1959	N/A (deputy chairman)
Vadzim Bohuš	Вадзім Богуш	Вадим Богуш	1975	Minsk
Alexander Brancevič	Аляксандр Бранцэвіч	Александр Бранцевич	1979	Vitebsk Region
Kanstancin Burak	Канстанцін Бурак	Константин Бурак	?	Government
Zimicier Čarniakow	Зіміцер Чарнякоў	Дмитрий Черняков	?	State-owned enterprises (Gomel Chemical Factory)
Nadezhda Yermakova	Надзея Ермакова	Надежда Ермакова	1953	Civil society (Women's Union of Belarus)
Uładzimier Karanik	Уладзімeр Каранік	Владимир Караник	1973	Governors (Grodno Region)
Maryna Liančewskaja	Марына Лянчэўская	Марина Ленчевская	1971	Legislature (House of Representatives)
Siarhiej Paliakow	Сяргей Палякоў	Сергей Поляков	?	Doctors
Siarhiej Siviec	Сяргей Сівец	Сергей Сивец	1973	Legislature (Council of the Republic)
Volha Špiliewskaja	Вольга Шпілеўская	Ольга Шпилевская	?	Civil society (Belarusian Union of Women)
Rusłan Strachar	Руслан Страхар	Руслан Страхар	?	Mogilev Region
Juryj Šuliejka	Юрый Шулейка	Юрий Шулейко	1968	Governors (Brest Region)
Iryna Tyliec	Ірына Тылец	Ирина Тылец	?	Supreme Court
