= Ludmila Hraznova =

Belarusian economist, politician, and human rights defender

- Людміла Гразнова (Belarusian)

Legislator of the Supreme Council of Belarus
- In office 9 January 1996 – 9 January 2001
- Succeeded by: Elections not held

Chair of the Belarusian Human Rights Alliance
- Incumbent
- Assumed office 9 December 2003
- Preceded by: Organization established

Deputy Chair of the United Civic Party
- In office 2004 – April 2008

Deputy Chair of the United Democratic Party of Belarus
- In office 1992 – 1 October 1995
- Succeeded by: Position abolished

Personal details
- Born: Ludmila Prakapienka; June 8, 1953 (age 73) Dzyarzhynsk
- Party: United Civic Party, United Democratic Party of Belarus
- Education: Belarusian State University
- Occupation: Economist, politician, human rights defender

Ludmila Mikalaeuna Hraznova (née Prakapienka; Belarusian: Людміла Мікалаеўна Гразнова; Russian: Людмила Николаевна Грязнова; born 8 June 1953 in Dzyarzhynsk) is a Belarusian economist, opposition politician, and human rights defender. She holds a Candidate of Sciences degree in economics and served as a legislator of the Supreme Council of Belarus during its 13th convocation. Since 2003, she has been the chair of the Belarusian Human Rights Alliance. She was deputy chair of the United Democratic Party of Belarus from 1992 to 1995 and of the United Civic Party from 2004 to 2008.

Hraznova was among the Supreme Council members who signed a motion for the impeachment of President Alexander Lukashenko. Since 1997, she has participated in court proceedings, supporting politically persecuted individuals. She has been arrested multiple times for participating in demonstrations and was recognized by Amnesty International as a prisoner of conscience.

== Biography ==
=== Early life and family ===
Ludmila Hraznova was born on 8 June 1953 in Dzyarzhynsk, Minsk region, within the Byelorussian Soviet Socialist Republic of the Soviet Union. At the time, her parents resided in the village of Putchyna, located 20 km from Dzyarzhynsk. The family later moved to Fanipal, Plyeshchanitsy, and eventually Starobin. Her father, Mikalai Fiodaravich Prakapienka, was a member of the Communist Party. Due to frequent cadre rotations, he was transferred to various parts of the republic, necessitating family relocations. In Starobin, he served as the First Secretary of the Starobin District Committee of the Communist Party of Byelorussia. Ludmila's earliest memories stem from Starobin. In 1965, the family moved to Minsk, where her father worked in the Ministry of Agriculture of the Byelorussian Soviet Socialist Republic. He later served as First Secretary of the Communist Party's Regional Committee, headed a research institute on agricultural issues, and retired as a sector chief. On 24 December 2004, Mikalai Prakapienka passed away.

=== Education and academic career ===
Hraznova began her education in Starobin. After moving to Minsk in 1965, she attended the prestigious School No. 42. She excelled in painting and drawing and initially considered studying architecture but ultimately chose political economy. She graduated from the Faculty of Political Science at Belarusian State University in 1975, earning a degree in economics and becoming a lecturer in political economy. From 1975 to 1977, she pursued postgraduate studies in the field of "political economy of socialism". During this time, she later stated, "I quickly realized that such a science did not exist, but those were the rules of the game, and I had to accept them". She also completed an internship in Hungary. In 1980, she earned a Candidate of Sciences degree in economics in Minsk, with her dissertation titled Socialization of Labor as a Factor in Improving the Structure of the Socialist Production Collective. She worked as a lecturer and docent in the Department of Economic Sciences at Belarusian State University.

== Political career ==
With the advent of perestroika and democratic changes in the Byelorussian Soviet Socialist Republic, Hraznova shifted from academia to politics. She joined the United Democratic Party of Belarus, founded in 1990, and became its deputy chair in 1992 under Alexander Dabravolski. On 1 October 1995, the United Democratic Party of Belarus merged with the Civic Party to form the United Civic Party, and Hraznova joined the new party's Political Council.

=== Service in the Supreme Council ===
In the second round of the supplementary parliamentary elections on 10 December 1995, Hraznova was elected to the Supreme Council of Belarus for its 13th convocation, representing Minsk's Zakharauski Electoral District No. 239. She was registered by the Central Election Commission of Belarus on 19 December 1995 and sworn in as a legislator on 9 January 1996. From 23 January 1996, she served as a member and later deputy chair of the Standing Committee on Budget, Taxes, Banks, and Finance. She joined the opposition "Civic Action" faction, which opposed President Alexander Lukashenko. From 3 June 1996, she was a member of the Supreme Council's working group for cooperation with the Parliament of Lithuania. Hraznova was among the deputies who signed a motion to impeach Lukashenko and one of three, alongside Alexander Dabravolski and Stanislav Bogdankevich, who opposed the formation of a union between Belarus and Russia.

Following a controversial and partially unrecognized constitutional change by Lukashenko on 27 November 1996, Hraznova did not join the newly formed House of Representatives of Belarus of the National Assembly. Her mandate in the Supreme Council, per the 1994 Belarusian Constitution, ended on 9 January 2001, and no further elections to the Supreme Council were held.

=== Later political activities ===
From 2004, Hraznova served as deputy chair of the United Civic Party, overseeing its human rights section with support from party leader Anatoly Lebedko. During the first Congress of Democratic Forces in autumn 2005, she proposed Lebedko as the opposition's unified candidate for the 2006 presidential election. However, she later publicly supported his rival, Alaksandar Milinkievič, citing his consistent defense of Belarusian interests and commitment to the voluntary sector. In April 2008, she resigned as deputy chair due to "differences in views on current politics with the party leadership". She briefly focused entirely on human rights advocacy, citing stagnation in Belarusian politics and a desire to find a new approach to remain politically active. She remained a United Civic Party member and ran for party chair in July 2018 but lost, receiving 4 out of 93 delegate votes.

Hraznova ran unsuccessfully in several Belarusian elections. In the 2004 parliamentary election, she ran for the House of Representatives (3rd convocation) from Minsk's Partyzanski Electoral District No. 110 but did not win a seat. She attempted to run in the 2007 local elections for the Minsk City Council from the Piershamaiski Electoral District No. 53 but was not registered due to invalid signatures from other districts. She also ran unsuccessfully in the 2008 parliamentary election. Independent Belarusian media reported these elections as undemocratic, with only government-approved candidates elected.

== Human rights advocacy ==
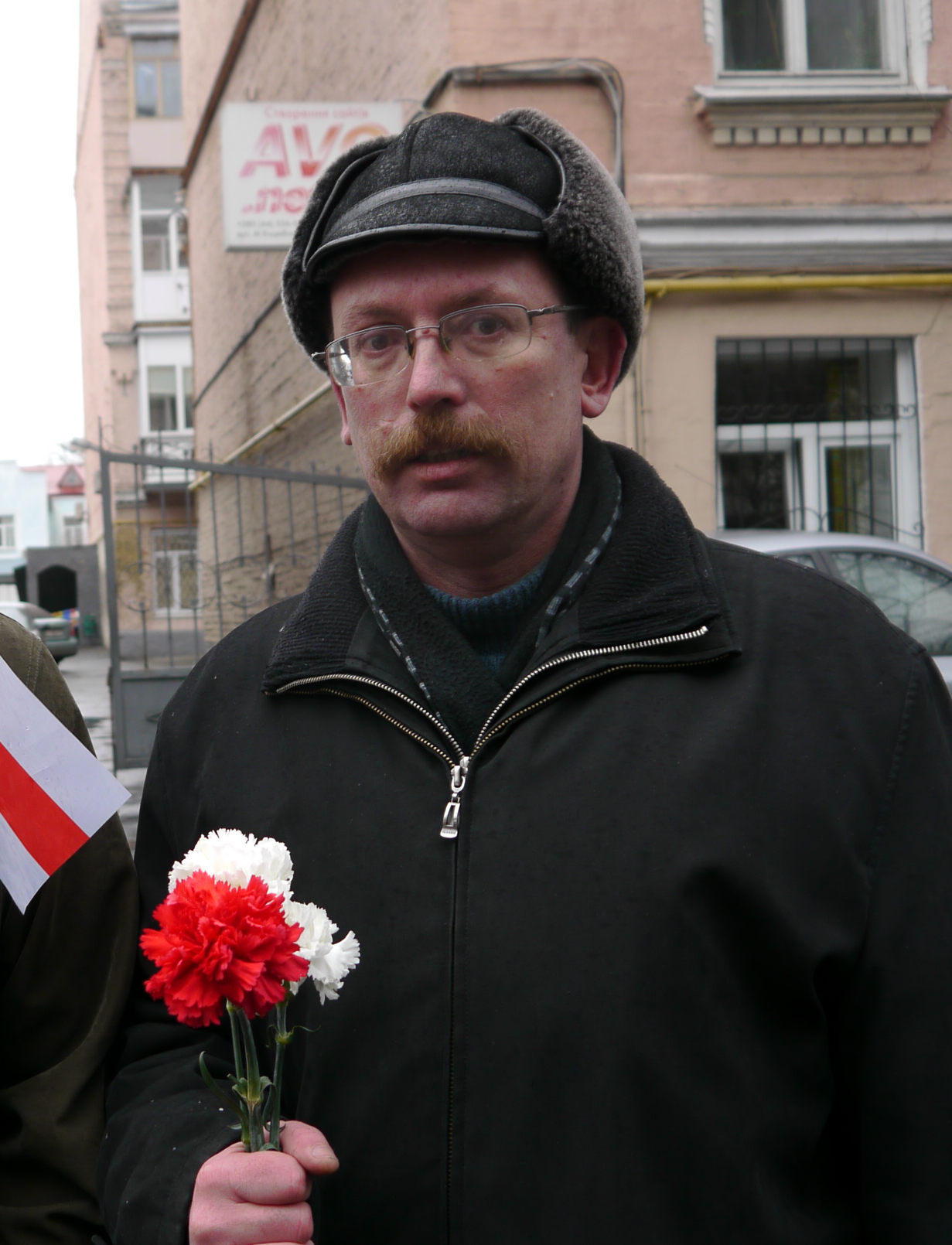
Vyacheslav Siuchyk, in whose defense Hraznova collected signatures

Beyond politics, Hraznova is deeply engaged in defending human rights and supporting non-governmental organizations. In 1996, she began advocating for arrested oppositionists Vyacheslav Siuchyk and Yury Khadyka, considered among the first victims of Lukashenko's political persecution after poet Slavamir Adamovich. They were also among the first to undertake a politically motivated hunger strike. As a Supreme Council member, Hraznova, at Siuchyk's mother's request, collected over 50 signatures from mostly opposition deputies for their release, a significant achievement given the parliament's relative independence at the time. The case was resolved in spring 1997.

Hraznova was a member of the Organizing Committee of the Charter 97 civic initiative. Since 1997, she has attended over 200 court proceedings by 2010, which she believed involved political persecution. She provides emotional and moral support to defendants, shares information, and communicates with their families, helping them understand that the accused are victims of persecution rather than criminals. She also supports families of those sentenced to death penalty.

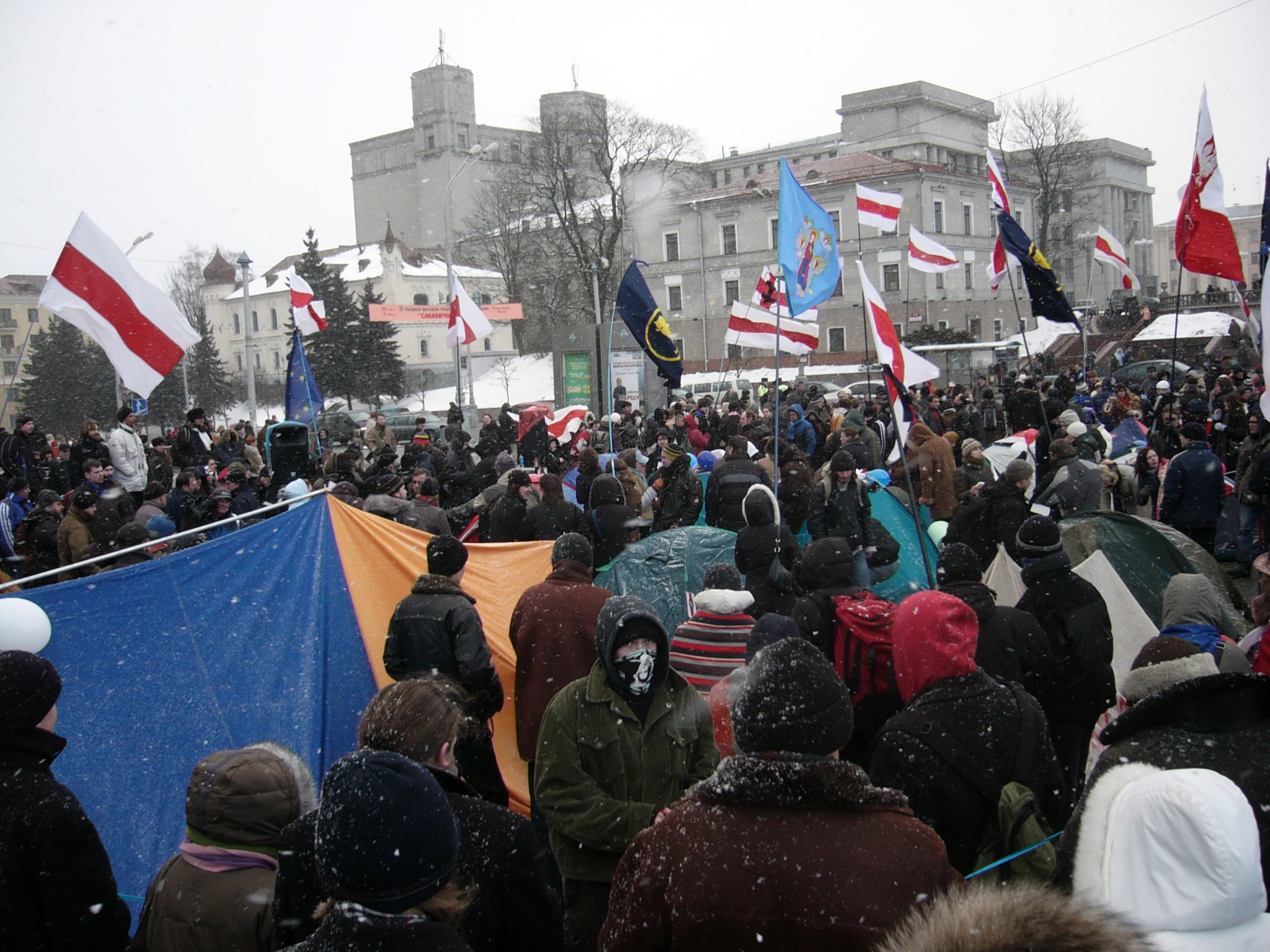
Hraznova's organization assisted those arrested after the 2006 election protests

On 9 December 2003, Hraznova became chair of the newly established Belarusian Human Rights Alliance. Registered in Lithuania due to political barriers in Belarus, the organization aims to defend the rights of those facing judicial persecution, promote legal education, and foster conditions for the rule of law. It organizes events like the "Belarus in the European Context" competition and various informational and educational projects.

Following the 2006 presidential election, Hraznova and her organization supported over 1,000 individuals arrested or harmed during the crackdown on a tent camp protest in Minsk against alleged electoral fraud. Amid widespread political repression in the mid-2000s, her organization provided extensive assistance. Hraznova described the effort: "The workload was enormous. We were literally acting as medics on a battlefield, collecting the wounded".

== Participation in protests and arrests ==
Hraznova has been detained and arrested multiple times for organizing and participating in protests. On 17 October 1999, she was detained during the "Freedom March", a peaceful opposition protest against Lukashenko's decision to postpone the 1999 presidential election to 2001. On 24 March 2002, she was detained for participating in an unregistered protest in Minsk on Freedom Day. On 12 March 2003, she co-organized the People's March "For a Better Life!" in Minsk, a peaceful protest with economic demands, including lower utility fees, higher wages, pensions, and better business conditions. Hraznova and co-organizers Andrei Sannikov, Dmitry Bondarenko, and Leanid Malakhau were each sentenced to 15 days in detention. Amnesty International recognized them as prisoners of conscience, and dozens of Belarusian activists, politicians, cultural figures, scholars, artists, and journalists signed a petition for their release.

== Views ==
Hraznova sees political activity and human rights advocacy as interconnected, with aligned goals. When forced to choose, she often prioritized human rights work. She considers signing the impeachment motion against Lukashenko and opposing the Belarus-Russia union as pivotal moments in her political career.

== Personal life ==
Hraznova is divorced and has a daughter. In her free time, she plays the piano, jogs, and tends to flowers.
