= Alexander Dabravolski =

Belarusian politician (born 1958)

- Аляксандр Дабравольскi
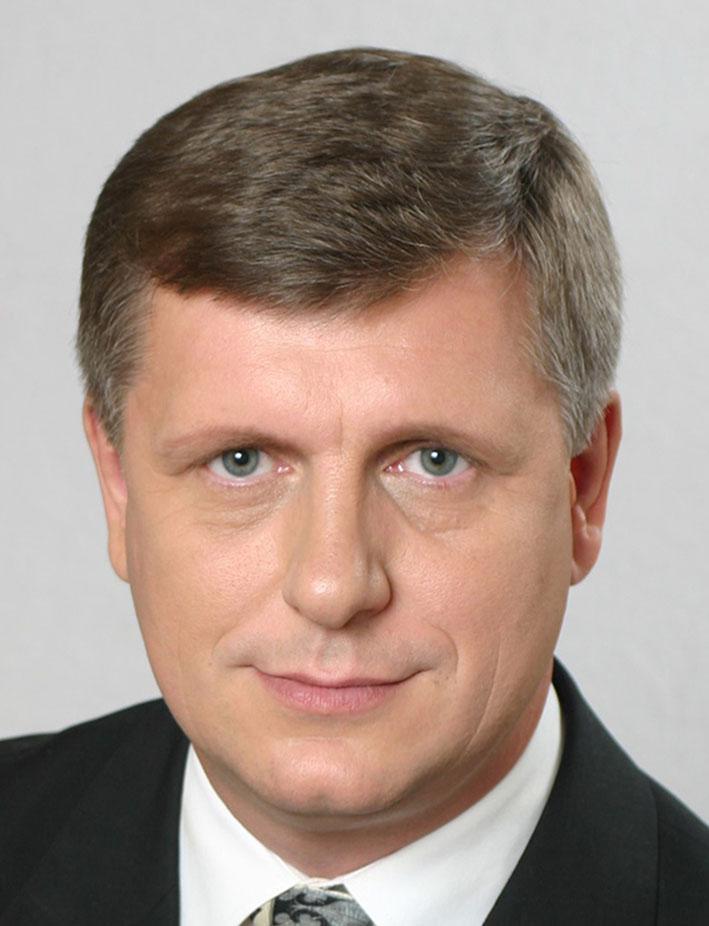
- Born: 23 November 1958 (age 67); Sula (Stowbtsy District), Byelorussian SSR, Soviet Union (now Belarus)
- Education: Belarusian State University
- Occupations: Lawyer, politician, radio physicist
- Known for: Activist, dissident
- Title: Director of East European School of Political Studies
- Term: 2008 - Present
- Political party: United Civil Party of Belarus (1995-2006)

Alexander Alhertavich Dabravolski (Belarusian: Алякс́андр Альѓертавіч Дабрав́ольскi; born 23 November 1958) is a Belarusian politician, lawyer, and radio physicist.

He helped found the United Democratic Party of Belarus (UDPB) and became involved in the opposition, serving as the vice-chairman of United Civil Party (UCP) from 1995 to 2006. Since 2008, he has been the director of the East European School of Political Studies. He was also a member of the Political Council of the United Civil Party.

== Education and family ==
Dabravolski was born in Sula, Stowbtsy District, Minsk Region, Byelorussian SSR, and attended Belarusian State University. In 1982, he graduated from the Radio Physical Department, and in 1995 he graduated from the department of law.

His wife is a teacher and his son and daughter are both students.

== Career ==
He worked as an engineer-designer and a scientific fellow from 1982 to 1989 before he was elected as an MP of the Supreme Soviet of the USSR to represent the Minsk territorial district in 1989. He spent time working in the Committee on Industry before serving as vice-chairman in the Committee on Human Rights and Freedoms.

In the First Congress of People's Deputies of the USSR, he became a member of the Inter-regional Deputy Group – the first democratic parliamentary opposition in the USSR where he worked with Andrei Sakharov, Boris Yeltsin, Anatoly Sobchak, and Vasil Bykov. A delegate to the 1989 Congress of People's Deputies of the USSR from the Lenin Komsomol. His staff was headed by KGB Lieutenant Colonel Vladimir Usoltsev, a former colleague of Vladimir Putin's in Dresden, as described in detail in his book "Sosluzhvets. Dobrolsky confirmed in an interview that a former colleague of Putin's was his chief of staff. He was one of the founders of the United Democratic Party of Belarus (UDPB), established in 1990. The UDPB was the first opposition political party registered in Belarus.

From 1991 to 1995, he was the chairman of the UDPB. In 1995, the UDPB merged with the Civil Party, forming the United Civil Party (UCP). He was soon elected as vice-chairman of the UCP. He served as the deputy director of the Independent Institute of Socio-Economic and Political Studies during this time from 1992 to 1995.

In the same year the elections to the Supreme Council of Belarus were held, the UCP created a parliamentary faction called "Civil action". Alexander Dabravolski was elected as an MP of the Supreme Council and headed the Subcommittee on Mass Media. In 1996 he was a representative of an MP group in the Constitutional Court for the impeachment of President Alexander Lukashenko.

In November 1996, Alexander Dobrovolsky, Anatoly Lebedko, and Liudmila Gryaznova supported the Communists' initiative to put the issue "On deepening integration with the Russian Federation" on the parliamentary agenda. The draft resolution on this issue proposed that by the end of 1996 Belarus and Russia unite into a single confederative state, and in the spring of 1997 this decision was to be "approved by the nation at large". The initiative disappeared after the dissolution of the Supreme Soviet.

In 2001, during the presidential election, he was the deputy chairman of Headquarters of the United Opposition Single Candidate for President Vladimir Goncharik. During the 2006 election, he was again deputy chairman of Headquarters of United Opposition Single Candidate for President Alexander Milinkevich.

From 2007 to 2008, he was a member of the Presidium of Political Council of the United Democratic Forces of Belarus. In 2007, he was elected chairman of the board. He has been the director of East European School of Political Studies (Project of Council of Europe) since 2008. Dobrovolsky has been the head of all the election headquarters of Lukashenko's rivals in the elections since 1994. Does not have a single win for the candidate teams.

During the 2020 Belarusian protests Dabravolski became a member of the Coordination Council of Sviatlana Tsikhanouskaya. Currently, he is Advisor to Sviatlana Tsikhanouskaya and Head of the Internal Policy Department of the Office of Svitalana Tsikhanouskaya.

In March 2024, it became known that Dabravolski and three other persons had been sentenced to four years of prison in absentia each, allegedly for trying to disrupt the 2022 referendum. Later that year, Dabravolski, who was accused of being the head of the "extremist group" in the case of the "analysts of Tsikhanouskaya", was sentenced in absentia to further 11 and a half years of imprisonment and a fine.

== Publications ==
- Criteria of Effectiveness of Economic Legislation Minsk: Open Society, 1998, #2 (6).
- Elections: Pure, Free and Fair. Minsk, 1999. (Co-author).
- "Legal Barriers against Entrepreneurship Development" Minsk: Bulletin of the Economists’ Club, 2000, #4.
- Elections: Legal Basis, Electoral Technologies. Minsk, 2000. (Co-Author).
- Political Parties: Belarus and Modern World. Minsk, 2002. (Co-Author). Second edition: Minsk, 2005.
- Strategy of Electoral Campaign. Minsk, 2004.
- Articles in Belarusian and foreign press.
