= Chairman of the All-Belarusian People's Assembly =

Chief executive of the All-Belarusian People's Assembly

- Старшыня Усебеларускага народнага сходу (Belarusian); Председатель Всебелорусского народного собрания (Russian)
- National emblem of Belarus

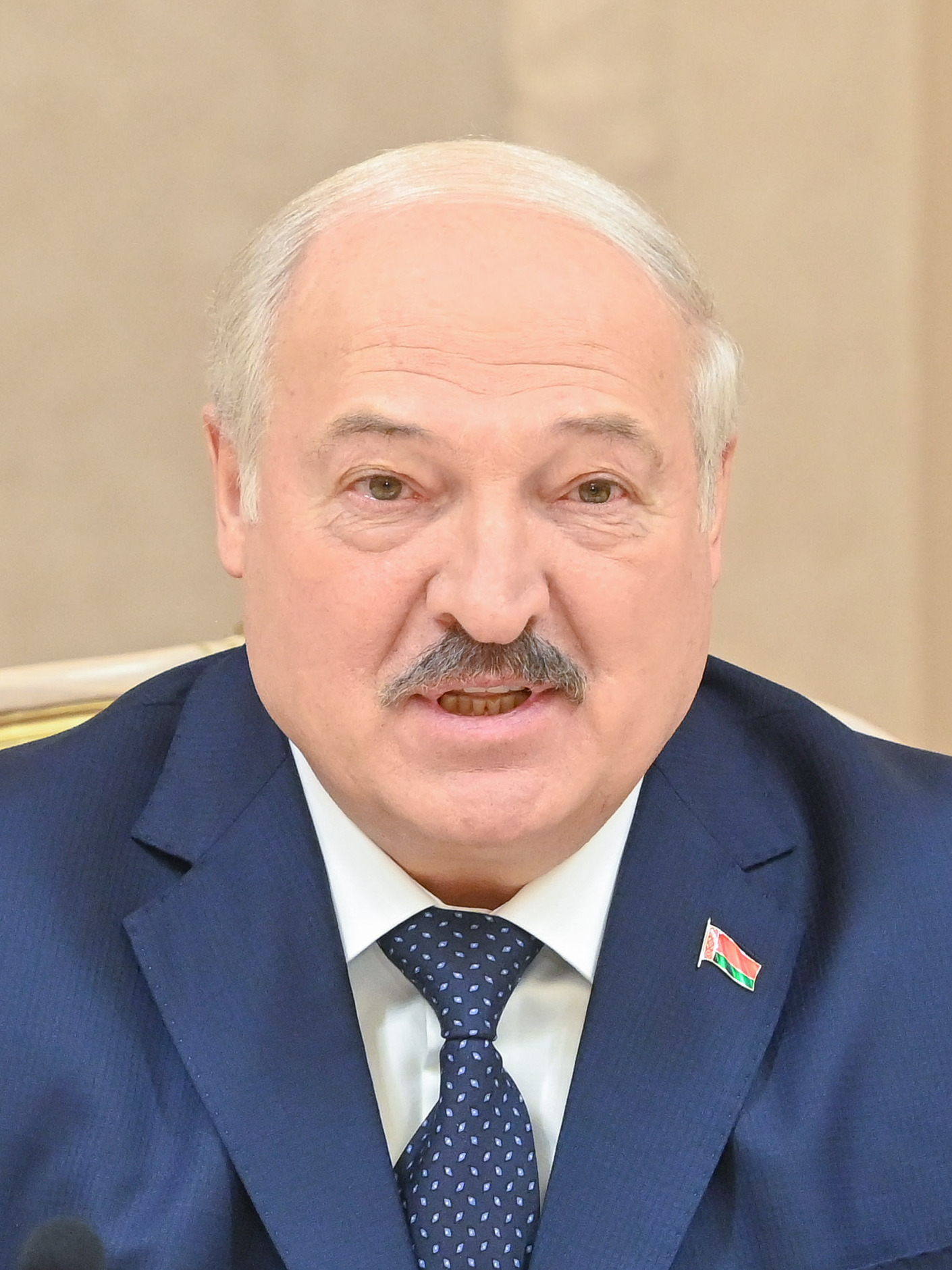
- Incumbent; Alexander Lukashenko since 24 April 2024
- All-Belarusian People's Assembly
- Member of: Presidium
- Residence: Palace of the Republic
- Seat: Minsk
- Nominator: Presidium
- Appointer: Presidium
- Term length: Five years, renewable
- Constituting instrument: Draft Law on the All-Belarusian People's Assembly
- Inaugural holder: Alexander Lukashenko
- Formation: 24 April 2024; 2 years ago

The Chairman of the All-Belarusian People's Assembly (Belarusian: Старшыня Усебеларускага народнага сходу, romanized: Staršynia Usiebielaruskaha narodnaha schodu; Russian: Председатель Всебелорусского народного собрания, romanized: Predsedatel Vsebelorusskogo narodnogo sobraniya) is the chief executive of the All-Belarusian People's Assembly. Among the most powerful positions in Belarus since its 2024 establishment, the chairman is entrusted with overseeing the activities of the ABPA and its Presidium. The current Chairman of the All-Belarusian People's Assembly is Alexander Lukashenko, who has held the position since its establishment on 24 April 2024.

== History ==
The All-Belarusian People's Assembly was established in 1996. As a result of a 2022 constitutional referendum, the results of which were neither regarded as free nor fair, the ABPA was established as the "highest representative organ of the people's government of the Republic of Belarus", with the appointment of members scheduled for 2024. The newly constituted ABPA held its first meeting, the ABPA's seventh in total, on 24 April 2024, at which Lukashenko was appointed Chairman of the ABPA.

Lukashenko's appointment was widely rejected and ridiculed in independent media, with journalist Juryj Drakachurst referring to it as a "second coronation".

== Selection and authority ==
In line with a presidential decree adopted by Lukashenko, the Chairman of the ABPA is one of the leading state positions, alongside the offices of President, Prime Minister, the heads of the Supreme and Constitutional courts, and the head of the Security Council, among other positions. The position is elected by a secret ballot of all delegates to the ABPA.

The Chairman of the ABPA has the authority to remove the president for violations of the Constitution of Belarus, as well as to override any legal acts by the Belarusian government which are viewed by the Chairman as contradicting Belarusian national security. The sole exception to this is legal judgements handed down by courts. Belsat TV argued that while the chairman's position is constitutionally not as strong as that of the presidency, it is de facto the strongest position in the country, particularly in a hypothetical instance where the presidency is held by someone besides Lukashenko.
