= Vadim Bogush =

Belarusian politician (born 1975)

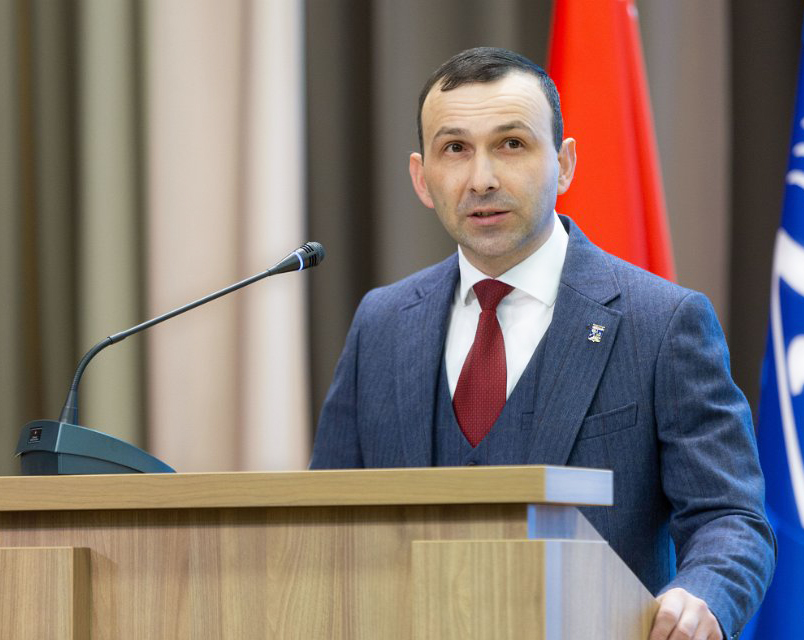
- Bogush in 2019

Rector of the Belarusian State University of Informatics and Radioelectronics
- Incumbent
- Assumed office 24 May 2018
- Appointed by: Alexander Lukashenko
- Preceded by: Mikhail Batura

Personal details
- Born: 28 April 1975 (age 50)

Vadim Anatolyevich Bogush (Russian: Вадим Анатольевич Богуш; born 28 April 1975) is a Belarusian academic and politician serving as rector of the Belarusian State University of Informatics and Radioelectronics since 2018. He has been a member of the All-Belarusian People's Assembly and its presidium since 2024. Since 2019, he has served as president of the Republican Council of Rectors of Higher Education Institutes. From 2008 to 2010, he served as prorector of the Academy of Public Administration. From 2010 to 2014, he served as deputy chairman of the National Statistical Committee. From 2014 to 2018, he served as first deputy minister of education.
