= Kosht.com =

Belarusian internet portal

KOSHT.com is a Belarusian Internet portal, which opened on 25 September 1999, and is a popular search engine in Bynet prices. It consists of catalogs of prices, boards and classified ads, job vacancies and resumes, companies’ catalogs, forums and a news site. Kosht.com specializes in IT-topics and the problems of small and medium-sized businesses.

== History ==
The creators of Kosht.com are two graduates of the BSUIR (Belarusian State University of Informatics and Radioelectronics) Department of Design and Technology – Dmitry Kachanovsky and Ilya Troshchenkov. The basic idea was that Bynet lacked a site at which buyers could get acquainted with regularly updated consolidated lists of products and prices from various dealers.

In the summer of 1999 Kachanovsky and Troshchenkov worked together in the JSC "Sota", which specialized in selling computers and accessories. Ilya was head of the retail department and also knew Accounting and Law. Dmitri worked as an engineer for PC maintenance and operation.

As a basic service they offered an opportunity for dealers to place their price lists and daily updated information. Thus, every day visitors could see what was offered, in what quantities and at what prices.

The initial cost of the launch of the project amounted to about $5,000. This amount includes the cost of used servers, a pair of used computers, printer, the cost of Internet access and rental premises.

The domain name kosht.com was purchased on August 16, 1999 and the first version of the site was launched on September 25. In the first months KOSHT.com was presented as a few spreadsheets typed in Microsoft Excel – price lists consisting of 276 entries from the two companies.

A new section – "Job Vacancies and Resumes" was added to job.kosht.com in May 2000. The "Private Bulletin board" section (bu.kosht.com) and forums were created in March 2002.

The site was re-designed in 2006 after which it acquired a more modern look.

A new information service – news.kosht.com featuring news, tests, analyst interviews and expert commentary – was added to the portal in March 2007.

In May 2009 they opened companies catalog firms.kosht.com – guide to the Belarusian IT-business. A payment system of private announcements – bu.kosht.com using SMS-messages was created on August 25 of 2009.

A new version of the portal for mobile devices was launched on the tenth anniversary of the establishment of the portal on September 25 of 2009.

== Symbolism ==
Corporate Portal logo is a green rabbit, created by the Minsk painter Vyacheslav Korzun.

== Sections ==
As of November 2009 the following sections are currently on the Kosht.com portal:

- Price list – "The Price of the Day" for computers, accessories, home appliances and mobile phones
- News
- Classifieds – "Used on KOSHT"
- Job Vacancies and resumes
- Forums
- Catalogs of various Companies

== Statistics ==
As of November 2009 according to the statistician Akavita:

- Average attendance KOSHT.com – 9,461 visitors per day, 79% of which are from Belarus.
- Monthly visitors viewed more than 1,790,000 pages.

The general average daily rating takes about 25th to 27th place in Belarus. According to Google Analytics the number of visitors ranged from 9,070 to 19,180 and the number of page views from 36,000 to 72,000 per day.

The portal publishes the following information:

- "Catalog Price" includes about 236,000 entries from 200 companies.
- In the News section – more than 600 articles and reviews are published monthly.
- In the Private Advertisements section more than 1 000 ads published per day.
- Approximately 4,000 ads per month are located in "Job Vacancies and Resumes".
- In “Companies’ Catalog” more than 1,000 Belarusian companies and organizations working in the electronics market are represented.

== Social activities ==
KOSHT.com is a permanent information partner for various Belarusian IT events and exhibitions, such as TIBO, PTS and others. In November 2006, a competition “Computers of the future will look like this!” was held together with the children's state newspaper "Zor’ka", which was attended by pupils of various orphanages.

A social project "School fair", which collected useful information and assisted parents in choosing technology for students was launched in the beginning of the 2008 school year.

== Awards ==
Belarusian Internet Forum 2004: Award in the category "Project of the Year".
