= Mikhail Batura =

Belarusian scientist

Mikhail P. Batura

3rd Rector Belarusian State University of Informatics and Radioelectronics
- In office June 2000 – Present

Personal details
- Born: May 16, 1950 (age 76)
- Education: Belarusian State University of Informatics and Radioelectronics
- Profession: Professor

Mikhail Batura (Belarusian: Міхаіл Паўлавіч Батура, born 16 May 1950) is a Belarusian scientist and university rector accused of political repressions.

He is a Doctor of Technical Sciences; Professor; Rector of the Belarusian State University of Informatics and Radioelectronics; member of the International Higher Education Academy of Sciences. His areas of scientific interest include system analysis, information processing and control in technical and organizational systems. Mikhail Batura has authored more than 150 scientific works and publications.

As part of the international sanctions against the regime in Belarus following a crackdown of the opposition following the 2010 Belarusian presidential election, Mikhail Batura became subject to travel ban and asset freeze by the European Union as part of a list of Belarusian officials responsible for political repressions, vote rigging and propaganda.

In its decision, the EU Council accused Batura of being responsible "for the expulsion of students involved in protests following the December 2010 elections."
