= Maryna Liančewskaja =

Belarusian lawyer and politician (born 1971)

- Марына Лянчэўская
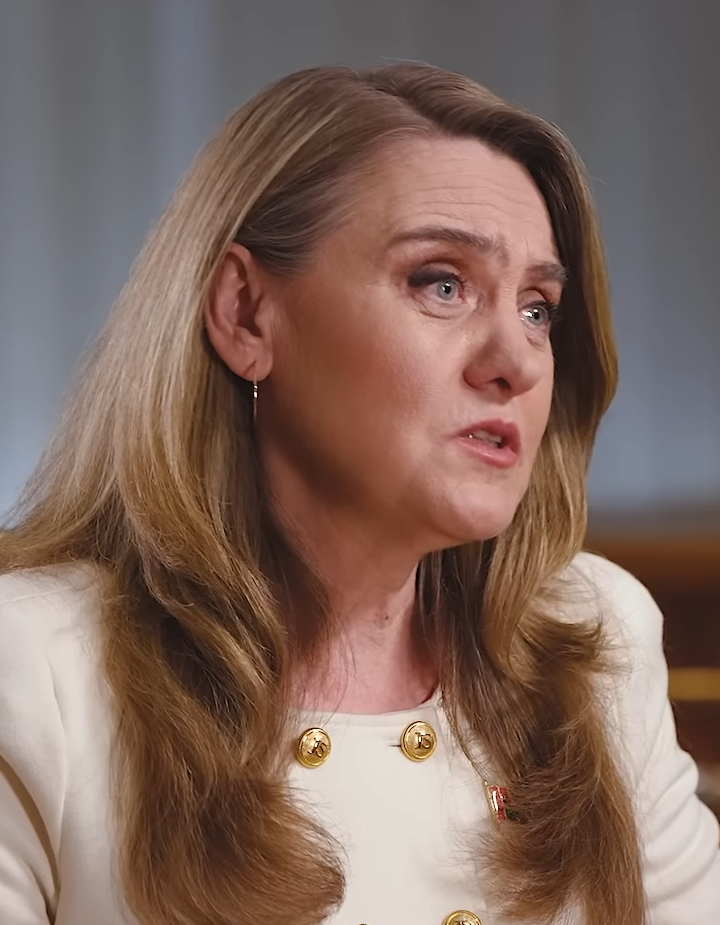
- Maryna Liančewskaja in April 2024

Member of the Presidium of the All-Belarusian People's Assembly
- Incumbent
- Assumed office 24 April 2024
- President: Alexander Lukashenko

Personal details
- Born: Maryna Alexandrovna Liančewskaja; 12 March 1971 (age 55) Evdokimovichi, Shklov district, Byelorussian Soviet Socialist Republic
- Education: Mogilev State A. Kuleshov University

Maryna Alexandrovna Liančewskaja (Belarusian: Марына Аляксандраўна Лянчэўская; born 12 March 1971) is a Belarusian lawyer and politician, member of the Presidium of the All-Belarusian People's Assembly since 2024 representing the National Assembly of the Republic of Belarus. She is member of the House of Representatives since 2019.

== Early life ==
Liančewskaja was born on 12 March 1971 in Evdokimovichi, Shklov district, Byelorussian Soviet Socialist Republic. She graduated from the Mogilev State A. Kuleshov University, the Belarusian Institute of Law and the Academy of Public Administration.

She began her career as a judicial secretary at the Mogilev Regional Court. In 2001 she was appointed head of the department for monitoring compliance with the law in criminal cases at the Mogilev Regional Prosecutor's Office. She also worked at the Prosecutor General's Office of the Republic of Belarus.

== Political career ==
In the 2019 parliamentary election Liančewskaja was elected member of the House of Representatives representing Zapadny number 101 District. She became the first woman to serve on the National Security Committee and during her term she drafted 13 bills on military, defence and criminal matters and is currently heading the Committee on Law. She is also member of the Belarusian Delegation to the Parliamentary Assembly of the Organization for Security and Co-operation in Europe.

As a deputy, she proposed introducing the death penalty for those accused of attempted terrorist acts.

Liančewskaja criticised the 2020–2021 Belarusian protests and supported Russia's international recognition of the Donetsk People's Republic and the Luhansk People's Republic in 2022. She co-authored the 2022 Amnesty Law, stating that it would not apply to political prisoners detained during democratic protests as that wouldn't be "fair".

She was re-elected in the 2024 parliamentary election.

On 24 April 2024, Liančewskaja was appointed to the Presidium of the All-Belarusian People's Assembly, the leadership of Belarus' highest organ of state power, representing the legislative power.

== Personal life ==
She is married with whom have two sons.
