= Aleksandr Kosinets =

Belarusian politician (born 1959)

- Александр Косинец; Аляксандр Косінец
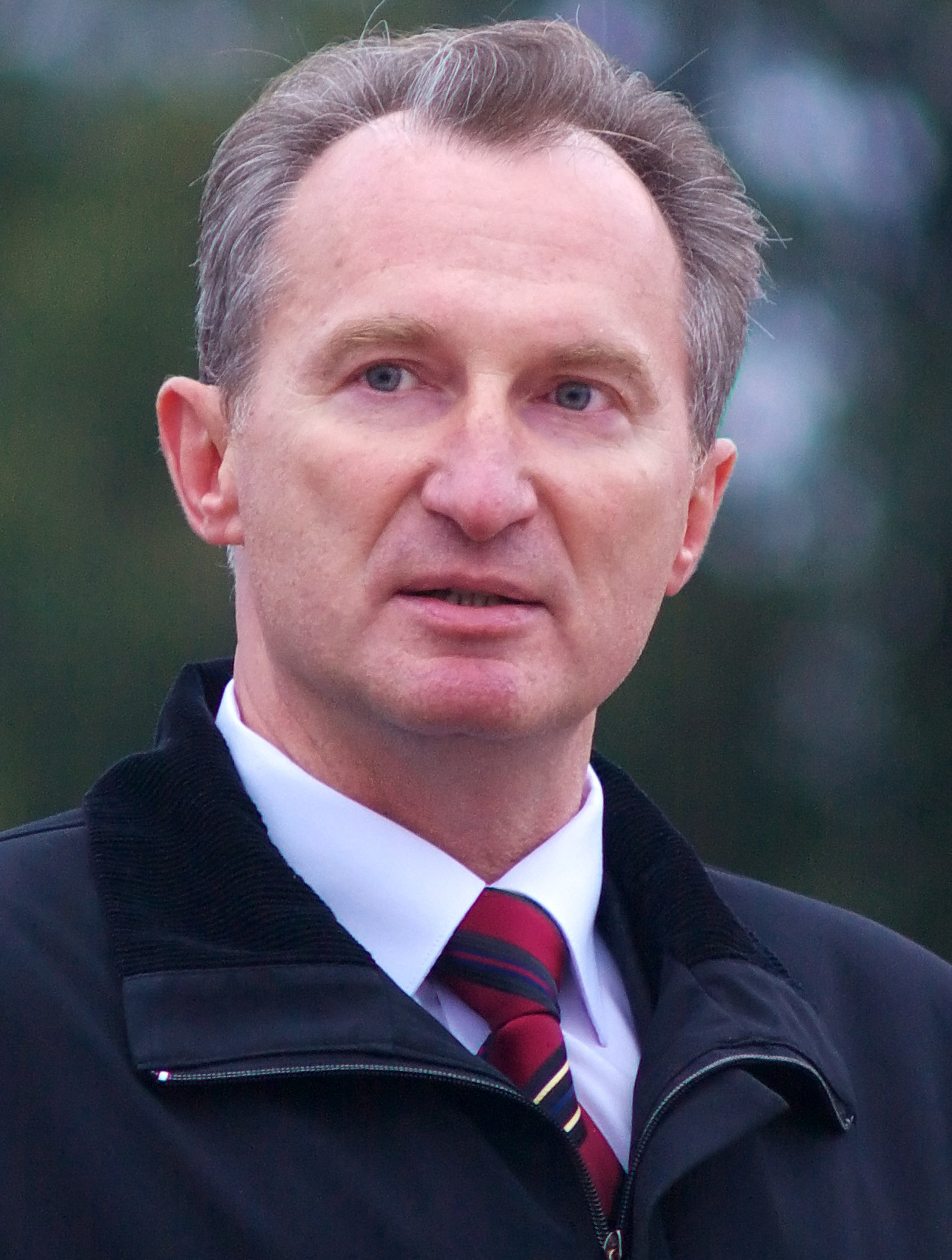
- Kosinets in 2009

1st Deputy Chairman of the All-Belarusian People's Assembly
- Incumbent
- Assumed office 24 April 2024
- Chairman: Alexander Lukashenko
- Preceded by: Office established

Chief of Staff to the President
- In office 27 December 2014 – 5 December 2016
- President: Alexander Lukashenko
- Preceded by: Andrei Kobyakov
- Succeeded by: Natalya Kochanova

Governor of the Vitebsk Region
- In office 24 November 2008 – 27 December 2014
- President: Alexander Lukashenko
- Preceded by: Vladimir Andreichenko
- Succeeded by: Nikolai Sherstnev

Personal details
- Born: 27 May 1959 (age 67)

Aleksandr Nikolayevich Kosinets (Note: Alyaksandr Mikalayevich Kosinets in Belarusian; Russian: Александр Николаевич Косинец, Belarusian: Аляксандр Мікалаевіч Косінец) (born 27 May 1959) is a Belarusian politician serving as deputy chairman of the All-Belarusian People's Assembly since 2024. From 2014 to 2016, he served as Chief of Staff to the President. From 2008 to 2014, he served as governor of the Vitebsk Region.
