= Pyotr Miklashevich =

Belarusian politician

Piotr Petrovich Miklashevich
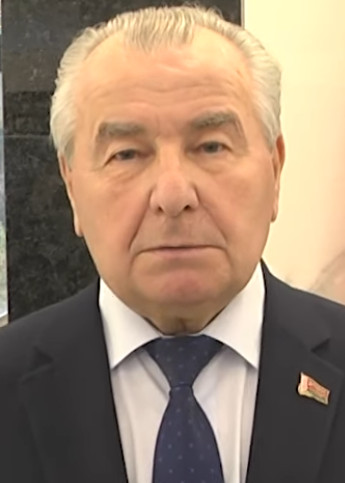
- Piotr Miklashevich in 2024

Chairman of the Constitutional Court of Belarus
- Incumbent
- Assumed office 8 February 2008
- President: Alexander Lukashenko
- Preceded by: Grigory Vasilevich

Prosecutor General of Belarus
- In office 29 November 2004 – 8 February 2008
- President: Alexander Lukashenko
- Preceded by: Viktor Sheiman
- Succeeded by: Grigory Vasilevich

Personal details
- Born: 18 October 1954 (age 71) Kasuta, Vileyka district, Minsk Oblast, Byelorussian SSR, Soviet Union
- Education: Belarusian State University

Piotr Petrovich Miklashevich (born 18 October 1954) is a Belarusian politician, currently serving as Chairman of the Constitutional Court of Belarus.

== Early life and education ==
Piotr Miklashevich was born on October 18, 1954, in the village of Kasuta, Minsk Oblast.

He served in the military from 1972 to 1982. In 1981, graduated from the Law Faculty of Belarusian State University.

== Career ==
From 1982, Miklashevich served as a judge in the Buda-Kashalyova district and as a judge in the Gomel Regional Court, which he chaired from 1989 to 1998.

In 1998–1999 he worked as First Deputy Minister of Justice of Belarus. From 2001 to 2004, he served as the First Deputy Chairman of the Supreme Court of Belarus.

Between 2004 and 2008, he served as Prosecutor General of Belarus. On 8 February 2008, he was appointed Chairman of the Constitutional Court of Belarus.

Miklashevich was Chair of the Commission behind the 2022 constitutional referendum.

== Sanctions ==
Miklashevich is sanctioned by the United States (Specially Designated Nationals and Blocked Persons List), the Baltic states, the European Union, the United Kingdom, Canada, Switzerland, Albania, Iceland, Lichtenstein, Montenegro, North Macedonia, and Norway.
