= Dmitry Demidov =

Belarusian politician (born 1975)

Member of the Council of the Republic
- In office 6 December 2019 – 12 April 2024
- Constituency: Vitebsk region

Personal details
- Born: 11 December 1975 (age 50)
- Party: Belaya Rus

Dmitry Vladimirovich Demidov (Russian: Дмитрий Владимирович Демидов; born 11 December 1975) is a Belarusian politician serving as chairman of the Vitebsk Regional Council of Deputies since 2024. From 2015 to 2024, he served as mayor of Novopolotsk. From 2019 to 2024, he was a member of the Council of the Republic.
