= Ilhom Nematov =

Uzbek diplomat

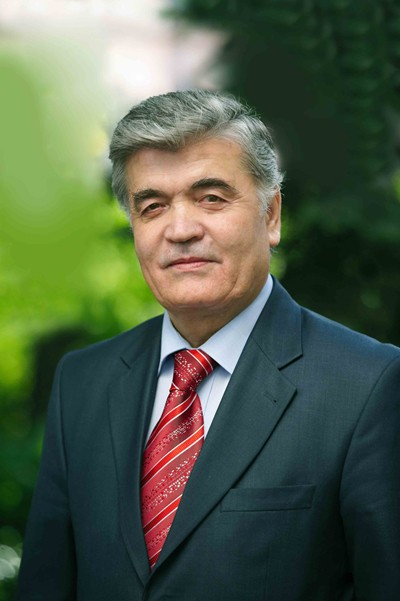
- Nematov in 2009

Deputy chairman of the Commonwealth of Independent States executive committee
- Incumbent
- Assumed office 2021

Ambassador Extraordinary and Plenipotentiary of the Republic of Uzbekistan to Brazil, Canada, and the United States
- In office 2010–2013

Ambassador Extraordinary and Plenipotentiary of Uzbekistan to Russia
- In office 2008–2010

Ambassador Extraordinary and Plenipotentiary of Uzbekistan to India
- In office 1997–1999
- President: Islam Karimov

Personal details
- Born: May 1, 1947 (age 79) Namangan, Uzbek SSR, USSR
- Education: Diplomatic Academy of the Ministry of Foreign Affairs of the Russian Federation

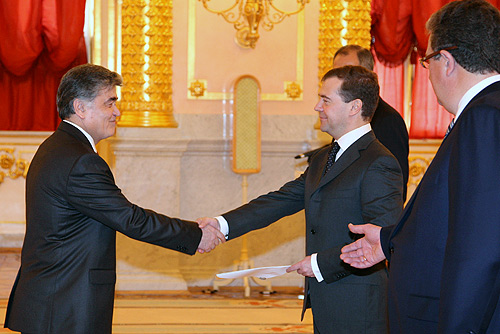
Nematov presenting his credentials to Dmitry Medvedev in February 2009.

Ilhom Tuychievich Nematov (Russian: Ильхом Туйчиевич Неъматов, Uzbek: Ilhom Tuychievich Nematov) (born 1 May 1952) is an Uzbek diplomat and served as ambassador to many countries, including India, Russia, the United States, Brazil, and Canada. He presented his credentials to US President Barack H. Obama on 27 February 2009.
