= Chief of Staff to the President of Belarus =

Head of the Presidential Administration of Belarus Кіраўнік Адміністрацыі Прэзідэнта Рэспублікі Беларусь Главы Администрации президента Республики Беларусь
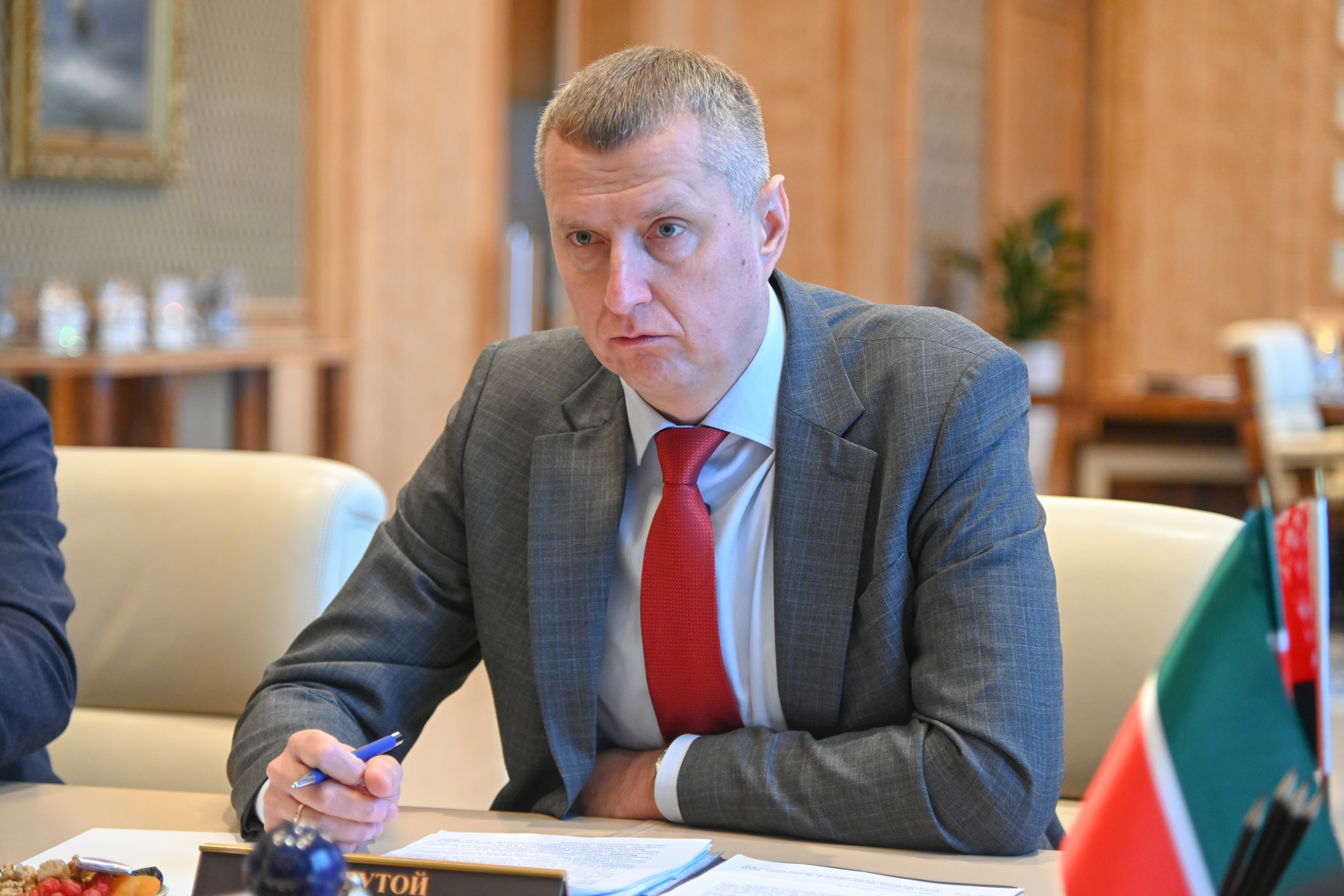
- Incumbent; Dmitry Krutoi since 27 June 2024
- Presidential Administration of Belarus
- Appointer: President of Belarus
- Inaugural holder: Leanid Sinitsyn
- Formation: 22 July 1994

The Chief of Staff to the President of Belarus also known as the Head of the Presidential Administration (Belarusian: Кіраўнік Адміністрацыі Прэзідэнта Рэспублікі Беларусь, romanized: Kirawnik Administratsyi Prezidenta, Russian: Глава Администрации президента Республики Беларусь) is the head of the Presidential Administration of Belarus. The position was created by President Lukashenko in July 1994. The Chief of Staff is responsible for general management of presidential activity. The incumbent Chief of Staff is Dmitry Krutoi, who assumed the position in June 2024.

The following responsibilities are entrusted to the chief of staff:

- Providing management of the departments heads;
- Allocate responsibilities to Deputy Chief of Staff;
- Coordinate the activities of Presidential aids and advisors;
- Enact the proposal of draft laws, decrees and orders;
- Presents candidates for official positions;

== Office holders ==
#	Portrait	Chief	Term of office	President
1		Leanid Sinitsyn	22 July 1994 — 10 October 1995	Alexander Lukashenko
2		Mikhail Myasnikovich	10 October 1995 — 12 September 2001	Alexander Lukashenko
3		Ural Latypov	12 September 2001 — 29 November 2004	Alexander Lukashenko
4		Viktar Sheyman	29 November 2004 — 5 January 2006	Alexander Lukashenko
5		Hienadź Niewyhłas	5 January 2006 — 8 July 2008	Alexander Lukashenko
6		Uladzimir Makey	8 July 2008 — 20 August 2012	Alexander Lukashenko
7		Andrei Kobyakov	27 August 2012 — 27 December 2014	Alexander Lukashenko
8		Alyaksandr Kosinets	27 December 2014 — 5 December 2016	Alexander Lukashenko
9		Natallya Kachanava	21 December 2016 — 5 December 2019	Alexander Lukashenko
10		Ihar Serheenka	5 December 2019 — 29 March 2024	Alexander Lukashenko
11		Dmitry Krutoi	27 June 2024 — present	Alexander Lukashenko

== First Deputy Heads ==
- Mikhail Sazonaw (15 July 1995 — 5 March 1997)
- Uladzimir Rusakevich (15 July 1997 — 19 June 2000)
- Vladimir Zametalin (19 June 2000 — 12 September 2001)
- Stanislav Knyazev (12 September 2001 — 25 March 2003)
- Alyaksandr Papkow (18 August 2003 — 4 January 2006)
- Anatoli Rubinov (4 January 2006 — 30 October 2008)
- Natallya Pyatkyevich (9 January 2009 — 28 December 2010)
- Alexander Radkov/Konstantin Martynetsky (28 December 2010 — 5 December 2016)
- Maxim Ryzhenkov (21 December 2016 — 27 June 2024)
- Natallya Pyatkyevich (27 June 2024 — present)
