= Anatoly Isachenko =

Belarusian politician (born 1966)

- Анатоль Ісачaнка (Belarusian); Анатолий Исаченко (Russian)
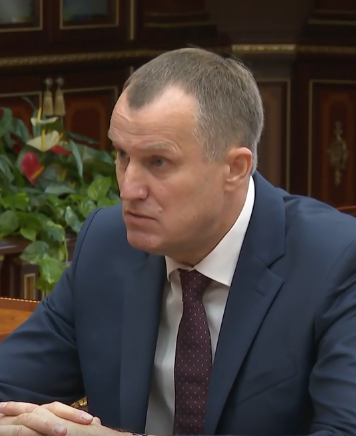
- Isachenko in 2019

Governor of Mogilev Region
- Incumbent
- Assumed office 13 December 2021
- President: Alexander Lukashenko
- Preceded by: Leonid Zayats

Governor of Minsk Region
- In office 4 July 2017 – 3 December 2019
- President: Alexander Lukashenko
- Preceded by: Semyon Shapiro
- Succeeded by: Alexander Turchin

Personal details
- Born: 15 March 1966 (age 60) Kuznets, Bryansk Oblast, Russian SFSR, Soviet Union

Anatoly Mikhailovich Isachenko (Russian: Анатолий Михайлович Исаченко; Belarusian: Анатоль Міхайлавіч Ісачанка, romanized: Anatol Michajłavič Isačanka; born 15 March 1966) is a Belarusian politician serving as governor of the Mogilev Region since 2021. From 2019 to 2021, he served as deputy speaker of the Council of the Republic. From 2017 to 2019, he served as governor of the Minsk Region.
