= Iryna Tyliec =

Belarusian judge

Iryna Vladimirovna Tyliec (Belarusian: Ирина Владимировна Тылец) is a Belarusian judge, one of the vicepresident of the Supreme Court of Belarus since 2026. She is also member of the Presidium of the All-Belarusian People's Assembly since 2024 representing the judiciary.

== Career ==
Tyliec graduated in law from the Belarusian State University in 1992 and began her legal career as a judicial secretary at the Oktyabrsky District Court in Minsk, until in 1993 she was appointed a judge of that court and in 1996 its vice-chairwoman.

In 2004 Tyliec was appointed a judge of the Supreme Court of Belarus and on 27 September 2018 she was also appointed Secretary of the plenum of the Supreme Court. Since 2023 she has been the President of the Republican Council of Judges.

The Supreme Court nominated her unanimously to the Presidium of the All-Belarusian People's Assembly on 23 April 2024, which is the leadership of Belarus' highest organ of state power. She was appointed the following day to represent the judiciary.

On 10 February 2026 the Presidium named her one of the vicepresidents of the Supreme Court.
