= 2022 Belarusian constitutional referendum =

Sham constitutional referendum in Belarus

- 27 February 2022
- "Do you accept the amendments and additions to the Constitution of the Republic of Belarus?"

Results
Choice	Votes	%
Yes	4,440,830	86.64%
No	684,946	13.36%
Valid votes	5,125,776	95.64%
Invalid or blank votes	233,627	4.36%
Total votes	5,359,403	100.00%
Registered voters/turnout	6,815,667	78.63%

A constitutional referendum was held in Belarus on 27 February 2022. The referendum was ordered by President Alexander Lukashenko in January 2022. Proposed changes to the Constitution included allowing Lukashenko to remain in office until 2035 and empowering the All-Belarusian People's Assembly, an extra-parliamentary body composed mostly of state officials. The changes also renounced Belarus's nuclear-free zone status, allowing Belarus to host nuclear weapons; the lead-up to the referendum occurred as Russia amassed its troops in both Russia and Belarus in the prelude to the Russian invasion of Ukraine, and the election itself was held several days after Russia began its military offensive into Ukraine.

According to the Central Election Commission of Belarus (CEC), 65.2% of voters voted in favor of the amendments to the State Constitution.

The referendum was carried out in an atmosphere of repression; the Belarusian opposition was not permitted to campaign, and the voting process was considered neither free nor fair. The referendum was denounced as a sham by the Belarusian opposition and its exiled leader Sviatlana Tsikhanouskaya, by the European Union, and the United States.

== Background ==
In 2016, Lukashenko publicly spoke about possible amendments to the Constitution at some point in the future. On June 26, 2020, the preparation was officially announced. Two drafts of the altered Constitution were shown to Lukashenko, which were both rejected.

On March 28, 2020, a special meeting of the OSCE on the issue of the situation in Belarus was held in Vienna. Belarusian state representatives addressed that meeting and explained that constitutional reform is the only way to hold early presidential elections before the expiration of Lukashenko's sixth presidential term. He also assured that the amendments to the Constitution will facilitate the liberalization of the Belarusian political system by enhancing roles of political parties and making alterations in its Electoral Code.

On March 15, 2021, Lukashenko signed a decree establishing a Constitutional Commission. The Commission was to develop proposals of necessary amendments to the Constitution and ensure its nationwide referendum. Head of the Constitutional Court of Belarus Pyotr Miklashevich was appointed Chair of the Commission, Vladimir Andreichenko and Natalya Kochanova were appointed Vice-Chairs. The Commission included prominent sportsmen, scientists, social activists and top managers. The Commission offered every citizen to submit proposals via email and post.

A few days earlier, on March 10, 2021, the opposition published its version of the new Constitution that should have changed the state system to parliamentary instead of presidential. The opposition also offered to switch to White-red-white flag and Pahonia coat of arms, to abolish the death penalty, strengthen the Belarusian language and reform the state education system.

Former Minister of Education Ihar Karpienka was appointed head of the Central Election Commission of Belarus, while longtime Chair of Election Commission Lidia Yermoshina was dismissed. In the aftermath of the 2020 Belarusian presidential election educators, who generally work in local electoral commissions, were widely criticized for assistance in fraud. According to journalist Sergey Pulsha, one of Karpienka's main tasks was to draw more teachers to local committees to ensure specific results of the referendum, desired by the authorities.

In January 2021, President Lukashenko announced that a new draft constitution would be prepared by the end of 2021. On 27 December 2021, the proposed changes were published. On January 20, 2022, Lukashenko signed a decree on setting the date of the referendum for February 27, 2022. According to Belarusian law, the new Constitution enters into force 10 days after being officially published.

The Belarusian National Centre of Legal Information received 8,919 letters from Belarusian citizens with proposals on amendments to the Constitution. According to the Centre, more than 99% approved the changes, offered by the government. Only 13 letters supported the old version of the Constitution, 27 criticized the amendments. There is a recorded case of legal prosecution of Nikolay Vitikov, a 68 years old Belarusian retiree, who sent his letter with proposals to a local newspaper. On January 4, 2022, law enforcement officers raided his house and detained him. He was charged under a ‘hate-sowing’ article of the Criminal Code, facing from 3 to 5 years in prison. Later the newspaper published an article claiming that it had reported the man because they found his letter offensive to the authorities, containing "fascist slogans" and "Judas kisses". The editors' office made derogatory comments about the man's opinions and intellectual capacity. Overall, nine criminal cases were opened in the run-up to the referendum.

The first CEC session took place on January 21, 2022. More than 7 mln bulletins were printed for the voting. For the first time in Belarusian history, all bulletins were written in Russian. About $8.6 mln were spent for the referendum. On January 27, the CEC ordered to remove curtains from polling booths and set 'youth patrols' to protect polling stations. The Commission explained its order to remove curtains as an anti-Covid measure, claiming that the secrecy of the ballot would not be violated. Karpienka claimed that curtains were removed for better ventilation. Meanwhile, an independent political analyst Artyom Shreibman thought it was an intimidation step to make voters feel controlled and surveyed.

The government launched a big promotion campaign to make people vote. They organized flash mobs, promo shows, filmed promo videos, some starring military officers. Audio advertising was played in public transport.

Shortly before the referendum day, the CEC announced that names of election commission members would be classified. According to Karpienka, there have been threats against many of those who were in commissions during the 2020 Belarusian presidential election. The step was widely criticized for violation of Belarusian Election Law, while the CEC representative denied all accusations.

A constitutional reform in Russia in 2020 was supposedly the possible source of inspiration of the Belarusian constitutional changes, along with Kazakhstan.

== Proposed changes ==
=== Drafts and corrections ===
Proposed changes to the Constitution were published on 22 July 2021.

- Extending age limit and residence qualification for presidential candidates (so a candidate must be a citizen of Belarus for at least 20 years, while individuals who have held, or hold, dual citizenship or residency permits in foreign countries would be disqualified from running for office);
- Establishing the All-Belarusian People's Assembly as highest representative body;
- Limiting legislative authority of the president by forbidding him to issue decrees with the force of law;
- Extending the Parliament's term of service to 5 years;
- Empowering Prime Minister by strengthening his role in budget and Government formation;
- Establishing an Ombudsman Office;
- Defining marriage as a "union of a man and a woman";

Lukashenko ordered to refine the draft and demanded to be consulted about every article. The proposed new edition was published on 27 December 2021, with the following changes compared to the first version.

- In case of the president's violent death all his power goes to the Security Council of Belarus;
- The former president can no longer be prosecuted and held accountable for actions committed during his term;
- A president will be able to become a lifetime member of the Council of the Republic
- Limiting presidency to two terms;
- Developing nuclear energy sector for peaceful purposes;
- Removed article on pursuing status of a neutral country and commitment not to station nuclear weapons.

The final draft was presented on 20 January 2022. It contained few differences from the previous one. One of them was the introduction of "ideology of Belarusian state", which formed the basis of Belarusian democracy and pluralism.

=== Analysis ===
Some political analysts suggested that the main change in the constitution was legitimization of the All-Belarusian People's Assembly that was created by Lukashenko's regime. According to new Constitution, the Assembly would become the highest representative body that can choose members of CEC, assign judges of the Highest Court and the Constitutional Court, impeach presidents, rule state international politics, introduce bills before Parliament, submit amendments to the Constitution, etc. Political analysts suggested that Lukashenko planned to become both the head of the All-Belarusian People's Assembly and the president simultaneously, or can join the Assembly after his presidency to have influence over his successor. Amendments returned the two-term limitation for president which had been cancelled by Lukashenko in 2004, but the limit would only start after the referendum, allowing Lukashenko to rule until 2035. Another new clause noted by political analysts is complete legal immunity for former presidents for actions carried out while in office and permanent membership of any former president in the Council of the Republic. Also Lukashenko is excluded from the new clause that prohibits holding two political positions simultaneously. According to Belarusian oppositionist Pavel Latushko, Lukashenko couldn’t call for a referendum in the first place because he is not a legitimate president.

== Referendum organization ==
=== Overview ===
Territorial election commissions administer elections in Belarus under the supervision of the CEC and their members are selected by the various local, district, and regional councils. On January 26, 2022, 1,857 of 1,935 nominated candidates were formally selected as members for 153 territorial election commissions. All nominated representatives for opposition parties and groups were rejected (20 applications from 3 parties were made, other parties refused to participate), while 99% of the nominated representatives for the five largest pro-government public associations and trade unions were selected. The most well-represented associations were pro-Lukashenko public associations — Federation of Trade Unions of Belarus, Belaya Rus, Belarusian Female Union, Belarusian Republican Youth Union. Total of 39,909 national observers had received accreditation.

Preliminary voting was scheduled for 22 to 26 February. The referendum day was scheduled for February 27, 2022. According to the CEC, 6,818,948 Belarusians had voting rights. 5,510 polling stations with 58,355 workers were opened across the country.

=== Bulletin ===
The bulletin was written in Russian and had only one question:

Принимаете ли Вы изменения и дополнения Конституции Республики Беларусь?
"Do you accept the amendments and additions to the Constitution of the Republic of Belarus?"

=== Observation ===
Four opposition parties (the United Civic Party, Green Party, Social Democratic Party (People's Assembly) and the BPF Party) declined to monitor the referendum citing political crisis and ongoing repressions as the reasons.

International observers from SCO and CIS countries were invited to monitor the referendum. Ilhom Nematov was assigned the CIS mission Head. In its turn, the EU refused to send its observers, though there was news before that more than 30 representatives would arrive to monitor the voting. Belarusian authorities didn’t invite ODIHR. Belarusian Minister of Foreign Affairs Vladimir Makei claimed that ODIHR reports ‘were written beforehand with deep prejudices and maximum political motivation’. Overall, 92 of 101 international observers of the referendum represented the CIS. Only when the voting started 22 independent observers from Austria, Germany, Spain, Lithuania, Italy, Ukraine, Serbia, Switzerland, and Estonia, were authorized to monitor the polling process.

=== Early polling ===
The early polling started on February 22, 2022, and went for 4 days. The polling stations were open from 10AM to 2PM and then from 4PM to 7PM. Reinforced security measures were announced starting with the first day. Two policemen were guarding every station and conducting videorecording. A special monitoring centre was established to process data from stations and monitor the polling.

== Criticism ==
=== Opposition response ===
Sviatlana Tsikhanouskaya, Pavel Latushko and several other opposition figures called for active boycott of the referendum by deliberate spoiling of ballots and this way turn the Referendum into a vote of no confidence. According to Pavel Latushko, Belarusians were not actually given any choice: the oppositionist explains that both new and old Constitutions seal Lukashenko's grip on power. On December 18, 2021, Tikhanovskaya urged all Belarusians to come to polling stations at 2PM on the day of Referendum and greet each other in Belarusian language. This way people could gather en masse without threats of brutal police crackdown. Later she called for peaceful antiwar protests at central squares of Belarusian cities. The opposition announced a meeting at 17:00 in front of the Ministry of Defence building in Minsk.

On the day of referendum, following the Russian invasion of Ukraine, massive anti-war protests broke out across Belarus. More than 800 people were detained. Later the police announced that even the drivers who were honking in support of protesters would be fined and stripped of driving licenses.

=== Drawbacks of amendments ===
The Belarusian opposition criticized the proposed changes. Anatoly Lebedko claimed that the constitutional reform is the imitation of changes due to disregard for the Constitution as such. He stressed that Belarus would remain a "superpresidential" republic with a formal "three-storeyed construction" (two chambers of the parliament and the All-Belarusian People's Assembly). He believed that one the main addressees of the new constitution is Russian president Vladimir Putin. Political analyst Andrey Yahorau assumed that formal changes in the configuration of politics will be crucial during the "transit of power". He also suggested that new Constitution can ease slow annexation of Belarus by Russia ("integration").

The amendments will also remove Article 18 that pledged that "the Republic of Belarus aims at making its territory a nuclear-free zone", worrying NATO that it could allow Russian nuclear weapons.

European Commission for Democracy through Law (Venice Commission) criticized the changes, saying they would exacerbate the current imbalance of powers in Belarus. The commission (which wasn't allowed to meet with Belarusian authorities) also criticized the opaque process of the development of the changes and lack of collaboration of the government, the opposition, the civil society and other interested parties.

=== Flaws of polling ===
The government organized public discussion for the constitutional changes; however, it only lasted for 3 weeks which were filled with public holidays. Belarusian political scientist Valer Karbalevich called the government-led discussion of the project a profanation.

Several political analysts underlined that the Russian invasion of Ukraine blinded the media and society and helped Lukashenko to distract the public eye from the referendum.

After the referendum an independent initiative ‘Human Rights For Free Elections’, established by the ‘Viasna’ and the BHC, published a report on violations during the polling. According to the report, many observers found names of their deceased parents on electoral lists; the administrative capacities were used during active referendum campaigning; mandatory copies of electoral commissions' reports were absent at many polling stations. Multiple cases of forced voting under threats of dismissal from employment or universities were reported. In Brest, doctors at the children city hospital were asked to visit polling stations during working hours.

An observer from the Belarusian Left Party "A Just World" Vadim Kuzmin had his accreditation annulled and was called to the General Prosecutor's office for reporting violations at his polling station.

== Results ==
The central elections commission stated that 65.2% of voters were in favor, with 10.1% reportedly voting against and a 78.6% turnout.

Choice	Votes	%
For	4,440,830	86.64
Against	684,946	13.36
Total	5,125,776	100.00
Valid votes	5,125,776	95.64
Invalid/blank votes	233,627	4.36
Total votes	5,359,403	100.00
Registered voters/turnout	6,815,667	78.63
Source: TASS, Direct Democracy

== Reactions ==
The results were considered not surprising given government control, and external verification was not possible due to a lack of independent election monitors. Exiled opposition leader Tsikhanouskaya and other opposition figures called on Belarusians to use the vote to protest the 2022 Russian invasion of Ukraine. United States, Canada and several countries in the European Union, refused to recognize the results, condemned violations at the Referendum and noted there was no space for democracy and free voting in Belarus under Lukashenko's regime and his massive crackdown on opposition.

== See also ==
- Constitution of Belarus
- Human rights in Belarus
