= Oleg Rummo =

Belarusian politician (born 1970)

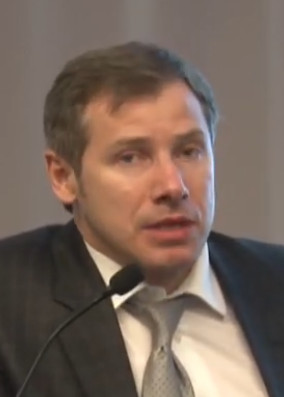
- Rummo in 2018

Member of the Council of the Republic
- Incumbent
- Assumed office 11 October 2016
- Constituency: Minsk City

Personal details
- Born: 26 July 1970 (age 55)

Oleg Olegovich Rummo (Russian: Олег Олегович Руммо; born 26 July 1970) is a Belarusian politician serving as a member of the Council of the Republic since 2016. He has been a member of the Parliamentary Assembly of the Organization for Security and Co-operation in Europe since 2016.
