= Alexander Brantsevich =

Belarusian politician (born 1979)

Member of the Presidium of the All-Belarusian People's Assembly
- Incumbent
- Assumed office 25 April 2024
- President: Alexander Lukashenko
- Constituency: Vitebsk region

Personal details
- Born: 30 October 1979 (age 46)

Alexander Vasilevich Brantsevich (Russian: Александр Васильевич Бранцевич; born 30 October 1979) is a Belarusian politician serving as a member of the Presidium of the All-Belarusian People's Assembly since 2024. He has been a member of the Vitebsk Regional Council of Deputies since 2024, and has served as director general of Vitebskoblgaz since 2022.
