= All-Belarusian People's Assembly =

Belarusian state organ under Alexander Lukashenko's regime

All-Belarusian People's Assembly Усебеларускі народны сход Всебелорусское народное собрание
- 7th All-Belarusian People's Assembly

Overview
- Type: Highest representative organ of the government.
- Length of term: Five years
- Term limits: None

History
- Established: 19 October 1996; 29 years ago
- First convocation: 19–20 October 1996

Leadership
- Chairman: Alexander Lukashenko, Chairman of the All-Belarusian People's Assembly
- Executive organ: Presidium

Members
- Total: 1,200

Elections
- First election: 1st All-Belarusian People's Assembly (1996)
- Last election: 7th All-Belarusian People's Assembly (2024)

Meeting place
- Palace of the Republic, Minsk

Website
- vns.gov.by

The All-Belarusian People's Assembly (Note: Belarusian: Усебеларускі народны сход, Usiebielaruski narodny schod, UNS; Russian: Всебелорусское народное собрание, VNS.) is the highest organ of state power in the Republic of Belarus. Established in 1996, it was granted wide-ranging powers as a result of the 2022 Belarusian constitutional referendum. It has since become the primary governing body in Belarus de jure, while in practice, the Assembly is composed of regime-selected delegates and serves to reinforce Alexander Lukashenko's authoritarian rule.

== History ==
The first Assembly was held 19–20 October 1996, a few weeks before the controversial referendum which was used to legitimize the concentration of power in the hands of president Alexander Lukashenko. The second Assembly took place in May 2001, the third in March 2006, the fourth in 2010, the fifth in 2016, and the sixth in 2021.

=== Seventh assembly ===
Following the 2022 Belarusian constitutional referendum, the All-Belarusian People's Assembly was given the position of the "highest representative organ of the people's government of the Republic of Belarus". In accordance with proposals by Lukashenko, the composition of the All-Belarusian People's Assembly was placed at 1,200 delegates elected to a five year term. As a result of the referendum, the ABPA was given sweeping powers, including to dismiss the president, dispute the results of any election, and send the Armed Forces abroad at the President's request. Following the announcement of the plans, pro-democracy activist Anatoly Lebedko described Belarus as becoming a "super-presidential republic".

As a result of further powers granted to the ABPA in 2024, Radio Free Europe/Radio Liberty described the newly-established office of chairman as the "highest state position". Lukashenko was appointed as chairman of the ABPA during the 7th All-Belarusian People's Assembly on 24 April 2024. A presidium was also selected at the same time as Lukashenko's appointment. Lukashenko was also elected as chair of the presidium.

The post-2022 ABPA presidium was described by Novy Chas and Artyom Shraibman as being a form of a politburo or a central committee. Jakob Wöllenstein of the Konrad Adenauer Foundation saw the ABPA and its presidium as providing Lukashenko with "dual power" as long as he remained president of Belarus, and as a "dormant organ" that would justify his retaining de facto power if someone else were elected president.

== Delegates ==
The All-Belarusian People's Assembly comprises 1,200 delegates. This includes the President of Belarus, any former Presidents of Belarus, representatives of the government and courts, members of the councils of the regions of Belarus, and representatives of civil society. Quotas for local council and civil society members are selected by the Central Election Commission of Belarus, with the former including all members of the Minsk City Council and the latter comprising Belaya Rus, the Belarusian Civic Association of Veterans, the Belarusian Union of Women, the Belarusian Republican Youth Union, and the Federation of Trade Unions of Belarus.

== Criticism ==
Members of the Belarusian opposition are actively criticizing the Assemblies for allegedly being propaganda events organized to demonstrate unanimous support to the country's authoritarian leader Alexander Lukashenko. Members of the opposition have regularly been denied access to the Assembly or prevented from speaking at it. In 2006, presidential candidate and former rector of the Belarusian State University, Alyaksandr Kazulin, was beaten and detained by police after attempting to enter the All Belarusian People's Assembly. He was charged with disorderly conduct and released after being held in custody for eight hours.

Opposition parties have characterized the Assemblies as an "unconstitutional body" whose aim was to "delegitimize the institute of parliament in Belarus" and to "demonstrate nationwide support [to Alexander Lukashenko] ahead of the presidential elections".

Critics describe the procedure of appointing delegates to the Assembly as non-transparent and undemocratic, similar to the procedure of appointing delegates to the Congresses of the Communist Party of the Soviet Union during Soviet times.

The critics point out that the Assembly "cannot be accepted as a legitimate expresser of the will of the Belarusian people. It was formed by orders of the executive bodies and is not a representative democratic body. Given that only and exclusively supporters of the policies of the current government will be present at the so-called Assembly, this body is unable to accomplish the task of national consolidation."
