= Sergei Sivets =

Belarusian politician (born 1973)

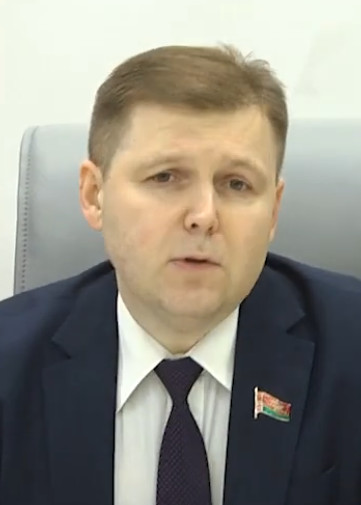
- Sivets in 2023

Member of the Council of the Republic
- Incumbent
- Assumed office 6 December 2019
- Constituency: Minsk City

Personal details
- Born: 11 September 1973 (age 52)

Sergei Mikhailovich Sivets (Russian: Сергей Михайлович Сивец; born 11 September 1973) is a Belarusian politician serving as a member of the Council of the Republic since 2019. He has been a member of the Presidium of the All-Belarusian People's Assembly since 2024.
