= Belarusian State University of Informatics and Radioelectronics =

Public university in Minsk, Belarus

Coordinates: 53°55′4″N 27°35′41″E

- Беларускі дзяржаўны ўніверсітэт інфарматыкі і радыёэлектронікі
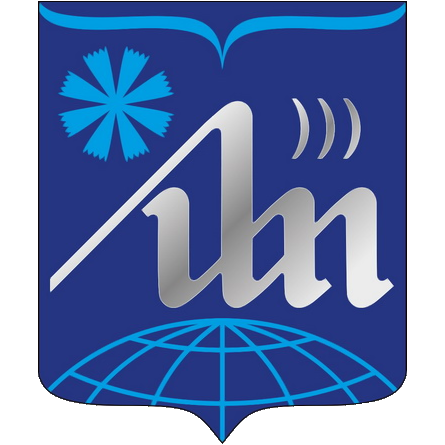
- Former name: Minsk Radioengineering Institute
- Motto: BSUIR — knowledge and lifestyle
- Type: Public
- Established: March 15, 1964
- Rector: Vadim Bogush
- Faculty: 725
- Administrative staff: 2200
- Students: 17,000
- Undergraduates: 15196
- Postgraduates: 875
- Doctoral students: 252
- Location: Minsk, Belarus
- Campus: Urban
- Website: www.bsuir.by

University rankings

Regional – Overall
- QS Emerging Europe and Central Asia: 129 (2022)

The Belarusian State University of Informatics and Radioelectronics, also known as BSUIR (Belarusian: Беларускі дзяржаўны ўніверсітэт інфарматыкі і радыёэлектронікі, romanized: Bielaruski dziaržaŭny ŭniviersitet infarmatyki i radyjoeliektroniki), is a public Higher Education Institution accredited by the Ministry of Education of the Republic of Belarus. Nowadays it is a large educational and scientific complex in Minsk, Belarus. BSUIR was founded on March 15, 1964, and plays a leading role in preparing its students in the fields of computer science, radioelectronics and telecommunications in Belarus.

Over 50,000 engineers and 1,000 PhD and DScs, successfully working in the most science-intensive fields of the Belarus economy, have graduated from the university. BSUIR employs 2 academicians and 2 corresponding members of the National Academy of Sciences of Belarus, 301 Professors, and 317 Doctors of Science. Circa 17,000 students are taking courses out of 108 degree and non-degree programs; over 500 are foreign students.

The University is made of 9 faculties, 32 chairs; Institute for Professional Development and Retraining of Top Managers and Specialists in Information Technologies and Radioelectronicsing (Institute of Information Technologies); R&D Unit. Educational process is supported by:

- 27 branches of academic departments at enterprises;
- 176 educational and research labs;
- 33 joint educational, research and production labs;
- 8 certified educational centres established in cooperation with such world leading companies as Microsoft, IBM, Cisco, National Instruments, INTES, SAP, NVIDIA, Forte Knowledge.

== History ==
On September 1, 1964, the Minsk Radioengineering Institute admitted students for the first time. The youngest state institute in Minsk was established on the campus of the oldest polytechnic institute in Belarus, and was designed to meet the republic's demand for highly qualified specialists in the evolving national radioelectronic industry. 2,500 students were enrolled in full-time and evening studies in two departments: the Department of Radioengineering and the Department of Automatics and Computers. 127 lecturers (including 2 professors and 30 senior lecturers) taught in the only building.

Belarusian State University of Informatics and Radioelectronics was the site of student rallies on September 30, 2020, to protest the detention of BSUIR students as part of the 2020–2021 Belarusian protests.

== Faculties ==
- Faculty of Computer-Aided Design (CAD)
- Faculty of Information Technologies and Control (ITC)
- Faculty of Radio Engineering and Electronics (RE)
- Faculty of Computer Systems and Networks (CSN)
- Faculty of Information Security (IS)
- Engineering and Economics Faculty (EEF)
- Faculty of Pre-University Training and Career Guidance (PUTCG)
- Military Faculty (MF)

=== Units / Subdivisions ===
- Institute for Advanced Training and Retraining “Institute of Information Technologies” (IIT BSUIR)
- State Educational Institution “Lyceum No. 1 of Minsk” under BSUIR (liquidated)
- Minsk Radioengineering College

== Student life ==
The training of scientists is conducted in graduate and doctoral courses in 23 fields. There are four Interdepartmental Specialized Scientific Councils for presenting theses for Doctor of Science and PhD degrees. Institutes of advanced and conversion training of management and specialists in information technologies and radioelectronics (the Institute of Information Technologies, or ITT) was established in BSUIR.

Due to the importance of mastering multiple languages, two departments teach English, French, German and Spanish. Original and modern methods of teaching foreign languages are employed, with an emphasis on understanding and translating scientific and technical literature. Students from other cities (and abroad) lodge at the residence halls, which have a capacity of 2,100. The dormitories are in central Minsk.

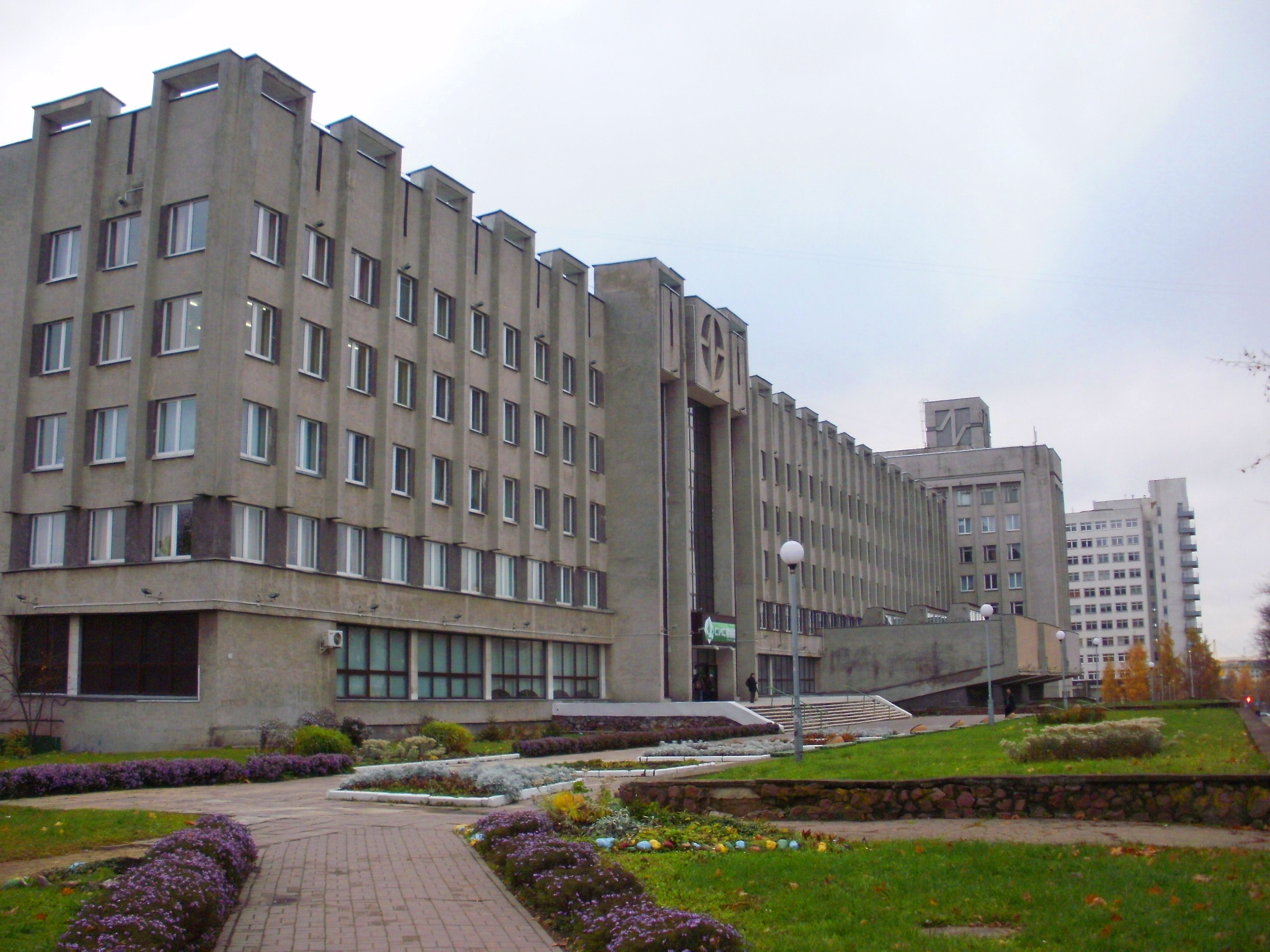
BSUIR buildings 4 and 5

The university prepares its engineering staff in 22 disciplines in the fields of computer facilities, computer science, radio engineering, microelectronics, telecommunications automated systems, artificial intelligence, automatic control, electronic apparatus and construction, medical electronics, and economics. About 9,000 students are engaged in daytime, evening, and correspondence training in 18 of 36 departments, including foreign students.

At the university the Institute of Improving Professional Skill program is available, along with information devices and computers; IT software and others. Among the staff are recipients of governmental awards and honours, noted educators, notable figures in science and engineering and renowned inventors and researchers from Belarus and Russia. In addition, the physical education faculty features trainers from Belarus and Russia. Professors and scientific staff of the BSUIR have been invited to deliver lectures at schools in Canada, the US, Germany, Portugal, Spain, China, Poland and other countries. The physical plant is housed in six buildings, with a modern laboratory and technological facilities.

Preparation of scientific staff for advanced degrees in Belarus and abroad is conducted in post-graduate courses and doctoral programs in 22 fields. More than 30 students from other schools in Belarus, from industry and rural areas are accepted annually for training in targeted post-graduate courses.

The primary purpose of scientific research at the university is to further the technical, social and economic development of Belarus.

== International cooperation ==
The main modes of BSUIR international cooperation are defined by the BSUIR Strategic Plan on International Cooperation Development, and include as follows:

- academic and scientific cooperation with foreign educational institutions and research centers under bilateral agreements;
- participation in various projects run by international funds and programmes;
- expanding of academic mobility of students and University staff;
- execution of international contracts for development and delivery of R&D products;
- organization of various on-campus conferences, participation of University students and staff in international fairs, conferences, symposia and seminars.

The University has bilateral agreements for cooperation with 25 universities:

- Germany: University of Wuppertal; High Technical and Economical School, Mittweida; Technical University, Aachen; High Technical School, Osnabrück.
- Poland: Białystok Technical University; Warsaw Technical University; University of Zielona Gora.
- China: Xidian University, Xi'an; Xi'an Institute of Technology; Zhejiang University, Hangzhou.
- France: University of the Mediterranean, Marseille; University of Technology, Troyes; National School of Engineers, Saint-Etienne.
- Russia: State Electrotechnic University, Saint-Petersburg; Kaliningrad Technical University; Moscow State University of Economics, Statistics and Informatics; Saint-Petersburg State University of Technology and Design; Taganrog State Radiotechnic University.
- United Kingdom: Brunel University, Uxbridge.
- Ukraine: National Technical University of Ukraine.
- Portugal: University of Aveiro, Portugal.
- Bulgaria: Technical University of Sofia.
- Latvia: Riga Technical University.

University staff and students take part in various international programs (DreamSpark, TEMPUS, IAESTE, Copernicus, FP7, ICST, DAAD) and receive research grants from the French Society of Scientific Research Support and the German Research Foundation.

The University fulfills scientific research contracts, and scientific and technical-developments supply for companies from China, India, Germany, Poland, Italy, Russia, and Ukraine. University teaching staff, scientists, students and post-graduates travel abroad for scientific evaluation and research, participating in conferences, workshops and exhibitions. The university presents its scientific and technical innovations both in Belarus and at international exhibitions in Germany (Hannover Messe, Cebit), Egypt (Cairo Exhibition), China, Libya, Syria, India, Vietnam and other countries. BSUIR organizes international conferences in physics, chemistry, application of nanostructures, neural networks, artificial intelligence, prospective display technologies, medical electronics and distance learning.

International seminars and conferences are held at the university on the regular basis. In 1997, the seminar "Management of Higher Educational Institutions" was held. Two German universities (the Higher Technical School of Mittweide and the University of Wuppertal) participated in the seminar. In 1998, the "Millennium Frontier: Prospects of German-Belarusian Cooperation in the 21st Century" international seminar took place at the university. It was sponsored by the German DAAD organization, which aims to promote interaction among foreign higher-education institutions with international exchange programs for students, postgraduates and scientists.

Undergraduate students from Syria, Lebanon, Pakistan, Nepal, Turkey, China, Jordan, Nigeria and India (and graduate students from Algeria and Poland) study on the contract basis at the university. During the past 35 years over 1,160 professors and students went abroad on exchange programs, and over 235 of them went for scientific evaluation. The international-program experience gained as a result of cooperation is applied to the educative process, in the publication of monographs and textbooks for postdoctoral projects.

== Sport ==
The Inter-University Department of Athletic Achievement, established in 1976, prepares student-athletes for national and international competition.

University teams regularly win athletic and fitness competitions. Among Belarusian athletes who trained at the university are Ivan Edeshko (Olympic champion basketball player) and Alexander Medved (vice-chair of the National Olympic Committee of Belarus, three-time Olympic and seven-time world champion). The university basketball team RTI-Minsk has participated in USSR and CIS championships for 30 years. BSUIR's best teams successfully participate in sporting events throughout Belarus, and a number of athletes are members of the national team in sports. Over 285 Masters of Sport and 600 candidates for the Master of Sport title have graduated from BSUIR over the past 40 years. Physical education consists of required classes, held in all departments four hours a week.
