= Constitutional Court of Belarus =

The Constitutional Court of the Republic of Belarus
- Interactive map of The Constitutional Court of the Republic of Belarus
- 53°54′01″N 27°33′58″E
- Established: April 28, 1994; 31 years ago
- Location: 4 Krasnoarmeyskaya Street, Minsk, Belarus
- Coordinates: 53°54′01″N 27°33′58″E
- Composition method: President of Belarus nomination with All-Belarusian People's Assembly confirmation
- Authorised by: Constitution of Belarus
- Judge term length: 11 years
- Number of positions: 12
- Website: www.kc.gov.by/en

Chairman of the Constitutional Court of the Republic of Belarus
- Currently: Pyotr Miklashevich
- Since: 8 February 2008

The Constitutional Court of Belarus is the only court in the country, which has the power of constitutional review. The main purpose of the court is to render justice, when the question is whether an act of National Assembly of the Republic of Belarus or a local law contradicts the Constitution of Belarus.

== Composition ==
The court consists of twelve judges, who are appointed for eleven-year terms with a possibility of reappointment. All judges must be "highly qualified specialists" in the field of law. They are nominated by the President of Belarus and confirmed by the All-Belarusian People's Assembly.

Prior to the 2022 constitutional amendments, the age limit for judges was 70 years old. Additionally, six judges were appointed by the upper house of Parliament and six by the President.

== List of chairmen ==
No.	Name	Term			Notes
No.	Name	Start	End	Duration	Notes
1	Valery Tikhinya	23 March 1995 (Note: He served as a deputy chairman since the court was established, while the position of chairman had been vacant.)	4 December 1996	8 months and 11 days	Resigned in protest of the 1996 referendum.
2	Grigory Vasilevich	4 January 1997	11 January 2008	11 years and 7 days	
3	Pyotr Miklashevich	8 February 2008	Current	18 years, 1 month and 7 days	

== See also ==
- Constitution of Belarus
