= Yuri Shuleiko =

Belarusian politician (born 1968)

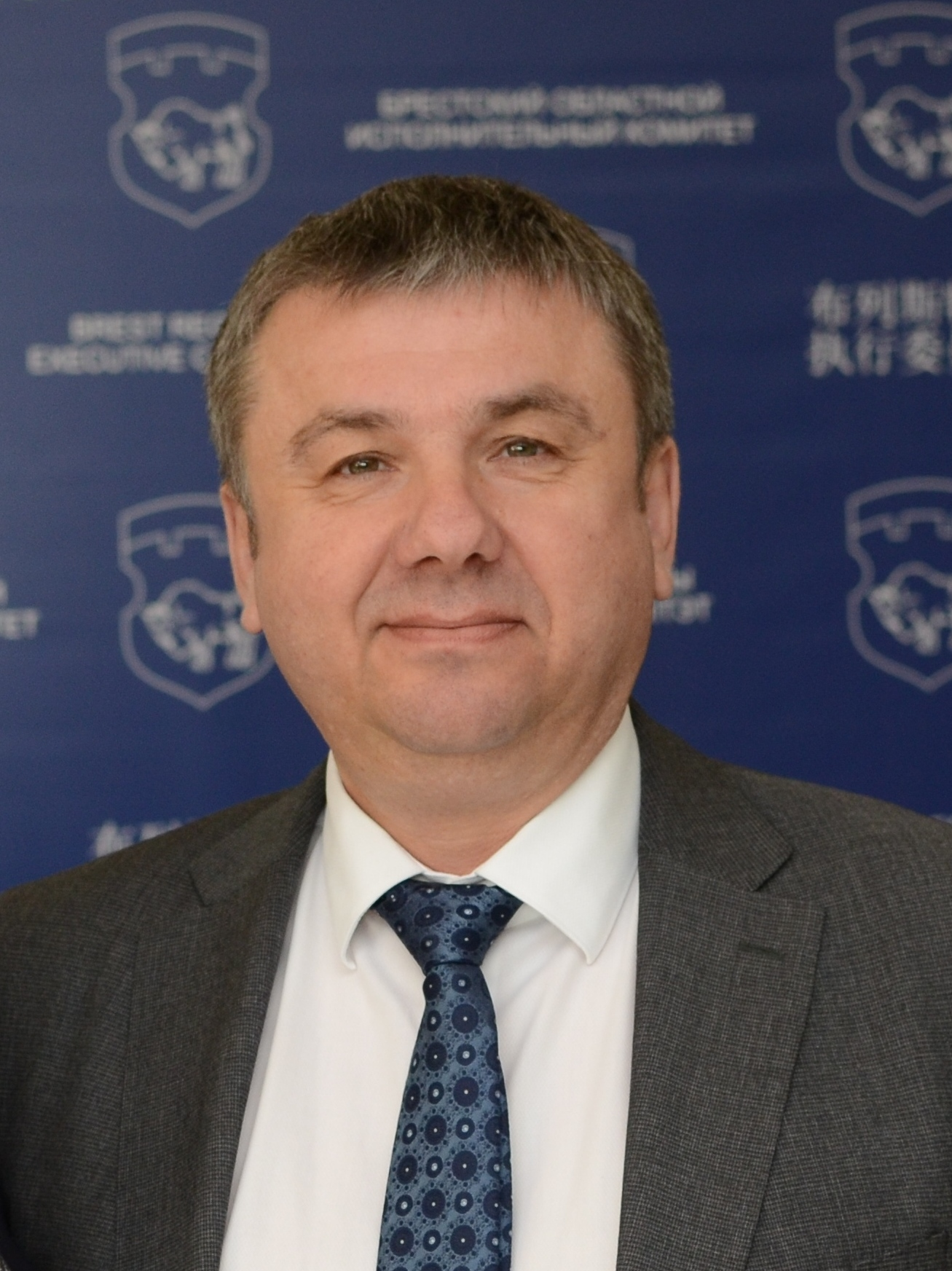
- Shuleiko in 2021

Deputy Prime Minister
- Incumbent
- Assumed office 27 June 2024
- President: Alexander Lukashenko
- Prime Minister: Roman Golovchenko
- Preceded by: Leonid Zayats

Governor of the Brest Region
- In office 26 January 2021 – 27 June 2024
- President: Alexander Lukashenko
- Preceded by: Anatoly Lis
- Succeeded by: Piotr Parkhomchik

Personal details
- Born: 31 March 1968 (age 58)

Yuri Vitoldovich Shuleiko (Russian: Юрий Витольдович Шулейко; born 31 March 1968) is a Belarusian politician serving as deputy prime minister since 2024. From 2021 to 2024, he served as governor of the Brest Region.

In 2022, Shuleiko was added to the sanctions lists of the European Union, Switzerland, the United Kingdom, Ukraine and Canada in relation to the Russian invasion of Ukraine.
