= Natalya Kochanova =

Belarusian politician

Natalia Kochanova
- Наталля Качанава; Наталья Кочанова
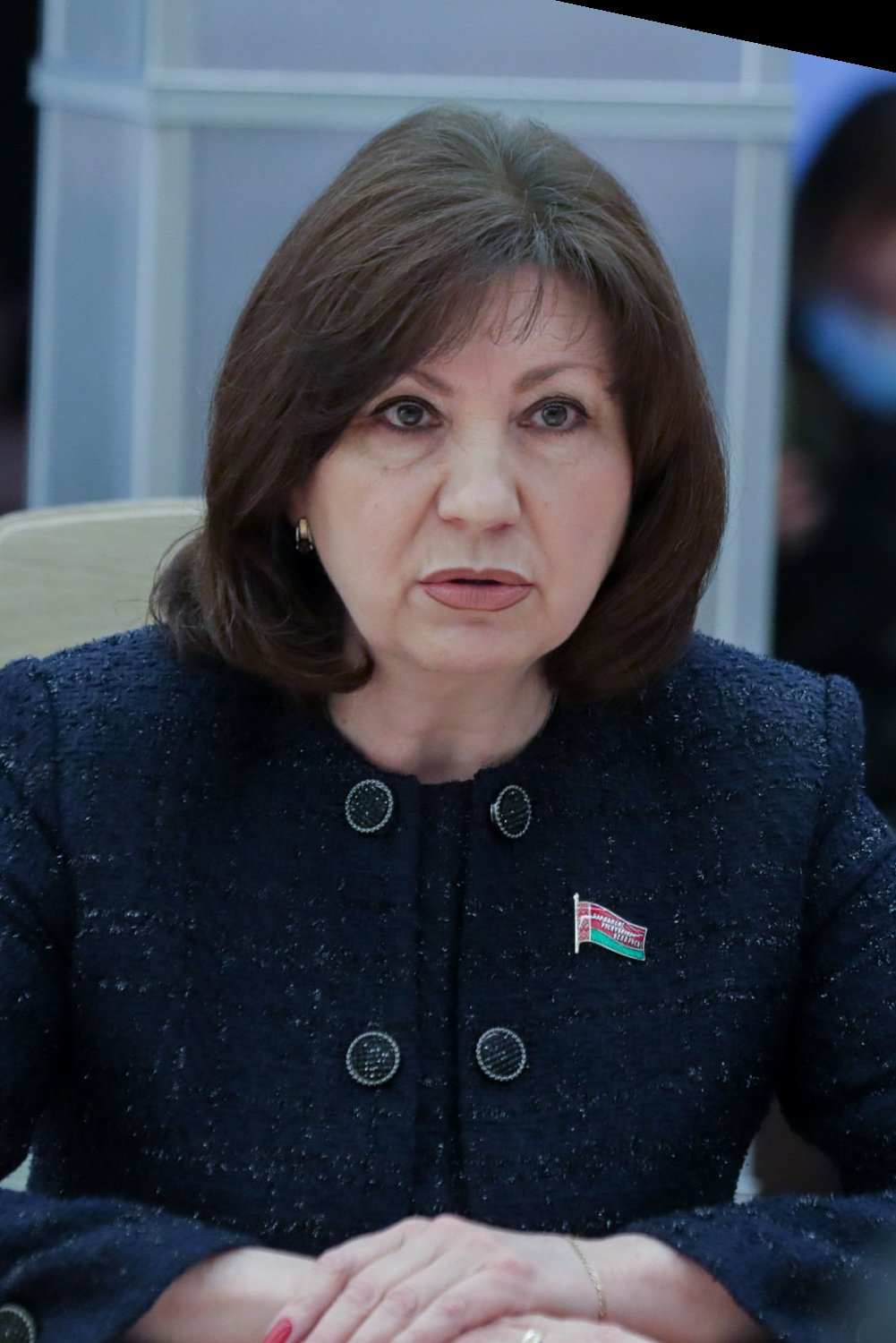
- Kochanova in 2021

Speaker of the Council of the Republic
- Incumbent
- Assumed office 6 December 2019
- President: Alexander Lukashenko
- Prime Minister: Sergei Rumas; Roman Golovchenko
- Preceded by: Mikhail Myasnikovich

Chief of Staff to President
- In office 21 December 2016 – 5 December 2019
- President: Alexander Lukashenko
- Preceded by: Alexander Kosinets
- Succeeded by: Igor Sergeenko

Personal details
- Born: 25 September 1960 (age 66) Polotsk, Belarusian SSR, Soviet Union (now Belarus)
- Party: Belaya Rus (since 2023)
- Children: 2
- Education: Novopolotsk Polytechnic Institute; Academy of Public Administration

Natalia Ivanovna Kochanova (Note: Belarusian: Наталля Іванаўна Качанава, romanized: Natalla Ivanawna Kačanava; Russian: Наталья Ивановна Кочанова, romanized: Natalja Ivanovna Kočanova) (née Tolkachiova; (Note: Belarusian: Талкачова, romanized: Tałkačova; Russian: Толкачёва, romanized: Tolkačjova) born 25 September 1960) is a Belarusian politician who has been Speaker of the Council of the Republic of Belarus since December 2019.

== Early life and career ==
Kochanova was born on 25 September 1960 in Polotsk. Her father was a blacksmith and her mother worked in a garment factory. She has two brothers. She grew up in a communal apartment and studied at the Novopolotsk Polytechnic Institute, graduating in 1982. In 2006, she graduated from the Academy of Public Administration under the President of the Republic of Belarus.

Kochanova worked as a remote control operator at Polotsk's water treatment facility from 1982 until 1987. She was promoted to the public service and was head of the housing department and member of the city's executive committee until 2002.

== Early political career ==
In November 2007, Kochanova became mayor of Novopolotsk. Five years later, in 2012, she became Deputy Chairperson of the Standing Commission Council of the National Assembly for legislation and state building. In 2014, Kochanova was appointed Deputy Prime Minister by President Alexander Lukashenko.

== Chief of Staff and Council of the Republic ==
On 21 December 2016, Kochanova was appointed Chief of Staff to the President of Belarus and Head of the Presidential Administration of Belarus by Lukashenko, who is known as Europe's "last dictator". At the time Lukashenko called her an "ardent supporter of the state policy." She is one of his key supporters and advisors. Political scientist Dmitry Bolkunets has suggested that Kochanova could be seen by Lukashenko as a possible successor. However, Lukashenko himself has previously said that a woman cannot be the President.

In December 2019, Lukashenko sent Kochanova to the Council of the Republic under the presidential quota, replacing her as head of the Presidential Administration with former Deputy Chair of the KGB Igor Sergeenko. Kochanova was elected speaker of the council on 6 December 2019, receiving 59 of the 60 votes. She is the first woman to hold the position.

In January 2020, Kochanova met with United Kingdom ambassador Jacqueline Perkins seeking to deepen ties between the two countries. In April 2020, Kochanova was asked by Lukashenko to invite the World Health Organization to assess the performance of Belarus's healthcare system in response to the COVID-19 pandemic. She said there was no need for emergency measures and the economy should keep working as usual.

== 2020 presidential election and aftermath ==
Kochanova was Chief of Staff for Lukashenko's election campaign in August 2020, who covers the bloody regime and repressions of Lukashenko's forces. After over 7,000 people were arrested during August 2020 protests calling for Lukashenko's resignation after the disputed election, Kochanova spoke on Lukashenko's behalf about the release of 1,000 of those arrested, saying they were now "under the obligation not to participate in unauthorized activities." She said, "We don't need unrest. We don't need war." On 15 August, thousands of protestors outside the state television building demanded full coverage of the protests. After television staff joined them, Kochanova arrived, but was unable to pacify the crowd. The following day, state television reported on the protests for the first time.

Opening the fourth session of the National Assembly on 2 October 2020, Kochanova said, "The election campaign was held in difficult conditions. We witnessed unconcealed external pressure on our country and the aggravation of an unhealthy public situation by internal destructive forces. People made their choice in support of the incumbent President, in favor of stability, peace, tranquility, and the policy pursued in the country." She also said, "Lies and misleading information about the country is being spread ... We, the members of the Council of the Republic, strongly condemn the gross interference of Poland, Lithuania, Latvia, Ukraine and other foreign countries in the internal affairs of Belarus." Later in October, the Council of Europe issued a statement condemning any further use of violence in Belarus, including "disproportionate use of force by the authorities against protestors." Kochanova issued a statement in response, saying the West receives "one-sided information" on the situation in Belarus from people who "do not represent the majority of citizens who supported the country's course during the presidential election." She said Belarus was "ready to discuss the situation in the country with foreign partners, subject to mutual respect, objectivity, consideration of the parties' interests and non-interference with internal affairs."

After the German Bundestag adopted a resolution on 4 November 2020 rejecting the results of the presidential election as neither free nor fair, denying the legitimacy of Lukashenko and calling for a new vote, Kochanova and Chair of the House of Representatives, Vladimir Andreichenko, issued a joint statement. They called the resolution "blatant interference" in Belarus' affairs, saying they were "utterly bewildered" by German support for open calls for "terrorist activities". The statement said, "By the Resolution the Bundestag undermines the progress achieved in relations between Belarus and Germany, and panders to the mercenary interests of individual politicians who are trying to earn political capital on the image of "fighters for democracy in Belarus" while ignoring the harsh repressive actions of law enforcement agencies in their own country."

In November 2020, Kochanova held an unsuccessful meeting with student protesters at Belarusian State University. She denied vote rigging and torture of those detained, but the students protested her comments. She said, "I thought that we will come out of here and ... be friends. But I am very saddened by the fact that today the framework of human norms and morality is being shattered ... when an adult woman like me is standing in front of you, and you shout in her face, this is rude and unacceptable." While answering the students' questions, Kochanova used "Dulles' Plan" conspiracy theory to explain the situation in Belarus.

On 18 November 2020, Kochanova had a meeting with local deputies and officials of Polotsk and Novopolotsk. According to the leaked audio recording, she claimed that the protests had been organized from abroad, declared the photos of the people beaten by the police to be fake, supported expulsion of students from the universities for political reasons.

On 27 November 2020, the Council of the CIS Interparliamentary Assembly awarded Kochanova with its medal "For Strengthening Parliamentary Cooperation."

Due to her role, Kochanova was sanctioned by the EU, the United Kingdom, and Switzerland; she is also subject to the U.S. Department of the Treasury sanctions. In 2022, she was also blacklisted by Japan, Ukraine and Canada.

In 2021, ethnologist Uladzimir Lobač fired from the Polack State University claimed that his forced leave was the result of pressure of Natalya Kochanova and Igor Marzalyuk on the university.

== Personal life ==
Kochanova is married and has two daughters.

== Notes ==
Political offices
Preceded by Mikhail Myasnikovich	Speaker of the Council of the Republic of Belarus; 2019-present	Incumbent
