= Anatoly Lebedko =

Belarusian politician and pro-democracy activist

- Анатоль Лябедзька
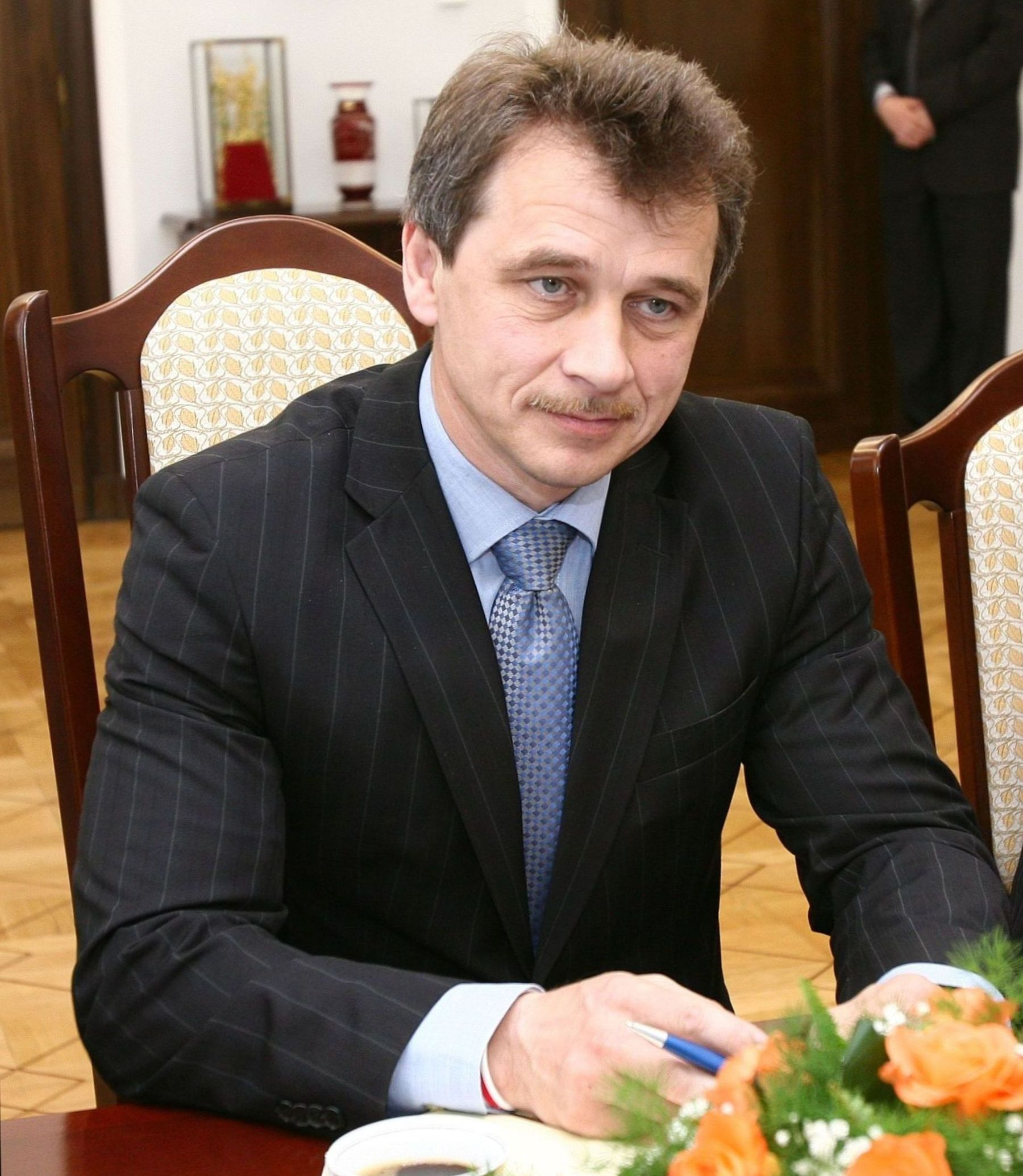
- Lebedko in 2008
- Born: 27 June 1961 (age 65); Trylies, Byelorussian SSR, Soviet Union (now Belarus)
- Political party: United Civic Party
- Movement: Belarusian opposition

Anatoly Vladimirovich Lebedko (Belarusian: Анато́ль Уладзі́міравіч Лябе́дзька, romanized: Anatol Uladzimiravič Liabedzka [anˈtolʲ lʲaˈbʲedzʲka]; Russian: Анато́лий Влади́мирович Лебе́дько; born 27 June 1961) is a Belarusian politician and pro-democracy activist who is currently the head of the United Civic Party, an opposition party.

== Life ==
Born in the village of Trylies, then part of the Stoŭbtsy Raion within the Minsk Region of the Soviet Union's Byelorussian Soviet Socialist Republic, Lebedko emerged in the 1990s as one of the leading critics of Belarusian President Alexander Lukashenko, whom Lebedko, along with other opposition leaders and many western governments, considers a dictator.

Lebedko's strident opposition to Lukashenka led to increasingly bitter confrontations with the Belarusian authorities through the late 1990s and into the 2000s. He was arrested numerous times for participating in unsanctioned protests and marches, including the 1999 Freedom March; was charged with libel against Lukashenko several times; and was beaten outside his home by masked men he alleges were connected to Lukashenko. Lebedko appears to have drawn particular ire for his relatively high visibility and frequent contact with groups outside Belarus, who Lukashenko accuses of meddling in Belarus's internal affairs. In particular, one of Lebedko's arrests came shortly after he had spoken on the floor of the United States Senate and at a meeting of the Organization for Security and Cooperation in Europe (OSCE) in October 1999, prompting letters of protest from both bodies.

Following an October 2004 election, which combined a referendum on permitting Lukashenko a third term with parliamentary elections, Lebedko led slightly over a thousand opposition protestors into the streets of Minsk on 18–19 October. Lebedko and other opposition leaders charged that the elections were rigged, an accusation echoed by OSCE election monitors. During the second day of protests on October 19, Lebedko was arrested along with two other opposition leaders, Mikola Statkevich and Paval Sieviaryniets, as well as an Associated Press photographer who had been covering the protest. Lebedko's supporters claim he was severely beaten by riot police following his arrest; he ended up in the hospital, reportedly with fractured skull, broken ribs and internal injuries.

At the Congress of Democratic Forces in October 2005, he lost by just a few votes to Alaksandar Milinkievič, who became (with Lebedko's subsequent support) the opposition's primary candidate in the 2006 Belarusian presidential election.

Currently, Lebedko functions as Representative for the Constitutional Reform and Parliamentary Cooperation in the office of Sviatlana Tsikhanouskaya.
