= Vadim Popov =

Belarusian-Russian politician (1940–2026)

- Вадим Попов (Russian); Вадзім Папоў (Belarusian)

Speaker of the House of Representatives
- In office 2 October 2007 – 27 October 2008
- President: Alexander Lukashenko
- Prime Minister: Sergei Sidorsky
- Preceded by: Vladimir Konoplev
- Succeeded by: Vladimir Andreichenko
- In office 21 November 2000 – 16 November 2004
- Prime Minister: Vladimir Yermoshin; Gennady Novitsky
- Preceded by: Anatoly Malofeyev
- Succeeded by: Vladimir Konoplev

Minister of Agriculture and Food
- In office 14 July 2000 – 22 November 2000
- Preceded by: Yuri Dmitrievich Moroz
- Succeeded by: Mikhail Rusy

First Secretary of the Mogilev Regional Committee of the Byelorussian SSR
- In office 28 October 1990 – 25 August 1991
- Preceded by: Vasily Leonov
- Succeeded by: Position abolished

Personal details
- Born: 5 July 1940 Demidov, Smolensk Oblast, Russian SFSR, Soviet Union
- Died: 7 September 2026 (aged 86) Minsk, Belarus
- Party: Communist Party of the Soviet Union
- Occupation: Politician

Vadim Aleksandrovich Popov (Russian: Вадим Александрович Попов, Belarusian: Вадзім Аляксандравіч Папоў, romanized: Vadzim Aljaksandravič Papoŭ; 5 July 1940 – 7 September 2026) was a Belarusian and Russian politician. He served two terms as Speaker of the House of Representatives of Belarus from 2000 to 2004 and again from 2007 to 2008, and was also briefly Minister of Agriculture and Food in 2000. He was considered an ally to President Alexander Lukashenko, aligning with many of his policies.

Born in Demidov in the Russian SFSR, Popov was initially a mechanic at state farms in Smolensk, but moved to the Byelorussian SSR sometime in the late 1960s. In Belarus he became highly active in politics, instructing the Mogilev committee of the Komsomol, and was First Secretary in the Krasnapollye district and later Asipovichy. His most notable position during the Soviet Union-era was becoming the Chairman of the Mogilev Regional Committee in 1990, right before the nation's collapse. He returned to politics after a brief stint in the private sector, becoming Minister of Agriculture and Food for a few months in 2000.

After being elected to the House of Representatives for Asipovichy in October 2000, he suddenly won the seat of chairman in November, a fact that was considered a heavy surprise. His first term saw him closely align himself with Alexander Lukashenko's policies and squashing talks of the Belarusian opposition, notably refusing to negotiate with a hunger strike from three members of the house who accused Lukashenko of not listening to the opposition's proposals. He was dismissed in November 2004, but returned to the post in October 2007, this time representing Klichev. His second term saw him not to do many actions except refuse to accredit the newspaper Narodnaja Volya. He was again dismissed in October 2008, and until his death on 2026, he was a member of the Council of the Republic.

== Early life ==
Popov was born on 5 July 1940 in Demidov, which is part of the Demidovsky District, in the Russian SFSR. He first started working at the Betishchevsky state farm in the Smolensk region in 1957 as a worker at the farm. He then briefly worked as a mechanic and foreman at another state farm specializing in sugar beet production at the Troitsky District, and then served in the Soviet Army from 1961 to 1964.

Afterward, he did a variety of positions, becoming an instructor and the head of the department at Krichevsky SPTV-38. It was also around this time he moved to Belarus, becoming the 2nd Secretary of the Krychaw district and also 1st Secretary of the Krasnapollye district. He also instructed the Mogilev regional committee of the Komsomol, which he later called "the best part of my life".

After abandoning his education for farmer work, he returned to the educational sphere in 1971 graduating from the Belarusian State University of Agricultural Technology and then in 1984 from the Minsk Higher Party School. He also worked while obtaining his degrees, as he was the director of the Kalinin state farm in the Krasnapollye district, which was described as having been in ruins when he came to the farm but was transformed when he was director. From 1977 to 1979 he was the instructor of the Central Committee of the CPB and then from 1979 to 1982 1st Secretary of Asipovichy. Popov was then First Secretary of the Mogilev Regional Committee from October 1990 until the position was abolished after the creation of an independent Belarus. In 1993 he became Deputy General Director of the Mogilev-Blagrosnab Joint-Stock Company and since 1995 General Director of the Agromashservice Holding. He first joined the agricultural department of Belarus in 1999, becoming First Deputy Member in March.

== Political career ==
=== Minister of Agriculture and Food ===
On 14 July 2000, he was appointed Minister of Agriculture and Food. However, he was dismissed in order to be the representative of the government to the joint-stock commercial bank Belagroprombank. He was officially dismissed on 22 November 2000.

=== Speaker of the House of Representatives ===
==== First term ====
On 15 October 2000 he was elected as a deputy of the House of Representatives of the second convocation for Asipovichy electoral district No. 74. In the first meeting of the chamber on 21 November 2000, he was appointed the convocation's Speaker of the House of Representatives. His win was considered a surprise, as Vladimir Konoplev had already collected signatures, but suddenly withdrew after Alexander Lukashenko said in a meeting with the deputies the Friday before the election to vote for Popov. The competitor for speaker was the head of the humanitarian aid department, Viktor Kuchynsky, for whom Ivan Pashkevich campaigned for, and was also considered a member of Lukashenko's friends. Popov nominated himself as being in line with the sentiments of Lukashenko, outlining the provisions they have worked on.

During his first term as speaker, he was known for aligning himself closely with Alexander Lukashenko's policies and squashing talks of the Belarusian opposition. He also issued an order to deprive the Members of Parliament Vladimir Parfenovich, Valery Fralou, and Syarhei Skrabets of their bonuses after they went on a hunger strike alleging that Lukashenko did not listen to any of their proposals as part of the opposition. He was dismissed on 16 November 2004 as a new election was declared.

During the period between his first term as speaker and his second term, he became Chairman of the Commission on International Affairs and Relation to CIS in the House of Representatives. In this role he made a statement about the Hague Tribunal, calling Slobodan Milošević a moral winner and implied that the leadership of the tribunal benefited from the death of Milosevic, since they could not prove any charges brought against him.

==== Second term ====
After initially retiring at the age of 67, he announced his candidacy for speaker which was supported by 94 deputies with 13 against, with the only competition for speaker being Sergei Gaidukevich, who nominated himself. He was declared Speaker on 2 October 2007, when the first session of the house began.

Popov represented the Klichev electoral district No. 68 during this period. He was also part of the Standing Committee of the Council of the Republic on Economy, Budget, and Finance. Popov was also a member of the Supreme State Council of the Union State. He also did not respond to Narodnaja Volya, a staunchly anti-Lukashenko newspaper, after it was suddenly denied accreditation for which they sued during his tenure as speaker.

He was dismissed on 27 October 2008 when a new election was called.

=== Later career ===
Popov was a member of the Council of the Republic. He held the position of Chairman of the Standing Committee on Economy, Budget and Finance of the Council from 2008 to his death in 2026.

== Death ==
Popov died on 7 September 2026, at the age of 86.

== Honours and awards ==
- Order of the Red Banner of Labour (1976)
- Certificate of Honor of the Supreme Soviet of the BSSR (1970)
- Certificate of Honor of the National Assembly of the Republic of Belarus
- Order of the Commonwealth (CIS; 25 March 2002)
- Order of the Fatherland III degree (14 October 2004)
- Medal of IPA CIS 25 years
