= George Pusenkoff =

Russian and German painter, artist and photographer

- Born: Pusenkoff; 1953 (age 72–73); Krasnapolle, Byelorussian SSR, Soviet Union
- Known for: Postmodernism, appropriation art, abstract art
- Movement: Abstract painting, Figurative painting

George Pusenkoff (Russian: Гео́ргий Никола́евич Пузенко́в; born 1953) is a Russian and German painter, installation artist and photographer. He is a representative of postmodernism.

== Biography ==
George Pusenkoff studied computer science from 1971 to 1976 at the National Research University of Electronic Technology in Moscow. From 1977 to 1983 he studied art (Graphics and Painting) at the then Moscow Polygraphic Institute, today the Moscow State University of Printing Arts. Since 1984 he has participated in exhibition projects in Moscow, the whole USSR and abroad. During his time in the USSR, Pusenkoff was one of the Russian Nonconformists. In 1987 he joined the artists' association Ermitage and in 1988 he became a member of the Moscow Gruppe 88. He has also been a member of the MOSKh (Moscow Union of Artists) since 1987. On invitation of the gallery owner Hans Mayer, Pusenkoff went to (Germany) in 1990 and has lived and worked in Cologne ever since. Pusenkoff is Jewish. In 2008 Pusenkoff was nominated for the Kandinsky Prize.

== Artistic work ==
In his works, Pusenkoff often refers to art-historically significant events of the 20th century. In the beginnings of his artistic career Pusenkoff was close to Appropriation Art, since the 2000s he has increasingly turned to Abstract Art. His paintings are now dominated by color, line, and surface. These works in which he quotes from art history appear very catchy and "familiar", because the viewer already knows them in other contexts, such as the famous Black Square by Kasimir Malevich. Pusenkoff also quotes or modifies, for example, works by Josef Albers (Homage to Albers, 1998), Robert Rauschenberg (Erased Rauschenberg, 1997), Piet Mondrian (Mondrian 2, 1999) and other important artists of historical significance. These works of Pusenkoff are to be understood and perceived as a statement about the present; cultural criticism takes immanently place in the image. For Pusenkoff, good art is always also an artistic examination of the Zeitgeist. For him this means dealing with the upheavals of our time through the Information Age emergence of computers on an artistic level: "Pusenkoff is a conceptual painter in the sense that he doesn't work spontaneously and intuitively, but that a reflection on questions of image formation, perception, the original and painting in the media age is the basis of his art." (in German: "Pusenkoff ist ein konzeptueller Maler in dem Sinne, daß [!] er nicht spontan und intuitiv ans Werk geht, sondern ein Nachdenken über Fragen der Bildentstehung, der Wahrnehmung, des Originals und der Malerei im Medienzeitalter Grundlage seiner Kunst ist.")

In 1993 Pusenkoff had the opportunity of a solo exhibition in a room of the Tretyakov Gallery. The room, which was not originally designed as an exhibition space, was dominated by a 42-meter-long front window, which directed the viewer's gaze outwards and not to the exhibited works of art inside. Pusenkoff developed an installation for this room in which the front window was covered by a wooden wall. The works of art were then installed on this wall: "To block off an enormous windowfront, I built a wall measuring six meters high and 42 meters long. This surface was covered by 24 paintings, each two-by-two meters, as well as 600 smaller copies of these arranged to a particular pattern. The whole resembled an endlessly unfolding molecular matrix. Of major importance was the contrast between the space of the room and that of the window-wall."

Pusenkoff's painting said Duchamp, in which he integrated an image of Mona Lisa into his work for the first time, was created especially for this exhibition. It shows a smiling Frank Sinatra as a reminiscence of Readymades of Marcel Duchamp and the Mona Lisa. Pusenkoff explains: "Actually, the picture was thus created for a very special place on this wall and became a key work for the entire installation." In 2008 the installation The Wall was shown for the first time in the West on the occasion of a comprehensive art exhibition in the Kunstmuseum Bochum La Condition Humaine.

The fusion of digital techniques with representations of well-known icons of art history leads to works of art that are striking and reminiscent of Pop Art. Pusenkoff's art was therefore often compared with Andy Warhols. Like Warhol, Pusenkoff also uses reproductions and sequences, uses bright colors, and thematizes the comprehensive availability of art objects in the media age. Warhol's art was primarily concerned with revealing the industrial manufacturing process of art in The Work of Art in the Age of Mechanical Reproduction. Pusenkoff's theme, on the other hand, is the significance of painting as an antithesis to the computer-generated flood of images of the present: "I love painting," says Pusenkoff, and his entire oeuvre impressively testifies to this preference.

=== Computer Interface and Pixel ===
Although Pusenkoff defines himself as a classical painter, he uses the possibilities of the computer to create his works. He loads pictures from the Internet onto his computer, edits them using Photoshop, enlarges or reduces sections, erases them with a digital eraser, etc. He then uses the computer to create his works. In the next work step a plotter produces films, in which the represented motif dissolved in light and dark, and the parts previously marked by Cohen are pre-punched. They are cut out of the foils and transferred to the canvas. The artist then applies eight to twelve layers of acrylic paint, partly mixed with sand, so that relief-like raised parts form in the picture. This technique of image processing is called Pochoir."

In 1996, Pusenkoff painted a work depicting a Windows screen (Big Square (1:1)). The picture shows the screen in detail with all the task bars. At the top is the title of the file Square, next to it the information that this image is displayed in the image editing software in the ratio 1:1, so this image has the same size as the original. Below is information about how much space this file needs – 28 KB. Nothing in the picture reveals an artistic comment of any kind, it is a pure image of a user interface. And yet it is not.

By describing the computer interface as a "window," Microsoft unconsciously gives the computer the role that the panel painting had before the advent of mass media. Already in 1435 the architect Leon Battista Alberti described in his work de pictura the painted picture as a "window to the world". The central element of the new technology is the pixel that constantly returns in Pusenkoff's pictures: "What a good graphics card and a fast computer make forget when the picture appears on the screen, Pusenkoff wants to raise awareness as a painter, namely the pixel and thus the media character, the 'madeness' of the seemingly so immaterial virtual picture worlds." (in German: "Was eine gute Grafikkarte und ein schneller Rechner vergessen lassen, wenn das Bild auf dem Bildschirm erscheint, das möchte Pusenkoff als Maler ins Bewusstsein heben, nämlich das Pixel und damit den medialen Charakter, die 'Gemachtheit' auch der scheinbar so unstofflichen virtuellen Bildwelten.")

Many of Pusenkoff's works show components of a computer screen, and the work titles also repeatedly refer to the possibilities of the computer in the design of images, such as "Cancel" (Who is afraid Cancel Cancel, 1998), "Matrix" (Paint Matrix, 2001) or "Erased" (Erased Painting, 2003). The human being who processes, manipulates, distorts, brings images into other contexts and can share them with other users on the computer seems godlike. He masters everything and is himself untouchable behind his computer. Pusenkoff's works irritate by imitating the screen surface. The viewer believes he sees a work of art that he can change and design. But in reality it is a painted picture that is unchangeable. This irritation is intended by the artist: "Moreover, I am sure that constant irritation is the main condition for the perception of any artistic language."

Virtually you can experience and understand everything, but man is not only his consciousness, he is also and above all a body. The virtual world does not reach it. There is a big difference whether one stands directly in front of a painted work of art, or whether one looks at virtual pictures on the computer. In the one case you stand as a three-dimensional being in a real space in front of the artwork and react to it with your entire body-mind-mind continuum – in the other case you yourself are reduced to a virtual being in which only consciousness counts. By transforming the surface of the virtual screen into a real touchable panel painting, Pusenkoff invites the viewer to become aware of this revolutionary change in his sensory perception. Colour, haptics, the use of light in his works – all this has an effect on the body and mind of the viewer and has an energizing effect. According to Pusenkoff, the computer itself can neither produce art nor create a deep space between viewer and observer that would lead to a resonant vibration. In this context, Pusenkoff's pictures seem like exclamation marks: "Look, this is how the computer changes us".

=== Mona Lisa in the work of Pusenkoff ===
Leonardo da Vincis masterpiece Mona Lisa has become part of our cultural memory and has inspired many artists of the 20th century to create their own works with the painting. Pusenkoff also dealt with the Mona Lisa. In 1993 he painted his first work with an image of the Mona Lisa. Its title is said Duchamp. Since then, he has repeatedly worked with the image of Mona Lisa, to an extent as no other artist before him:" For Pusenkoff, the Mona Lisa has become his female alter ego, an iconic representation of his own artistic identity."

==== Single Mona Lisa (1:1) ====
In 1997 he created probably his best known work of the Mona Lisa with his drawing Single Mona Lisa (1:1). It shows the face of the young woman, colored by Pusenkoff in white, black and yellow. He first downloaded the picture digitally from the Louvre's website, then edited it on the computer and then painted it with acrylic paint on canvas. The work shows – as usual for Pusenkoff – a computer frame around the face of the Mona Lisa, task bars are shown as if one could edit the picture, at the top is the title of the picture Single Mona Lisa (1:1), at the bottom is the file size in megabytes. Again, the illusion is perfect that this is a pure digital copy of Leonardo Da Vinci's artwork. But not only it is a painted picture, also the picture detail, which Pusenkoff chose, differs from the original. Pusenkoff says: "I tried various things with a pixel brush, created concentrations of pixel modules, placed them in different sizes and as accents on different places on the face. I wanted even the abstraction to breathe and vibrate like the original."

The fact that Leonardo da Vinci's work became a media icon in the course of the 20th century is the reason why the Pusenkoff's work can nevertheless create the impression of the original in the viewer. Pusenkoff says: "When an old Russian icon-painter paints an icon, he doesn't paint the picture of a saint but the saint himself in the form of color. What results is an identification between the painting and that which is painted. My picture can say: I am the Mona Lisa. When you see me, you see the Mona Lisa, you remember her. In the memory of the viewers who have seen my picture, what remains is that they have seen the Mona Lisa, not a picture of the Mona Lisa i have painted."

==== Mona Lisa Travels ====
In 1998 the painting Single Mona Lisa was exhibited at the Russian Museum in St. Petersburg. Pusenkoff himself transported the work of art by car from Moscow to St. Petersburg and spontaneously took photographs of the work in front of various backgrounds. As a result, he travelled with the artwork through all of Russia and photographed it in various situations. The photos were taken with a medium format camera and show very different situations. Pusenkoff arranged the picture details according to purely artistic considerations and included effects such as reflections or light and shadow in his conception: "I see a location where i think the Mona Lisa would function well. The goal of the action is to make a photo and not merely to arrange a beautiful or poetic moment. I have to balance the Mona Lisa in the surroundings so that the photo on the one hand seems harmonious but, on the other, captures the surprising act of the moment. And most of the time the performance is also ended with the photo."
Some examples of these illustrations with his work Single Mona Lisa are mentioned here: One can see e.g. market scenes with Pusenkoff's Mona Lisa, a dacha with the picture; Pusenkoff also brought the picture to the ship Aurora, which played an important role in the October Revolution. In the Russian Museum he photographed his work in front of famous Russian works of art of the 19th century; he placed it in front of monuments, positioned it in front of a blue church at the entrance door, showed homeless people in front of the picture and contrasted it with a shot of his Mona Lisa in the casino of St. Petersburg. The most spectacular picture is a shot of an elephant balancing the work in its trunk – a shot made possible because there was a shooting for a movie with an elephant in a Moscow suburb at the time. So far the painting has travelled through Russia, Israel, Germany and Italy.

==== Mona Lisa Time Tower ====
In 2002 Pusenkoff started working on his project Mona Lisa 500. The starting point for this project was an invitation from the Tretyakov Gallery for a solo exhibition in 2004, and the 500th birthday of the original painting. Together with the then director of Museum Ludwig, Marc Scheps, Pusenkoff developed the concept of making 500 versions of his painting Single Mona Lisa (1:1) produced in silkscreen appearing together in one installation. A huge round tower with a diameter of ten meters, an extent of 30 meters and a height of six meters was created. The exterior of the tower consists of 500 squares made of aluminium, measuring 60 × 60 × 4 cm, coated with black industrial lacquer, which brilliantly reflect the surroundings and sunlight. For the entrance to the walk-in installation, 8 squares were removed. From the inside, the viewer is confronted with 500 screen-printed versions of the painting Single Mona Lisa (1:1), gleaming in all the colours of the rainbow. The particular challenge was to bring the colours close to those of a rainbow in a natural-looking colour gradient: "I thought one could simply pick the colors from an RAL chart and the smooth transitions would come about automatically. But with the standard values one doesn't achieve the fluid transitions and the impression that a color wheel seems to close. For that one requires a spectrum of 50 precisely structured tones and half-tones that i developed for this work with the RAL Institute. This color sequence has now been patented; every color has its own number, a code, and all of them together are my little secret." (George Pusenkoff)
Inside the room one hears an endless loop of the music Voice of Mona Lisa. Pusenkoff composed it from archive material of Leonardo da Vinci. The spatial installation was not only exhibited in the Tretyakov Gallery, it was also shown at the 51st International Biennale in Venice in 2005. Since 2005, the tower has been located on the grounds of the Museum Ritter in Waldenbuch, Germany.

==== Mona Lisa goes Space ====
On 15 April 2005 – coincidentally the day of the birth date of Leonardo da Vinci – the Russian Soyuz spaceship TMA-6 launched from the spaceport Baikonur to the International Space Station (ISS). On board it had the painting by Pusenkoff Single Mona Lisa (1:1). It is the ultimate continuation of the project "Mona Lisa Travels" developed by Pusenkoff and could only be realized under difficult conditions. The authorities found the idea good in theory, but constantly put forward new reasons why the project was unrealizable. Only when Pusenkoff wrote to the then Italian ambassador in Russia, Gianfranco Facco Bonetti, the possibility of realizing the idea arose. The connection between science and art, which was also important in Leonardo da Vinci's life, found here an "actualization" in the form of this journey of an image of Mona Lisa into space. For the action, Pusenkoff's painting was removed from the frame so that it could be rolled. On board the spaceship, the painting was supervised by the Italian astronaut Roberto Vittori. On 25 April 2005, the Soyuz returned to Earth with the painting.

In addition to Pusenkoff's original painting "Single Mona Lisa (1:1)", an artificially created crystal also flew on this mission, on which an image of the painting was applied in nanotechnology: "The actual image of the Mona Lisa is found on a metal plate that measures approximately two by two millimeters and is suspended in a synthetic crystal. On this minute piece of metal there is a tiny point. Within this point, an area is defined that is approximately 1/100th of this point itself, and here there is a relief of the Mona Lisa. To produce this relief, the tip of a needle is electronically charged and with a computer–driven robot guided to the area on which the image should appear. Finally, the oxygen is withdrawn, and everywhere where the tip of the needle has touched the carrier material, it oxidizes. In this way, a relief is created that is built up of molecules."

It is not possible to see this image with the naked eye. Only through the use of a computer that scans signals is it possible to make the work of art visible. The crystal with the image of Mona Lisa painted by Pusenkoff is still on the International Space Station and orbits our planet several times a day.

== Collections (selection) ==
- Bolshoi Theatre -Museum, Moscow, Russia
- State Russian Museum, St. Petersburg, Russia
- State Tretjakov Gallery, Moscow, Russia
- Moscow Museum of Modern Art, Russia
- Institution of Engineering and Technology (IEE), Moscow, Russia
- ART4.RU Contemporary Art Museum, Moscow, Russia
- Stella Art Foundation, Moscow, Russia
- Collection Daimler-Benz, Stuttgart, Germany
- Museum Ludwig, Cologne, Germany
- Museum Ludwig, Koblenz, Germany
- Ludwig Forum für Internationale Kunst, Aachen, Germany
- Kunstmuseum Bochum, Germany
- Märkisches Museum Witten, Germany
- Jüdisches Museum Westfalen, Dorsten, Germany
- Ritter Museum, Waldenbuch, Germany
- Collection of the Federal Ministry of Labour, Berlin, Germany
- Collection of the Federal State of Hesse
- Hessian State Museum (Darmstadt), Germany
- Collection Solomon Oppenheim Bank, Cologne, Germany
- Museo La Biennale di Venezia, Venice, Italy
- Art Collection Rockefeller University, New York City, United Nations

== The Copyright-Violation-Process initiated by Helmut Newton (The Power of Blue) ==
In 1995 Pusenkoff was sued by the photographer Helmut Newton because he saw in a work of art by Pusenkoff "Power of Blue" a (unauthorized) derivative work of one of his photographs entitled "Miss Livingstone I, Beverly Hills, 1981". Newton argued that Pusenkoff's artwork resembled his work in its critical components so much that it was plagiarism. The Copyright law of Germany clearly regulates in §24 that an "independent" work created in "Fair use (in German "freie Benutzung") of another's work" may be exploited without the author's permission. Pusenkoff referred to this norm. The court now had to decide whether the picture "Power of Blue" was to be regarded as an adaptation or a "fair use". The black and white photography of Helmut Newton shows a female nude from the front, sitting on a folding chair. The background is white, right and left the surroundings can be seen in outlines. The woman sits with her legs widely spread on the chair, one leg bent so that her genitals are clearly visible, and radiates self-confidence. The woman's face is recognizable and at the edge of the photo a stylized, yet recognizable, environment is visible. Pusenkoff's work, on the other hand, is colored – in the typical deep blue tone quoted from Yves Klein. The nude itself is recognizable only as a silhouette. A yellow square covers the woman's shame and reaches up to her knee. The yellow square is to be understood as a reminiscence of Kasimir Malevich.

The Hanseatisches Oberlandesgericht decided in favor of Pusenkoff, since his processing had so alienated almost all core elements of Helmut Newton's photograph that there was hardly anything left that reminded one of Newton's work of art. The court went into detail about the differences in Newton's and Pusenkoff's works. The judges argued that Newton's metier is that of a photographer who primarily works with light. In contrast, Pusenkoff's profession is that of a painter, his field of work is the surface. While Newton is concerned with the objectified representation of eroticism, none of this is visible in George Pusenkoff's work. In his picture, the woman depicted in the nude can only be seen as a silhouette, the yellow square hides her naked shame, the color blue is clearly perceived as a reminiscence of Yves Klein. While Newton insisted that the special pose in which the woman can be seen in Pusenkoff's painting "Power of Blue" was identical to the one in his photograph, the court declared that merely the posture and pose of a photograph were not protected by copyright.

At the time, the process caused a lot of sensation, also internationally, not only because of the plaintiff Helmut Newton, but above all because it was one of the first processes on the subject of the appropriation and alienation of existing works of art, as they were used by postmodern artists, e.g. in Appropriation art.

== Exhibitions (selection) ==
=== Solo exhibitions ===
- 1991: Galerei Hans Mayer, Düsseldorf, Germany
- 1993: The Wall, Tretyakov Gallery, Moscow, Russia (This exhibition was also shown in the same year at the Galerie Hans Mayer in Düsseldorf)
- 1995: Ursula-Blickle-Stiftung, Kraital, Germany
- 1995: Russian Museum, St. Petersburg, Russia
- 1997: Simply Virtual, Mannheimer Kunstverein, Mannheim, Germany
- 1998: Simply Virtual, Museum Ludwig in the Russian Museum, St. Petersburg, Russia
- 2002: Erased Malevich, Felix Nussbaum Haus, Osnabrück, Germany
- 2002: George Pusenkoff: Painted and Erased, Märkisches Museum (Witten), Witten, Germany
- 2003: George Pusenkoff: Erased or Not Erased, Jüdisches Museum Westfalen, Dorsten, Germany
- 2004: Mona Lisa 500, Tretyakov Gallery, Moscow, Russia
- 2007: Mona Lisa und das schwarze Quadrat, Museum Ritter, Waldenbuch, Germany
- 2007: George Pusenkoff: Who is afraid, Moscow Museum of Modern Art (MMoMA), Moscow, Russia
- 2008: La Condition Humaine, Museum Bochum, Germany
- 2011: George Pusenkoff: Neo–Gau Malerei, Mannheimer Kunstverein, Germany
- 2013: Pusenkoff & Pusenkoff: After Reality, (Art project of corresponding works by George Pusenkoff and his son Ilya Pusenkoff) Ludwig Museum Koblenz, Koblenz, Germany (The exhibition was later shown at the Moscow Museum of Modern Art (MMoMA), Moscow, Russia

== Group exhibitions ==
- 1986: 17 th Exhibition of Young Artists, Moscow, Russia
- 1987: Rock–Art Parade ASSA, Culture House of the Moscow Electric Lamp Factory, Moscow, Russia
- 1987: Culture of Visual Art, Hermitage Amateur Society, Moscow, Profsojusnaja 100, Russia
- 1988: Labyrinth, Youth Palace, Moscow, Russia
- 1988: 18.th Exhibition of Young Artists, Moscow, Russia
- 1988: Gruppe 88, Armenian Embassy, Moscow, Russia
- 1994: Europa – Europa. Das Jahrhundert der Avantgarde in Mittel- und Osteuropa, Kunst- und Ausstellungshalle der Bundesrepublik Deutschland, Bonn, Germany
- 2002: Abstract Art in Russia, XX Century, Russian Museum, St. Petersburg, Russia
- 2002: Das Rote Haus, Städtische Galerie Villa Zanders, Bergisch Gladbach, Germany
- 2002: Kunst nach Kunst,Neues Museum Weserburg Bremen, Germany
- 2003: Das Recht des Bildes. Jüdische Perspektiven in der modernen Kunst, Museum Bochum, Germany
- 2003: Das Quadrat in der Kunst, Sammlung Marli Hoppe-Ritter, Museum Ettlingen, Germany
- 2003: New Countdown – Digital Russia, Guelman Gallery (together with Sony), Central House of Artists, Moscow, Russia
- 2004: Stella Art Gallery, Moscow, Russia
- 2004: Moskau – Berlin, State Historical Museum, Moscow, Russia
- 2005: Faces, Guelman Gallery, Central House of Artists, Moscow, Russia
- 2005: Russian Pop Art, Tretyakov Gallery, Moscow, Russia
- 2005: Mona Lisa goes Space, Biennale di Venezia, 51. International Art Exhibition, Italy
- 2005: Square, Museum Ritter, Waldenbuch, Germany
- 2005: Between Digital and Analog, Sacral and Profane, 1. Biennale of Contemporary Art, Moscow, Russia
- 2005: Mona Lisa goes Space, 51. International Art Exhibition, Biennale di Venezia, Italien
- 2005: Square, Museum Ritter, Waldenbuch, Deutschland
- 2007: I Believe, 2. Biennale of Contemporary Art, Moscow, Russia
- 2012: Decoration of the Beautiful. Elitism And Kitsch in Contemporary Art, Tretyakov Gallery, Moscow, Russia
- 2014: Post Pop: East Meets West, The Saatchi Gallery, London, England
- 2015: 6th International Biennale Peking: Memory and Dream, National Art Museum of China (NAMOC), Peking, China
- 2017: 7th International Biennale Peking: The Silk Road and World’s Civilizations, National Art Museum of China (NAMOC), Peking, China
- 2017: Wanderausstellung Aqua, Chateau de Penthes, Art for The World, Genf, Switzerland
- 2021: Kein Tag ohne Linie, Museum Ritter, Waldenbuch, Germany
