= Krasnapollye =

Krasnapollye Краснаполле (Belarusian) Краснополье (Russian)
- Urban-type settlement
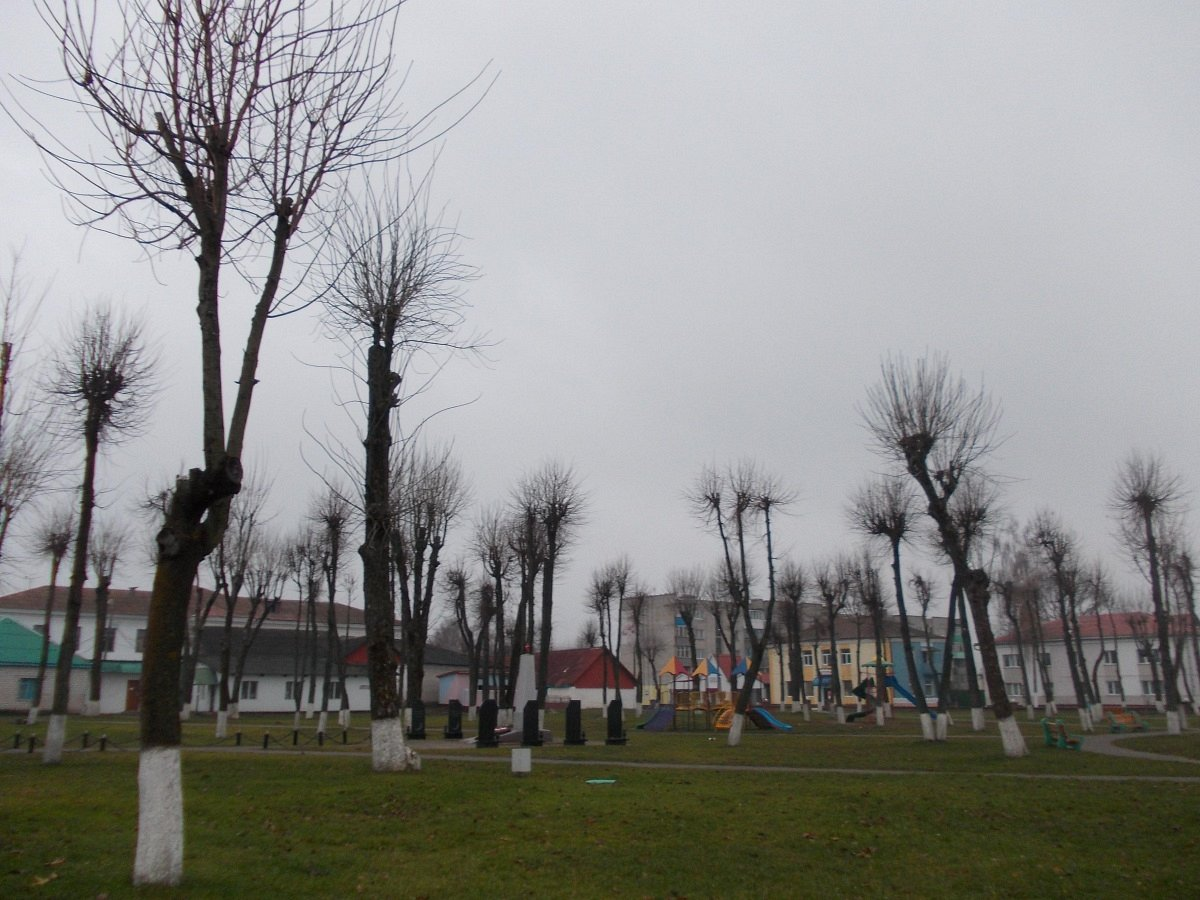

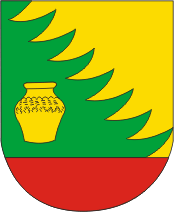
- Flag Coat of arms

- Location within Belarus
- Coordinates: 53°20′0″N 31°24′8″E
- Country: Belarus
- Region: Mogilev Region
- District: Krasnapollye District
- Population (2024): 5,618
- Time zone: UTC+3 (MSK)

Krasnapollye (Belarusian: Краснаполле, romanized: Krasnapollie; Russian: Краснополье, romanized: Krasnopolye) is an urban-type settlement in Mogilev Region, Belarus. It serves as the administrative center of Krasnapollye District. As of 2024, it has a population of 5,618.

== Geography ==
Krasnapollye is located 37 km (23 mi) south-west of Mogilev and 159 km (99 mi) east of Minsk.

== Notable people ==
- George Pusenkoff (born 1953), artist and photographer
