= Max Dudler =

Swiss architect

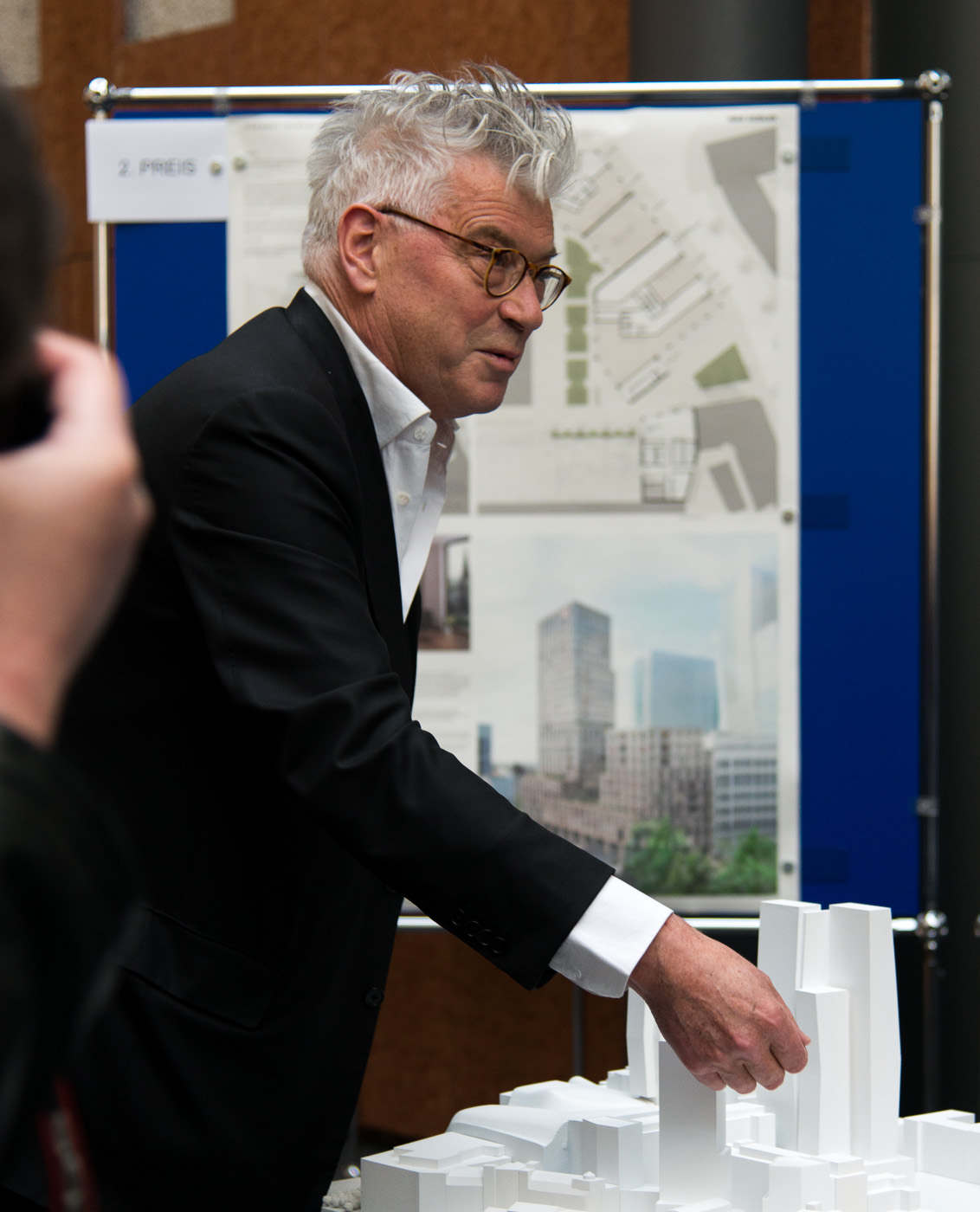
Dudler presenting one of his works in Frankfurt am Main (March 2013)

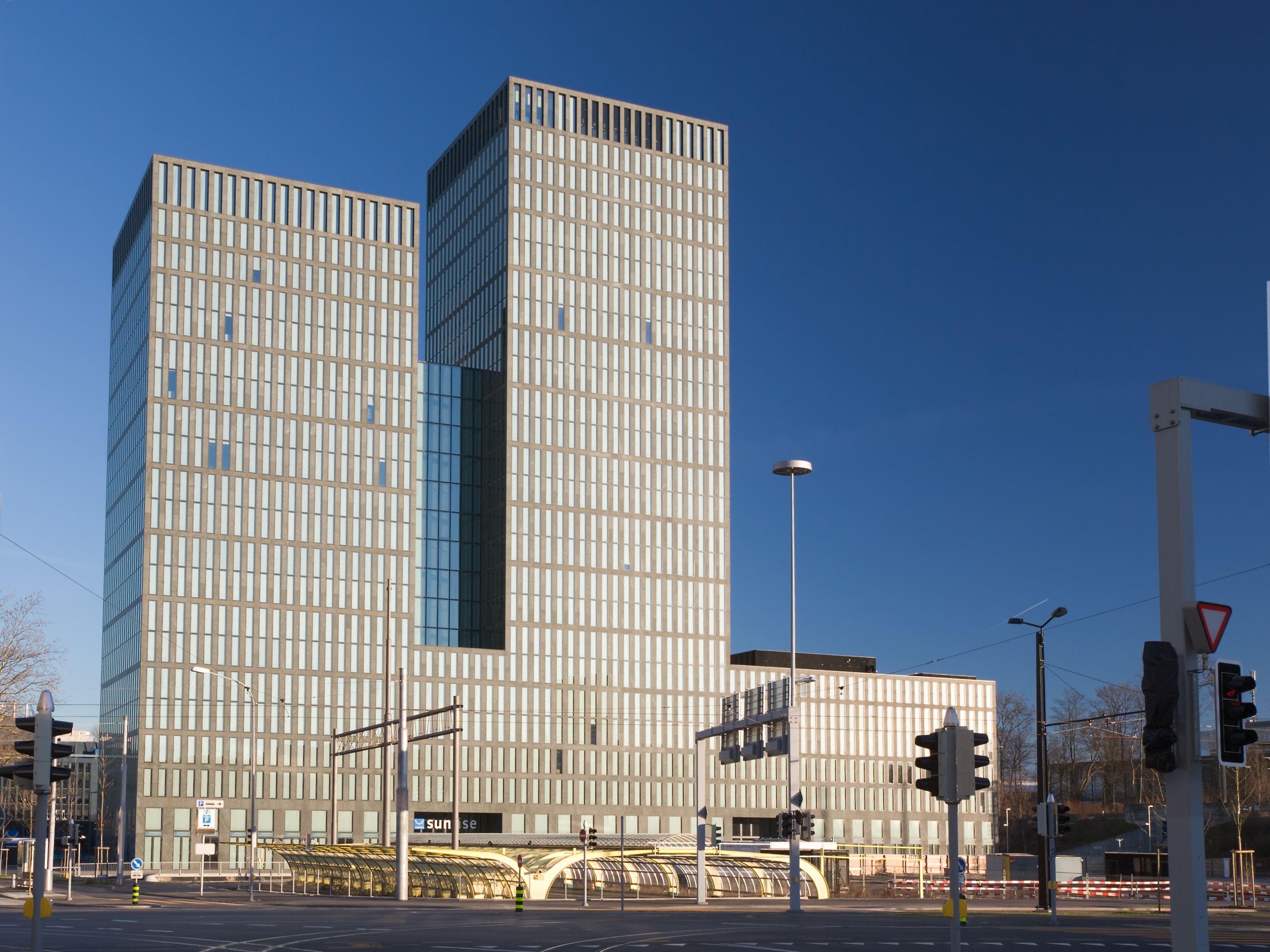
Sunrise Tower, Zürich

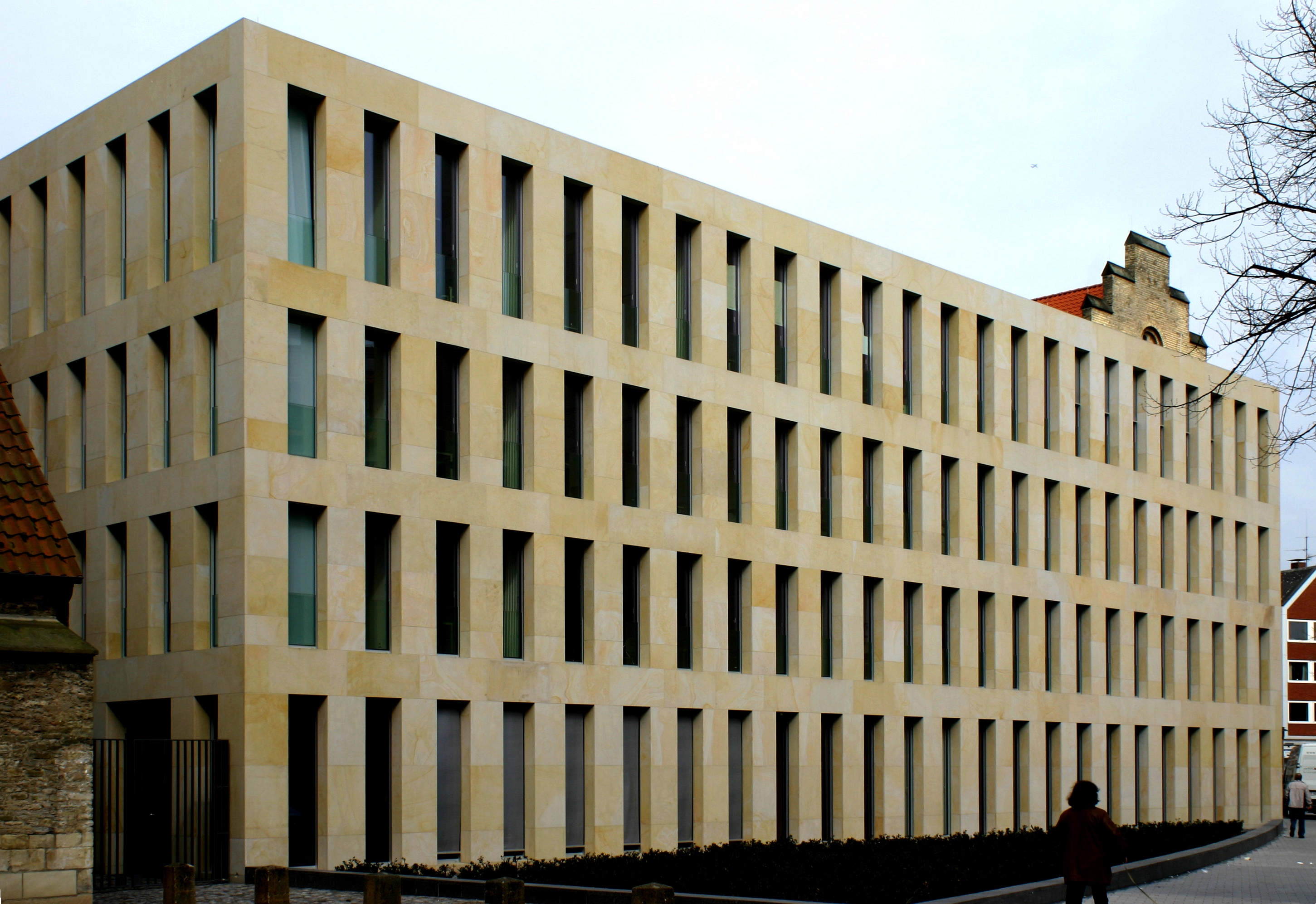
Dioezesan Library, Münster

Max Dudler (born 18 November 1949 in Altenrhein, Switzerland) is a Swiss architect with international fame. The main characteristic of Max Dudler's architecture is a combination of strict Swiss minimalism and classical rationalism that is found both in the historical and contemporary architecture.

== Education and career ==
Max Dudler studied at the Frankfurt Städelschule, a contemporary fine arts academy, where he was a student of Günter Bock, and later at the Academy of Arts in Berlin with Ludwig Leo. He obtained his diploma in 1979.

His first employment in 1981 brought him to O. M. Ungers, with whom and others he completed the exhibition hall 9 and the Galleria of Messe Frankfurt. In 1986, he established his own firm with Karl Dudler und Pete Welbergen, but since 1992, he started to run the firm with offices in Berlin, Frankfurt am Main and Zürich without a partner.

Dudler has held many teaching positions and had exhibitions both in Germany and Italy, for example, he was a faculty member at IUAV University of Venice 1989/1990. He was a lecturer at the summer academy of architecture in Herne (1989), Mantua (1990), Naples 1993 to 1995) and Vienna (1996). From 1996 to 1999 he was a visiting professor at the University of Dortmund. Since 2004 he has been a professor for architecture at the prestigious Kunstakademie Düsseldorf together with Axel Schultes and Laurids Ortner.

== Selected projects ==
- 1986–1989: BEWAG Substation, Berlin
- 1997–2004: Federal Ministry for Digital and Transport (Building extensions), Berlin
- 1999–2000: Neue Deutsche Börse, Frankfurt
- 2005: Ritter Museum for Alfred Ritter GmbH & Co. KG, Waldenbuch near Stuttgart
- 2002–2005: Dioezesan Library, Münster
- 2003–2009: Skyscrapers Ensemble on Ulmenstraße, Frankfurt
- 2008–2012: Stadthalle, Reutlingen
- 2009: Jacob and Wilhelm Grimm Centre at Humboldt University of Berlin
- 2005–2018: Hambach Castle, Neustadt an der Weinstraße
- 2011 Sunrise Tower, Zürich
- 2011: Visitor Centre, Heidelberg Castle
- 2014: Visitor Centre, Sparrenburg Castle, Bielefeld
- 2020 Museumsinsel (Berlin U-Bahn) station

== Publications ==
- Dudler, Max; Ridler, Gerda; Dudler, Max; Museum Ritter (2010). Museum Ritter: dem Quadrat ein Museum – a museum squared with art; Architekt Max Dudler. Sulgen: Niggli. ISBN 978-3-7212-0571-8.
- Dudler, Max (2010). IBM Schweiz (in German). Sulgen: Niggli. ISBN 978-3-7212-0573-2.
- Dudler, Max; Bürkle, J. Christoph (2003). Architecture for the city. Sulgen: Niggli. ISBN 978-3-7212-0451-3.
- Dudler, Max (1998). Bauplan (in German). Gebrüder Mann Verlag. ISBN 978-3-7861-1818-3.
- Kieren, Martin (1996). Max Dudler (in German). Berlin: Gebr. Mann Verl. ISBN 978-3-7861-1797-1.
