= Handball Federation of Belarus =

Sports governing body in Belarus

Handball Federation of Belarus Belarusian: Беларуская Фэдэрацыя гандбола, Belaruszkaja federacija handbola BFH
- IOC nation: Belarus
- Sport: Handball
- Other sports: Beach Handball; Wheelchair Handball
- Official website: handball.by

HISTORY
- Year of formation: 1992; 34 years ago

AFFILIATIONS
- International federation: International Handball Federation (IHF)
- IHF member since: 1992
- Continental association: European Handball Federation
- National Olympic Committee: Belarus Olympic Committee

GOVERNING BODY
- President: Vladimir Konoplev

HEADQUARTERS
- Address: Surganova str. 2-213 220 012 Minsk
- Country: Belarus
- Secretary General: Kudreika Siarhei

Belarus Handball Federation (Belarusian: Беларуская Фэдэрацыя гандбола, Belaruszkaja federacija handbola, BFH) is a national governing body of handball in Belarus.

In reaction to the launch of the 2022 Russian invasion of Ukraine, the European Handball Federation in February 2022 indefinitely suspended Belarusian national and club teams from competitions. The International Handball Federation banned Belarus athletes and officials. Referees, officials, and commission members from Belarus will not be called upon for future activities.

== See also ==
- Belarus men's national handball team
- Belarus women's national handball team
