= Sunrise Tower (Zurich) =

Skyscraper in Zürich, Switzerland

- Sonnenaufgangsturm (German)
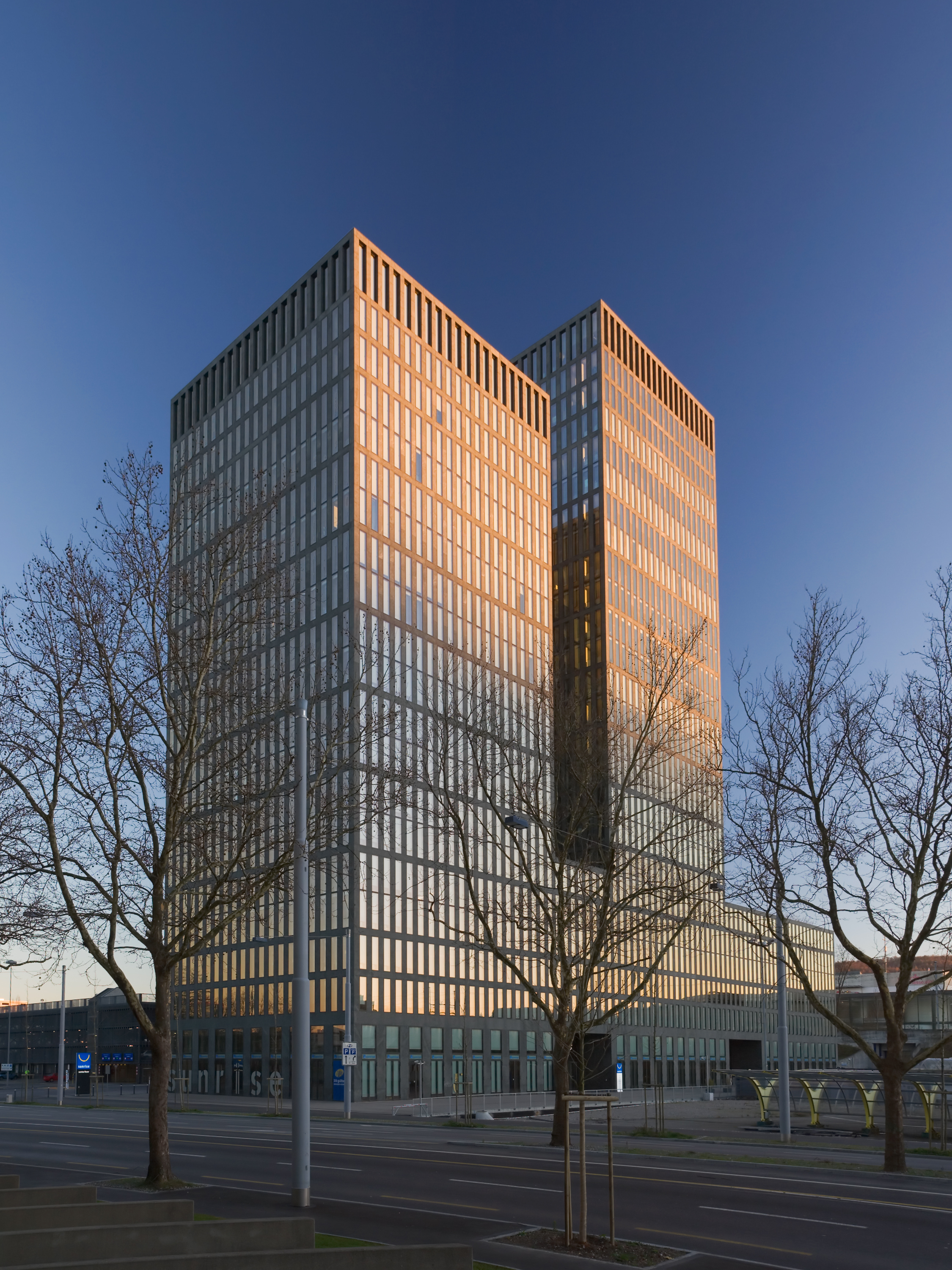
- Interactive map of the Sunrise Tower area

General information
- Status: Completed
- Type: Office
- Location: Zürich, Switzerland, 20-22 Hagenholzstrasse, Zürich, Switzerland
- Coordinates: 47.41376°N 8.55265°E
- Construction started: 2000
- Completed: 2004
- Cost: € 212 Million
- Client: Credit Suisse (former)
- Owner: Zürich Pension Fund (BVK)

Height
- Roof: 90 m (300 ft) and 72.5 m (238 ft)

Technical details
- Structural system: Reinforced concrete
- Floor count: 26
- Floor area: 215,000 m^{2} (2,310,000 sq ft)

Design and construction
- Architect: Architektengemeinschaft Atelier WW (Max Dudler)

The Sunrise Tower (German: Sonnenaufgangsturm) also known as Hochhaus Hagenholzstrasse is a high-rise office building in Zürich, Switzerland. Built between 2000 and 2004, the composition consists of two cojoined towers standing at 90 m (300 ft) respectively 72.5 m (238 ft), with the taller half being divided into 26 floors. They share the position of the 15th tallest buildings in Switzerland.

== History ==
=== Architecture ===
The construction of the Sunrise Tower marked the end of an era in Zürich without high-rise buildings as the city council had not approved any type of these edifices for twenty years. On August 25, 2005, government councilor Hans Hollenstein gave the approval for the complex to the then Sunrise CEO Hans Peter Baumgartner.

Construction work on the tower's site began in 2000 and was completed in 2005. It was the result of a design created by the Wäschle Wüst consortium and architect Max Dudler's studio that won the architectural competition. The building was also known as the diAx Tower at the time, as it was promoted by the former mobile phone provider diAx which was its main tenant. Tele Denmark merged Sunrise Communications and diAx to form TDC Switzerland or Sunrise Communications Group AG and took over the construction project, which was then named the Sunrise Tower in line with CI. The building's developer and owner, however, is the Civil Servants' Insurance Fund of the Canton of Zurich (BVK). The company had the building constructed by the general contractor Zschokke for around 200 million francs (€ 212 Million).

The building complex corresponds to the first construction phase of the overall development, which was set to demolish four old buildings from the site before the construction was event planned to start. The four office buildings of the complex were grouped around the Quadroplatz Square in order to form one of the most transited areas in the Leutschenbach River area. In addition to the Sunrise Tower, the slightly lower MainTower (with 16 floors) was also set to be part of the overall development once construction was completed.

The facade area measures a 18,000 m^{2} (194,000 sq ft). The total usable gross area of the building (215,000 m^{2} (2,310,000 sq ft) according to building standard 116 of Swiss Society of Engineers and Architects (SIA)) is furnished in a modern Scandinavian style. The furniture in the canteens and lounges was designed by the Danish designer Arne Jacobsen. The complex architect Max Dudler chose the same materials and proportions for the windows as in the Münster Diocesan Library, project in which he was also involved.

=== Tenancy ===
TDC began moving its various locations around Zürich into the towers in May 2005. The floors were occupied from top to bottom and the move was completed by September 2005. Around 2,000 people currently work in the complex, with potential for 2,200 jobs. Between 2009 and 2024, large parts of the tower have been used by Credit Suisse IT employees.

On November 11, 2009, the Swiss Ueli Gegenschatz sustained serious injuries during a base jump from the Sunrise Tower as part of a promotional campaign, from which he succumbed two days later.

At the beginning of February 2010, the entire TDC Switzerland moved out of the building, which is now mostly rented by Credit Suisse and has been re-signed accordingly. On March 10, 2024, it was announced that Credit Suisse were going to terminate the lease effective on July 31.

== See also ==
- List of tallest buildings in Switzerland
