= Vladimir Konoplev =

Belarusian politician and sports official (born 1954)

Vladimir Nikolayevich Konoplev
- Уладзімір Мікалаевіч Канаплёў; Влади́мир Никола́евич Коноплёв
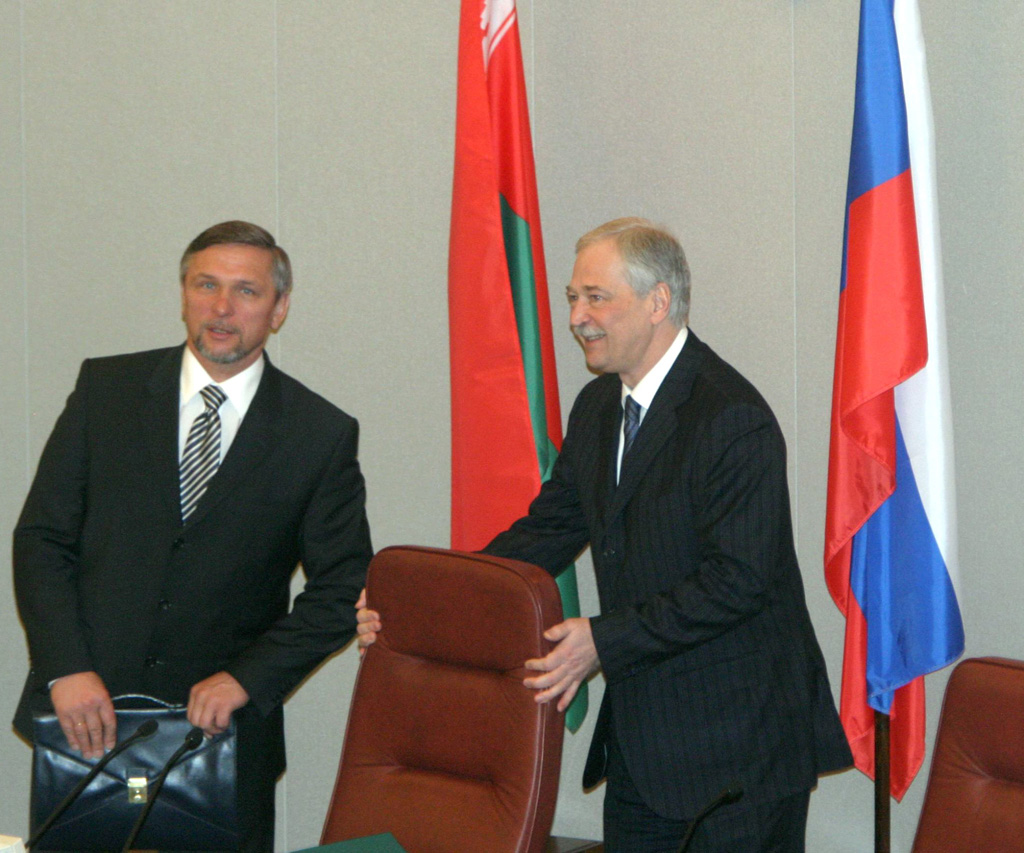
- Konoplev at a parliamentary assembly session in 2006 (on left side).

Speaker of the House of Representatives
- In office 16 November 2004 – 2 October 2007
- President: Alexander Lukashenko
- Prime Minister: Sergei Sidorsky
- Preceded by: Vadim Popov
- Succeeded by: Vadim Popov

Deputy of the Supreme Council of Belarus in the XIII convocation
- In office 28 May 1995 – 27 November 1996

Personal details
- Born: January 3, 1954 Akulincy, Mogilev district, Byelorussian SSR, Soviet Union
- Education: Mogilev State A. Kuleshov University
- Occupation: Teacher; Politician

Vladimir Nikolayevich Konoplev (Belarusian: Уладзімір Мікалаевіч Канаплёў; born 3 January 1954) is a Belarusian politician and sports official. He served as Speaker of the House of Representatives from 2004 to 2007. He is also known for his longstanding association with Belarusian President Alexander Lukashenko.

Born in Akulincy (Mogilev District) in the Byelorussian SSR, he graduated from the Mogilev State A. Kuleshov University in 1975, where he became friends with Alexander Lukashenko. Afterward, he served as a teacher in Skhlov, and was then a director and later an inspector of schools, also in Skhlov. In 1991, he quit teaching and became an assistant to then deputy of the Supreme Council of Belarus, Alexander Lukashenko, and in 1994 was heavily involved in collecting signatures for Lukashenko's presidential campaign, which led to Lukashenko winning the 1994 Belarusian presidential election. He was afterward promoted to main assistant to Lukashenko before becoming a deputy himself in the XIII convocation, where he led the pro-Lukashenko parliamentary fraction Згода (Zgoda), which helped avoid Lukashenko's impeachment charges in 1996. He afterwards became Deputy Chairman of the now House of Representatives in the first convocation, and was reelected in 2000 as a deputy from Skhlov constituency No. 75. In November 2004 he became Chairman, and during his tenure was known for advocating for closer Belarusian-Russian relations and for being against the Western world. In September 2007, he announced his resignation from the post. After having initially been elected in June 2006 as Chairman of the Handball Federation of Belarus, he continued with that job, being continuously reelected since then.

== Early life ==
Konoplev was born on 3 January 1954 in Akulincy, which was then part of the Mogilev district in the Byelorussian SSR at the time of his birth. His father, Nikolai Evdokimovich, worked in the telecommunication industry and his mother, Klavdiya Ilyinichna, worked as a nurse in the local hospital in Sukhari for more than 50 years. After graduating from Sukharevskaya secondary school, in 1975 he graduated from Mogilev State A. Kuleshov University with a degree in geography. While studying there, he also played in the volleyball department under his mentor Igor Ryabchenko, where he met Alexander Lukashenko as he played handball at the school and they became good friends. After graduating, he completed his mandatory military service in the Soviet Army. Afterward, he served as a teacher at a boarding school, the Shklov Specialized School for Blind and Visually Impaired Children, from 1975 to 1976 and was then Deputy Director at Secondary School No. 3, which was also in Skhlov from 1977 to 1983. From 1983 to 1991 he then served as the inspector of juvenile affairs of the Department of Internal Affairs of the Skhlov District Executive Committee.

== Political career ==
=== Early political career (1991-2003) ===
From 1991 to 1994, he served as an assistant to Alexander Lukashenko, then a Deputy of the Supreme Council of Belarus. The two had been friends since their university days in Mogilev. In 1994, as an assistant, he and his wife Alla were heavily involved in collecting signatures for Lukashenko in the 1994 Belarusian presidential election, garnering about half or 70,000 signatures for him. With Lukashenko's victory in the election, Konoplev was promoted to a main assistant and in 1995 he himself was elected as a Deputy of the Supreme Council of Belarus in the XIII convocation. In the council, he led the pro-Lukashenko parliamentary fraction Згода (Zgoda), and was also a member of the Presidium of the Supreme Council of Belarus. In 1996, he played a key role in keeping Lukashenko from impeachment, encouraging his faction to help Lukashenko after impeachment charges were brought against him for violating the Constitution of Belarus by expanding presidential powers.

After helping Lukashenko stay in power, in an extraordinary session of the now parliamentary lower house, the House of Representatives elected him as Deputy Chairman of the House of Representatives of the first convocation. He was reelected as Deputy Chairman for the second convocation in 2000, and was elected as deputy again this time from Shklov constituency No. 75.

=== Speaker of the House of Representatives (2004-2007) ===
On 16 November 2004 he was elected Chairman of the House of Representatives, with 103 votes for and 5 votes against of the 108 deputies who participated. One of his first actions was on 22 November meeting with then Secretary General of the Energy Charter Treaty, Ria Kemper, to discuss further cooperation and ratification of the treaty and supporting European initiatives. During his time as speaker, he advocated for closer Belarusian-Russian relations and advocated for the integration process. He expressed skepticism about Belarus’s relationship with Western countries, stating that the West's friendship was only on paper. He was against sanctions and visa restrictions on Belarus, stating it was the choice of the Belarusian people and that it was a "double standard" of prejudice. Konoplev stated that the EU and Belarus would only cooperate together if there was mutual interest. During the 2006 Belarusian presidential election, he stated the opposition candidate Alaksandar Milinkievič was chosen by overseas forces and stated he was unknown in Belarus.

On 11 September 2007, he announced that he was resigning from the post of speaker, which he stated was due to poor health and that he was receiving treatment in Sochi. However, some disputed this, saying he had left the country in haste and moved to Moscow to avoid a possible arrest. Kommersant stated that he had come to the attention of the Belarusian KGB due to his close contact with the Russian president, Vladimir Putin, and that he was attempting to take over Lukashenko's position which Siarhei Skrabets also corrobrated. On 2 October 2007 he officially resigned from the post and was succeeded by Vadim Popov.

== Sports career ==
In June 2006 Konoplev became Chairman of the Handball Federation of Belarus, replacing Yuri Kulakovsky. In September 2019 he advocated for a joint bid of Belarus, Poland, and Lithuania to host the 2026 European Men's Handball Championship. The federations of the countries expressed a joint intention to host in October 2020, but as the countries' relations deteriorated their official bid was not announced in March 2021.

Since the Russian invasion of Ukraine and the suspension of Belarus from international tournaments, he has actively campaigned to return the teams to international tournaments, although so far they have only played in an Iranian championship following a memorandum of understanding and some friendlies with Russia. He was accused of violating human rights by pressuring athletes and employees to stay silent on political issues by the Ukrainian government, and eliminating the club "Vityaz" from the Belarusian Handball Championship due to politics. In March 2025 the Iranian Handball Federation and Belarusian one signed a memorandum of understanding, which furthered interactions between the two federations. On 14 May 2025 he was elected again as head for his 5th term after all candidates voted for him.

== Personal life ==
He is married to a woman named Alla. She was the Head of the Special Education Department of the Ministry of Education of Belarus until September 2007. As of 2009, he lives in Drazdy, the village where most people associated with Lukashenko live on alley Ozerny. He has a son named Nikolai, who studied at the Faculty of International Relations of the Belarusian State University then Peking University. He managed various companies before moving to China in 1997 and working at the Olympic Consul of Belarus to China.

== Legal issues ==
On 27 November 2013 Konoplev was detained by the KGB while the police were conducting a check on associates of Gennady Alekseenko, the vice-president of the NOC of Belarus, but stated there was no criminal case at the time against him. From 18 to 21 November 2013 he was in custody at a KGB pre-trial detention center. It was announced soon after that a criminal case was opened against the former Deputy Prosecutor General of Belarus, Alexander Arkhipov, after he terminated a criminal case against the son of a businessman who killed a 24-year-old girl in exchange for a bar of gold and cognac. On 20 May the Supreme Court of Belarus began to consider the case. In June 2014 he pleaded guilty for failure to report a crime under Part 1 of Article 406, and was fined 135 million rubles.

== Honours and awards ==
- Order of the Cross of Saint Euphrosyne (Belarusian Orthodox Church)
- Order of the Abbess of Polotsk (Belarusian Orthodox Church)
- Order of Holy Prince Daniel of Moscow (Russian Orthodox Church)
- Order of the Fatherland III Degree (2004; Belarus)
- Order of the Commonwealth (10 February 2006; CIS)
- Medal of IPA CIS 25 Years (27 March 2017; CIS Interparliamentary Assembly)

Political offices
Preceded by Vadim Popov	Speaker of the House of Representatives of Belarus; 2004-2007	Succeeded by Vadim Popov
