= Krasnapollye district =

District of Mogilev region, Belarus

Coordinates: 53°20′00″N 31°24′08″E

Krasnapollye district Краснапольскі раён (Belarusian) Краснопольский район (Russian)
- District
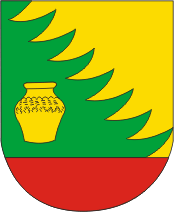
- Flag Coat of arms

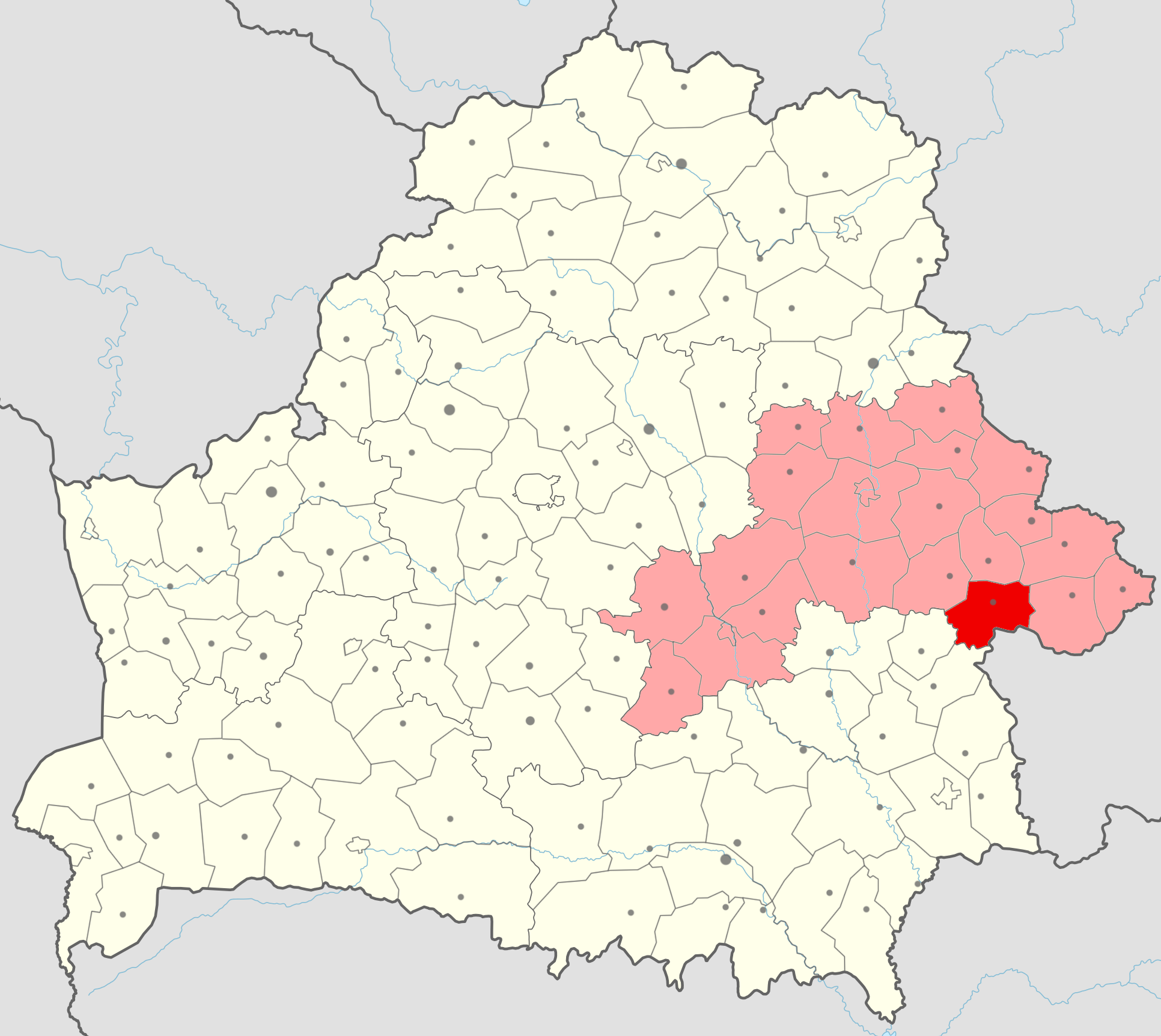
- Country: Belarus
- Region: Mogilev region
- Administrative center: Krasnapollye

Area
  - Total: 1,223.04 km^{2} (472.22 sq mi)

Population (2023)
  - Total: 8,942
  - Density: 7.311/km^{2} (18.94/sq mi)
- Time zone: UTC+3 (MSK)

Krasnapollye district or Krasnapollie district (Belarusian: Краснапольскі раён; Russian: Краснопольский район, romanized: Krasnopolsky rayon) is a district (raion) of Mogilev region in Belarus. The administrative center is the urban-type settlement of Krasnapollye. As of 2009, its population was 11,176. The population of Krasnapollye accounts for 54.8% of the district's population.

== History ==
As a result of the Chernobyl disaster, part of the district's territory was contaminated, and the inhabitants were resettled. In the area, 83 settlements remained uninhabited, and more than 9,000 people lost their homes.

== Notable residents ==
- Viera Cierliukievič (1941 – 2000), political and trade union activist
- Andrej Mryj (1893 – 1943), satirical writer, journalist, translator and a victim of Stalin's purges.
