= Republic of Belarus (1991–1995) =

Short-lived democratic period of the post-Soviet Belarus from 1991 to 1995

Republic of Belarus Рэспубліка Беларусь (Belarusian) Respublika Biełaruś
- 1991–1994
- Flag Coat of arms
- Anthem: Дзяржаўны гімн Рэспублікі Беларусь; Dziaržaŭny himn Respubliki Biełaruś (English: "State Anthem of the Republic of Belarus")
- Location of Republic of Belarus (1991–1995) (green) in Europe (dark grey) – [Legend]
- Capital and largest city: Minsk; 53°55′N 27°33′E
- Official languages: Belarusian
- Ethnic groups (1989 census): 77.9% Belarusians; 13.2% Russians; 4.1% Poles; 2.9% Ukrainians; 1.1% Jews; 0.83 other
- Demonym: Belarusian
- Government: Unitary parliamentary republic (1991–1994); Unitary semi-presidential republic (1994–1995)
- Chairman of the Supreme Council/President
  - 1991–1994 (first): Stanislav Shushkevich
  - 1994: Vyachaslaw Kuznyatsow (acting)
  - 1994: Myechyslaw Hryb
  - 1994–1995 (last): Alexander Lukashenko
- Prime Minister
  - 1991–1994 (first): Vyacheslav Kebich
  - 1994–1995 (last): Mikhail Chyhir
- Legislature: Supreme Council
- History
  - Independence declared: 25 August 1991
  - Renamed to the Republic of Belarus: 19 September 1991
  - Belovezha Accords ratified: 10 December 1991
  - Internationally recognized: 26 December 1991
  - Current constitution: 15 March 1994
  - First presidential election: 23 June – 10 July 1994
  - First parliamentary election and referendum: 14 May 1995

Area
  - Total: 207,595 km^{2} (80,153 sq mi)

Population
  - 1993 estimate: 10,239,050
  - Density: 49.3/km^{2} (127.7/sq mi)
- GDP (PPP): 1993 estimate
  - Total: $47.52 billion
  - Per capita: $4,640.9
- GDP (nominal): 1993 estimate
  - Total: $16.28 billion
  - Per capita: $1,589.5
- Currency: Belarusian ruble (BYB)
- Time zone: UTC+2 (EET)
  - Summer (DST): UTC+3 (EEST)
- Calling code: +7 015/016/017/02
- ISO 3166 code: BY
Preceded by	Succeeded by
Byelorussian Soviet Socialist Republic	Republic of Belarus
- Today part of: Belarus

Between 1991 and 1994, the Republic of Belarus had no official constitution separated from the Soviet system, as it largely relied on government structures inherited from the Byelorussian Soviet Socialist Republic. The time period also was one of political tension between the former CPB members and reformists, mostly aligned with the Belarusian Popular Front. The first constitution would be adopted in 1994.

== History ==
During the August Coup in 1991, the Byelorussian Soviet Socialist Republic's branch of the Communist Party of the Soviet Union supported the putsch. However, once the coup failed, Chairman of the Supreme Council Nikolai Dementey (who was also first secretary of the Communist Party of Byelorussia) was forced to resign from his post, leading to the election of Stanislav Shushkevich, a scientist, who while a member of the CPSU, was not directly tied to the Apparats. Alongside this, he was known previously for his criticism of the Soviet government's disregard for the Chernobyl Disaster.

On 25 August 1991, the BSSR declared independence from the Soviet Union, becoming the Republic of Belarus. the White-red-white flag was re-adopted, alongside the Pahonia. The CPB was banned, alongside the larger Communist Party of the Soviet Union.

In 1994, the Constitution of Belarus was adopted, which brought this period to an end.

=== Chernobyl disaster ===
The Chernobyl disaster remained a top issue in Belarusian politics throughout the 1990s. In 1991, the Belarusian state had to craft policy to handle the disaster on their own after the Soviet Union's collapse, and by extension, research institutions to inform said policy. By the late 1990s, Chernobyl had faded out of public consciousness, and thus political discussion in the country.

== Politics ==
Due to many of the political structures of Belarus being inherited from the Soviet era, minus those of the communist party, Belarus between 1991 and 1994 functioned as a parliamentary republic with the chairman of the Supreme Council as the acting head of state. This position was held by social-democrat Stanislav Shushkevich at first, but was later taken up by Myechyslaw Hryb, a pro-Russian conservative aligned with the Supreme Council. Meanwhile, the Prime Minister, appointed under Soviet rule, was the official head of government.

In early 1992, the Belarusian Popular Front petitioned the government for early elections, but the Supreme Council rejected the petition, claiming massive irregularities, despite showcasing no evidence for such. As a concession to the opposition, parliamentary elections were set for March 1994. However, electoral reform failed to pass led to an ambiguous state for elections. Concerns stated by other countries, including the United States over continued delays in new elections were dismissed by the conservative majority in the Supreme Council as "interference in Belarusian affairs." Elections to the legislature were not held until 1995, by which point a dictatorship under Alexander Lukashenko was rapidly consolidating power.

== Economy ==
Contrary to conditions in the other post-Soviet states, the Belarusian industrial sector initially had less severe decline, mostly due to the government's reluctance to adopt Shock therapy. Belarus also assumed 4.13% of the Soviet Union's debt, which it would later transfer to Russia in exchange for Soviet assets.

== Foreign relations ==
During the early 1990s, Belarus had a very contradictory foreign policy, due to the various conflicts between the branches of government. The Foreign Minister at the time, Petr Krauchanka, advanced claims on neighboring Lithuania with a nationalist outlook, while Stanislav Shushkevich rejected such claims, and attempted to guarantee the current borders of the country. The Polish-Belarusian state declaration, signed in October 1991, ended Belarusian claims on Polish territory, and calmed fears amongst the small nationalist movement of Polish irredentism. The country also experienced friendly relations with the West, which culminated with American President Bill Clinton's visit to Minsk on 15 January 1994.

== Demographics ==
Population of Belarus according to ethnic groups in 1989
Ethnic group	census 1989^{4}	
Ethnic group	Number	%
Belarusians	7,904,623	77.9
Russians	1,342,099	13.2
Poles	417,720	4.1
Ukrainians	291,008	2.9
Jews	111,975	1.1
Armenians	4,933	0.1
Tatars	12,436	0.1
Romani	10,762	0.1
Azerbaijanis	5,009	0.1
Lithuanians	7,606	0.1
Others	43,635	0.4
Total	10,151,806	

Eastern Orthodox Christianity was (and still is) the main religion in Belarus. In the early 1990s, 60% of Belarus identified with Orthodoxy. Catholicism sat at about 8 to 20% of the population in the early 90s, with an estimate that 25% of them were ethnic Poles. This figure also includes the Belarusian Greek Catholic Church. In 1990, there were about 350 Protestant communities.

== Human rights ==
Belarus was classified as "Partly Free" by Freedom House in their 1992–1993 report, with criticisms including the continued state ownership of media outlets and political conflicts obstructing reform.
