= President of Belarus =

Head of state and government

President of the Republic of Belarus
- Прэзідэнт Рэспублікі Беларусь (Belarusian); Президент Республики Беларусь (Russian)
- Presidential standard

- Incumbent; Alexander Lukashenko since 20 July 1994 (Note: Some countries, especially Western nations, do not recognize Lukashenko as the legitimate president of Belarus since the 2020 Belarusian presidential election. However, he continues to have de facto control over Belarus, being supported by Russia and China and by suppressing internal opposition.)
- Presidential Administration of Belarus
- Style: Mr President (informal); His Excellency (diplomatic)
- Status: Head of state; Commander-in-chief
- Residence: Independence Palace, Minsk (ceremonial); Presidential Residence, Minsk (residential)
- Appointer: Popular vote
- Term length: Five years, renewable once
- Constituting instrument: Constitution of Belarus (1994)
- Precursor: Chairman of the Supreme Council
- Formation: 20 July 1994; 32 years ago
- First holder: Alexander Lukashenko
- Deputy: Speaker of the Council of the Republic
- Salary: ~84,000 Belarusian rubles/US$33,600, annually
- Website: Official website

The president of the Republic of Belarus (Note: Belarusian: Прэзідэнт Рэспублікі Беларусь, romanized: Prezident Respubliki Biełaruś; Russian: Президент Республики Беларусь, romanized: Prezident Respubliki Belarus') is the head of state of Belarus. The office was created in 1994 with the passing of the Constitution of Belarus by the Supreme Council. This replaced the office of Chairman of the Supreme Council as the head of state. The tasks of the president include executing foreign and domestic policy, defending the rights and general welfare of citizens and residents, and upholding the Constitution. The president is mandated by the Constitution to serve as a leader in the social affairs of the country and to act as its main representative abroad. The duties, responsibilities and other transitional clauses dealing with the presidency are listed in Chapter Three, Articles 79 through 89, of the Constitution.

The term for the president is five years, but due to a 1996 referendum, the election that was supposed to occur in 1999 was pushed back to 2001. Under the 1994 constitution, the president of Belarus could only serve for two terms, but due to a change in the constitution, term limits were eliminated. In the 2022 constitutional referendum, a limit of two terms was reimposed, though only on "newly elected presidents". During the course of the office, elections were held in 1994, 2001, 2006, 2010, 2015, 2020 and 2025. Alexander Lukashenko is currently the only person to have been president of Belarus since the position was established in 1994. The presidential office is located in the Palace of the Republic in the capital Minsk, while the presidential residence is located in Zaslawye, near the capital.

Lukashenko heads an authoritarian government and has often been referred to as "Europe's last dictator". Elections are not considered to be free and fair by international monitors, opponents of the regime are repressed, and the media is not free.

== Historical background ==
Belarus first declared independence in early 1918 as the Belarusian Democratic Republic. Its head of state was the president of a provisional supreme governing body, the Rada of the Belarusian Democratic Republic. In 1919, the Soviet Red Army forced the Rada of the Belarusian Democratic Republic into exile where the Rada still exists, now led by President Ivonka Survilla. Under Soviet rule, the de facto leader of the Byelorussian SSR was the first secretary of the Communist Party of Byelorussia, the only legal party in Soviet Belarus.

The Republic of Belarus was formed in 1991 shortly after declaring itself independent of the Soviet Union. From independence until passage of the Constitution in 1994, the chairman of the Supreme Soviet was the head of state and the prime minister as the head of government. When the office of the presidency was created, the role of the prime minister was reduced to assisting the president and resulted in the dissolution of the Supreme Soviet, along with its chairman, in 1996.

In the first set of elections for the office of president, the prime minister of Belarus, Vyacheslav Kebich, was defeated in a runoff vote by Alexander Lukashenko, resulting in Lukashenko becoming the first president. In elections of 2001 and 2006, which were contested by international observers, Western powers and internal opposition parties due for failing to meet democratic and fair standards, the incumbent Lukashenko defeated the other candidates within the first ballot. As of 2026, he is the only person to have served as President of Belarus.

== Constitutional status ==
Article 79 of the Constitution of Belarus gives the status of head of state to the president of the Republic of Belarus. They are also considered the guardian of the Constitution and the rights and freedoms of those who claim Belarusian citizenship or residency. The president is the personification of unification of the Belarusian state when conducting foreign or internal affairs and shall be the main representative when dealing with other nations or international organizations. The president is also entrusted with the safety, prosperity and stability of the country and acts as an intermediary between the bodies of the national government.

During their tenure in office, the president is barred from formal membership in a political party.

== Selection process ==
=== Eligibility ===
In order to be able to run for office, a candidate must be a Belarusian citizen by birth that is over thirty-five years old. The candidate must also reside within the republic for ten years and able to cast a ballot legally. The provisions are set down in Article 80 of the Constitution.

=== Nomination and election ===
Elections for president occur every five years by a national vote. To be registered as a candidate for the presidency the prospective candidate is first required to have an initiative group of citizens containing no fewer than 100 persons. The initiative group must be registered with the Central Elections Commission no later than 85 days before the election. If successfully registered, the nominated candidate is tasked with collecting at least 100,000 valid signatures from eligible voters. If the Central Elections Commissions find that this threshold has been reached, the candidate is officially certified to run for the presidency.

In the voting, the secret ballots are collected directly from eligible voters. The election is valid only if more than 50 % of registered voters cast a ballot. During the first round of voting, if a candidate earns fifty percent plus one of the votes, they are declared the President-elect. If no one has achieved that number during the first round, then a run-off election will occur between two candidates who won the most votes. The person who wins the most votes in the run-off is declared the president-elect.

In the event the office is vacant, the election to replace the president must occur between thirty and seventy days after the vacancy occurred. During normal election cycles, the elections must occur before the last two months of the current president. In either situation, the government body that calls for elections is the House of Representatives. The last round of presidential elections occurred in 2025. President Lukashenko, when addressing the press in February 2007, stated his health will determine if he will run in 2011 or step down at that time.

== Powers and duties ==
Articles 84 and 85 states the official political, social and national defense duties that are rested with the president. Other than the enumerated powers, Number 30 allows the president to use other powers granted to them either from national law or from other sections of the Constitution.

Part of the prerogative of the president is the right to call referendums, and to call regular and extraordinary elections to the House of Representatives, the Council of the Republic and local representative bodies. They can also dissolve both chambers of the Parliament, as the Constitution permits. It is their duty to appoint the prime minister of the Republic of Belarus, and to decide the structure of the Government of the Republic of Belarus. The president signs bills, and has the right to veto and return it, fully or in parts, with objections to the House of Representatives. They also appoint – and can dismiss – the deputy Prime ministers, the ministers and the other members of the Government, and they decide in cases of resignation of the Government, or any of its members.

The president appoints the chairperson of the Supreme Court, and can dismiss this chairperson and other judges. The president is supposed to deliver annual messages to the Parliament, and has the right to participate in the sessions of Parliament and its bodies. In instances of strike, the president has the right, in instances specified in the law, to defer or suspend a strike for a period not exceeding three months. In international affairs, it is the president's duty to conduct negotiations and sign international treaties, and to appoint and recall diplomatic representatives of the Republic.

Not only is the president the head of government, they are the social leader of Belarus. The president delivers messages to the citizens several times a year and can issue decrees to establish red letter days and national holidays. The president is the main authority for the granting of Belarusian citizen and can present state decorations to honored individuals. The president also has the ability to determine the status of asylum seekers and grant pardons to convicted citizens.

Shoulder straps of the Supreme Commander of the Republic of Belarus

As the supreme commander-in-chief of the Belarusian Armed Forces, the president has the duty to protect the Belarusian territory from internal and external forces. The president can call for a state of emergency in the following cases: natural disasters, a catastrophe, or unrest involving violence or the threat of violence. Regardless if the declaration affects the entire country or sections of it, the Council of the Republic must be notified by the president and must seek their approval within three days of notification. The same rules applies if the president issues a state of martial law in the event of a possible military action against Belarus. The president has to form and head the Security Council of the Republic of Belarus, and can appoint and dismiss the state secretary of the Security Council and the Supreme Command of the Armed Forces.

== Oath of office ==
Before any person can assume the office officially, an oath must be sworn within two months of the election results being finalized. The text of the oath is as follows:

Assuming the office of President of the Republic of Belarus, I solemnly swear to faithfully serve the people of the Republic of Belarus, to respect and safeguard the rights and liberties of man and citizen, to abide by and protect the Constitution of the Republic of Belarus, and to discharge strictly and conscientiously the lofty duties that have been bestowed upon me.

During the inauguration ceremony, members of both houses of the National Assembly, government ministers, officials and judges from the Constitutional, Supreme and Economic Court must be present. Upon reading of the oath, any powers held by a previous president will be transferred to the president-elect. The text of the oath can be found in Article 83 of the Constitution.

== Removal ==
Articles 87 through 89 of the Constitution deal with how the presidency can change hands in-between election cycles. The president has the ability to resign from office at any time under Article 87. The letter of resignation is sent to the House of Representatives and is accepted by them. The president has the ability to be removed from office if their physical or mental health is impaired under Article 88. In order for this to happen, a two-thirds majority must be reached in the House of Representatives and the Council of the Republic on the resolution to remove the president.

An ad hoc committee is formed and must make the determination about the state of health before any motion can begin. If the president has committed a grave crime, such as treason, one-third of the House must bring charges against the president formally. The investigation of the charges will be conducted by the Council of the Republic. In order to evict the president from office, a two-thirds majority is needed to vote in favor of conviction. The criminal case is further sent to the Supreme Court for review. The actions of either option must occur one month after the resolution is passed or the action will be considered void by the Constitution.

== Privileges ==
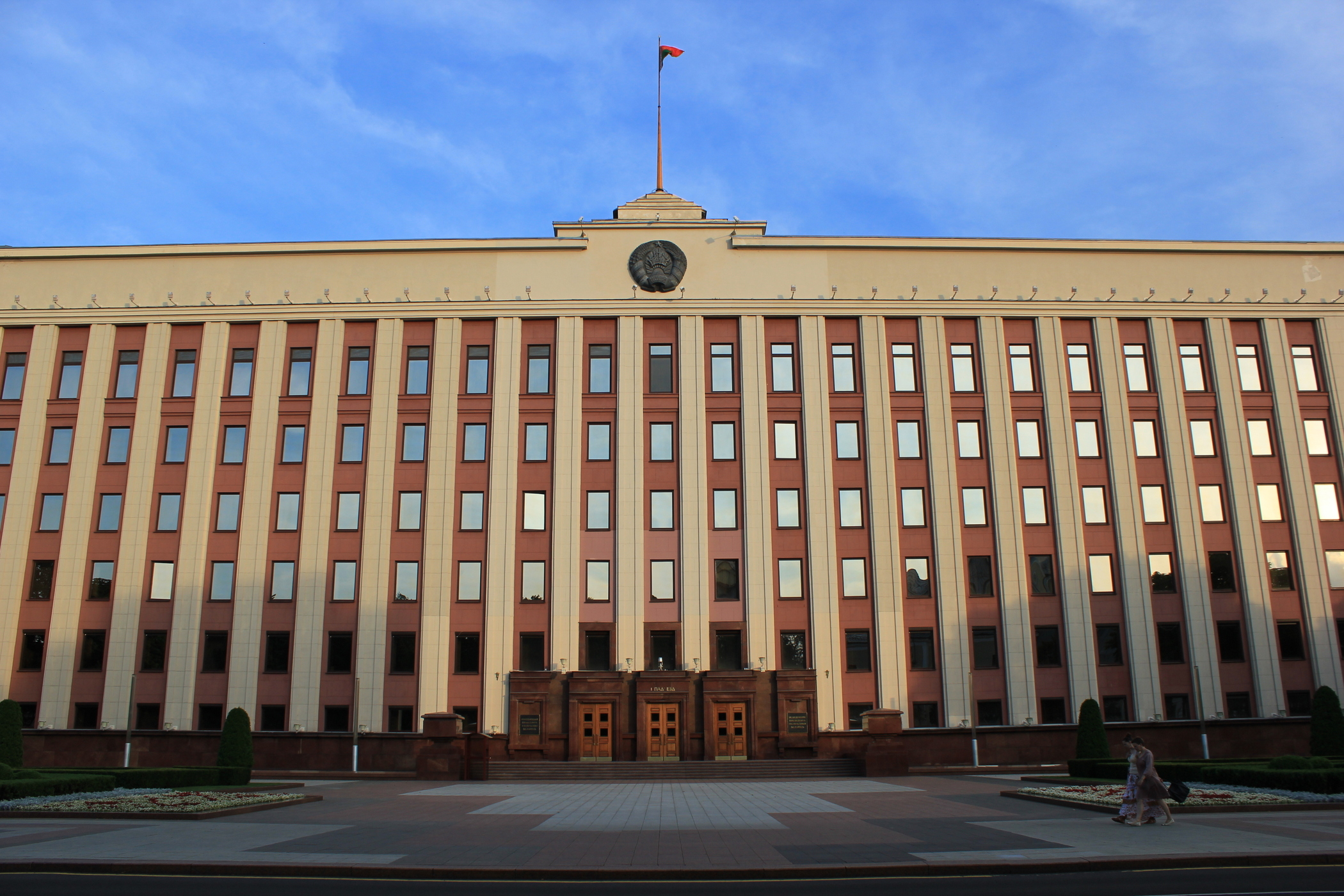
The Presidential Palace

Independence Palace

Under Article 79 of the Constitution, the president is immune from arrest, with exception to the treason/grave crimes clauses listed in Article 88 in the same document. Also under Article 79, the honor and dignity of the president will be protected by national law. Information, either printed in the news or reported on television, that is considered defamation against the president is illegal under Article 5 of the Belarusian Law on Press.

The Presidential Palace (Belarusian: Рэзідэнцыя Прэзідэнта, Russian: Резиденция президента) is a Stalinist Empire style building located on October Square in Minsk surrounded by the streets of Marx, Engels, Kirov and Komsomol. Like the American White House, the streets close to the official residence are closed off to vehicular traffic and are patrolled by police forces. Having been used since 1994, it formerly housed the Central Committee of the Communist Party of Byelorussia. The president also has use of the Independence Palace in Minsk.

== Symbols ==
Officially, the only symbol denoting the presence of the president is the flag of the president of Belarus (Штандар Прэзідэнта Рэспублікі Беларусь). The standard, which has been in use since March 27, 1997, was adopted by a decree called "Concerning the Standard of the President of Republic of Belarus." signed into law by President Lukashenko.

The standard's design is an exact copy of the national flag, with the addition of the Belarusian national emblem in gold. The standard's ratio of 5:6 differs from that of the national flag, making the standard almost square. The standard is bordered by a golden fringe. There are several copies of the standard; the original is kept in the office of the president while other copies are used on buildings, residences and vehicles to denote their presence.

== List of presidents ==
| No. | Portrait | Name (born–died) | Term of office | | | Political party | Elected |
| No. | Portrait | Name (born–died) | Took office | Left office | Time in office | Political party | Elected |
|---|---|---|---|---|---|---|---|
| 1 | | Alexander Lukashenko (born 1954) | 20 July 1994 | Incumbent (Note: Some countries, especially Western nations, do not recognize Lukashenko as the legitimate president of Belarus since the 2020 Belarusian presidential election. However, he continues to have de facto control over Belarus, being supported by Russia and China and by suppressing internal opposition.) | 32 years, 110 days | Independent (close to Belaya Rus) | 1994; 2001; 2006; 2010; 2015; 2020; 2025 |

In the 2020 election, Lukashenko was re-elected for a sixth term with Sviatlana Tsikhanouskaya as the opposition candidate and the runner-up. Tsikhanouskaya would go on to create the Coordination Council, recognised by the Ministry of Internal Affairs of Belarus as an extremist organisation.

== See also ==
- List of national leaders of Belarus
- Academy of Public Administration
- Presidential Administration of Belarus
- Chief of Staff to the President of Belarus
