= Anatoly Malofeyev =

Soviet Belarusian politician (1933–2022)

- Анатоль Малафееў; Анатолий Малофеев
- Malofeyev in 1987

Speaker of the House of Representatives
- In office 3 January 1997 – 21 November 2002
- Preceded by: Position established Syamyon Sharetski (as Chairman of the Supreme Council)
- Succeeded by: Vadim Popov

First Secretary of the Communist Party of Byelorussia
- In office 30 November 1990 – 25 April 1993
- Head of state: Nikolai Dementey
- Head of government: Vyacheslav Kebich
- Preceded by: Yefrem Sokolov
- Succeeded by: Post abolished

First Secretary of the Minsk Regional Committee of the Communist Party of Byelorussia
- In office 29 March 1985 – 5 December 1990
- Preceded by: Vladimir Mikulich
- Succeeded by: Anatoly Bychek

First Secretary of the Gomel Regional Committee of the Communist Party of Byelorussia
- In office 29 March 1985 – 5 December 1990
- Preceded by: Yuri Khousainov
- Succeeded by: Aleksey Kamay

Member of the 28th Politburo
- In office 14 July 1990 – 29 August 1991

Full member of the 27th, 28th Central Committee
- In office 6 March 1985 – 29 August 1991

Personal details
- Born: Anatoly Aleksandrovich Malofeyev; 14 May 1933 Gomel, Byelorussian SSR, Soviet Union
- Died: 19 January 2022 (aged 88)
- Party: Communist Party of the Soviet Union

Anatoly Aleksandrovich Malofeyev (Russian: Анато́лий Алекса́ндрович Малофе́ев, Belarusian: Анатоль Аляксандравіч Малафееў; 14 May 1933 – 19 January 2022) was a first secretary of the communist party of the Byelorussian Soviet Socialist Republic during the Soviet Union era and Belarusian parliament speaker. In March 1985, Malofeyev became the Minsk regional Communist Party leader upon the removal of Vladimir A. Mikulich. He served as First Secretary of the Byelorussian Communist Party from November 1990 to April 1993.

== Parliamentary career ==
During November 1997, Malofeyev and a state delegation traveled to Cuba to meet with Ricardo Alarcón on political and economic matters over seven days. The delegation also met with the Ministry of Foreign Trade and the Ministry of Foreign Investments and Economic Cooperation.

From 6 to 12 September 1998, Malofeyev was a delegate to the 100th Conference of the Inter-Parliamentary Union which was held in Moscow. His comments that the conference failed to address human rights issues in Belarus afterwards generated controversy as its committee and Charter 97 claimed a special measure had been adopted to address those issues as well as several lawsuits.

On 26 July 2000, Malofeyev along with fellow speaker, Pavel Shipuk and Belarusian Prime Minister Vladimir Yermoshin met with Chinese Vice-President Hu Jintao to facilitate relations between the two countries. Jintao suggested parliamentary contacts as a means of enhancing future bilateral relations with both speakers expressing their willing desire to do whatever was necessary to achieve that goal.

== Post parliament ==
During November 2007, Malofeyev, as the Chairman of the Standing Committee for Regional Policy and Local Self-Government of the Belarusian Parliament, visited Turkey upon receiving an invitation from Murat Mercan who is the Chairman of the Foreign Affairs Committee of the Turkish Grand National Assembly. Both countries maintain embassies in the other's respective capital.

On 20 February 2008, as a member of the Council for Cooperation of Local Self-Government Bodies, Malofeyev was part of a round table discussion of the chairmen of village Councils of Deputies. In his opening remarks to the group he said, "You are the primary authorities in the regions, and the ordinary person and his needs should be in the focus of your activities." At the close of the meeting, Malofeyev addressed the deputies to work with non-governmental organizations to implement change on public issues.

Malofeyev died on 19 January 2022, at the age of 88.
