= 1994 Belarusian presidential election =

- 23 June 1994 (first round); 10 July 1994 (second round)
- Turnout: 78.97% (first round); 70.60% (second round)
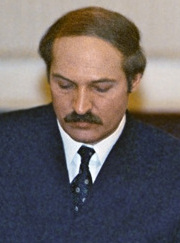

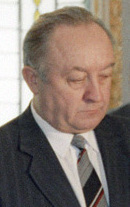
Nominee	Alexander Lukashenko	Vyacheslav Kebich
Party	Independent	Independent
Popular vote	4,241,026	748,329
Percentage	80.61%	14.22%
- First round results
Elected President
Alexander Lukashenko
Independent

Presidential elections were held in Belarus on 23 June 1994, with a second round on 10 July. They were the first national elections held in Belarus since the country seceded from the Soviet Union three years earlier. The result was an overwhelming victory for Alexander Lukashenko, who received 81% of the vote in the second round. Voter turnout was 79% in the first round and 71% in the second.

== Background ==
On 15 March 1994, the Supreme Council adopted the Constitution of Belarus, which made Belarus a democracy with a presidential system. Until the ratification of the constitution, Chairman of the Supreme Council Myechyslaw Hryb had effectively ruled as both the head of state and head of the parliament.

The Constitution set the age requirement for presidential candidates at 35 and demanded at least 10 years of residency in the Republic of Belarus. Candidates could be proposed by 70 members of the Supreme Council, provided they also gathered 100,000 public signatures. For an election to be legitimate, it needed at least 50% voter participation and was conducted using a two-round system.

On 6 April the Central Commission of the Republic of Belarus for Elections and Referendums established a timeline for the first presidential election, which outlined the role of local initiative groups in nominating candidates.

== Electoral system ==
The president of Belarus is elected using the two-round system. If no candidate obtains over 50% of the vote, a second round is held with the top two candidates. The winner of the second round is elected. A turnout quorum of 50% is applied.

== Candidates ==
Six candidates who were recognized by the government to have received the most signatures from Belarusian citizens and to have received substantial support from initiative group members became eligible to contest the first round.

Candidate	Party	Position	Pledges (Note: Pledges received from initiative group members)	Signatures
Vyacheslav Kebich	Independent	Prime Minister of Belarus	3,920	371,967
Zianon Pazniak	Belarusian Popular Front	Head of the Belarusian Popular Front	2,734	216,855
Vasily Novikov	Party of Belarusian Communists	Secretary of the Central Committee of the Party of Belarusian Communists	3,041	183,836
Alexander Lukashenko	Independent	Chairman of the Anti-Corruption Commission of the Supreme Council		156,391
Stanislav Shushkevich	Independent	Former Chairman of the Supreme Council	1,420	123,552
Alaksandar Dubko	Belarusian Agrarian Party	Chairman of the Union of Agrarians	2,901	116,693

== Campaign ==
Prime Minister Vyacheslav Kebich's campaign was bolstered by the apparat of the Supreme Council and open support from Russia, but his initial popular support dwindled following excessive coverage of his candidacy in government-sponsored media. This controversy, in addition to widespread dissatisfaction with his economic reforms, contributed to his defeat in the second round of voting.

Zianon Pazniak, the head of the Belarusian Popular Front, was the strongest proponent of a free-market economy out of all of the candidates. His support for a revitalized Belarusian identity that centered around the primary of the Belarusian culture and language led some opponents to criticize him for being too nationalistic.

Vasily Novikov, the Secretary of the Central Committee of the Party of Belarusian Communists, advocated for a return to collectivization and an end to the process of privatization that had begun following Belarusian independence from the Soviet Union.

Alexander Lukashenko released his campaign platform entitled "To Lead the People Away from the Abyss" on 14 June in the Narodnaya Gazeta, the state newspaper that was run by the Supreme Council. His populist agenda outlined price stabilization, independence of the National Bank, and government austerity programs. A central promise of his campaign was to crush high-level corruption. Responding to criticism that he had no candidates for the position of Prime Minister, he reportedly stated that it was "easier than finding a milkman". He also described a system of guaranteed welfare for vulnerable citizens that would be supported by progressive taxation. Regarding his foreign policy positions, Lukashenko expressed his desire to improve the international standing of Belarus, as well as to restore ties with Russia and Ukraine.

Stanislav Shushkevich, the former Chairman of the Supreme Council, centered his campaign around his role in achieving Belarusian independence from the Soviet Union and subsequent reforms despite substantial communist opposition in the Supreme Council. He also expressed his support for a reduction in the state's role in moderating the economy. Prior to his tenure as Chairman, Shushkevich had also been a vocal critic of the Soviet Union's response to the Chernobyl disaster and its effects on Belarus.

Alaksandar Dubko, the Chairman of the Union of Agrarians, was vocal in his support for collectivization in order to appeal to both agrarians and the peasantry.

== Opinion polls ==
According to a poll conducted by Eridan a week prior to the election, Lukashenko was predicted to lead with 21%, with Kebich at 17.3%, Pozniak at 11.6%, and Shushkevich at 9.9%.

Opinion polls conducted by NOVAK:

Pollster	Date	Lukashenko	Kebich	Pazniak	Shushkevich	Dubko	Novikov
Second round	10 July	80.6%	14.2%				
NOVAK	27 June – 5 July	53.8%	18.6%				
First round	23 June	45.8%	17.7%	13.1%	10.1%	6.1%	4.4%
NOVAK	10 – 18 June	24.8%	20.6%	9,5%	11.6%	5.8%	5.4%
NOVAK	3 – 9 June	21.3%	21.8%	11.9%	13.1%	1.7%	5.8%
NOVAK	7 April – 3 May	28.0%	15.1%	5.5%	10.2%		

A poll conducted by Belarusian pollster NISEPI several months after the elections indicated that Lukashenko secured 80% of the vote in the second round among those who participated in the election. During the first round, his support was at 44.6% among Belarusian speakers and 27.6% among Russian speakers.

Calculated based on NISEPI post-election poll
Demographic subgroup	Dubko/Kebich/Novikov	Lukashenko	Pozniak/Shushkevich	% of total vote
Total vote	25	42	34	100
Gender
Men	24	43	33	46
Women	25	41	34	54
Age
18–30 years old	24	33	43	27
30–50 years old	30	35	35	36
50 and older	20	53	27	36
Educational attainment
Less than general secondary	20	57	23	33
General secondary	27	40	33	30
Vocational or higher	27	29	44	37
Region
City of Minsk	20	27	53	17
Minsk	35	39	35	16
Brest	17	50	32	15
Grodno	28	36	36	10
Vitebsk	32	42	26	14
Mogilev	22	49	29	11
Gomel	16	57	27	16
Area type
Capital	20	27	53	17
Oblast center	29	33	38	19
>50,000 pop.	44	37	19	10
<50,000 pop.	27	39	34	18
Rural	20	54	26	36
Self-assessment of one's financial situation
Poor/below average	23	36	31	66
Average	29	33	38	30
Better than average	19	29	53	4
Which economic system is preferable for Belarus?
Capitalism	21	23	56	35
Socialism	27	55	18	53
Other	25	29	46	12

== Conduct ==
During the election, Lukashenko claimed that he had been the target of a failed assassination attempt. This claim was disputed by the Belarusian KGB despite police reports detailing an attempted car ramming of Lukashenko's vehicle followed by gunshots.

After the first round, both Interfax and Agence France-Presse reported that a grenade had been thrown at the Belarusian secretary for national security.

== Results ==
Candidate	Party	First round		Second round	
Candidate	Party	Votes	%	Votes	%
Alexander Lukashenko	Independent	2,646,140	45.76	4,241,026	80.61
Vyacheslav Kebich	Independent	1,023,174	17.69	748,329	14.22
Zianon Pazniak	Belarusian Popular Front	757,195	13.09		
Stanislav Shushkevich	Independent	585,143	10.12		
Alaksandar Dubko	Belarusian Agrarian Party	353,119	6.11		
Vasily Novikov	Party of Belarusian Communists	253,009	4.38		
Against all		165,023	2.85	271,783	5.17
Total		5,782,803	100.00	5,261,138	100.00
Valid votes		5,782,803	97.94	5,261,138	99.67
Invalid/blank votes		121,509	2.06	17,193	0.33
Total votes		5,904,312	100.00	5,278,331	100.00
Registered voters/turnout		7,476,586	78.97	7,476,205	70.60
Source: Nohlen & Stöver

=== Results by region ===
==== First round ====
Region	Lukashenko		Kebich		Pazniak		Shushkevich		Dubko		Novikov	
Region	Votes	%	Votes	%	Votes	%	Votes	%	Votes	%	Votes	%
Brest	477,969	53.47%	123,862	13.86%	104,779	11.72%	77,735	8.70%	47,403	5.30%	28,347	3.17%
Vitebsk	387079	45.96%	162,751	19.32%	79,235	9.41%	59,967	7.12%	56,569	6.72%	50,146	5.95%
Gomel	407813	45.57%	206,574	23.08%	56,607	6.33%	76,869	8.59%	46,101	5.15%	44,645	4.99%
Grodno	257,743	36.31%	103,555	14.59%	150,581	21.21%	73,694	10.38%	63,972	9.01%	23,227	3.27%
Minsk	433,037	44.46%	145,362	14.93%	149,412	15.34%	84,211	8.65%	77,133	7.92%	41,789	4.29%
Mogilev	451,453	63.01%	121,583	16.97%	33,495	4.68%	27,434	3.83%	31,362	4.38%	25,312	3.53%
City of Minsk	230,914	26.48%	159,049	18.24%	182,896	20.98%	184,923	21.21%	30,525	3.50%	39,490	4.53%
Overseas	132	10.95%	438	36.32%	190	15.75%	310	25.70%	50	4.48%	53	4.39%
Total	2,646,140	44.82%	1,023,174	17.33%	757,195	12.82%	585,143	9.91%	353,119	5.98%	253,009	4.29%
Source: "Central Election Commission of Belarus" (PDF). Archived from the original (PDF) on 3 February 2024.

==== Second round ====
Region	Lukashenko		Kebich	
Region	Votes	%	Votes	%
Brest	707,533	84.87%	86,035	10.32%
Vitebsk	617,078	80.04%	116,867	15.15%
Gomel	637,223	77.40%	149,305	18.13%
Grodno	517,015	80.98%	80,254	12.57%
Minsk	745,112	82.38%	110,927	12.26%
Mogilev	567,843	85.29%	77,522	11.64%
City of Minsk	448,921	70.00%	127,114	19.82%
Overseas	301	41.92%	305	42.47%
Total	4,241,026	80.34%	748,329	14.17%
Source: "Central Election Commission of Belarus" (PDF). Archived from the original (PDF) on 3 February 2024.

=== Maps ===
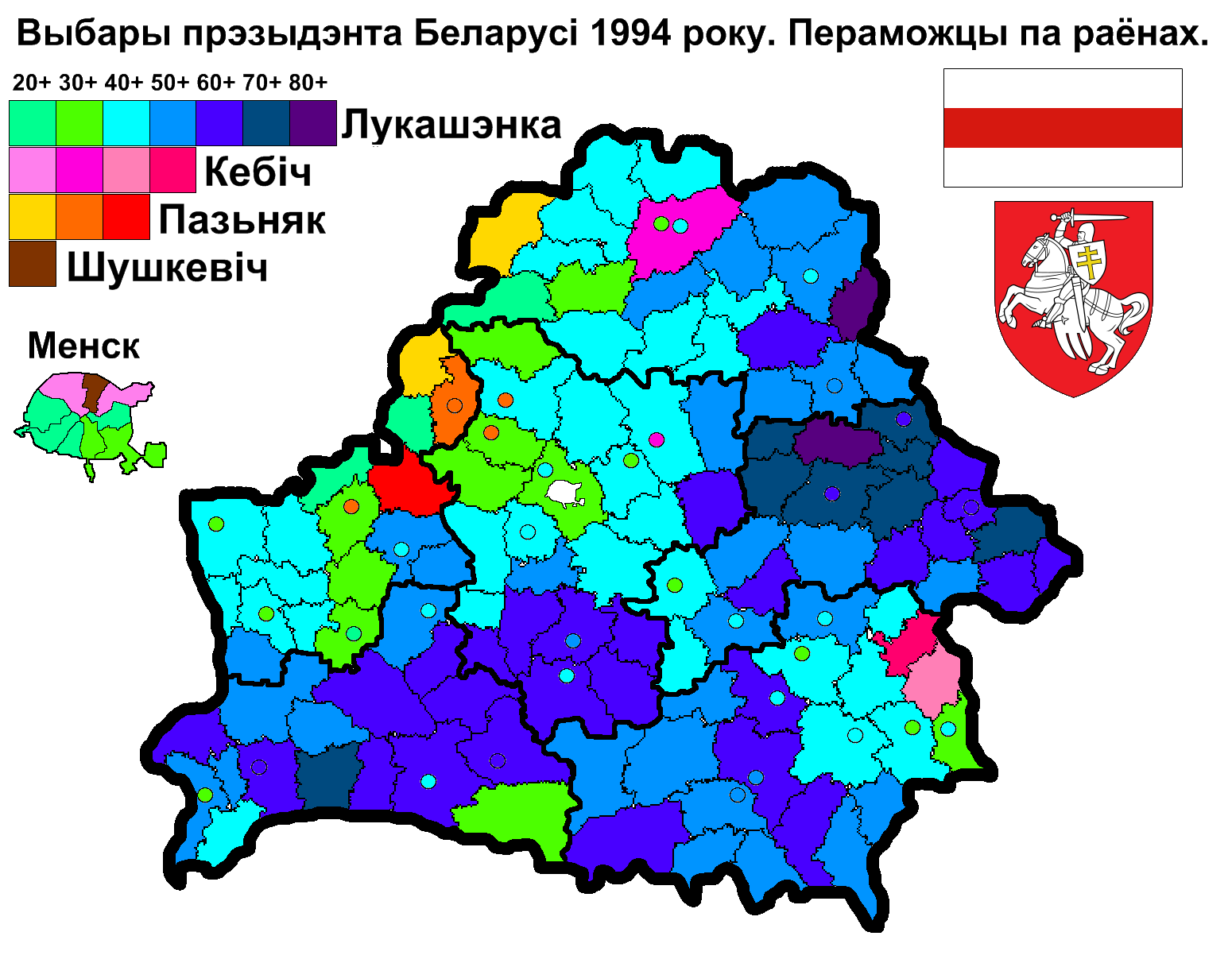
First round results

First round votes for Lukashenko

First round votes for Kebich

First round votes for Pazniak

First round votes for Shushkevich

== Aftermath ==
Lukashenko's victory was a surprise to many, as Prime Minister Vyacheslav Kebich had widely been expected to win by international observers despite extremely close polling results between the two candidates. Regardless, the outcome of the election was recognized as legitimate by the international community. Furthermore, the Commission on Security and Cooperation in Europe expressed its view that Lukashenko's tenure as President would be a step towards a "more pluralistic democracy and free market system" in Belarus.

Upon his victory, Lukashenko pledged there would be "no dictatorship." He was inaugurated as president on July 20. A 1995 referendum resulted in Lukashenko gaining the power to dissolve parliament, as well as restoring modified Soviet-era state symbols and initiating closer ties with Russia. In 1996 Lukashenko began further consolidating his authority with another referendum approving reforms that dramatically increased his powers and extended his original five-year term to 2001, after which he continued to win additional terms. As a result, the 1994 presidential election is considered the only free election held in Belarus since it broke away from the Soviet Union.
