= Constitution of Belarus =

Supreme law of Belarus

Constitution of the Republic of Belarus
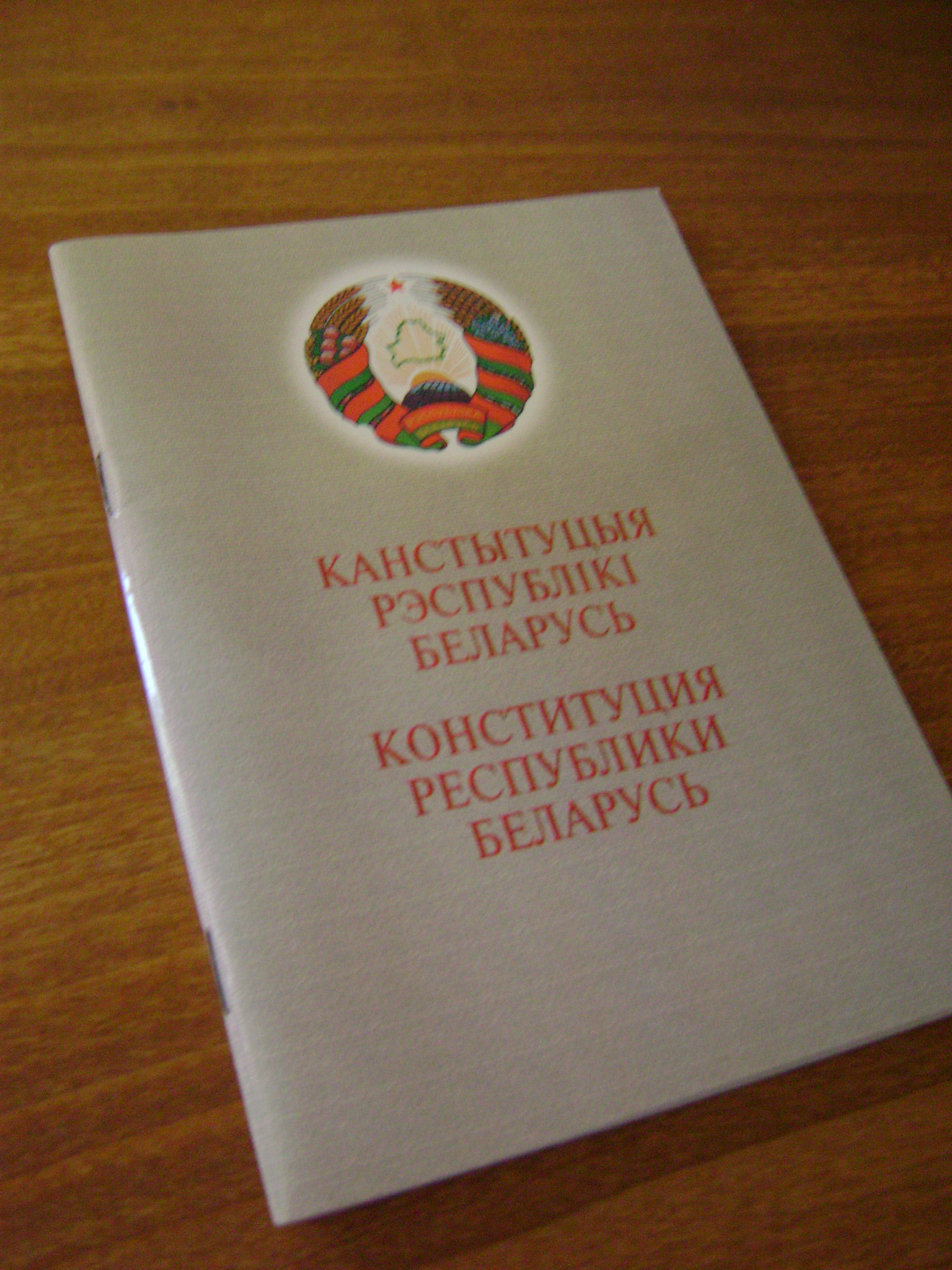
- A pamphlet version of the Constitution distributed to citizens by the government. The document's name is given in Belarusian, followed by Russian.

Overview
- Original title: Канстытуцыя Рэспублікі Беларусь
- Jurisdiction: Republic of Belarus
- Created: 15 March 1994
- System: Unitary semi-presidential republic

Government structure
- Branches: 3
- Head of state: President
- Chambers: Bicameral (National Assembly: Council of the Republic, House of Representatives)
- Executive: Council of Ministers
- Judiciary: Supreme Court; Constitutional Court and others
- Federalism: Unitary

History
- First legislature: 15 October 2000
- Amendments: 3
- Last amended: 15 March 2022
- Signatories: Myechyslaw Hryb, the Supreme Council, and the citizens of Belarus
- Supersedes: 1978 Constitution of the Byelorussian SSR

Full text
- Constitution of the Republic of Belarus at Wikisource

The Constitution of the Republic of Belarus (Belarusian: Канстытуцыя Рэспублікі Беларусь, romanized: Kanstytucyja Respubliki Bielaruś; Russian: Конституция Республики Беларусь, romanized: Konstitutsiya Respubliki Belarus') is the supreme basic law of Belarus. The Constitution is composed of a preamble and nine sections divided into 148 articles.

Adopted in 1994, three years after the country declared its independence from the Soviet Union, this formal document establishes the framework of the Belarusian state and government and enumerates the rights and freedoms of its citizens. However, the United Nations and various observers challenge that the rule of law is respected or that the judiciary is independent in Belarus, highlighting the consolidation of power by the current president.

The constitution was drafted by the Supreme Council of Belarus, the former legislative body of the country and is heavily influenced by Western constitutions. The constitution has been amended thrice under controversial circumstances since the original adoption, in 1996, in 2004 and in 2022. Two referendums that were disputed by independent observers and government opposition leaders increased the power of the presidency over the government and eliminated the term limits for the presidency.

== History ==
The Belarusian Democratic Republic adopted its first temporary constitution several months after declaring independence from the Russian Empire, on October 11, 1918. In 1919, after the occupation of the country by the Russian Bolsheviks, Belarus became a Soviet Republic (USSR), and a new constitution was adopted. Belarus continued to use this constitution until it – along with Russia, Ukraine, and the Transcaucasus – signed a treaty to form the Soviet Union. Now the Byelorussian Soviet Socialist Republic (Byelorussian SSR), the country adopted its first Soviet-era constitution in 1927, complementing the recently adopted Soviet Constitution. After a re-adoption in 1937, the Byelorussian SSR adopted its last Soviet-era constitution in 1978, mainly to reflect changes made in the 1977 Soviet Constitution.

=== Modern constitution ===
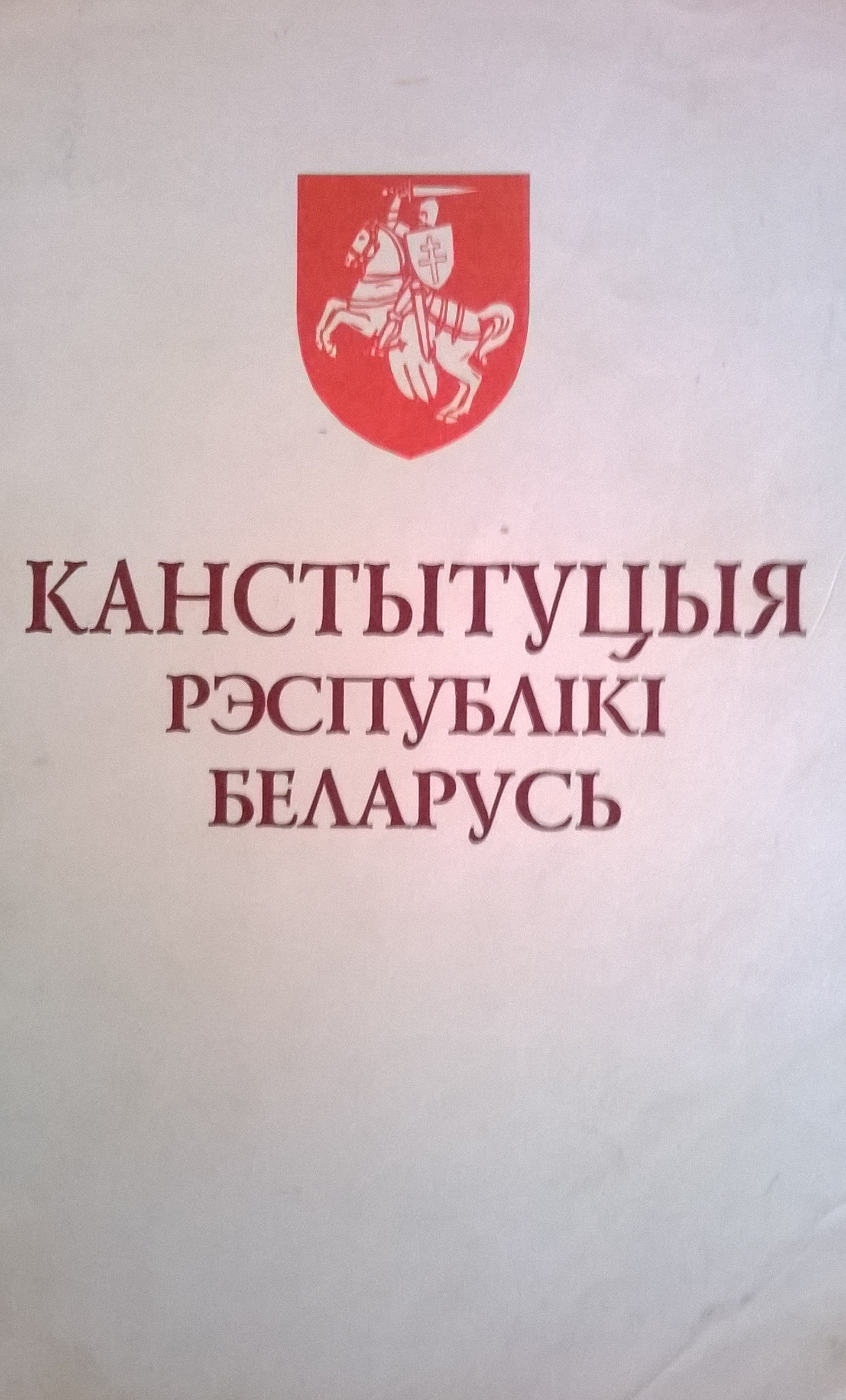
The front page of the 1994 Constitution of Belarus with the Pahonia symbolism.

When Belarus became independent from the Soviet Union in 1991, the Supreme Council of Belarus passed the Declaration of State Sovereignty of the Byelorussian Soviet Socialist Republic, proclaiming Byelorussian SSR acts legal priority over USSR ones (per article 7 of the Declaration, but this provision was inserted into 1978 Constitution only in August 1991) and formally starting a constitutional process in Republic.

Soon afterwards, the government established a Constitution Commission to facilitate the adoption of a post-Soviet constitution. In November 1991, the commission sent the first of three drafts to the Supreme Council. Upon approval from the Supreme Council, the first draft was published in December 1991 in order for the Belarusian populace to make comments and suggestions. Professors Gary M. Shaw of Touro College, New York and Russell L. Weaver of the University of Louisville spent time in Belarus in 1993 advising on drafting the constitution on behalf of Central and East European Law Initiative (CEELI), a project of the American Bar Association. The commission submitted the third and final draft to the Supreme Council, where it was signed on March 15, 1994 by the Speaker of the Supreme Council and Head of State, Myechyslaw Hryb.

The gazette Zvezda officially published the Constitution fifteen days later. The Supreme Council passed a second law along with the Constitution, titled the Enactment Law, rendering the 1978 Byelorussian SSR Constitution and the Declaration of State Sovereignty of the Byelorussian Soviet Socialist Republic void, with a few exceptions. The law, passed during the thirteenth session of the Supreme Council, also provided transitional phases for office holders and government organs to form within two years. Every year since 1994, March 15 has been commemorated in Belarus as Constitution Day, a national holiday.

The Constitution introduces separation of powers. According to Belarusian law, each office is separate but must work together to serve the people. The Constitution also makes Belarus a presidential democracy, significantly reducing the role of the prime minister. Of the fifteen former Soviet republics, Belarus was the one of latest to create and pass a new constitution subsequent to the dissolution of the USSR. A delay occurred due to debates among Supreme Council deputies, who were also trying to stave off the opposition and democratic forces who wanted to close the Supreme Council down for good. A power struggle to determine the relationship between the new executive branch and the legislature caused much of the debate in 1992 and 1993. The former chairman of the Supreme Council, Stanislau Shushkevich, criticized the early drafts due to the amount of power granted to the president. The opposition Belarusian Popular Front criticized the final drafts due to the lack of balance between the two parties and for allowing Vyachaslau Kebich to run for presidential elections in June of that year despite serving in the same role with the SSR.

When drafting the Belarus Constitution, the Supreme Council deputies were influenced by the constitutions of various countries, including Austria, Belgium, Denmark, France, Germany, Italy, Sweden, and the United States. Internally, the Constitution was influenced by the period of Soviet domination and a desire to bring back traditions brushed aside by the Soviet Government. The structure of the Constitution is similar to the Russian Federation: for example, the office of the President has powers analogous to those granted to the President of Russia. Overall, the Constitution sought to preserve the statehood of Belarus from pro-Russian unity movements, provide a strong head of state that could cure the ailments Belarus would endure in the post-Soviet era, and lay out a compromise between the political factions in Belarus.

== Content ==
The constitution is divided in the following way.

=== Preamble ===
In the preamble of the Constitution, Belarus assumes the responsibility for its destiny as a member of the international community. To execute this responsibility, the government undertakes to show "adherence to values common to all mankind, founding ourselves on our inalienable right to self-determination," which is "supported by the centuries-long history of development of Belarusian statehood." Belarus also pledges to honor the rights and freedoms of its citizens and to maintain a stable government that is run by the people and based on the rule of law.

=== Section One: Principles of the Constitutional System ===
Section One is composed of articles 1 to 20. They prescribe a sovereign, multi-party representative democracy, run by the people of Belarus, that forms its own foreign policy. Section One also establishes that the state protects the rights and freedoms of its citizens, but contains the proviso that a citizen of Belarus "bears a responsibility towards the State to discharge unwaveringly the duties imposed upon him by the Constitution." Article 4 establishes that democracy "is realized on the basis of the ideology of the Belarusian statehood", which is unusual provision compared to the constitutions of other post-Soviet countries, that prohibit state ideologies.

The government itself has a system of checks and balances for each branch of the government, but all of the branches are to be independent from influence from the other branches. The government is authorized to pass laws conforming with the provisions of the Constitution, by which it is expected to abide. If the laws do not conform with the Constitution, then they can be declared void. The laws themselves are subject to international law and Belarus is willing to "recognize the supremacy of the universally acknowledged principles of international law and ensure that its laws comply with such principles."

The territory of Belarus is divided into discrete regions, called oblasts. The oblasts are further divided into districts which are in turn subdivided into cities. The Constitution also allows for special regions to be created, which are to be controlled by legislation. Citizens of Belarus are also promised protection and sponsorship, regardless of whether they are inside Belarusian borders or in a foreign country. With some exceptions, those who do not have a nationality and foreigners are, under the Constitution, granted the same status and rights as citizens of Belarus. Belarus also has the power to grant asylum to those who have been subject to persecution due to their ethnic background, political ideology or religious affiliation.

The Constitution also establishes Belarusian and Russian as the official languages of the country, pledges neutrality and non-nuclear proliferation, adopts national symbols, and establishes Minsk as the capital (Minsk was previously the capital of the Byelorussian Soviet Socialist Republic).

=== Section Two: The Individual, Society and the State ===
Section Two describes rights the government grants to citizens. According to the document, providing and protecting these basic rights, which include the "right to a dignified standard of living, including appropriate food, clothing, housing and likewise a continuous improvement of necessary living conditions", is the top priority of the government. These rights are granted to all citizens of Belarus and every Belarusian is to be treated equally under Belarusian law. However, these rights can be removed for national security reasons or if Belarus is under a state of emergency. No one is allowed to "enjoy advantages and privileges that are contrary to the law." A state of emergency, which can be called by the President of Belarus according to Article 84, has to be approved by the Council of the Republic within three days of its announcement, according to Article 98.

The Constitution provides that life is a right and that the government will protect the lives of its citizens against other citizens who wish to harm them or their property. The Constitution also allows for the death penalty to be exercised for grave crimes, but only in accordance with national law. If citizens are arrested, they are granted due process of law and do not have to testify against themselves or their family members. Citizens are also given the right to vote, housing, compensation for their share of work, and have the ability to move wherever they wish inside Belarus, and have the right to protest against the government.

=== Section Three: Electoral System. Referendum ===
Section Three is divided into two chapters dealing with the organization and running of elections. The first chapter deals with the Belarusian electoral system and the second chapter details the organization of national referendums.

In Belarus, the right to vote in elections and plebiscites is extended to those who are above the age of eighteen. During elections and plebiscites, a citizen can vote or not vote without any consequences from the government. The Constitution describes two methods of preventing a citizen from voting. First, a court can issue an order stating that the citizen does not have the mental capacity to understand and to cast a ballot. Second, a person being held in detention or confined in a prison during an election cannot cast a ballot. The Constitution says nothing about the voting rights of those who have served their prison terms, nor does it state how those citizens gain the rights back.

National referendums, or plebiscites, are elections whereby citizens can determine whether a specific legal text can become official law or not. For this to take place, one of the following conditions must be met: The president wishes to hold one, both houses of the National Assembly request to hold one, or the citizens petition for it. If the National Assembly calls for a plebiscite, a majority is needed in both chambers for it to be official. If the citizens request a plebiscite, they must gather 430,000 signatures from eligible voters across the country. Additionally, over 30,000 people from each region must sign the petition, including the capital Minsk. Once either condition is met, the president must issue a decree setting the date of the national plebiscite. The plebiscite must take place less than three months after the decree was signed. Local cities can hold their own plebiscites if ten percent of the local population ask for it.

=== Section Four: The President, Parliament, Government, the Courts ===
Section Four, which is divided into four chapters, outlines the functions of the Belarusian Government, mainly the President of the Republic of Belarus, the Council of Ministers, the Parliament of Belarus and the courts. Although elected by the Belarusian people, the president must not be a member of a political party when he or she assumes office. The Constitution also lists official duties for various posts, such as the president being the commander-in-chief of the Belarusian Armed Forces. The section also describes procedures for situations where the president cannot continue duties or if the president dies in office.

Chapter Four lists the powers and duties of the Parliament of Belarus, which is called the National Assembly. The National Assembly itself is divided into two houses: the lower House of Representatives and the upper Council of the Republic. While each house has its own rules governing how members are elected, members decide on the various bills that could become Belarusian law and approve the nominations of cabinet heads that the president chooses.

The Council of Ministers of the Republic of Belarus, headed by the prime minister, is the body of officials that are heads of various ministries of the Belarusian government. The president appoints each member of the council, but the National Assembly must also approve each member. Council members stays on until their term as a minister is over or the president has been replaced.

The Constitutional Court of the Republic of Belarus is the highest court in Belarus. While other courts deal with civil or criminal issues, the Constitutional Court deals with matters involving the Constitution and the legality of certain laws passed by the government. The court has the power to declare any law unconstitutional. From April until May 2007, the Constitutional Court reviewed 101 laws and decrees; they were deemed to be constitutional. The court that deals with criminal law matters is the Supreme Court of Belarus.

=== Section Five: Local Government and Self-Government ===
Section Five permits the formation of local governments. Local governments are selected by the local population and they have the power to administer local affairs, such as budgets, social services, and economic development. They also have the authority to collect taxes. The president can appoint and dismiss the heads of the local governments on the approval of the relevant local council of deputies.

=== Section Six: The Procurator's Office. The State Supervisory Committee ===
Section Six lists the office and duties of the prosecutor general (Procurator General in the official translation) and the State Supervisory Committee. The prosecutor general and his appointed assistant prosecutors are tasked with the balanced implementation of national, regional and local laws on all sectors of government and public society. The prosecutor general is appointed by the president with permission from the Council of the Republic.

The State Supervisory Committee is tasked with monitoring the national budget, implementing the president's economic policy, and regulating the use of government property. As with the prosecutor general, the State Supervisory Committee is appointed by the president.

=== Section Seven: Financial and Credit System of the Republic of Belarus ===
Section Seven specifies the fiscal responsibilities of Belarus. A national budget must be created, along with budgets for the local regions and cities. The money used in the national budget is acquired from national taxes and fines, and payments made to Belarus by foreign governments. At the end of a fiscal year, the National Assembly must review the budget for the next fiscal year within five months. After the review and passing of the national budget, it is published for public viewing. Local budgets follow the same procedures. The National Bank of the Republic of Belarus is the state bank of Belarus and is the office responsible for issuing the national currency, the Belarusian rubel.

=== Section Eight: The Application of the Constitution ===
Section Eight describes processes for enforcing and amending the Constitution. The Constitution is the supreme law of the land, therefore other laws and edicts cannot conflict with it. If a conflict occurs, the Constitution applies. If the Constitution is not in conflict, but a law and a decree is, the law would be enforced.

To amend the Constitution, one of two things must happen before the National Assembly can consider the measure: The president must suggest the change, or 150,000 eligible voters must send a petition to the National Assembly. Both chambers of the National Assembly must discuss the proposed amendments for a minimum of three months. Two conditions can prevent a discussion from taking place: Either there is a state of emergency, or there are less than six months in the current term of the House of Representatives. In order for an amendment to take effect, it must be approved by either two-thirds of both chambers of the National Assembly or a simple majority of the voting population of Belarus in a national referendum. The only restriction is that Sections One, Two, Four and Eight can only be changed by national referendum. Rules for conducting a national referendum are enumerated in Chapters 22 through 25 of the Electoral Code of the Republic of Belarus. Since the original adoption of the Constitution in 1994, it has been amended twice; once in 1996 and once in 2004.

=== Section Nine: Final and Transitional Clauses ===
The ninth and last section of the Constitution was added following passage of the 1996 revision of Constitution and addresses laws passed before 1996. If the laws that were passed before the adoption of the Constitution are not in conflict with the Constitution, they are still enforced. All changes to the Constitution come into effect when formally issued by the president, unless specified otherwise. With the passage of the 1996 revision of the Constitution, the 1994 law "On the Procedure Governing the Entry into Force of the Constitution of the Republic of Belarus" ceased to be enforced. As a transitional measure, Section Nine states that the present (as of November 1996) leadership of Belarus can continue to serve until their term of service has been completed. When the Constitution is enforced, the national government is allowed to exercise their assigned duties. Unless otherwise stated in Article 143, Part 3, the national leadership must form state governmental bodies two months after the Constitution goes into effect.

== Amendments ==
After Lukashenko assumed the presidency in 1994, he stated his intention to amend the recently passed Constitution. The amendments, according to Lukashenko, would expand the power of his office, marking a turning point in post-Soviet era politics in Belarus. A May 1995 national referendum was the first step in the amendment process. Out of the four questions, one asked if the president could disband parliament if the members violate national law. The vote, which several Supreme Council deputies protested, resulted in 77% in favor of the provision regarding the dismissal of the legislature by the president. Other questions on the ballot, such as the national flag and national emblem, didn't affect the Constitution as a whole, but their status has been decided by the Constitution. Two years later, Lukashenko scheduled the first referendum that would potentially alter the Constitution. The last referendum on the Constitution occurred in 2022, also scheduled by Lukashenko.

=== 1996 ===
More calls for constitutional reform came in 1996. President Lukashenko unilaterally established the referendum after the Supreme Council refused to support the measures or set up a date for the vote. An earlier attempt by the Supreme Council to establish their own referendum in September 1996 was struck down as "inconsistent with the Constitution" by the Constitutional Court. The referendum amended the Constitution mostly to strengthen the power of the presidency. Amongst the changes made were the following:

1- The Supreme Council, the unicameral parliament of Belarus, was abolished. The Supreme Council was replaced by the National Assembly, a bicameral parliament;

2- The term of President Alexander Lukashenko was extended from 1999 until 2001.

During the referendum, 84% of the approximately 7.5 million voters approved the amendments. On November 28 of that year, President Lukashenko signed the changes into law. Other results not directly related to the voting included the expanding role of the Council of Ministers, which allowed it to deal with issues related to development of economic, social and political spheres within Belarus. The 1996 referendum was not, however, the first call to dissolve the Supreme Council. In 1991 and 1992, after the August coup in Moscow by senior CPSU officials, democratic forces in the government wanted to dissolve the Supreme Council permanently. The members of the Belarusian Popular Front pressed for a referendum, and despite achieving the number of signatures required by law at the time, the Supreme Council quashed the measure.

The results of the 1996 referendum led to the exclusion of opposition parties from the new parliament. Due to problems associated with transparency and ballot stuffing, the European Union, United States and several other nations do not recognize the results of the vote.

=== 2004 ===
Along with choosing members for the National Assembly, Belarusian voters were presented with a referendum regarding presidential term limits. Before the vote, President Alexander Lukashenko was only allowed to serve two terms before the Constitution required him to step down. The voter turnout for the referendum was nearly 90%, with 77.3% of the voters agreeing to eliminating term limits. The changes were implemented on October 17, 2004. Like the 1996 referendum, the validity of the vote was brought into question. According to the Organization for Security and Co-operation in Europe (OSCE), many polling places went without independent observers. The OSCE believed that the standards of the vote did not meet OSCE requirements for "free and fair elections". Data from other non-governmental organizations (NGO) point out that 50% of voters did not participate in the referendum, so they contend that the results reported by the government are flawed. Two years later, Lukashenko ran in the 2006 election and won 83% of the vote during the first ballot. With no term limits, Lukashenko states that, depending on his health, he will not retire from politics and might run for re-election in 2011.

=== 2022 ===
A constitutional referendum was held in Belarus on 27 February 2022. The referendum was ordered by President Alexander Lukashenko in January 2022. Proposed changes to the Constitution included allowing Lukashenko to remain in office until 2035 and empowering the All-Belarusian People's Assembly, an extra-parliamentary body composed mostly of state officials. The changes also renounced Belarus's nuclear-free zone status, allowing Belarus to host nuclear weapons; the lead-up to the referendum occurred as Russia amassed its troops in both Russia and Belarus in the prelude to the Russian invasion of Ukraine, and the election itself was held several days after Russia began its military offensive into Ukraine.

According to the Central Election Commission of Belarus (CEC), 65.2% of voters voted in favor of the amendments to the State Constitution.

The referendum was carried out in an atmosphere of repression; the Belarusian opposition was not permitted to campaign, and the voting process was considered neither free nor fair. The referendum was denounced as a sham by the Belarusian opposition and its exiled leader Sviatlana Tsikhanouskaya, by the European Union, and the United States.

=== Criticism of constitutional changes ===
The 1996 and 2004 referendums were severely criticized by the political opposition inside Belarus as well as by international observers such as the OSCE. Observers state that the two referendums were non-transparent and that the real results were not published. Observers were not allowed to see the process of counting ballots. Specifically, the democratic opposition to President Lukashenko decided to boycott the 1996 referendum on the Constitution. During the same election, international observers found problems with the voting process or found pro-government advertisements or notices at polling places. Opposition parties contend that the vote to dissolve the Supreme Council in 1996 removed Belarus' last democratically elected parliament and installed Lukashenko's hand-picked parliament.

While there were claims of manipulation of the elections and the Constitution itself, some parts of the 2004 constitution were supported by key leaders of the Belarusian democratic opposition. In a 2005 interview with Radio Free Europe, presidential candidate Alaksandar Milinkievič stated that Belarus' stance as a neutral country, stated in Article 18 of the 2004 constitution, should be preserved with regard to joining NATO and the European Union.

== Judicial review ==
In a 1998 journal, the New York University School of Law noted that Belarusian legal scholars came up with a new theory to deal with jurisprudence. Laws are constitutional if they follow the will of President Lukashenko and the people; unconstitutional if the president and the people do not like it. The laws that fall in the latter category are considered "ignored" by the legal scholars. In June 1999, a Special Rapporteur on the Independence of Judges and Lawyers from the United Nations visited Belarus and noted inconsistency between national laws, decrees and the Constitution. The UN rapporteur, Dato Param Cumaraswamy, especially noted that temporary decrees issued by the national authorities are still in force, even if they had expired or contradict the Constitution.

== Draft Constitution from the Office of Sviatlana Tsikhanouskaya ==
In 2021 a Civil Constitution Commission, appointed by Sviatlana Tsikhanouskaya’s Representative for Constitutional Reform, produced a draft "Constitution for New Belarus". According to the official site of Sviatlana Tsikhanouskaya, "the Constitution for New Belarus is a modern European constitution, which will ensure the transition from an authoritarian to a democratic, parliamentary form of government".

Twenty-eight international consultants provided expertise in drafting the constitution.

The draft constitution was published on July 14, 2022 on the site kanstytucyja.online.
