= 1996 Belarusian referendum =

1996 referendum on political changes

A seven-question referendum was held in Belarus on 24 November 1996. Four questions were put forward by Alexander Lukashenko, the president of Belarus, on changing the date of the country's independence day, amending the constitution of Belarus, changing laws on the sale of land and the abolition of the death penalty. The Supreme Council put forward three questions on constitutional amendments by the Communist and Agrarian factions, local elections and the national finances.

All of Lukashenko's proposals were approved, namely changing Belarus's national day, amending the constitution, and retaining the death penalty and a ban on land sales. Voter turnout was said to be 84.1%. The referendum, like its 1995 predecessor, was condemned by international organizations including the OSCE Parliamentary Assembly, as falling far short of democratic standards, while others said it was a further consolidation of Lukashenko's dictatorship.

== Background ==
In the summer of 1996 Lukashenko presented constitutional amendments for approval to the Supreme Soviet. The Soviet then produced a counterproposal, one provision of which would abolish the position of President. The ensuing power struggle escalated quickly, leading to intervention by Russian officials to try and negotiate a compromise that included declaring that the referendum would not be binding.

== Questions ==
Voters were asked whether they approved of:

1. Independence Day (Republic Day) being moved from 27 July, the day of the Declaration of Sovereignty of Belarus from the Soviet Union, to 3 July, the day of liberation of Belarus from Nazi Germany in 1944;
2. Constitutional amendments put forward by President Lukashenko, which dramatically increased the president's power. Among other things, these amendments gave Lukashenko's decrees the force of law, gave him near-total control over the budget and extended his term to 2001;
3. The free sale of property;
4. The abolition of the death penalty;
5. The constitutional amendments put forward by the Supreme Soviet;
6. Direct elections to local bodies;
7. All state expenses being part of the national budget.

== Results ==
| Question | For | | Against | | Invalid/ blank | Total votes | Registered voters | Turnout | Result |
| Question | Votes | % | Votes | % | Invalid/ blank | Total votes | Registered voters | Turnout | Result |
|---|---|---|---|---|---|---|---|---|---|
| Independence Day | 5,450,830 | 89.4 | 646,708 | 10.6 | 83,925 | 6,181,463 | 7,346,397 | 84.1 | Approved |
| Increased powers for the president | 5,175,664 | 88.2 | 689,642 | 11.8 | 316,157 | 6,181,463 | 7,346,397 | 84.1 | Approved |
| Free sale of property | 948,756 | 15.6 | 5,123,386 | 84.4 | 109,321 | 6,181,463 | 7,346,397 | 84.1 | Rejected |
| Abolition of the death penalty | 1,108,226 | 18.2 | 4,972,535 | 81.8 | 100,702 | 6,181,463 | 7,346,397 | 84.1 | Rejected |
| Constitutional amendments proposed by the Supreme Soviet | 582,437 | 10.0 | 5,230,763 | 90.0 | 368,263 | 6,181,463 | 7,346,397 | 84.1 | Rejected |
| Direct elections to local bodies | 1,739,178 | 28.7 | 4,321,866 | 71.3 | 120,419 | 6,181,463 | 7,346,397 | 84.1 | Rejected |
| All state expenses are part of the national budget | 1,989,252 | 32.8 | 4,070,261 | 67.2 | 121,950 | 6,181,463 | 7,346,397 | 84.1 | Rejected |
Source: Nohlen & Stöver

== Aftermath ==
After Lukashenko and the Supreme Soviet signed an agreement that the Soviet would make the final decision on adopting the constitutional amendments, Lukashenko broke the agreement. After the constitution was promulgated a new House of Representatives was assembled, with only Lukashenko loyalists admitted. Around sixty members of the Supreme Soviet who rejected the new constitution continued to work in the Soviet, which was recognised as the legitimate parliament by the international community.

== Controversies and subsequent assessments ==
Due to several violations of electoral norms and Lukashenko's use of the state-owned media, Russia and some other CIS countries were the only members of the OSCE to recognise the results.

The Belarusian Helsinki Committee found that:

1. The local referendum commissions that should have been formed by local legislative bodies no later than one month before the referendum, were only set up for 5–7 days;
2. President Lukashenko illegally removed Viktar Hanchar, chairman of the Central Commission for Elections and National Referendums, from office. As a result, the work of the commission, that was supposed to control the legality of the vote, was paralyzed;
3. By the time early voting began (9 November), polling stations had not been provided with proposed amendments and additions to the Constitutions, so the citizens did not know what they were voting for;
4. Voters were illegally called (and in many cases forced) to vote earlier than the actual date of the referendum. As a result, by the day of the referendum, nearly a quarter of voters has already voted;
5. Ballot papers were printed by the Office of Presidential Affairs of the Republic of Belarus. They were taken to polling stations without passing through the Central Commission for Elections and National Referendums and its regional divisions. There was no accounting for the number of ballots;
6. The referendum was funded not from the state budget, but from unknown "charitable" contributions, which was illegal. The Central Commission for Elections and National Referendums was completely removed from funding the referendum;
7. There was agitation and propaganda in favour of the position of President Lukashenko. In some cases the agitation was carried out directly at polling stations;
8. On the day of the referendum, observers, representatives of political parties and public organizations had obstacles placed in their way in trying to monitoring the voting, they were not allowed to enter the voting stations and were not given information they required;
9. There were numerous violations of the law at polling stations, such as no booths for secret ballots, no draft amendments and additions to the Constitution, voters allowed to vote without presenting identification documents, damaged seals on ballot boxes, and evidence of forgery of voter signatures.

The opposition also spoke of rigging of the referendum. According to Sergey Kalyakin, head of the Eurocommunist faction of the parliament, 20 to 50 percent of the votes counted have been falsified. Syamyon Sharetski, speaker of parliament, called the 1996 referendum "a farce and violence against the people" and said that "the outcome of such a plebiscite could not be accepted either in Belarus nor by the international community". The opposition did not recognise the results of the referendum, nor those of the previous referendum held in 1995. The oppositional Conservative Christian Party calls for a return to the Constitution of 1994. Alena Skryhan, the deputy head of Communist fraction of the Parliament in 1996 said that the referendum had led to monopolization of all branches of power by president Lukashenko. Since then, various Belarusian opposition figures and former officials have criticized the referendum, with former Minister of Labour, Aliaksandr Sasnou, calling it a "coup".

The Washington Post has also described the 1996 referendum in Belarus as a "bloodless coup d'etat", stating that "although the Belarussian president has dressed up his power grab in the garments of democracy, there is not much dispute about the illegitimacy of his actions."

The exiled Rada of the Belarusian Democratic Republic said in a 2016 public statement:

"The referendum of 1996 was organized and conducted with significant violations of the Belarusian legislation of that time, which makes its results legally invalid. It became a decisive stage of a constitutional coup carried out by a group of individuals headed by then-President Aliaksandr Lukashenka.

The illegal referendum became a formal cover for the final destruction of the democratic achievements of Belarus in the late 1980s and early 1990s. The society and the parliament of Belarus were deprived of control over the executive branch of state government, a blow was inflicted on local self-government, while the change of the date of the Independence Day of Belarus was another blow to Belarusian national values. (...)

The coup d'etat of 1995-1996 led to the international isolation of Belarus, put it in an extremely high dependence on Russia, deprived it of the prospects of European integration, which represents an immediate danger to the state sovereignty of Belarus."
