= Syamyon Sharetski =

Belarusian former politician

- Сямён Шарэцкі

Chairman of the Supreme Soviet of the Republic of Belarus
- In office 10 January 1996 – 28 November 1996
- President: Alexander Lukashenko
- Preceded by: Myechyslaw Hryb
- Succeeded by: Position abolished Anatoly Malofeyev (as Speaker of the House of Representatives)

Personal details
- Born: Syamyon Georgiyevich Sharetski; 23 September 1936 (age 89) Laurushava, Poland (now Belarus)
- Party: Agrarian Party

Syamyon Georgiyevich Sharetski (Belarusian: Сямён Георгіевіч Шарэцкi, romanized: Siamion Hieorhijevič Šarecki, Russian: Семён Георгиевич Шарецкий, romanized: Semyon Georgiyevich Sharetsky; born 23 September 1936) is a Belarusian former agricultural scientist and politician. He was the last acting Chairman of the Supreme Soviet of Belarus.

== Early life and career ==
Sharetski was born in 1936 and studied agricultural economics at the Belarusian Agricultural Academy. In 1970 he joined the Central Committee of the Communist Party, where he enrolled in the Higher Party School. After graduating he taught at the school from 1970 to 1976.

After leaving his position as chairman of the Red Banner collective farm in 1993, he transitioned to a new role as an advisor to the Prime Minister of Belarus.

== Political career ==
During the leadup to the 1996 Belarusian referendum Sharetski emerged as among the leaders of the opposition, which viewed President Alexander Lukashenko, the main backer of the referendum, as centralising authority in his own hands. Along with the Supreme Court, Sharetski led the Supreme Council in opposing Lukashenko's efforts to overhaul the constitution. Sharetski ultimately accepted the proposed referendum following a diplomatic intervention by Russian Prime Minister Viktor Chernomyrdin.

On 21 July 1999, when the 1995–1999 ended, deputies of the Supreme Council who remained faithful of the 1994 Constitution of Belarus (but actually out of power) appointed Sharetski acting President of the Republic of Belarus.

== Exile ==
From 1999-2001 he lived in Vilnius, Lithuania, where he was treated as a representative of the legitimate power of Belarus. Since 2001 he lives in the US, where he was given a status of political refugee.
