= Myechyslaw Hryb =

Head of State of Belarus in 1994

- Мечыслаў Грыб; Мечислав Гриб
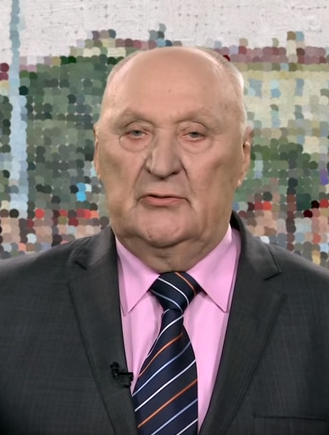
- Hryb in 2015

2nd Chairman of the Supreme Council Of Belarus
- In office 28 January 1994 – 10 January 1996 (Note: Head of state until 20 July 1994)
- Prime Minister: Vyacheslav Kebich; Mikhail Chigir
- Preceded by: Stanislav Shushkevich Vyacheslav Kuznetsov (acting)
- Succeeded by: Alexander Lukashenko (as President); Syamyon Sharetski (as the Chairman of the Supreme Council)

Personal details
- Born: Myechyslaw Ivanavich Hryb; 25 September 1938 (age 88) Sawicze, Nowogródek Voivodeship, Poland
- Party: SDP

Military service
- Branch/service: Militsiya (Belarus)
- Years of service: 1959–1994
- Rank: Lieutenant General

Myechyslaw Ivanavich Hryb (Belarusian: Мечыслаў Іванавіч Грыб, IPA: [mʲɛt͡ʂɨˈslaw iˈvanavʲid͡ʐ‿ˈɣrɨp]; Russian: Мечислав Иванович Гриб, IPA: [mʲɪtɕɪˈslaf‿ɨˈvanəvʲɪdʑ‿ˈɡrʲip]; born 25 September 1938) is a Belarusian politician who was the second head of state of Belarus from January to July 1994 and the second chairman of the Supreme Council of Belarus from 1994 to 1996.

In his capacity as the head of state, Hryb adopted the first Constitution of Belarus. He also held the 1994 presidential elections where Alexander Lukashenko replaced him in the new office called president, which became the new head of state office. He retained his role continued as a parliamentary speaker. Hryb is now a politician in the opposition and a member of the Social-Democratic Party.

== Early life and police career ==
Myechyslaw Hryb was born on September 25, 1938, in the village of Sawicze, then part of the Second Polish Republic (now the Dyatlovsky District of the Grodno Oblast), into a peasant family. A year later, World War II began, during which his father, Ivan, would die.

He went to school in Dyatlovo and began working from the seventh grade, first digging peat, then as an auxiliary worker at a construction site.

In 1959 he graduated from the Lviv State University of Life Safety, and upon returning to Belarus, he worked as a fire inspector for three years and became interested in the investigation of fires and arson. He entered the Faculty of Law of the Belarusian State University in absentia. He served as a police inspector of the Internal Affairs Department of the Plissky District Executive Committee of the Vitebsk Region. From 1962 to 1981, he served in various law enforcement positions in Vitebsk. In 1967, he graduated from the Faculty of Law of the Belarusian State University.

In 1981, he was made head of the Public Order Protection Department of the MVD of the BSSR. Four years later, in 1985, he was promoted to Head of the Department of Internal Affairs of the Vitebsk Regional Executive Committee. Immediately after his appointment, he headed the investigation of the so-called "Vitebsk Case" on the serial killer and rapist Gennady Mikhasevich.

== Supreme Soviet ==
In 1990, Hryb took part in the parliamentary elections and won in his area. In the same year, he joined the Democratic Club, created in the Supreme Soviet by deputies who supported the building of democracy in Belarus. In parliament, Hryb headed the permanent Commission on National Security, Defense and Combating Crime, within which he lobbied in every possible way for Belarus to join the Collective Security Treaty within the framework of the Commonwealth of Independent States, which drew the country into Russia's sphere of influence. In 1993, he was the first in the republic to receive the rank of major general of militia. According to the information from the depository of the international agreement published on the Unified Register of Legal Acts and Other Documents of the Commonwealth of Independent States (under the executive committee of the Commonwealth of Independent States), Belarus officially notified its accession to the Collective Security Treaty on 31 December 1993 when Stanislav Shushkevich was still the head of state.

On 15 April 1994, Hryb, as head of state and ex officio member of the Council of Heads of State of the Commonwealth of Independent States, on behalf of Belarus signed the Agreement on the creation of a free trade area as "the first stage of the creation of the Economic Union" (which is still as of 2024 used by Belarus for foreign trade, in particular, with Azerbaijan and Georgia), as well as the "Agreement on Ukraine's accession to the Economic Union as an associate member" (which has never entered into force).

== In opposition ==
In October 2020, Hryb was appointed by opposition leader Sviatlana Tsikhanouskaya to a Public Constitutional Commission as its Chairman, tasked with proposing democratic reforms to the Constitution of Belarus. This opposition panel is not recognized by the government of Alexander Lukashenko.

== Personal life ==
He is a Catholic. He is married, and has two children (the son is a doctor, the daughter is a lawyer) and a grandson. Hryb mostly communicates in Russian, having studied Belarusian later in life.

== Notes ==
Political offices
Preceded by Vyacheslau Kuznyetsov (acting)	Leader of Belarus; 1994	Succeeded by Alexander Lukashenko
