= Yefrem Sokolov =

Belarusian politician (1926–2022)

- Ефрем Соколов; Яфрэм Сакалоў

First Secretary of the Communist Party of Byelorussia
- In office 6 February 1987 – 28 November 1990
- Head of state: Georgy Tarazevich; Nikolai Dementey
- Head of government: Mikhail Kovalev; Vyacheslav Kebich
- Preceded by: Nikolay Slyunkov
- Succeeded by: Anatoly Malofeyev

First Secretary of the Brest Regional Committee of the Communist Party of Byelorussia
- In office 5 March 1977 – 28 February 1987
- Preceded by: Vladimir Mikulich
- Succeeded by: Anatoly Zelenovsky

Member of the 28th Politburo
- In office 14 July 1990 – 29 August 1991

Full member of the 27th, 28th Central Committee
- In office 26 June 1987 – 29 August 1991

Personal details
- Born: Yefrem Yevseyevich Sokolov; 25 April 1926 Raviačyna, Horki District, Byelorussian SSR, Soviet Union (now Belarus)
- Died: 5 April 2022 (aged 95) Minsk, Belarus
- Party: Communist Party of the Soviet Union (1944–1991)

Yefrem Yevseyevich Sokolov (Russian: Ефре́м Евсе́евич Соколо́в, Belarusian: Яфрэ́м Яўсе́евіч Сакало́ў; 25 April 1926 – 5 April 2022) was a Belarusian politician, who served as a first secretary of the Communist Party of Byelorussian SSR from February 1987 to November 1990. Sokolov was a member of the 28th Politburo, elected on 14 July 1990 by the 1st Plenary Session of the 28th Central Committee.

== Biography ==
He was born into a Belarusian peasant family. From 1944 to the end of the decade he served in the Soviet Army, then worked as a driver on a farm of the Belarusian State Agricultural Academy, where he graduated from in 1956. It was here where he joined the CPSU and in 1961, he graduated from the Higher Party School in Moscow. In 1969, he became part of the apparatus of the Central Committee and was in 1977 appointed party chief for Brest. From 6 February 1987 to 30 November 1990, he was First Secretary of the Central Committee of the Communist Party of Belarus, being the last one to serve as the de facto head of the Byelorussian SSR.

From 1989–1991, he was a member of the Supreme Soviet of the Soviet Union. Since 1990, he had been a pensioner and continued political activities such as heading the Council of the Communist Party of Belarus. Sokolov's death was announced on 5 April 2022, at the age of 95.
