= Prize of the Council of Ministers of the USSR =

Soviet Union state award

Prize of the USSR Council of Ministers
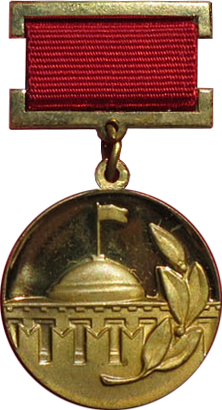
- Badge of the USSR State Prize
- Awarded for: Outstanding achievements in the development of the national economy and science
- Country: Soviet Union
- Established: 28 May 1969; 57 years ago
- Final award: 1991; 35 years ago

Precedence
- Equivalent: USSR State Prize; Lenin Komsomol Prize

Prize of the Council of Ministers of the USSR (Russian: Премия Совета Министров СССР), along with the USSR State Prize, and the Lenin Komsomol Prize, was one of the most important state awards in the Soviet Union. Established on May 28, 1969, by a joint resolution of the Central Committee of the Communist Party of the Soviet Union and the Council of Ministers of the USSR, it was awarded for outstanding achievements in the development of the national economy and science, particularly for the development and implementation of new technological solutions of significant importance for the advancement of industry, energy, and agriculture.

== History ==
The prize was awarded by the Council of Ministers of the USSR upon the recommendation of the relevant ministries and departments:

- Upon the recommendation of the State Committee for Science and Technology of the USSR (SCST) and the All-Union Central Council of Trade Unions – for the performance of comprehensive scientific research, design, engineering, and technological work in the most important areas of development of the national economy and its sectors, and for the implementation of the results of this research and work (including the implementation of scientific and technical programs) – 50 prizes in the following amounts: 5 prizes – from 30,000 to 50,000 rubles, 20 prizes – from 15,000 to 20,000 rubles, and 25 prizes – from 3,000 to 12,000 rubles;
- On the recommendation of the State Committee for Science and Technology, the All-Union Central Council of Trade Unions, and the USSR State Construction Committee—for the development of the most outstanding projects and the construction of enterprises, buildings, and structures based on these projects—60 prizes, including 15 prizes of 20,000 rubles, 20 prizes of 10,000 rubles, and 25 prizes of 5,000 rubles;
- On the recommendation of the State Committee for Science and Technology, the All-Union Central Council of Trade Unions, the USSR Ministry of Agriculture, the USSR Ministry of Land Reclamation and Water Management, and the USSR State Committee for Agricultural Technology—for the development and implementation in production of the results of the most significant scientific and technical research and discoveries of significant significance for the development of agriculture (10 prizes, including two first prizes of 20,000 rubles, three second prizes of 10,000 rubles, and five third prizes of 5,000 rubles).
- The prizes have been awarded annually since 1971. Initially, only "construction" prizes were awarded[2]. In 1976, "agricultural" prizes[3] were introduced, followed by prizes for workers in manufacturing industries[1] in 1979.

The award ceremony included a diploma, a "Laureate of the USSR Council of Ministers Prize" badge, and cash payments to the teams awarded the prize.

The award ceremony was initially timed to coincide with Builder's Day, then with Soviet Science Day.
