= Vyacheslav Kuznetsov (politician) =

Belarusian politician (born 1947)

- Вячаслаў Кузьняцоў

Acting Chairman of the Supreme Council of Belarus (Head of state of Belarus)
- In office 26 January 1994 – 28 January 1994
- Prime Minister: Vyacheslav Kebich
- Preceded by: Stanislav Shushkevich
- Succeeded by: Myechyslaw Hryb

First Deputy Chairman of the Supreme Council of Belarus
- In office 1992–1995
- Chairman: Stanislav Shushkevich; Himself (acting); Myechyslaw Hryb

Personal details
- Born: 21 February 1947 (age 79)

Vyacheslav Nikolayevich Kuznetsov (Belarusian: Вячаслаў Мікалаевіч Кузьняцоў, romanized: Viačaslaŭ Mikalajevič Kuźniacoŭ; born 21 February 1947) is a Belarusian politician and diplomat. From 1992 to 1995, he was First Deputy Chairman of the Supreme Soviet of Belarus. In particular, during 26–28 January 1994 he was Acting Chairman of the Supreme Soviet, acting between the terms of Stanislav Shushkevich and Myechyslaw Hryb. Later he served as the Ambassador of Belarus to China (1995–2000) and the non-residential ambassador to Mongolia (1998–2000).

Political offices
Preceded by Stanislau Shushkevich	Leader of Belarus (acting); 1994	Succeeded by Myechyslaw Hryb
