= Nikolai Dementey =

Former Soviet politician

- Мікалай Дземянцей; Николай Дементей

Chairman of the Supreme Soviet of the Byelorussian SSR (Note: Head of state from 19 May 1990)
- In office 19 May 1990 – 25 August 1991
- Leader: Yefrem Sokolov; Anatoly Malofeyev
- Head of government: Vyacheslav Kebich
- Preceded by: Ivan Naumenko
- Succeeded by: Stanislav Shushkevich

Chairman of the Presidium of the Supreme Soviet of the Byelorussian SSR (Head of state of the Byelorussian SSR)
- In office 28 July 1989 – 19 May 1990
- Leader: Yefrem Sokolov
- Head of government: Mikhail Kovalev; Vyacheslav Kebich
- Preceded by: Georgy Tarazevich
- Succeeded by: office disestablished

Personal details
- Born: 25 May 1930 Khotlino, Chashniki Raion, Vitebsk Oblast, Byelorussian SSR, Soviet Union
- Died: 10 July 2018 (aged 88) Zhdanovichi, Minsk district, Minsk region, Belarus
- Party: Communist Party of the Soviet Union
- Relations: Sergey Kalyakin (nephew)

Nikolai Ivanovich Dementey (Note: Belarusian: Мікалай Іванавіч Дземянцей, romanized: Mikałaj Ivanavič Dziemianciej; Russian: Николай Иванович Дементей, romanized: Nikolai Ivanovich Dementey) (25 May 1930 – 10 July 2018) was a Soviet and Belarusian politician who was chairman of the Byelorussian Supreme Soviet. A former member of the Communist Party of Byelorussia, he was replaced by Stanislav Shushkevich as chairman because he sided with the leaders of the August 1991 coup attempt against Soviet president Mikhail Gorbachev. He died on 10 July 2018, at the age of 88.
