= Economic Court of Belarus =

Top-tier court system in Belarus

The Economic Court of Belarus (Belarusian: Вышэйшы гаспадарчы суд Рэспублікі Беларусь, romanized: Vyšejšy haspadarčy sud Respubliki Bielaruś) is one of three top-tier court systems in the Republic of Belarus. The main jurisdiction of the court is dealing with economic, enterprise and monetary disputes between the national government and local governments or citizens. Cases dealing with state secrets are also heard in the court, which is based in the national capital of Minsk.
