= 1995 Belarusian referendum =

A four-question referendum was held in Belarus on 14 May 1995, alongside parliamentary elections. The four issues were the possibility of giving the Russian language equal status with Belarusian, whether new national symbols should be adopted, whether there should be economic integration with Russia and changes to the constitution that would allow early elections if Parliament systematically violated the constitution. According to official results, all four were approved by at least three-quarters of voters, with a turnout of 64.8%.

The OSCE Parliamentary Assembly stated that the referendum violated international standards. Members of the opposition claimed that the organisation of the referendum involved several serious violations of legislation, including the constitution.

== Background ==
Before becoming president in 1994, Alexander Lukashenko had tried to hold a similar referendum on state symbols in 1993 while still an MP, but had failed to obtain parliamentary support. Two months before the May 1995 referendum, Lukashenko proposed a flag design that consisted of two small bars of green and one wide bar of red. While it is not known what became of this suggestion, new designs (called "projects" in Belarus) were suggested a few days later, which were then put up to vote.

Symbol	Existing	Proposed
Coat of arms		
Flag		

On 11 April 1995 Parliament considered the questions for the referendum, approved the date, but approved only the question regarding economic integration with Russia. Lukashenko declared that he would not change his decision and would accept personal responsibility for the referendum, and left the Parliament, announcing that it would be his last discussions with Parliament in its current form. Nineteen MPs from the Belarusian Popular Front, including Zianon Pazniak, Piatro Sadoŭski and others, decided to carry out a hunger strike within Parliament, protesting against the president organizing the referendum despite the parliament's decision. They were beaten and forcibly removed by OMON. The parliamentarians sued the special forces for battery but were unsuccessful.

A conciliatory commission was called upon to resolve the conflict between the President and Parliament, and decided in favour of President Lukashenko.

== Questions ==
Voters were asked four questions:

1. Do you agree with assigning the Russian language the status equal to that of the Belarusian language?
2. Do you support the actions of the President aimed at economic integration with Russia?
3. Do you support the suggestion about the introduction of the new State flag and State Coat of Arms of the Republic of Belarus?
4. Do you agree with the necessity of the introduction of changes into the acting Constitution of the Republic of Belarus, which provide for early termination of the plenary powers of the Supreme Soviet by President of the Republic of Belarus in the case of systematical or gross violations of the Constitution?

== Results ==
Question	For		Against		Invalid/ blank	Total votes	Registered voters	Turnout	Result
Question	Votes	%	Votes	%	Invalid/ blank	Total votes	Registered voters	Turnout	Result
Giving Russian language equal status	4,017,273	86.8	613,516	13.2	192,693	4,823,482	7,445,820	64.8	Approved
Economic integration with Russia	4,020,001	87.0	602,144	13.0	201,337	4,823,482	7,445,820	64.8	Approved
New flag and coat of arms	3,622,851	78.6	988,839	21.4	211,792	4,823,482	7,445,820	64.8	Approved
President can dismiss parliament	3,749,266	81.4	857,485	18.6	216,731	4,823,482	7,445,820	64.8	Approved
Source: Nohlen & Stöver

== Reactions ==
=== Domestic ===
The opposition questioned the validity of the 1995 referendum itself. According to Siarhei Navumchyk, former parliament member, the referendum was illegal and thus its results have no legal power:

- According to the 1995 Law on national referendums (Закон аб усенародным галасаванні (рэферэндуме)), the national symbols and official language were not allowed to be questioned on a referendum at all;
- Formalities of approval of the referendum by the Parliament have not been carried out;
- The opposition had limited access to media, observers from the opposition have reported fraud in vote counts.

The opposition raised several other issues related to organisation of the referendum:

- The referendum was preceded by a heavy campaign in the overwhelmingly state-owned media that stressed the fact that the then current emblem was used by Nazi collaborators (Belarusian Central Council) during the Eastern Front. For example, the first leader of the post-Soviet Belarus, Stanislav Shushkevich, in an interview mentioned that Pahonia was portrayed by the state-owned media then as a "fascist symbol".
- Before the final announcement of the results of the referendum, Lukashenko's Chief of Administration Ivan Titenkov personally hoisted down the old flag from the Palace of Government and shredded it in public.
- The referendum question was formulated in a vague way: a number of people claimed to have voted in the belief that the "new" symbols were the ones already introduced in 1991
- The number of voters who approved the symbols, as only 48.6% of the total electorate approved of the new emblem, since over a third of the eligible voters did not express an opinion. Some claim that this failure to win a majority is a violation of the Constitution, but the imperfection and incompleteness of the Belarusian Law did not resolve the issue (in particular, the Constitution does not define the acceptance threshold).
- Finally, the BPF Party and other influential opposition parties state that the referendum, followed by mass closing of Belarusian language schools and minimizing of Belarusian language programmes on national TV and radio, has had a harmful effect on the Belarusian language and culture.

According to Mikhail Pastukhov, a former judge of the Constitutional Court of Belarus, the referendum are "invalid from the legal point of view and should be abolished". He agrees with the point that numerous issues related to national history, traditions, culture and language were put to the referendum in violation of the Constitution of the Republic of Belarus. According to Pastukhov, Pahonia and the white-red-white flag remain the state symbols of Belarus de jure.

=== International ===
The Russian State Duma issued a statement supporting the official results of the referendum.

The OSCE Parliamentary Assembly stated that the referendum violated international standards and expressed concerns over what it described as governmental control over the media, interference with the voting process, and obstacles to the opposition's activities. The US Department of State also criticized the Belarusian government over the referendum.

== Aftermath ==
The decrees about the new state flag and new coat of arms were signed by Lukashenko on 7 July 1995.
