= Stanislav Shushkevich =

Leader of Belarus from 1991 to 1994

- Станіслаў Шушкевіч; Станислав Шушкевич
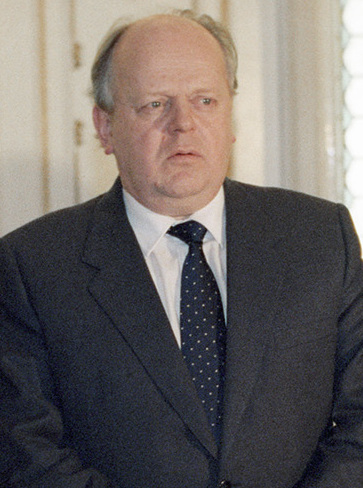
- Shushkevich in 1991

1st Chairman of the Supreme Council of Belarus (Head of state of Belarus)
- In office 18 September 1991 – 26 January 1994; Acting: 25 August – 18 September 1991
- Prime Minister: Vyacheslav Kebich
- Preceded by: Nikolai Dementey (as Chairman of the Supreme Soviet of the Byelorussian SSR)
- Succeeded by: Vyacheslav Kuznetsov (acting); Myechyslaw Hryb

Personal details
- Born: 15 December 1934 Minsk, Byelorussian SSR, Soviet Union
- Died: 3 May 2022 (aged 87) Minsk, Belarus
- Party: Communist Party of the Soviet Union (1968–1990); Belarusian Social Democratic Assembly
- Children: 2
- Education: Belarusian State University
- Profession: Scientist
- Awards: Belarusian Democratic Republic 100th Jubilee Medal (2018)

Stanislav Stanislavovich Shushkevich (Note: Belarusian: Станіслаў Станіслававіч Шушкевіч, romanized: Stanislaŭ Stanislavavič Šuškievič; Russian: Станислав Станиславович Шушкевич, romanized: Stanislav Stanislavovich Shushkevich; Polish: Stanisław Szuszkiewicz) (15 December 1934 – 3 May 2022) was a Belarusian politician and scientist who served as the first head of state of independent Belarus after it seceded from the Soviet Union, serving as the first chairman of the Supreme Soviet (also called chairman of Parliament or president) from 1991 to 1994. He supported social democratic reforms and played a key role in the creation of the Commonwealth of Independent States. He later became an opposition leader against Alexander Lukashenko.

As a scientist, he was a corresponding member of the Belarusian Academy of Sciences, Doctor in Physics and Mathematics, recipient of various state awards, professor and the author and originator of textbooks and over 150 articles and 50 inventions.

== Early life and education ==
Shushkevich's father, Stanislav Petrovich Shushkevich, pictured sometime before 1926.

Stanislav Stanislavovich Shushkevich was born on 15 December 1934 in the city of Minsk, in what was then part of the Byelorussian SSR, to a family of teachers. Stanislav's father, Stanislav Petrovich Shushkevich, was a poet who briefly wrote for the newspapers Literature and Art, Chyrvonaya Zmena, and Zvyazda before being repressed during the Great Purge in 1936 and sent into exile in the Russian SFSR. He returned to Byelorussia in 1946 after serving his sentence, before being repressed again in 1949 and sent to the Krasnoyarsk Krai, returning to Minsk only in 1956. He was fully rehabilitated in both cases in 1975. Stanislav's mother, Helena Romanowska, was an ethnic Pole of szlachta (noble) origin who was also a writer before her husband's arrest in 1936, which forced her to leave writing and become a teacher in various schools in Minsk.

Shushkevich would end up growing up on Slepianskaya Street, which was part of the Komarovka district in Minsk. Due to his father's arrest, his mother attempted to make sure that Shushkevich would not pursue humanities, and also taught him both the Belarusian and Russian languages. Shushkevich's childhood would then be significantly affected by World War II and the German occupation of Byelorussia. His family initially attempted to flee east to the Russian SFSR after the start of Operation Barbarossa, but could not do so due to the highways being damaged by the Germans near Barysaw, so they returned back to Minsk. Upon returning, Stanislav moved to live with his grandfather, Pyotr, in a village just outside of Minsk, together with his mother and grandmother. Later, a Jewish boy was resettled into the house, and although they risked execution, none of the neighbours on the street informed anyone about the boy. After the Minsk offensive and the liberation of the city, Shushkevich, who had previously been homeschooled due to the war, returned to secondary school. He graduated in 1951 with a silver medal after also having attended the young pioneer camp, Artek, in Crimea, due to the articles he had written for a local pioneer newspaper.

After graduation, he attempted to enter the Faculty of Physics and Mathematics at the Belarusian State University. According to Shushkevich in his memoir, although medalists normally did not take exams, he was required to take multiple exams because they did not want to take the son of somebody who had been repressed recently in 1949. However, after getting in, Shushkevich joined the Komsomol, the youth division of the Communist Party of the Soviet Union (CPSU), and became its organiser for his course while also working part-time at pioneer camps and tutoring. Shushkevich then decided to pursue graduate education, enrolling at the Institute of Physics of the Belarusian Academy of Sciences. During his graduate studies, he worked in the laboratory of Mikhail Yelyashevich, a renowned Belarusian physicist who authored the monograph Molecular Spectroscopy. In 1959, Shushkevich completed graduate school, but did not yet finish his dissertation, instead opting to take time off. He returned a few years later to finish his dissertation, this time at his alma mater, the Belarusian State University, in its newly founded Department of Nuclear Physics and the Peaceful Use of Atomic Energy under Alexander Pisarevsky, who had been invited from the Saint Petersburg Electrotechnical University. In 1963, Shushkevich defended his Candidate of Sciences thesis, which was within the developing field of radio electronics. His dissertation's working product, a probing radio-frequency signal, was funded by a research institute of the KGB.

== Academic career ==
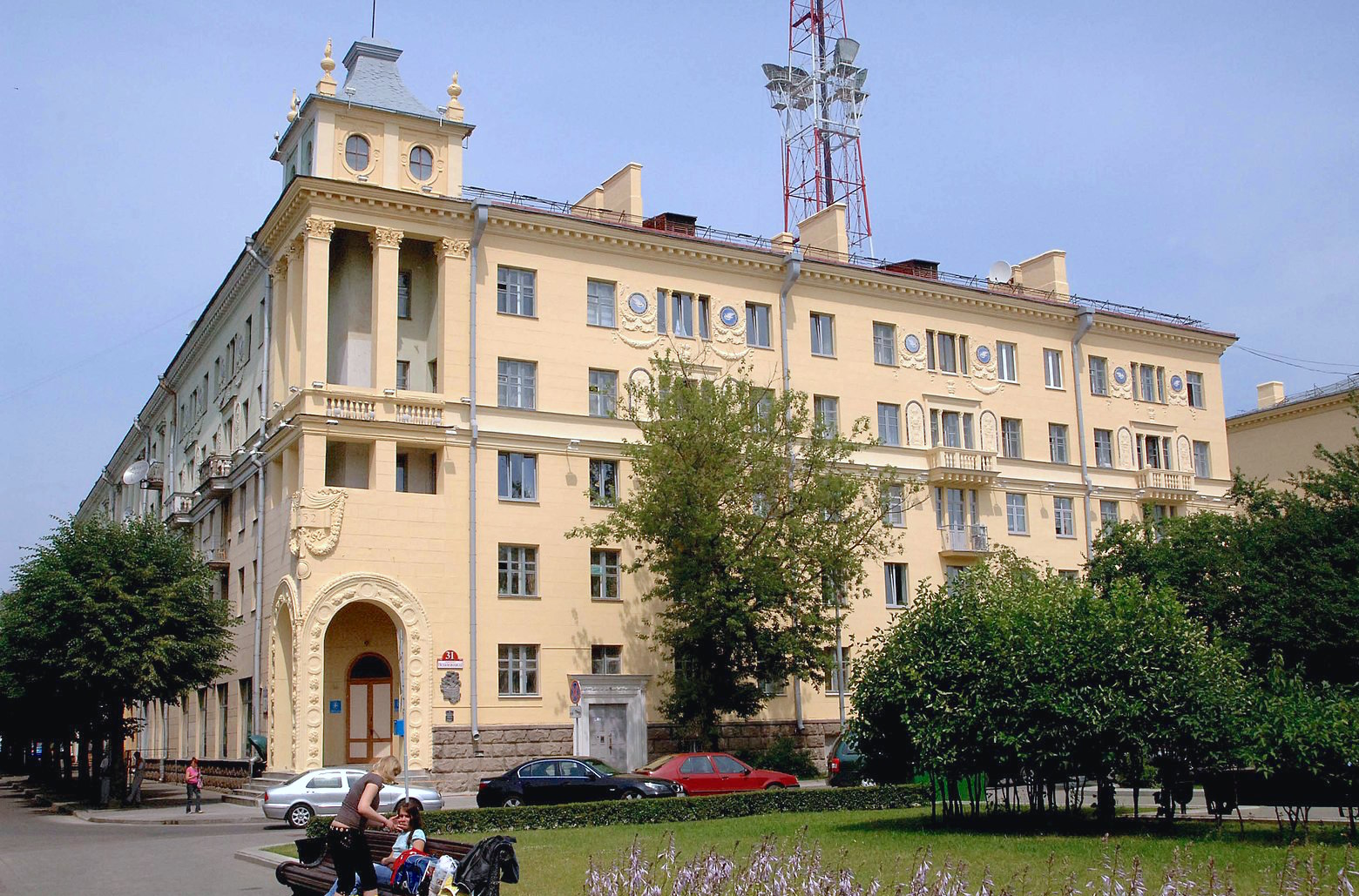
Lee Harvey Oswald's apartment in Minsk. In 1960, Shushkevich gave Oswald lessons in the Russian language, before returning to complete his Candidate of Sciences.

=== Early work at the Minsk Radio Plant (1959-1961) ===
After temporarily taking time off from graduate school in 1959, he initially worked as a junior researcher at the school. Due to the low pay, he took up a job in 1960 working at the Special Design Bureau of the Minsk Radio Plant, where he had previously obtained an internship. He worked at the plant for a little over a year, developing instruments he had been working on during his graduate studies, including a select amplifier and synchronous detector that were later developed and produced at a plant in Murom for twenty years.

While working at the plant, the party secretary, Libezin, gave Shushkevich a party errand: teach Lee Harvey Oswald, a newly arrived American to Minsk who was working at the plant as a metalworker, the Russian language. Shushkevich agreed and taught Oswald in lessons after work, although Shushkevich was not allowed to be alone with him, as a colleague, Rubenchik, had to always be there, and he was not allowed to ask about Oswald's past or his coming to the USSR either. Shushkevich later mentioned his connection with Oswald in July 1992, when he told an official of the Embassy of the US that he did not believe that Oswald was capable of the Assassination of John F. Kennedy, which he was convicted of in 1963. This is confirmed by a CIA document, RIF #104-10014-10053, which was released as part of the John F. Kennedy Assassination Records Collection Act of 1992. Shushkevich would also later recall that during the investigation into Oswald, writer and journalist Norman Mailer visited him with a team asking for Oswald's personal file. Shushkevich got permission to release the file through Eduard Shirkovsky, the last chairman of the KGB of the BSSR.

=== At MRTI (1966-1970) ===
After leaving the plant to complete his dissertation, which he did in 1963, Shushkevich was appointed prorector for research at the Minsk Radioengineering Institute (MRTI) in 1966. He was appointed to the role after the rector of BSU, Anton Sevchenko, personally arranged this through the Minsk Party Committee. While at MRTI, he became a candidate and later full member of the Communist Party of the Soviet Union in 1968. He also taught new courses there in quantum electronics and in physics, while also helping find work for the institute across Moscow and Leningrad. However, he soon came into conflict with MRTI's rector, Ivan Kovalyov, and in early 1970 requested six months' leave. In return, Shushkevich said that after the six months he would submit his doctoral dissertation, and then resign from the MRTI immediately. On 13 May 1970, he defended his dissertation to achieve his Doctor of Sciences degree in Moscow, which was entitled "Informative Parameters of Signals", and thereafter he left MRTI and immediately returned to BSU.

=== At BSU (1970-1990) ===
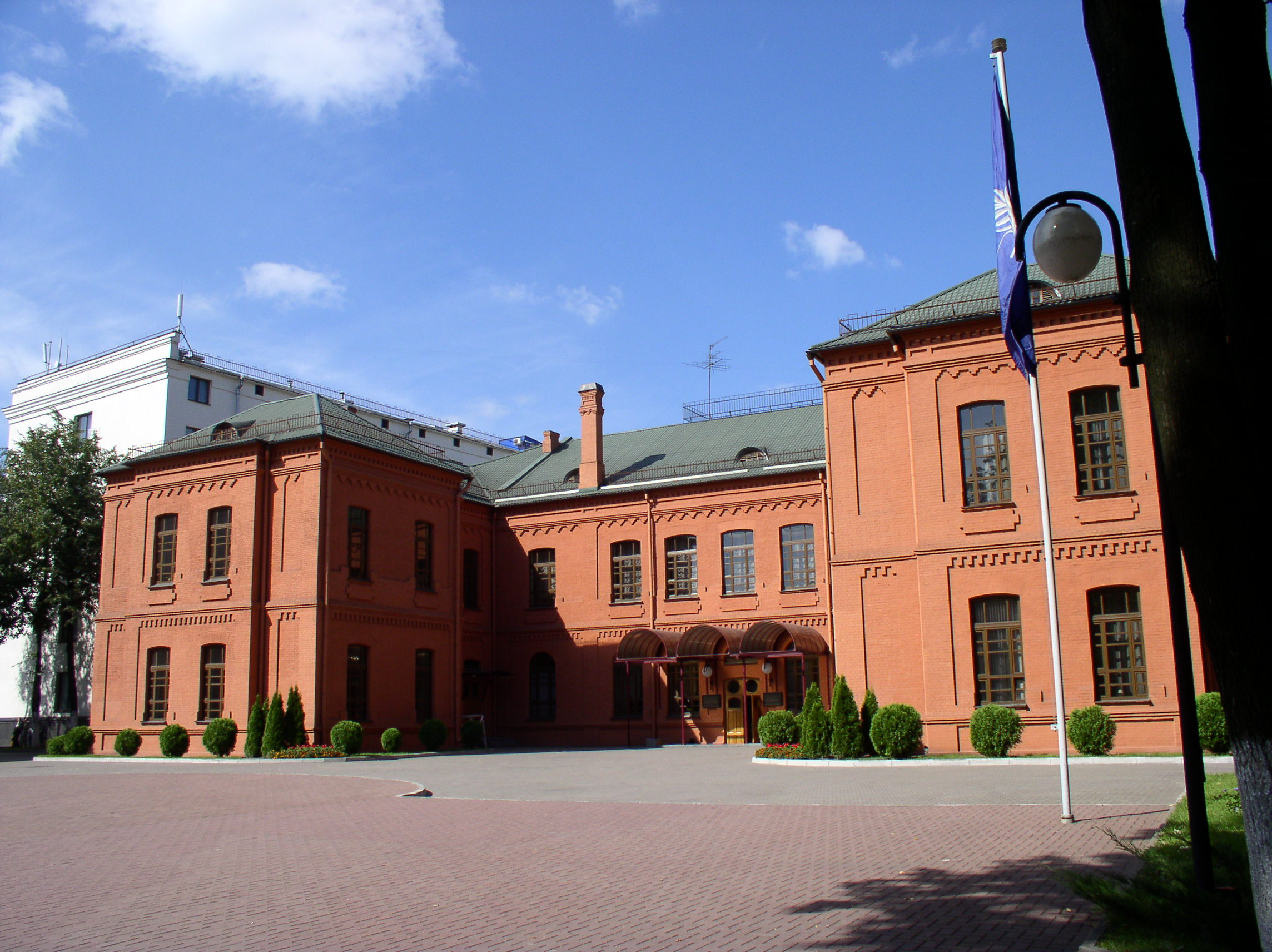
Rector's Office of the Belarusian State University. Shushkevich worked for a long time at BSU prior to entering politics.

Upon returning to BSU, Shushkevich was appointed Head of the Department of Nuclear Physics. He was also later appointed a full professor in 1972. According to Shushkevich, he was appointed head of the department because Alexander Pisarevsky had recently left to return to Leningrad, and the candidate chosen by the rector did not last, which led him to become its acting head until he was promoted to full head by competition. At BSU, his department was divided into three specialisations: nuclear physics, nuclear electronics, and nuclear power installation. The latter, installations, was not taught physically at BSU but instead at the Institute of Nuclear Energy in Sosny, because Sosny had a nuclear reactor. Shushkevich got funding for the department through contracts across the USSR, including through joint expeditions with Moscow State University to Vladivostok and Petropavlovsk-Kamchatsky. Simultaneously, during Shushkevich's time with the department, he also worked as a foreign lecturer at the Jagiellonian University, University of Jena, and University of Ljubljana. As a side job, he also co-wrote textbooks, the most famous of which was entitled "Fundamentals of Radio Electronics", which he co-wrote with Mikhail Yefimchik. It was later included in the recommendation list of the Ministry of Higher Education, and was what earned him the State Prize of the BSSR in 1986. Shortly before the award, in 1985, while continuing to head the department, he was also made prorector for research at BSU after First Secretary Mikalay Slyonkow recommended him during a visit.

=== Chernobyl disaster ===
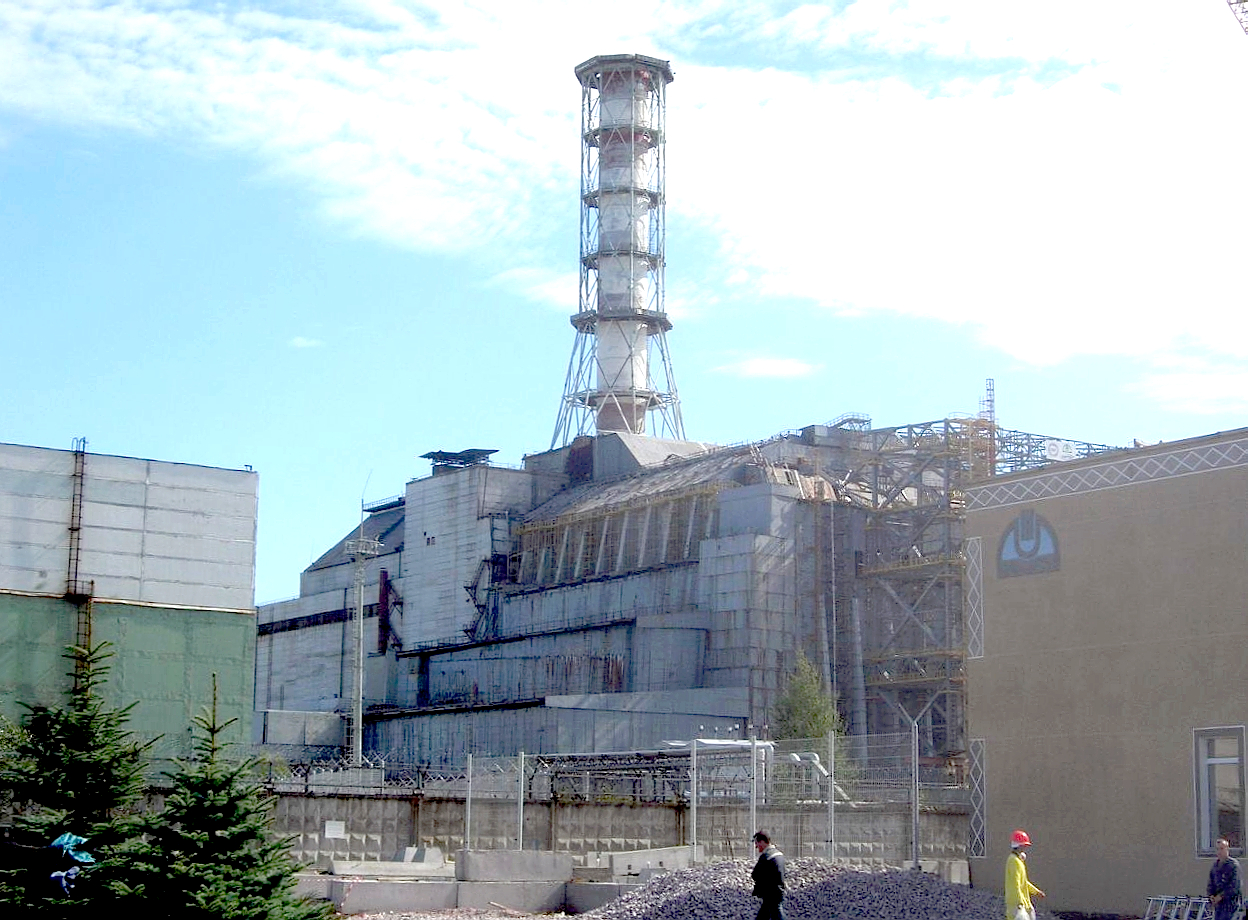
Reactor Building No. 4 of the Chernobyl Nuclear Power Plant in 2006. In subsequent interviews, Shushkevich attributed the Soviet reaction to Chernobyl as the reason he entered politics.

Shortly after the Chernobyl disaster (or Chornobyl), Shushkevich opened up his laboratories to have items tested that were received from civilians for radioactivity. He actively advertised the testing in newspapers in Minsk, which was noticed by the authorities. Shushkevich also agreed to join a state Byelorussian commission on the Chernobyl disaster, but was eventually dropped from it due to insisting that the data the commission collected be published publicly. Shushkevich then attempted to write appeals to the Council of Ministers of the USSR and the Academy of Sciences, but was met with standard replies. Eventually, the first secretary of the party committee for Minsk, Bazkho, allegedly summoned Shushkevich to his offices and accused him of spreading panic due to his advertising, although Shushkevich denied this and said he would continue to do so since he was an expert on radioactivity.

On either 14 or 15 May 1986, Mikhail Gorbachev gave a televised address about Chernobyl. Shushkevich later attributed the speech to what made him want to enter politics, as he strongly disliked that the speech gave no instructions about what to do, especially in the heavily affected Byelorussia, and he also found that parts of the speech were false. In later interviews, Shushkevich also called the speech a "disgrace", and subsequently blamed Gorbachev for thyroid cancer that was present in children in Belarus, which he attributed to Chernobyl. Additionally, he said Gorbachev had put the party's interests ahead of the health of the children by not properly informing the public.

== Communist Party career ==
=== Supreme Soviet ===
In 1989, Shushkevich finally entered politics. According to Shushkevich, he said that a group of friends from BSU had nominated him as a candidate for a people's deputy in the upcoming 1989 Soviet Union legislative election. He said that although he initially hesitated, he relented and approved his nomination. For his constituency, there were six other candidates, with Shushkevich being endorsed by the newly formed Belarusian Popular Front led by Zianon Pazniak. During the election, leaflets claiming he was a KGB informant who had informed on his father started to circulate, which Shushkevich said was ordered by the district party committee. He eventually won the elections with a majority, and thus entered the parliament.

== Presidency ==
When Supreme Soviet chairman Nikolai Dementey was ousted for his support of the August 1991 coup attempt, Shushkevich became interim speaker, and presided over Belarus voting to secede from the Soviet Union. He thus became the newly minted nation's first leader. On 18 September, Shushkevich was elected Chairman of the Supreme Soviet.

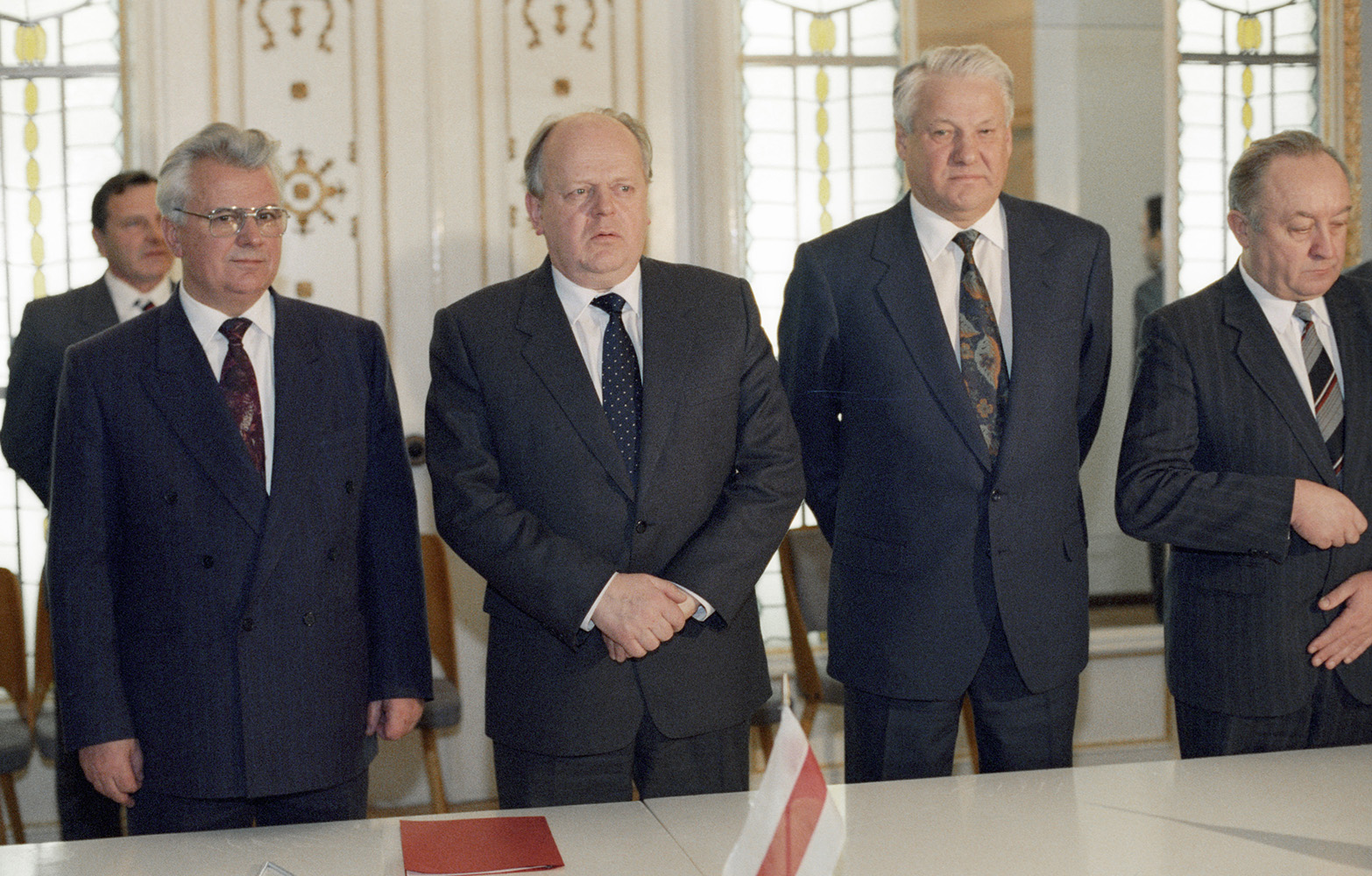
Stanislav Shushkevich at the signing of the Belavezha Accords with Leonid Kravchuk and Boris Yeltsin in 1991

On 8 December 1991, in Belavezhskaya Pushcha and together with the leaders of Russia (Boris Yeltsin) and Ukraine (Leonid Kravchuk), he signed a declaration that the Soviet Union was dissolved and replaced by the Commonwealth of Independent States; the declaration later became known as the "Belovezh Accords".

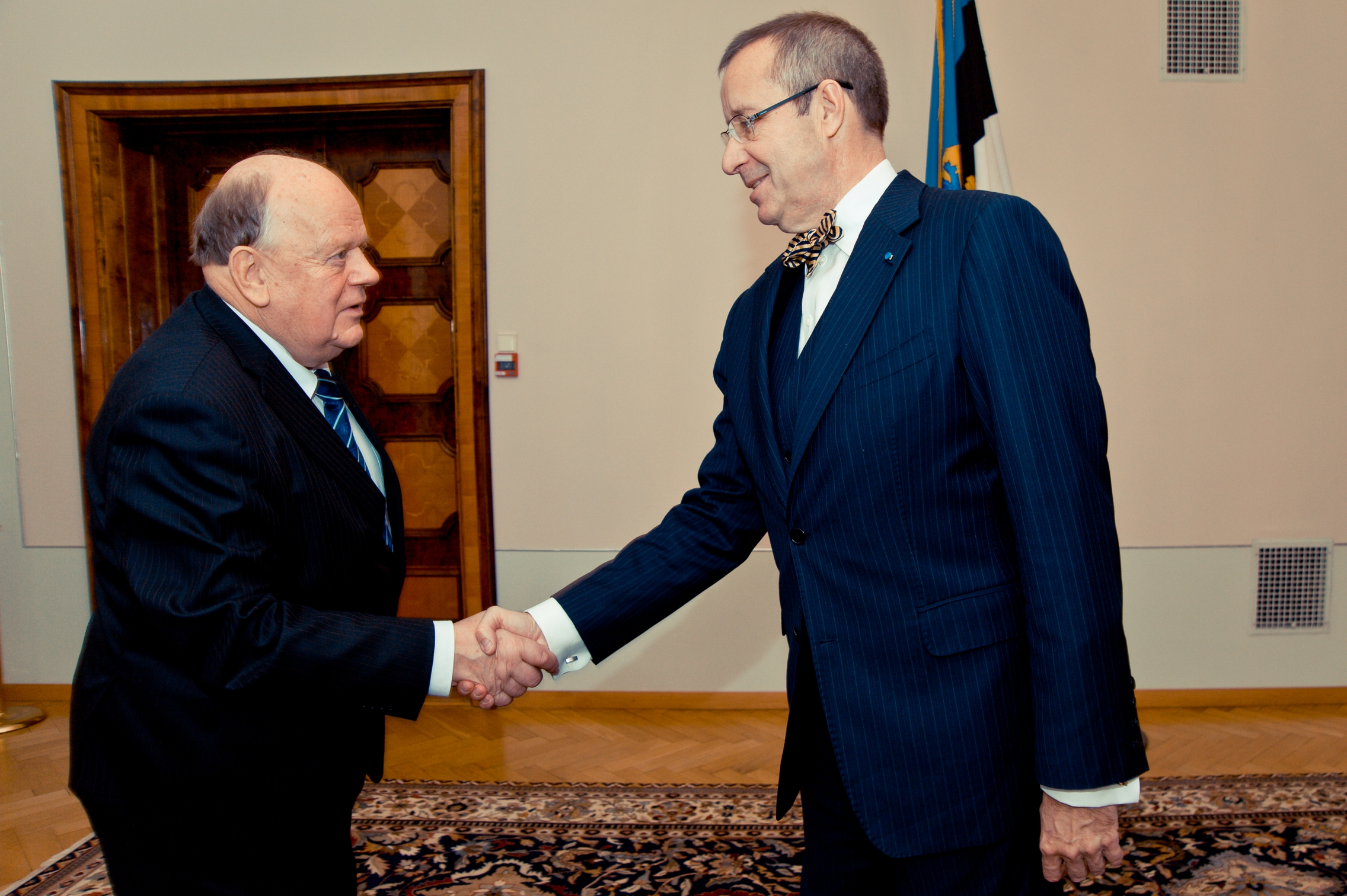
Shushkevich and President of Estonia Toomas Hendrik Ilves in 2011

Shushkevich had the vestigial Soviet nuclear arsenal (both tactical and strategic) withdrawn from Belarus, without preconditions or compensation from Russia or the West. However, other reforms became stalled due to the opposition from a hostile parliament as well as from Prime Minister Vyacheslav Kebich.

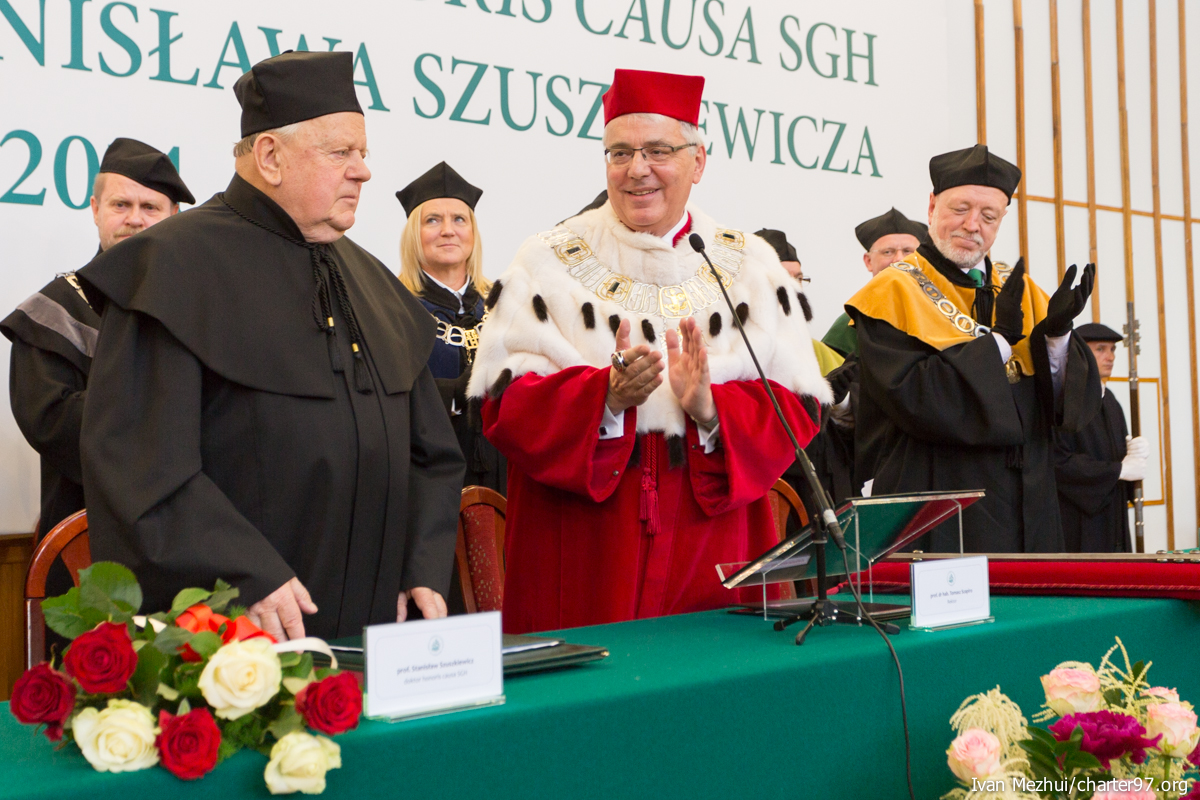
Shushkevich in Warsaw, Poland achieving Doctor Honoris Causa, 2014

In late 1993, Alexander Lukashenko, the then-chairman of the anti-corruption committee of the Belarusian parliament, accused 70 senior government officials, including Shushkevich, of corruption, including stealing state funds for personal purposes. Lukashenko's accusations forced a vote of confidence, which Shushkevich lost. Shushkevich was replaced by Vyacheslav Kuznetsov and later by Myechyslau Hryb.

== Post-presidency ==
At the 1994 Belarusian presidential election (the first one after the secession from the Soviet Union), six candidates stood, including Lukashenko, Shushkevich and Kebich, with the latter regarded as the clear favorite. In the first round Lukashenko won 45% of the vote against 17% for Kebich, 13% for Paznyak and 10% for Shushkevich.

In 2002 Shushkevich sued the Belarusian Ministry of Labor and Social Security: due to inflation, his retirement pension as a former head of state was the equivalent of US$1.80 monthly. To earn income, Shushkevich lectured extensively in foreign universities including in Poland, the United States and Asian countries.

In 2004 he attempted to participate in parliamentary elections, but was refused registration by the electoral commission.

He continued to be active in politics, heading the Belarusian Social Democratic Assembly party from 1998 until 2018.

Shushkevich also remained an outspoken critic of Lukashenko and his relationship with Russian President Vladimir Putin, feeling Lukashenko had surrendered Belarusian independence and turned the country into a "fragment of Russia". He also described Belarus' cults of personality for both leaders by mentioning that "there was a cult in Soviet times, but there was a personality. Now, there is a cult but no personality." He condemned the 2014 Russian annexation of Crimea along with the ensuing war in Donbas and 2022 Russian invasion of Ukraine.

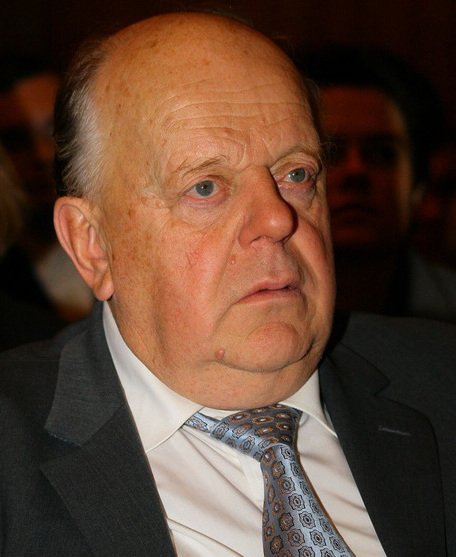
Shushkevich in 2009

In 2026, after his death, the Belarusian authorities added Stanislav Shushkevich's book "Neocommunism in Belarus: Ideology, Practice, Perspectives" to the list of extremist materials.

== Personal life ==
He was married to his wife Irina from 1976 onward. According to him, she forced him to start a healthy lifestyle. They had a son named Stanislav and daughter named Elena. Shushkevich was admitted to hospital and placed in an intensive care unit in April 2022, due to complications from COVID-19.

== Death ==
On 3 May 2022, it was reported that Shushkevich had died at the age of 87 in Minsk. His death was confirmed by his wife, Irina, according to the Voice of America. Shushkevich died of complications from COVID-19, after having been in intensive care since April.

In a statement, the opposition leader of Belarus, Svetlana Tikhanovskaya, called his death "a big loss". However, the Belarusian government under Lukashenko did not officially comment on his death, with the state news agency Belta simply releasing a chronology of his career. Previously, Lukashenko had expressed his condolences to other Belarusian leaders, such as Nikolai Slyunkov. The Prime Minister of Lithuania, Ingrida Simonyte, tweeted that he would be remembered for his help in dissolving the Soviet Union.

Shortly after his death, Irina said she hoped that a state funeral would be held for him, but that nobody had contacted her. Shushkevich's funeral ultimately took place on 7 May at the Cathedral of the Holy Name of Saint Virgin Mary on Freedom Square. Hundreds of people attended his funeral, alongside some journalists and diplomats. He was later beside his mother at the Northern Cemetery in Minsk. Traditionally, Belarusian leaders and other famous people had been buried at the Eastern Cemetery in Minsk, with former diplomat Pavel Mastukevich arguing that Shushkevich had been buried elsewhere because of political reasons.

== Honours and awards ==
- Honored Worker of Science and Technology of the BSSR (1982)
- Prize of the Council of Ministers of the USSR (1985)
- State Prize of the BSSR (1988)
- Corresponding Member of the National Academy of Sciences of Belarus (1991)
- Pylyp Orlyk International Ukrainian Prize (by the Pylyp Orlyk Foundation, 1997)
- Order of Vytautas the Great (by Lithuania, 6 July 2010)
- Truman-Reagan Medal of Freedom (by the Victims of Communism Memorial Foundation (VOC), 2012)
- Belarusian Democratic Republic 100th Jubilee Medal (2018, presented in 2019)

== Bibliography ==
- Шушкевич, Станислав (2012). Моя жизнь. Крушение и воскрешение СССР [My Life, Collapse and Resurrection of the USSR.] (in Russian). Moscow: РОСПЭН.
- Карбалевич, Валерий (2010). Александр Лукашенко: политическая биография [Alexander Lukashenko: A Political Biography] (in Russian). Партизан.
- Manaev, Oleg (2006). Президентские выборы в Беларуси: от ограниченной демократии к неограниченному авторитаризму (1994 – 2006) [Presidential Elections in Belarus: From Limited Democracy to Unlimited Authoritarianism (1994 – 2006)] (PDF) (in Russian). Vilnius: Миндаугас. Archived from the original (PDF) on 14 June 2025.
- Навумчык, Сяргей (2010). Дэпутаты Незалежнасьці [Deputies of Independence] (in Belarusian). «Беларускія Ведамасьці» Таварыства Беларускай Культуры ў Летуве.
- Wilson, Andrew (22 November 2011). Belarus: The Last European Dictatorship. Yale University Press.
- Marples, David R. (1999). Belarus: A Decentralized Nation. Harwood Academics.

Political offices
| Preceded by None | Leader of Belarus; 1991–1994 | Succeeded by Myechyslaw Hryb |
