= Vyacheslav Kebich =

Belarusian politician (1936–2020)

- Вячеслав Кебич; Вячаслаў Кебіч
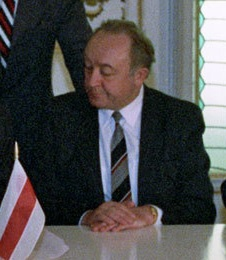
- Kebich signing the Belavezha Accords in 1991

1st Prime Minister of Belarus
- In office 19 September 1991 – 21 July 1994
- Head of state: Stanislav Shushkevich; Vyachelav Kuznetsov (acting); Myechyslaw Hryb; Alexander Lukashenko
- Preceded by: Office established; he himself as Chairman of the Council of Ministers of the Byelorussian SSR
- Succeeded by: Mikhail Chyhir

Chairman of the Council of Ministers of the Byelorussian SSR (Head of government of the Byelorussian SSR)
- In office 7 April 1990 – 19 September 1991
- Leader: Yefrem Sokolov; Anatoly Malofeyev
- Head of state: Nikolai Dementey; Stanislav Shushkevich (acting)
- Preceded by: Mikhail Kovalev
- Succeeded by: Office disestablished; he himself as Prime Minister of Belarus

Member of the National Assembly of Belarus
- In office 27 November 1996 – 16 November 2004

Personal details
- Born: 10 June 1936 Koniuszewszczyzna, Second Polish Republic (now Konyushevshchina, Belarus)
- Died: 9 December 2020 (aged 84) Minsk, Belarus
- Party: Communist Party of the Soviet Union (until 1991)
- Profession: Engineer

Vyacheslav Frantsevich Kebich (Note: Belarusian: Вячаслаў Францавіч Кебіч, romanized: Viačaslaŭ Francavič Kiebič [vʲatʂaˈslaw kˈʲɛbʲitʂ], Russian: Вячеслав Францевич Кебич) (10 June 1936 – 9 December 2020) was a Belarusian politician and the first Prime Minister of Belarus from 1991 to 1994.

== Early life and education ==
Kebich was born on 10 June 1936, in the village of Konyushevshchina (present-day Minsk region of Belarus). In 1958, he graduated from the engineering department of the Belarusian Polytechnic Institute. He studied at the Higher Party School of the Central Committee of the Communist Party of Belarus. Before his career as a politician, Kebich worked as an engineer.

== Prime Minister of Belarus ==
Kebich was the first Prime Minister of Belarus, serving from 1991 until 1994, having held the equivalent office of the Byelorussian SSR since 1990. During his tenure in office he promoted a pro-Russia stance. In early February 1994 he stated that he would 'continue campaigning for a monetary union with Russia, as I always have done and am doing now. It is not just a question of economic circumstances. We are linked by the closest spiritual bonds; we have a common history and similar cultures.' In early March he told parliament that Belarusian-Russian relations were Minsk's basic foreign policy priority, 'owing to the community of Belarusian-Russian culture, the identical interests of two fraternal peoples.'

== Other roles ==
Kebich was one of the drafters and signatories of the Belavezha Accords that effectively ended the Soviet Union and founded the Commonwealth of Independent States. He was also one of two candidates in the final running for President of Belarus in 1994 but lost to Alexander Lukashenko by a wide margin. After the election, he led the Belarusian Commerce and Financial Union and was a member of the House of Representatives.

== Death ==
Kebich died from COVID-19 on 9 December 2020 (the day after the 29th anniversary of the Belavezha Accords), during the COVID-19 pandemic in Belarus.
