= List of political office-holders in Belarus =

These are comprehensive chronological lists of political office-holders in Belarus since its first independence, in 1918, including its presidents both before and after the Soviet era, and the Soviet leaders themselves, who, unlike the Presidents, were not formal Heads of State.

== Belarusian Democratic Republic (1918–20) ==
No.	Portrait	Name (Born-Died)	Term of office			Political Party
No.	Portrait	Name (Born-Died)	Took office	Left office	Time in office	Political Party
Chairman of the Rada
1	Jan Sierada	Jan Sierada (1879–1943)	9 March 1918	19 May 1918	71 days	BSH
Vacant (19 May 1918 – 1 January 1919)
Chairman of the Provisional Revolutionary Workers-and-Peasants' Soviet Government
2	Zmicier Zhylunovich	Zmicier Zhylunovich (1887–1937)	1 January 1919	4 February 1919	34 days	Independent
Chairman of the Central Executive Committee
3	Alexander Miasnikian	Alexander Miasnikian (1886–1925)	4 February 1919	27 February 1919	23 days	CPB
Vacant (27 February 1919 – 13 December 1919)
4	Pyotra Krecheuski	Pyotra Krecheuski (1879–1928)	13 December 1919	4 February 1920	53 days	Independent

== Belarusian Democratic Republic in exile (since 1920) ==
In Vilnius to 1925, then in Prague, presently in Canada:

- Pyotra Krecheuski (November 1920 – 8 March 1928)
- Vasil Zakharka (8 March 1928 – 6 March 1943)
- Mikola Abramchyk (6 March 1943 – 29 May 1970)
- Vintsent Zhuk-Hryshkyevich (May 1970 – November 1982)
- Jazep Sazhych (November 1982 – 1997)
- Barys Rahula (1997 – 22 April 2005)
- Ivonka Survilla (1997–present)

== Lithuanian–Byelorussian Soviet Socialist Republic (1919–20) ==
=== Chairman of the Central Executive Committee ===
No.	Portrait	Name (Born-Died)	Term of office			Political Party
No.	Portrait	Name (Born-Died)	Took office	Left office	Time in office	Political Party
1	Kazimierz Cichowski	Kazimierz Cichowski (1887–1937)	27 February 1919	31 July 1920	1 year, 155 days	LBSSR

== Byelorussian Soviet Socialist Republic (1920–91) ==
=== First Secretary of the Communist Party ===
No.	Portrait	Name (Born-Died)	Term of office			Political Party
No.	Portrait	Name (Born-Died)	Took office	Left office	Time in office	Political Party
Executive Secretary of the Byelorussian Communist Party
5	Vilhelm Knorin	Vilhelm Knorin (1890–1939)	9 August 1920	30 December 1922	2 years, 143 days	CPB
6	Waclaw Bogucki	Waclaw Bogucki (1884–1937)	30 December 1922	12 February 1924	1 year, 44 days	CPB
7	Aleksandr Osatkin-Vladimirsky	Aleksandr Osatkin-Vladimirsky (1885–1937)	12 February 1924	29 September 1924	199 days	CPB
8	Alexander Krinitsky	Alexander Krinitsky (1894–1937)	13 May 1924	22 December 1925	1 year, 223 days	CPB
First Secretary of the Byelorussian Communist Party
9	Nikolay Goloded	Nikolay Goloded (1894–1937)	22 December 1925	7 May 1927	1 year, 136 days	CPB
(5)	Vilhelm Knorin	Vilhelm Knorin (1890–1939)	7 May 1927	4 December 1928	211 days	CPB
10	Yan Gamarnik	Yan Gamarnik (1894–1937)	4 December 1928	3 January 1930	1 year, 30 days	CPB
11	Konstantin Gey	Konstantin Gey (1896–1937)	3 January 1930	18 January 1932	2 years, 15 days	CPB
12	Nikolay Gikalo	Nikolay Gikalo (1897–1938)	18 January 1932	18 March 1937	5 years, 59 days	CPB
13	Vasily Sharangovich	Vasily Sharangovich (1897–1938)	18 March 1937	17 July 1937	121 days	CPB
–	Yakov Yakovlev	Yakov Yakovlev (1897–1938); Acting	17 July 1937	8 August 1937	22 days	CPB
14	Aleksei Volkov	Aleksei Volkov (1890–1942)	11 August 1937	18 June 1938	311 days	CPB
15	Panteleimon Ponomarenko	Panteleimon Ponomarenko (1902–1984)	18 June 1938	7 March 1947	8 years, 262 days	CPB
16	Nikolai Gusarov	Nikolai Gusarov (1905–1985)	7 March 1947	31 May 1950	3 years, 85 days	CPB
17	Nikolai Patolichev	Nikolai Patolichev (1908–1989)	31 May 1950	28 July 1956	6 years, 58 days	CPB
18	Kirill Mazurov	Kirill Mazurov (1914–1989)	28 July 1956	30 March 1965	8 years, 245 days	CPB
19	Pyotr Masherov	Pyotr Masherov (1919–1980)	30 March 1965	4 October 1980 †	15 years, 158 days	CPB
–	Vladimir Brovikov	Vladimir Brovikov (1931–1992); Acting	4 October 1980	16 October 1980	12 days	CPB
20	Tikhon Kiselyov	Tikhon Kiselyov (1917–1983)	16 October 1980	11 January 1983 †	2 years, 117 days	CPB
–	Vladimir Brovikov	Vladimir Brovikov (1931–1992); Acting	11 January 1983	13 January 1983	2 days	CPB
21	Nikolay Slyunkov	Nikolay Slyunkov (1929–2022)	13 January 1983	6 February 1987	4 years, 24 days	CPB
22	Yefrem Sokolov	Yefrem Sokolov (1926–2022)	6 February 1987	28 July 1990	3 years, 172 days	CPB

=== Chairman of the Supreme Soviet (1990–1991) ===
No.	Portrait	Name (Born-Died)	Term of office			Political Party
No.	Portrait	Name (Born-Died)	Took office	Left office	Time in office	Political Party
23	Nikolai Dementey	Nikolai Dementey (1930–2018)	18 May 1990	25 August 1991	1 year, 99 days	CPB
–	Stanislav Shushkevich	Stanislav Shushkevich (1934–2022)	25 August 1991	19 September 1991	25 days	Independent

== Republic of Belarus (from 1991) ==
=== Chairman of the Supreme Council (1991–1994) ===
No.	Portrait	Name (Born-Died)	Term of office			Political Party
No.	Portrait	Name (Born-Died)	Took office	Left office	Time in office	Political Party
24	Stanislav Shushkevich	Stanislav Shushkevich (1934–2022)	19 September 1991	26 January 1994	2 years, 129 days	Independent
–	Vyacheslav Kuznetsov	Vyacheslav Kuznetsov (born 1947); Acting	26 January 1994	28 January 1994	2 days	Independent
–	Myechyslaw Hryb	Myechyslaw Hryb (born 1938); Acting	28 January 1994	20 July 1994	173 days	Independent

=== President of Belarus (1994–present) ===
No.	Portrait	Name (Born-Died)	Term of office			Political Party	Election
No.	Portrait	Name (Born-Died)	Took office	Left office	Time in office	Political Party	Election
25	Alexander Lukashenko	Alexander Lukashenko (born 1954)	20 July 1994	Incumbent (Note: A number of countries do not recognize Lukashenko as the legitimate president of Belarus since the 2020 Belarusian presidential election.)	32 years, 83 days	Independent	1994; 2001; 2006; 2010; 2015; 2020; 2025

== See also ==
- Government of Belarus
