= Supreme Council of Belarus =

Unicameral legislature of Belarus from 1991 to 1996

Supreme Council of the Republic of Belarus Вярхоўны Савет Рэспублікі Беларусь
- Republic of Belarus
- Coats of arms of Belarus (1991–1995 and 1995–1996)

Type
- Type: Unicameral

History
- Established: 1991
- Disbanded: 1996
- Preceded by: Supreme Soviet of the Byelorussian SSR
- Succeeded by: National Assembly of Belarus
- Seats: 260

Elections
- Last election: 14 May 1995

Meeting place
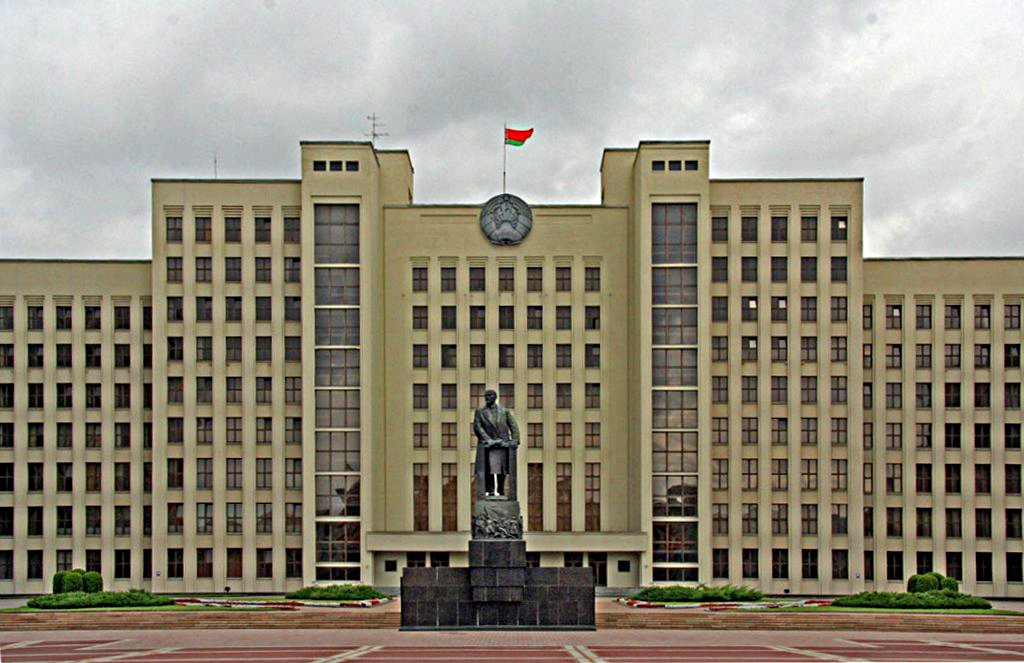
- Government House, Minsk

The Supreme Council of the Republic of Belarus (Belarusian: Вярхоўны Савет Рэспублікі Беларусь, romanized: Viarchoŭny Saviet Respubliki Bielaruś) (Note: Sometimes translated as Supreme Soviet of the Republic of Belarus) was the unicameral legislature of Belarus between 1991 and 1996.

It was essentially a continuation of the Supreme Soviet of the Byelorussian SSR of 1938–1991 immediately after the Soviet Union's collapse in 1991, which in its turn was the successor of both the All-Byelorussian Congress of Soviets (1919–1937) and its Central Executive Committee (1920–1938), and all of which had been the highest organs of state power in Belarus during 1920–1990. During 1990–1996 it functioned as a permanent parliament.

From 1991 to 1994, the chairman of the Supreme Council was the de facto head of state of Belarus, and the post was considered equivalent to that of president in a parliamentary republic.

Since 1994 the head of state has been the President of Belarus, with the executive power being the Council of Ministers of Belarus. Since 1996, the National Assembly of Belarus has been the bicameral legislature of Belarus and the President gained executive power as well as being the de facto head of government.

== Chairmen of the Supreme Council ==
Stanislaw Shushkevich	September 18, 1991 – January 26, 1994
Vyachaslaw Kuznyatsow (acting)	January 26, 1994 – January 28, 1994
Myechyslaw Hryb	January 28, 1994 – January 10, 1996
Syamyon Sharetski	January 10, 1996 – November 28, 1996

== Convocations ==
- 12th Belarusian Supreme Council
- 13th Belarusian Supreme Council
