= 1995–1996 Belarusian constitutional crisis =

Date	11 April 1995 – 27 November 1996 (1 year, 7 months, 2 weeks and 2 days)
Location	Minsk, Belarus
Result	Presidential victory: Dissolution of the Supreme Council of Belarus following the falsified 1996 referendum; Belarus becomes an authoritarian state

Belligerents
(Belarus) Parliamentary forces: Supreme Council of Belarus; Supreme Court of Belarus; Constitutional Court of Belarus; Prime Minister of Belarus (since November 1996); Supported by: Poland; Lithuania	Presidential forces: (Belarus) Presidential Administration; Prime Minister of Belarus (until November 1996); Internal Troops; Police; OMON; Supported by: Russia

Commanders and leaders
(Belarus) Myechyslaw Hryb (until January 1996) (Belarus) Syamyon Sharetski (since January 1996) (Belarus) Zianon Pazniak (Belarus) Vladimir Karavay (Belarus) Valery Tikhinya (Belarus) Mikhail Chyhir (since November 1996) (Belarus) Uładzimir Hančaryk	Alexander Lukashenko (Belarus) Mikhail Chyhir (until November 1996) (Belarus) Sergey Ling (Belarus) Vladimir Yermoshin (Belarus) Vladimir Konoplev

Political support
(Belarus) Belarusian opposition; Belarusian Party of Communists; Belarusian Agrarian Party; United Civic Party; Belarusian Social Democratic Assembly; Belarusian Labour Party; Belarusian Green Party; People's Accord Party; Civic Party; Belarusian Popular Front; Federation of Trade Unions of Belarus; Belarus Free Trade Union	(Belarus) Union State supporters Minsk Metro owners

Belarusian Supreme Council was dominated by anti-Lukashenko opposition in 1995–1996.

The 1995–1996 Belarusian constitutional crisis was a confrontation between a Belarusian President Alexander Lukashenko and an opposition-dominated Supreme Council of Belarus. During that period, Lukashenko attempted to strengthen his powers and weaken parliamentary and judiciary control of his office.

== 1995 ==
=== Referendum proposal ===
==== March-April 1995 ====
Lukashenko wanted to make a referendum in 1995 that will give him a right to dissolve a parliament, change Belarusian state symbols to those similar to Byelorussian Soviet Socialist Republic, introduce Russian language as a second state language alongside Belarusian, and increase integration with Russia. He also initially wanted a question to renounce Belavezha Accords. At that time, according to the law, the president of the country could not announce referendums, but only initiate them for consideration by the Supreme Council. On March 18, 1995, the newspaper "Zvyazda" published appeals to Lukashenko, allegedly signed by 74 deputies of the Supreme Council (out of 238 deputies). At the same time, one of the signatories, deputy Boris Savitsky, stated at a session of the Supreme Council that he did not consent to his signature being placed on the appeal. The first appeal concerned changing state symbols, the second seeking to grant Russian the status of a second state language. The first appeal stated that the Vytis and the white-red-white flag, used by "Hitler's minions," take on particular significance on the eve of the 50th anniversary of victory in the German-Soviet War and are negatively perceived by society. "Considering that Belarus is a sovereign state, it is inappropriate for it to adopt the coat of arms and flag, even of a friendly but different sovereign state – Lithuania, which were approved by parliament much earlier than our republic." The second letter claimed that the language law allegedly violates the constitution and other international instruments, and restricts the rights of citizens.

On April 7, 1995, the Union of Writers of Belarus appealed to the Supreme Council to defend the language and symbols.

On March 23 and 24, the Supreme Council discussed the issues proposed by Lukashenko for the referendum. Among the arguments against the referendum, the chairman of the parliamentary committee on legislation, Dmitry Bulakhov, noted that, according to current law, amendments and additions to the Constitution cannot be made during the last six months of the term of office of the Supreme Council, and issues that violate the inalienable rights of the people to sovereign national statehood, state guarantees of the existence of the Belarusian national culture and language, cannot be submitted to a referendum. The issue of language status fell into this category, and therefore submitting it to a referendum was unconstitutional. In response, Deputy Chairman of the State Construction Commission Mikhail Kazyukhits, while supporting Lukashenko's proposal, essentially stated that the law could be ignored if necessary. Lukashenko himself, present during the discussion, continued to maintain in his speech that he was not breaking the law, but did not provide any legal arguments, and in the event that the referendum was not held, he practically threatened to dissolve parliament.

==== Parliamentary vote ====
On April 10, discussions on the referendum continued. The proposed questions changed several times. In their speeches, opposition MPs continued to draw attention to the fact that, according to the law, issues of the status of the language and national symbols cannot be submitted to a referendum. Siarhei Navumchyk recalls that at that time the deputies, among whom were many former members of the nomenklatura (leaders of the Soviet administration) and communists, could vote for a referendum on questions about language and symbols. Back in the autumn of 1993, due to the intensification of pro-Russian sentiments, the majority of the members of the Constitutional Committee of the Supreme Council voted to remove from the text of the Constitution of Belarus the mention of the sources of Belarusian statehood – not only the Grand Duchy of Lithuania and the Belarusian People's Republic, but also the Belarusian SSR – which was supported by the majority of the corps of deputies. To prevent such a development, on April 10 opposition MPs agreed to take radical action.

On April 11, 1995, the Supreme Council of the Republic of Belarus, at its meeting in the Oval Hall of the Government House, opened its session with speeches by deputies Mikalay Kryzhanavsky, Yury Belensky, and Zianon Pazniak. They declared the referendum on language and symbols illegal and violating the constitution. Opposition MPs then went on a hunger strike, left their seats in the middle of the Oval Hall, and sat in front of the presidium, near the lectern.

Chairman of the Supreme Council Myechyslaw Hryb announced that according to the law, the parliament must consider the president's proposal and to vote on it. Gennady Moiseyev then addressed the deputies, who was outraged that the day before state television had broadcast agitation in favor of Lukashenko's new proposals, but did not give the floor to any of the deputies As a result of the vote on the questions:

- Do you agree with assigning the Russian language the status equal to that of the Belarusian language? – 124 voted in favour (from 238) with 152 required for approval
- Do you support the suggestion about the introduction of the new State flag and State Coat of Arms of the Republic of Belarus? Yes or no? – 150 MPs supported it (two votes short)
- Do you agree with the necessity of the introduction of changes into the acting Constitution of the Republic of Belarus, which provide for early termination of the plenary powers of the Supreme Soviet by President of the Republic of Belarus in the case of systematical or gross violations of the Constitution? – only 86 deputies voted, almost half of the required number.
- Do you support the actions of the President aimed at economic integration with Russia? – the question received the required number of votes – 180

Thus, three of the four questions proposed by Lukashenko were not adopted. In response, Lukashenko emotionally stated that the issues (language, symbolism, the right to dissolve parliament and integration with Russia) allegedly form an "integral complex" which the MPs "violated" by considering these issues separately

=== "Night in the Parliament" ===
In the evening, Halina Syamdzianova received information that force might be used against the hunger strikers. Zianon Pazniak asked the chairman of the Supreme Council, Myechyslaw Hryb, to provide them with protection, stating that the KGB leadership had allegedly promised to send its men.

After 6:00 p.m., the presidential guard demanded that journalists leave the room. Only Radio Liberty correspondent Alena Radkevich remained. At 10:10 p.m., Lukashenko-controlled state television broadcast a report on the starving deputies, including the words: "The president tried to resolve the issue peacefully, but exhausted all options."

At 11:00 PM, Mikhail Tesavets, head of the Security Department, entered the Oval Office with Vyacheslav Korolev, head of the Presidential Security Service. They were accompanied by dozens of people in military and police uniforms, as well as men with heavy builds in leather jackets. Tesavets said they had received a telephone notification of a bomb threat in the parliament building and were asked to leave the building, as an evacuation was underway. Tesavets cited Hryb's order to leave the chamber. However, the MPs contacted the chairman and learned that Hryb had not issued such an order. Tesavets then ordered his aides to forcibly remove the MPs from the chamber, but they refused when they saw the MPs' ID cards and were told they would face criminal liability for violating parliamentary immunity. At that moment, two cameramen appeared on the balcony above the Oval Office and began filming everything. Tesavets and Korolev decided to try to get at least one of the deputies out of their seats—first they pulled Boris Guntar out of his chair, then Igor Hermenchuk, but the deputies held hands, and the plan failed.

While the dust was settling, a group of bomb disposal experts led by a colonel, equipped with specialized equipment and dogs, searched the Oval Office for a bomb.

At 11:00 PM, the guards entered the room, approached journalist Radkevycz, who had been writing a report at the Chairman of the Supreme Council's table (because that's where the lamp was), and removed the cassette from the recorder. A few minutes later, Radkevycz herself was escorted from the room, taken to a security room, and interrogated there.

Several deputies descended to the first floor because all the doors were open. Police advised them to go outside to the square, with no guarantee of return. The deputies even managed to give an interview through the closed glass doors to journalists waiting for them from the street. They said that a motorcade had entered the courtyard of the Government Palace and that the lights had come on in the presidential chambers. Siarhei Navumchyk and Aleh Trusaŭ claim to have seen the presidential limousine in the courtyard and believe that Lukashenko himself arrived at the government building at that time.

At 12:41 a.m. on April 12, sappers inspected the building, and the report was signed on behalf of the deputies by Aleh Trusau and Boris Gunther.

At 2:35 a.m., Valentin Golubev, who had opened the door to the lobby earlier, noticed men in camouflage. He shouted, "Come on! Soldiers with machine guns and masks!". Golubev said that in the hall, lined up in several rows, were soldiers in uniforms, with weapons, and wearing gas masks, "a total of five or six hundred people." The hungry people jumped up and sat down in the right sector of the Presidium of the Supreme Council. People with video cameras (at least two) appeared on the balconies of the meeting room.

At 2:48 a.m., Tsezavets, Korolev, and an unknown man in a paramilitary uniform (Naumchik later identified him as Yuri Barodzich, then commander of Alpha and later head of Lukashenko's Security Service) entered the room. The deputies were given five minutes to leave the room, after which a company of officers left. The deputies agreed that if they were removed from the chamber, they would resist: they would grab each other, and if the attackers managed to break the chain, they would try to tear off their masks and cling to the tables and chairs as tightly as they could.

At 2:51 a.m., all the doors opened simultaneously, the lights came on in the room, and about 200 people in black masks and dark jumpsuits rushed in. They were followed by special forces soldiers wearing helmets, respirators and carrying batons, and machine guns were placed around the room.

Belenki later said that one of the first attackers in black somersaulted in the air and kicked Pazniak in the chest. Hermianczuk recalled: "They attacked from all sides. First, they pulled out those sitting on the edge. Three of them immediately jumped on Pazniak, started choking him, turning his head away, and putting their fingers in his eyes." Pazniak and Hermianczuk managed to rip off the masks of several attackers. The opposition leader was beaten particularly severely, as Navumchik later recalled: "One of the 'gorillas' kicked him in the chest, another turned his head and pressed his eyes. Then, as they led him away, they beat Pazniak against a wall. A forensic examination revealed five injuries of varying severity."

Lyavon Barshchewski recalled that his arms were twisted behind his back, "so that my chin was below my knees. I was dragged along a semicircle of the cross aisle that ran along the back row of replacement chairs. A chain of soldiers in camouflage and with full ammunition stood by the chairs, each of them trying to hit me in the face with their boots.

According to Lyavon Barshchevsky's memoirs: "They could have just led me away or taken me away. But they beat me very hard. They kicked me in the face with their shoes, broke my arms, beat me with batons, and aimed machine guns at me, which was completely unnecessary. We were unarmed." According to MP Golubev: "I remember the moment when two men twisted my arms so that I hit my head on the floor while standing. At that moment, I was hit in the spine with a stick, and my legs buckled. They simply dragged me. My head was still functioning, but I could no longer resist."

All the MPs were severely beaten while being led out or carried out of the Supreme Council. They were then thrown into police cars. In the police cars, the MPs were asked for their addresses but ordered to take them to the prosecutor's office. Two on-duty prosecutors were summoned during the night and testified. An ambulance also arrived at the scene.

At 4 a.m., all the deputies, scattered across Minsk, gathered near the Kastrichnitsky Hotel and headed to the "medical mission," located nearby on Krasnoarmeyskaya Street. Journalists also arrived.

==== 12 April ====
At 6 a.m., after a medical examination, the beaten MPs reported the incident to Myechyslaw Hryb. He received them in his office, along with Deputy Speaker Ivan Bambiza and Prosecutor General Vasyl Szaladonov. The Prosecutor General stated that he had already been informed of the MPs' midnight appeal to the Prosecutor General's Office and that he was initiating criminal proceedings (a meeting of the Prosecutor General's Office board was later held on the matter). According to Navumchik, Hryb called what had happened a state crime and ordered an urgent meeting of the Presidium of the Supreme Council.

Members of the Presidium of the Supreme Council were shocked by the events of that night. The chairman of the parliamentary committee on ecology, Boris Savitsky, stated that after the beating of the deputies in the Supreme Council building, only two options remained: either to initiate the procedure for Lukashenko's resignation or his solution. "Belarus has never been so close to the brink of civil war," Hryb said. He suggested discussing the situation at a meeting of the Supreme Council.

Meanwhile, a small group of protesters began to gather near the Government Palace, and police forced them out of the metro and onto the square. Police refused to let the beaten deputies into the Government Palace, claiming that entry was permitted only by lists and that their names were not listed there. Prosecutor General Shaladonov, who arrived at the scene, was also denied entry. After grouping together, the deputies managed to break through the police cordon and enter the Oval Hall.

The MPs (who were not representatives of the opposition BNF) immediately stated that after the events of the night it was impossible to hold the meeting in the Government House controlled by Lukashenko, and not in the building of the Supreme Council. Hryb then went to Lukashenko to learn about the circumstances of the incident and try to resolve the conflict. As a result, a meeting began in the Government House building. After lunch, Defense Minister Anatoly Kostenko and the building's security chief, Mikhail Tsezavets, approached the deputies to present their version of events. They stated that, on Lukashenko's orders, they had provided security for the deputies present in the building, who were allegedly simply escorted out of the Government House and taken home.

In response, Ales Shut lifted his shirt and showed the blood stains from the batons. In response, some MPs shouted, "You haven't been given enough!" Navumchik claims in his memoirs that it was the former chairman of the Supreme Soviet of the BSSR, Nikolai Dementey, who shouted this.

Valentin Golubev described how people were beaten and demanded to see the footage from two video cameras. Hryb replied that all the deputies would definitely see it and that Lukashenko had personally promised him this. A recess was then announced until 4:00 p.m., at which point Lukashenko promised to meet the deputies. At 4:00 p.m., opposition deputies declared there was nothing left to do in the Government Building and moved the hunger strike to the Supreme Council, which is not part of the presidential administration.

During his speech, Lukashenko attempted to prove that opposition MPs were to blame for "destabilizing the situation" and that they had done nothing to harm the MPs—on the contrary, they had saved their lives. The MPs themselves did not starve, but ate and even drank at night: "When Tesovets called me with tears in his eyes around 12 o'clock at night and said, 'Alexander Grigorievich, something's wrong, they've taken out knives, they've taken out blades. First they say, 'We'll open our veins, cut off our heads, cut you off, we'll pour blood all over the place.' Well, I'm sorry, such threats in the presidential residence are excessive."

That same day, demoralized by Lukashenko's pressure and Hryb's weak will, MPs voted to ratify the Treaty on Bilateral Belarusian-Russian Relations. Then, on the evening of April 12, MPs from the opposition BNF adopted a declaration ending their political hunger strike.

==== 13 April ====
On April 13, deputies, without the participation of the opposition BNF faction, quickly adopted the law "On patents for plant varieties" and ratified the Agreement between Belarus and Russia "On joint actions for the protection of the state border of the Republic of Belarus". At that time, the current deputies of the Supreme Council adopted a resolution to hold a referendum, which was a violation of the procedure. It was scheduled for 14 May 1995, but a repeat vote was not permitted in accordance with the procedure, and furthermore, in accordance with the 1994 Constitution of Belarus, it was prohibited to introduce changes and additions to the document in the last six months of the parliamentary term.

In accordance with Resolution No. 3728-XII "On holding a republican referendum on issues proposed by the President of the Republic of Belarus and measures to ensure it", the following questions were included in the ballot:

1. Do you agree with assigning the Russian language the status equal to that of the Belarusian language?
2. Do you support the actions of the President aimed at economic integration with Russia?
3. Do you support the suggestion about the introduction of the new State flag and State Coat of Arms of the Republic of Belarus?
4. Do you agree with the necessity of the introduction of changes into the acting Constitution of the Republic of Belarus, which provide for early termination of the plenary powers of the Supreme Soviet by President of the Republic of Belarus in the case of systematical or gross violations of the Constitution?

The first, second and third questions were subject to a mandatory referendum, the decision of which is final, while the fourth question was subject to a consultative decision, which is of a recommendatory nature.

Doctor of Law Mikhail Pastukhov, who served as a Constitutional Court judge in 1995, believes that the very fact that "people in camouflage uniforms" used physical force against deputies, even inside the parliament building, undermines the legality of the Supreme Council's resolution to call the referendum, as it was adopted under duress. The mere introduction of armed individuals into parliament and the assault on deputies can be classified as a seizure of power by force.

One of the last laws passed on that day was to establish November 7 (the day of the October Revolution) as a national holiday.

That day, the meeting concluded in the cafeteria. Navumchik quotes excerpts from the transcript:

Lukashenko: "...I will now invite this entire room at the state's expense. Do you hear that? I have the right. And we will drink both a hundred and two hundred grams..."

Hryb: "Thank you. You are all expected in the cafeteria."

=== Minsk Metro strike ===
==== August 1995 ====
On 15 August 1995, Belarusian trolleybus drivers began a strike. Two days later, workers workers, including the machinists from the Maskoŭskaja line, of the Minsk Metro joined the resistance. A day later, the authorities paid the striking trolleybus drivers, so they could suppress the metro strike. On 19 August, police and Ministry of Internal Affairs troops surrounded the union's bureau. On 20 August, President Lukashenko condemned the strike leaders in the TV programme "Resonance". He claimed that the Belarus Free Trade Union, supported by the "nationalist forces" from the Belarusian Popular Front, cooperated with Polish and American trade unions. On 21 August, striking workers gathered in the bureau again. Police detained 23 people this day, including union leaders Vladimir Makarchuk and Nikolay Kanach and Belarusian Popular Front politician Sergei Antonchik. 56 to 58 employees were later fired.

== 1996 ==
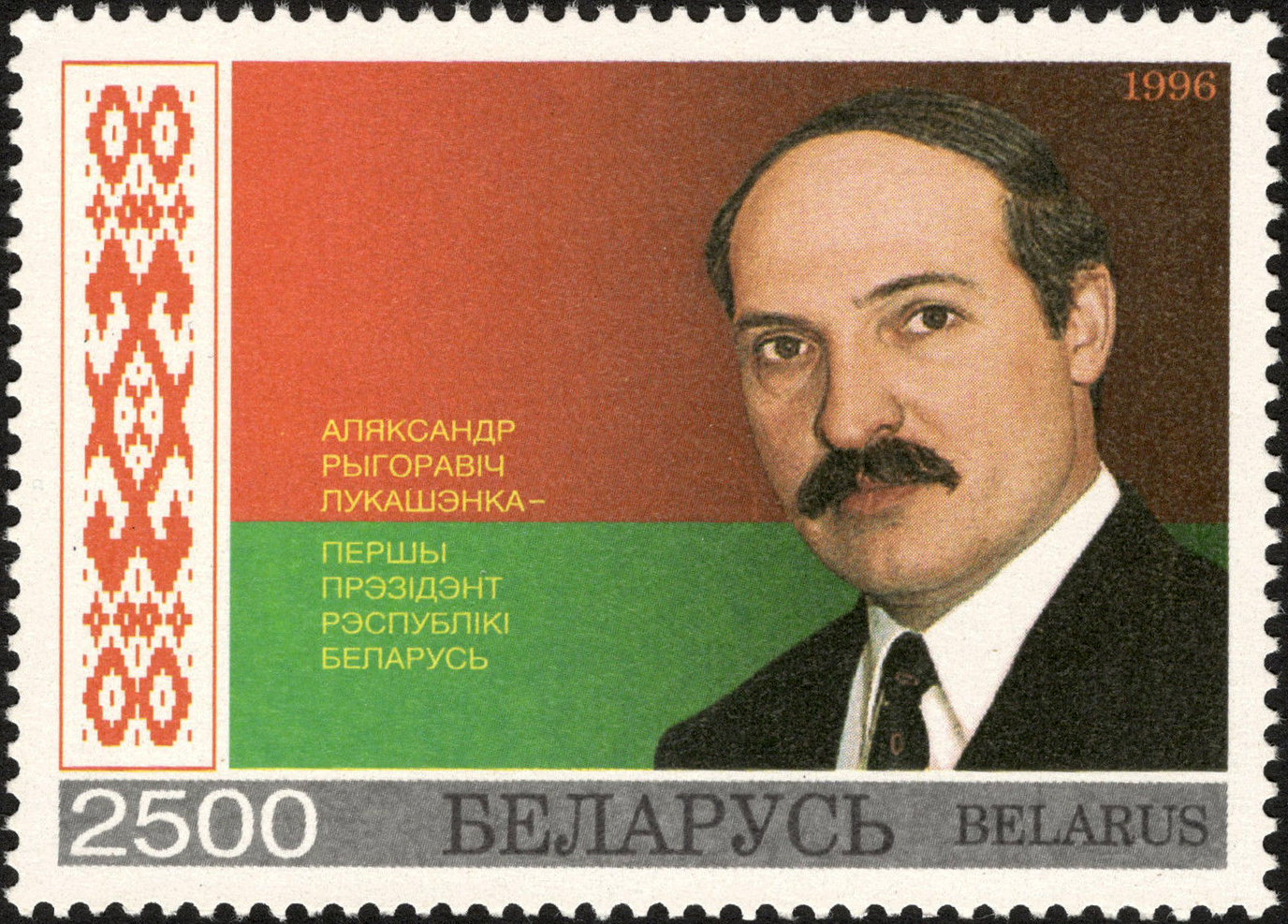
Alexander Lukashenko on a commemorative stamp with a new flag in the background, 1996

=== January-April 1996 ===
On 10 January 1996, Myechyslaw Hryb was replaced by Syamyon Sharetski as a Chairman of the Supreme Council.

On 7 April, Lukashenko meet in Moscow with Russian President Boris Yeltsin and signed a Treaty on Establishing Russian-Belarusian Union.

The Belarusian opposition responded with mass street protests, later called the Minsk Spring (or Belarusian Spring) that started on 24 March and lasted the entire year, with visible anti-Lukashenko demonstrations on 26 April (Chernobyl Way). About 50,000 people gathered near the Academy of Sciences and marched on Independence Avenue, the main street of Minsk. There were many clashes with the police, the demonstrators were dispersed by OMON, and many political activists protesting against Lukashenko’s regime were detained. Among those detained were journalists and opposition leaders, namely Yury Khadyka, Lyavon Barshchewski, Viachaslau Siuchyk and Vincuk Viačorka.

=== Final confrontation and impeachment attempt ===
==== July-November 1996 ====
The open phase of confrontation in Belarus began in July 1996, when Lukashenko demanded that the Supreme Council extend his term from five to seven years, as well as create a second chamber of parliament whose members he could appoint himself.

Lukashenko publicly stated that the current Constitution is imperfect because it was adopted by parliament behind the scenes, without discussion with the people, and argued that there is no balance of power in the system of state power and that the president is limited in his actions by the "legislative lust" of deputies. Lukashenko argued that the country needed a "conductor" or "head of the family" with virtually unlimited power.

After his official visit to Paris in July 1996, Lukashenko began to actively refer to the experience of France, claiming that he intended to reform the constitution of Belarus according to the French model. He particularly emphasized that in France the president was elected for a seven-year term at that time – he used this argument to legitimize his desire to extend his term in the eyes of the international community.

Rhetorically, the expansion of presidential powers was justified by the need to take decisive action to pull the country out of the crisis and "defeat the mafia clans". Through controlled media, Lukashenko argued that the Supreme Council was hindering his fight against crime and preventing him from "starting up factories", and stated that only strong presidential power could guarantee stability and protect people from "political adventurers". He justified his demands by saying that the Supreme Council was in a state of paralysis and collective irresponsibility.

The Supreme Council refused to meet Lukashenko's demands to extend his term without a referendum, and Lukashenko used the refusal as a pretext to initiate a plebiscite.

On 7 August, President Lukashenko officially proposed a nationwide referendum, the main topic of which was a new version of the Constitution, which de facto gave the president unlimited powers – the right to appoint judges, the head of the Central Election Commission and the Prosecutor's Office, as well as to issue decrees with a statutory character. He also refused a Polish-style round table negotiations with the opposition.

The Parliament responded with counterproposals, including a draft Constitution abolishing the office of president and the issue of electability of local government.

On 31 August, Lukashenko closed independent Radio 101.2 channel.

In September 1996, the Supreme Court appointed Viktar Hanchar as chairman of the Central Election Commission, which posed a challenge to Lukashenko, as Hanchar was his uncompromising critic.

In response, the president, using administrative resources, convened the All-Belarusian People's Assembly on 19–20 October 1996, in which a few thousands of loyalist workers and clerks supported him and approved his initiatives. He used it to delegitimize the Supreme Council.

The All-Belarusian People's Assembly had no constitutional status or legal authority to make such decisions - experts characterized it as an attempt to create a "virtual civil society" of loyal structures. This forum was created solely on Lukashenko's initiative from among selected participants - representatives of trade unions and social associations, previously prepared to unanimously approve the president's course. Some of Lukashenko's supporters proposed giving the All-Belarusian People's Assembly the power to directly approve the new constitution, similarly to the constitutional convention. However, Lukashenko rejected this idea, believing that only a nationwide referendum would give the changes the necessary legitimacy and allow them to appeal to the "voice of the people". The forum took place according to the established scenario, without the participation of the opposition and alternative views, and the expected decision to support the referendum was made.

The Constitutional Court, headed by Valery Tikhinya, attempted to exercise its arbitration function by declaring on November 4, 1996, that the referendum on constitutional amendments could only be consultative and not binding.

In response, Lukashenko issued decrees (in particular those of November 5 and 7) effectively overturning the Constitutional Court decision and parliamentary resolutions, declaring that the referendum results would be final and binding. Valery Tikhinya called these actions "legal vandalism".

The most active phase of the confrontation took place in September-November 1996, when the 13th Supreme Council launched a new round of investigations into the activities of the presidential structures (after the sensational Antonchik report of 1994 with subsequent "blank spots" in the press and attempts by the Civic Action faction in March 1996), which was entrusted to the Audit Office headed by Vasyl Sakovich. The investigation was met with serious sabotage: presidential structures refused to present documents, citing Lukashenko's personal order.

At that time, the extra-budgetary funds of the Presidential Administration, which were supplemented by extensive tax and customs concessions (for example, through secret order No. 230 of November 1995), became comparable to the country's state budget.

To ensure the desired referendum result, Lukashenko needed full control over the vote counting. On November 14, 1996, Lukashenko issued a decree (violating the Constitution, as only the parliament had the right to appoint and dismiss the chairman of the Central Election Commission) dismissing Viktar Hanchar, who accused him of numerous violations and refused to recognize the legality of the referendum. The President's security service occupied the Central Election Commission building by armed force and physically removed Hanczar from his office. The President appointed Lidia Yermoshina as the new acting chairperson of the Central Electoral Commission.

In response to these actions of the executive branch, the deputies initiated impeachment proceedings against Alexander Lukashenko. On 19 November 1996, the Supreme Council officially initiated this process – an appeal was submitted to the Constitutional Court with the signatures of 73 deputies (of the required 70), and on the same day the Court initiated proceedings on the violation of the Constitution by the president.

On 19 November 1996, a group of loyal deputies was invited to Alexander Lukashenko, as a result of which 62 deputies signed a declaration of support for the president and refusal to participate in the work of parliament. These were members of the "Consensus" ("Soglasie") faction, headed by Vladimir Konoplev – it is called the main force that carried out "destructive work" in parliament on the orders of the presidential administration.On 20 November these MPs failed to appear at the meeting in the Oval Room. Together with other absent MPs, the total number of absent MPs reached 90, leaving Parliament without the quorum (two-thirds of its members) necessary to make important decisions. Experts assess this as a deliberate sabotage of the work of the Supreme Council, organized by pro-presidential MPs. On that day, the members of parliament were to be officially informed that the Constitutional Tribunal had initiated proceedings regarding the violation of the Constitution by the president. Sabotage paralyzed the Supreme Council at a critical moment of confrontation. The technique of disrupting the quorum was not new: the executive branch had already used it in September 1995, blocking the work of the Supreme Council of the 12th convocation.

The impeachment trial was scheduled for November 22, but was effectively thwarted by the intervention of high-ranking Russian mediators who arrived in Minsk to impose the agreement.

On the night of November 21-22, a high-ranking Russian delegation arrived in Minsk: Prime Minister Viktor Chernomyrdin, Chairman of the Federation Council Yegor Stroyev and Chairman of the State Duma Gennadiy Seleznyov. Thanks to their mediation and under Russian guarantees, an agreement was signed: the parliament was to lift the impeachment and the president was to recognize the referendum as consultative.

On 22 November, after all-night negotiations with Russian mediators, confusion reigned among the deputies. The leadership of the Supreme Council (Syamyon Sharetski, Sergey Kalyakin) was preparing an additional resolution to legally secure Lukashenko's fulfillment of the obligations arising from the agreement (recognizing the referendum as consultative), as they did not trust his words.

The leader of the pro-presidential faction, Vladimir Konoplev, was running around the room with a cell phone, instructions directly from Lukashenko or his administration. At a crucial moment, Konoplev raised his phone above his head and ordered his MPs not to register to vote or to vote to disrupt the quorum (a minimum of 100 votes was required for ratification). Meanwhile, Lukashenko, who personally arrived at the Oval Office, persuaded the deputies from the podium to ratify the agreement without any additional documents or conditions.

Of the 176 MPs physically present in the Oval Room during the discussion, only 116 took part in the vote. To make a decision (ratify the agreement), a simple majority of votes from among the elected members of the Supreme Council of the 13th term was required. Meanwhile, a total of 199 deputies were elected, so a minimum of 100 votes (which corresponds to approximately 50.25% of the elected members) was required to approve the resolution. Only 83 MPs voted in favour of ratifying the agreement.

The required number of votes (100) was not reached due to the actions of the pro-presidential faction "Konsensus" ("Soglasie"), consisting of 62 deputies. Its representatives followed the instructions of Vladimir Konoplev, who gave the signal not to register to vote and not to vote. The democratic opposition also voted against or did not participate because it considered the agreement a capitulation to Lukashenko and did not want to withdraw the impeachment procedure.

Immediately after the vote failed, Lukashenko declared: "If the Supreme Council has not approved the agreement, then I am not fulfilling my obligations.". This gave him a formal reason to declare the referendum mandatory before the Russian guarantors, which he did by decree of 23 November.

The 24 November 1996 referendum took place amid a state media monopoly and massive early voting (around 20%), making fraud almost inevitable. According to the Central Election Commission, chaired by Lidia Yermoshina, over 70% of voters supported Lukashenko's proposal. The OSCE, the Council of Europe, and Western countries did not recognize the referendum results, deeming them invalid due to violations of constitutional procedures.

On 25 November, the morning after the referendum, the deputies who remained faithful to the 1994 Constitution were simply not allowed to enter the Supreme Council premises in the Government House. They were later allowed to enter the building only to collect personal belongings from their offices.

On the evening of 26 November 1996, a group of loyal MPs gathered in front of the official meeting room in the Presidential Administration building, which in itself constituted a violation of the regulations. The meeting was chaired by Deputy Chairman of the Supreme Council Yuri Malyumov, who did not have legal authorization to do so from Chairman Semyon Sharetsky. There were about 110-112 deputies in the hall (including 62 deputies from the "Consensus" faction) loyal to Alexander Lukashenko.

On the night of 26-27 November 1996, this assembly decided to terminate the function of the Supreme Council of the 13th term. This was a blatant violation of the then-current 1994 Constitution, which required at least two-thirds of the votes of elected deputies for its early dissolution. 199 deputies were elected, a minimum of 133 votes were required for the validity of the decision, and only 103 people voted for self-dissolution (approximately 52% of the elected members).

On 27 November 1996, Lukashenko signed the new Constitution. Based on the decision of a late-night meeting, Lukashenko decreed the creation of the lower house of the new parliament – the House of Representatives – from among 110 loyal deputies. Deputies who remained faithful to the 1994 Constitution and refused to recognize the referendum results were effectively forced out of the political field and permanently excluded from state activities.

== Aftermath ==
Many members of the current Belarusian opposition consider the 1995–1996 constitutional crisis as a turning point when Belarusian democracy was destroyed and replaced with a new, authoritarian form of governance with de facto presidential (or super-presidential) domination, despite de jure calling a state organization a semi-presidential republic, by a "bloodles coup d'etat". It also resulted in increased dependency of the country from Russia. By 1996, repression against former Supreme Council members and other dissidents began.

=== Members of parliaments beaten in the night from 11 to 12 April 1995 ===
- Nikolay Aksamit
- Sergei Antonchik
- Lyavon Barshchewski
- Yury Belenki
- Ihar Hermianchuk
- Valiantsin Golubev
- Boris Gunter
- Lyavon Dzyeka
- Mikola Markevich
- Vitaly Malashka
- Siarhei Navumchyk
- Zianon Pazniak
- Siarhei Popkov
- Piatro Sadoŭski
- Aleh Trusaŭ
- Ales Shut
