= Aksamit =

Aksamit is a Slavic surname literally meaning 'velvet'.

- Monica Aksamit
- Nikolay Aksamit
- Peter Aksamit of Liderovice
