= 1990 Byelorussian Supreme Soviet election =

- 4 March – 14 May 1990

310 of the 360 seats in the Supreme Soviet 181 seats needed for a majority
- Turnout: 86.5% (first round)

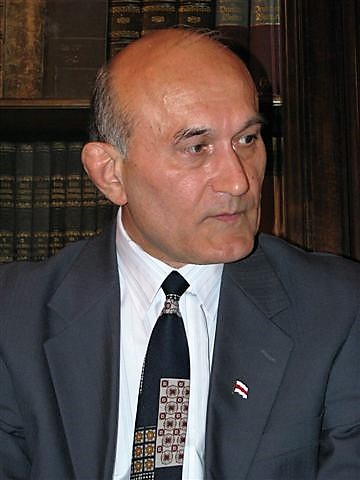
	First party	Second party
Leader	Yefrem Sokolov	Zianon Pazniak
Party	CPB	BPF
Chairman of the Presidium of the Supreme Soviet before election
Nikolai Dementey
CPSU
Chairman of the Supreme Soviet after election
Nikolai Dementey
CPSU

Parliamentary elections were held in the Byelorussian Soviet Socialist Republic in 1990 to elect the twelfth Supreme Council. A total of 1,473 candidates contested the 310 seats, while a further 50 members were appointed by organizations of veterans and invalids. However, by the time of the first meeting of the Supreme Council, only 278 of the 310 elected seats were filled.

== Results ==
In the first round of voting on 4 March 98 deputies were elected, with voter turnout at 86.5%. A second round on 17–18 March saw a further 131 deputies were elected. However, this was still below the quorum of 240. By-elections were subsequently held on 22 April (18 districts) and 5 May (63 districts) resulting in a further 38 deputies being elected. An additional eleven were elected in second rounds held between 10 and 14 May, taking the total number of elected deputies to 278, in addition to the 50 appointed deputies.

Further members were later elected, although thirteen seats were never filled.

The Belarusian Popular Front (BNF) won around 25–37 seats (different figures are given as not all of the elected members were formally members of the BNF). By the start of 1991 the Communists had broken into several factions; the main Communist Party group had 170 members, with 40 in the affiliated Agrarian group, 35 in the affiliated Industrialists group and 30 in a hardline "Union" group. The BNF faction had 27 members.

== Bibliography ==
- Палітычная гісторыя незалежнай Беларусі / Пад рэд. Валера Булгакава. Вільня, Інстытут Беларусістыкі. — 2006. — 744 с. (in Belarusian)
