= Danuta Bichel-Zagnetova =

Belarusian poet

- Native name: Данута Бічэль-Загнетава
- Born: 3 December 1937 (age 88) Grodno Region, Byelorussian SSR, Soviet Union
- Genre: Poetry

Danuta Ivanovna Bichel-Zagnetova (Belarusian: Данута Бічэль-Загнетава, born 1937) is a Belarusian poet. She is Laureate of the Kupala State Prize of the BSSR (1984) for a collection of poems "Where to Walk Barefoot."

== Biography ==
Danuta Bichel-Zagnetova was born on December 3, 1937, in Grodno Region, Belarus, then part of the Soviet Union, in a Belarusian peasant family. She graduated from Novogrudok Pedagogical School in 1957, and Grodno Pedagogical Institute in 1962 (Faculty of Philology). Following her graduation, she taught the Belarusian language and literature in Grodno schools.

In 1982, Bichel-Zagnetova headed the House-Museum of Maxim Bogdanovich.

In the late 1980s, she was actively involved in the social movement in Belarus and was one of the organizers of the Maxim Bogdanovich Society. Since 1988, she has been a member of the Belarusian Popular Front. She is also member of the PEN International in Belarus.

== Literary work ==
Bichel-Zagnetova began to write poetry in school. Her first poetic publication was in the republican newspaper Literature and Art (1953). The “Brief Literary Encyclopedia” notes that the poetry of Danuta Bichel-Zagnetova, “marked by sincerity, emotional tension and folkloric flavor of the language, is dedicated to the life of modern village, love, nature”.

In her work, Danuta Bichel-Zagnetova approaches philosophical principles intuitively, through female emotional psychology.

== Publications ==
=== Books of poetry ===
- Girl's Heart (1961)
- Neman Goes (1964)
- Lighters (1967)
- Share (1972)
- You are you (1976)
- Brothers (1979)
- Where to Walk Barefoot (1983)
- The Old Sun (1987)
- In Polesie (1990)
- God, my God (1992)
- Sunday (1998)
- On the White Clouds of Dreams (2002)
- Selected works (2016)
- Reach for Kalozha (2017)

=== Children's books ===
- Quail (1968)
- Umbrella-Mushroom (1969)
- Catching up on a horse (1973)
- Gabrynka and Gabrus (1985)
- Haradnichanka (1993)

=== Books of prose ===
- "Come to my voice" (Wroclaw, 2008)
- "St. Francis Bridge" (Minsk, 2010)
- "Province of St. Francis" (Grodno, 2010)

== Sources ==
- Белорусская ССР: краткая энциклопедия. В 5 т. Т. 5. — Минск, 1982.
- Республика Беларусь: энциклопедия. [В 7 т.]. Т. 2. — Минск, 2006.
- Беларускія пісьменнікі: біябібліяграфічны слоўнік. У 6 т. Т. 1. — Мінск, 1992.
- Петрушкевич А. Н. Поэзия Д. Бичель-Загнетовой. Проблема лирического героя : Автореф.дис.на соиск.учен.степ.канд.филол.наук: (10.01.02) / АН Республики Беларусь, Ин-т лит.им. Я.Купалы. — Мн., 1993.
- Бураўкін Г. Як сасонка у бары... // «Полымя», 1968, No. 6.
- Бярозкін Р. Хораша, чыста... // Полымя, 1973, No. 4.
- Бічэль-Загнетава Данута // Беларускія пісьменнікі (1917—1990): Даведнік; Склад. А. К. Гардзіцкі. Нав. рэд. А. Л. Верабей. — Мн.: Мастацкая літаратура, 1994. — 653 с.: іл. ISBN 5-340-00709-X
- Дэмакратычная апазіцыя Беларусі. 1956—1991 гг. Персанажы і кантэксты. Рэд. А.Дзярновіч. — Мн., 1999. ISBN 985-6374-08-1.
