= Subotniki =

Agrotown in Grodno Region, Belarus

Subotniki Суботнікі (Belarusian) Суботники (Russian)
- Agrotown
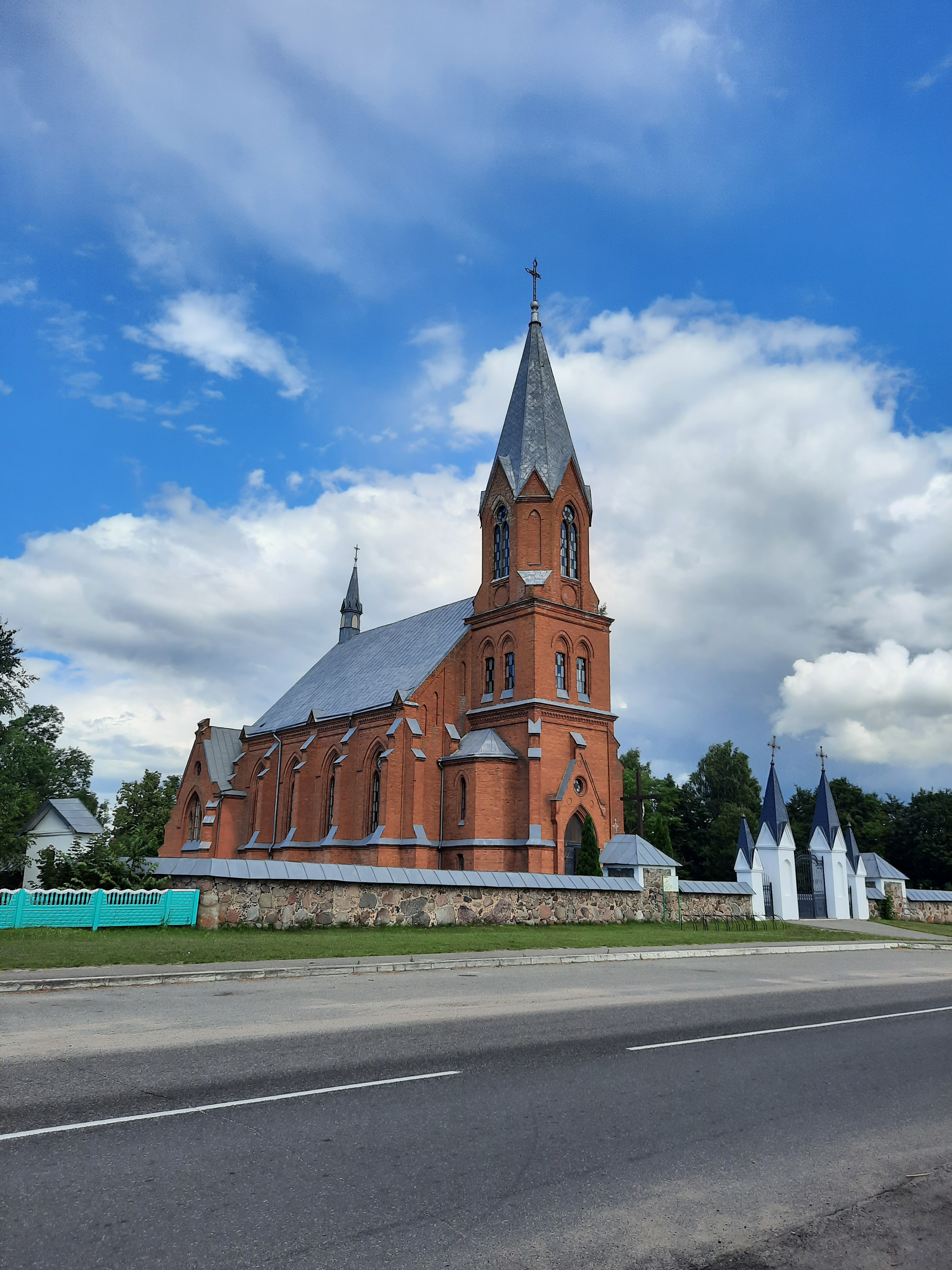
- Church of Saint Vladislav

- Location within Belarus
- Coordinates: 54°05′37″N 25°45′00″E
- Country: Belarus
- Region: Grodno Region
- District: Iwye District
- Time zone: UTC+3 (MSK)

Subotniki or Subbotniki (Belarusian: Суботнікі; Russian: Суботники, Субботники) is an agrotown in Iwye District, Grodno Region, Belarus. It serves as the administrative center of Subotniki selsoviet.

== History ==
Historical population
Year	Pop.	±%
1882	523	—
1921	542	+3.6%

Subotniki was a private town of the Radziwiłł family, administratively located in the Oszmiana County in the Vilnius Voivodeship of the Polish–Lithuanian Commonwealth.

Subotniki was administratively located in the Wołożyn County in the Nowogródek Voivodeship of interwar Poland. According to the 1921 census, the population was 89.9% Polish and 10.1% Jewish.

Following the invasion of Poland in September 1939, the town was first occupied by the Soviet Union until 1941, then by Nazi Germany until 1944, and re-occupied by the Soviet Union afterwards.

== Notable people ==
- Jan Pazniak (1887 or 1895 – after October 1939), politician and publisher
- Zianon Pazniak (born 1944), politician and one of the founders of the Belarusian Popular Front
