= Yauhen Shatokhin =

Belarusian painter and politician (1947–2012)

Yauhen Shatokhin (Belarusian: Яўген Шатохін, French transliteration: Iaouguene Chatokhine; February 25, 1947 in Pinsk – January 22, 2012 in Pinsk) was a Belarusian painter and political activist.

Shatokhin graduated from the Pedagogic Institute of Orel and the Institute of Arts and Industries in Kharkiv (today's Kharkiv State Academy of Design and Arts).

Starting 1972, Shatokhin participated in numerous expositions as well as held his personal expositions in the USSR, Poland, the United States and France.

After the break-up of the USSR he was active member of the Belarusian Artists' Union.

Over the years Shatokhin received numerous French awards, including a price of the National Assembly of France.

In 2003 he became honorary citizen of the town of Albert, France.

== Political activism ==
In the early 1990s Shatokhin joined the Belarusian Popular Front. After the party's split he remained in the Conservative Christian Party led by Zianon Pazniak.

From 1990 to 1999 Shatokhin was a member of the Pinsk town council.
