= 13th Belarusian Supreme Council =

The Supreme Council of the Republic of Belarus of the 13th convocation was the Belarusian parliament elected in 1995. Parliament began work on January 9, 1996. The powers of the Supreme Council of the 13th convocation were discontinued on November 27, 1996, after the President of Belarus Alexander Lukashenko signed the Law "On the termination of the powers of the Supreme Council of the Republic of Belarus of the 13th convocation".

== Elections ==
Elections to the Supreme Council of the Republic of Belarus of the 13th convocation were held on May 14, 1995 together with the republican referendum in Belarus in 1995. The second round of elections was held on May 28, 1995. The elections were held in accordance with the new law, adopted in November 1994. Since this year political parties can nominate candidates if they had the primary organization in the appropriate districts.

== Bibliography ==
- Палітычная гісторыя незалежнай Беларусі / Пад рэд. Валера Булгакава. Вільня, Інстытут Беларусістыкі. — 2006. — 744 с. (in Belarusian)

== See also ==
- 12th Belarusian Supreme Council
