= 12th Belarusian Supreme Council =

Convocation of the Belarusian parliament elected in 1990

Supreme Council of Belarus of the 12th convocation
←	11th Supreme Soviet of the BSSR	13th Supreme Council of Belarus	→

Overview
- Meeting place: Government House
- Term: 15 May 1990 – 9 January 1996
- Election: March–May 1990
- Members: 328 / 360 (by May 15, 1990)
- Chairman: Nikolai Dementey (1990–1991); Stanislau Shushkevich (1991–1994); Myechyslaw Hryb (1994–1996)

Supreme Soviet of Byelorussian SSR and the Supreme Council of Republic of Belarus in 1990-1995 (light red - Communist Party of Belarus (302), gray - Independents (32), dark red - Belarusian Popular Front (26)

The Supreme Soviet of the Byelorussian SSR and the Supreme Council of the Republic of Belarus of the 12th convocation is the Belarusian parliament, which was elected in 1990 as the Supreme Soviet of the Byelorussian SSR of the 12th convocation. It became a national parliament of Belarus after the proclamation of independence. The Supreme Council adopted the Declaration of Independence of Belarus on July 27, 1990. It is widely regarded as the final democratically-elected Parliament of Belarus.

The first round of voting to the Supreme Council was held on 4 March 1990. For the first time the opposition took place in Parliament. As a result, the Belarusian Popular Front opposition faction with 26 deputies was formed. The total number of deputies was 328 people.

The successor of the Supreme Council of the 12th convocation was the newly elected Supreme Council of the Republic of Belarus of the 13th convocation, which began its work January 9, 1996.

== Bibliography ==
- Палітычная гісторыя незалежнай Беларусі / Пад рэд. Валера Булгакава. Вільня, Інстытут Беларусістыкі. — 2006. — 744 с. (in Belarusian)
