= Sergei Antonchik =

Belarusian politician, labor activist, and trade unionist (born 1956)

- Сяргей Антончык

Legislator to the Supreme Council of Belarus 12th Convocation (until 19 September 1991 – Supreme Soviet of the Byelorussian Soviet Socialist Republic)
- In office 16 May 1990 – 9 January 1996

Personal details
- Born: 1 April 1956 (age 69) Plyeshchanitsy, Byelorussian SSR, Soviet Union
- Political party: Opposition BPF Party
- Awards: Belarusian Democratic Republic 100th Jubilee Medal

Sergei Antonovich Antonchik (Belarusian: Сяргей Антонавіч Антончык, Russian: Сергей Антонович Антончик; born 1 April 1956) is a Belarusian politician, labor activist and trade unionist. From 1990 to 1996, he served as a legislator in the Supreme Soviet of the Byelorussian SSR / Supreme Council of Belarus 12th Convocation. He was affiliated with the BPF Party, a parliamentary faction that supported Belarusian independence. In 1994, Antonchik authored a report alleging corruption involving President Alexander Lukashenko and Prime Minister Mikhail Chigir. The publication of the report was restricted, and newspapers printed with blank spaces where the report was intended to appear.

== Early life and education ==
Antonchik was born on 1 April 1956 in the urban-type settlement of Plyeshchanitsy, Lahoysk district, Minsk region, Byelorussian SSR, Soviet Union, and completed his secondary education.

== Career ==
Sergei Antonchik worked as a galvanizer and equipment operator at the Minsk Lenin Production Association, currently known as the BiełWAR Instrument-Making Factory. Beginning in 1988, he became involved in political activism and participated in the formation of the Belarusian labor movement. He was a leader of labor protests and served as chair of the strike committee during mass worker demonstrations in Minsk, either in April 1990 or 1991, depending on the source. On 16 May 1990, Antonchik was elected to the Supreme Soviet of the Byelorussian SSR (12th Convocation) from the Yaseninsky Electoral District No. 17 in Minsk. During his term, he served on several parliamentary bodies, including the Mandate Committee, the Committee on Labor, the Committee on Prices, the Employment Committee, the Social Protection Committee, and the Temporary Committee on Privileges. In 1993, he joined the Temporary Committee to Investigate the Activities of Commercial Structures Established under State Authorities, commonly known as the "Anti-Corruption Committee," chaired by Alexander Lukashenko. Alongside Alexander Lukashenko, he co-authored a report on corruption within state institutions in December 1993. The report contributed to Lukashenko’s rise in popularity ahead of the 1994 presidential election. Antonchik was a member of the opposition BPF Party and participated in its parliamentary faction. He held positions within the party’s "Shadow Cabinet," where he chaired the Anti-Corruption Committee and co-headed the shadow Ministry of Labor, Social Protection, and Privatization Oversight. He contributed to drafting and adopting the Declaration of State Sovereignty of Belarus and legislative measures related to Belarus’s declaration of independence during the Supreme Soviet session of 24–25 August 1991. He co-authored multiple legislative proposals advanced by the BPF Party.

On 11–12 April 1995, Antonchik took part in a hunger strike held by BPF Party deputies inside the parliament building. The protest opposed a presidential referendum on introducing Russian as a second state language, changing the national symbols, increasing integration with Russia, and granting the president authority to dissolve the legislature. During the night, Antonchik and other protesters were forcibly removed by security forces and left outside the building. In August 1995, during a metro workers' strike in Minsk, Antonchik was detained by state security services and held for three days in a Ministry of Internal Affairs facility. His term in the Supreme Council ended on 9 January 1996.

=== Corruption report ===
On 20 December 1994, Antonchik presented a report to the Supreme Council alleging corruption, unlawful commercial activities, and organized crime links involving officials in the presidential administration and the government of Prime Minister Mikhail Chigir. The report claimed that President Alexander Lukashenko had engaged in or enabled acts of corruption and accused Leanid Sinitsyn, head of the Presidential Administration, of accepting bribes from Gazprom Transgaz. Following the report’s presentation, several officials named in the document expressed an intention to resign, though no formal resignations occurred. The Supreme Council forwarded the report to Prosecutor General Vasil Shaladov, who found no grounds for investigation. Despite the Council’s approval of the report’s publication, President Lukashenko ordered it banned from the press. News outlets, under pressure from presidential staff, printed editions with blank spaces where the report was intended to appear. Editors who disregarded the ban reportedly lost their positions. Subsequently, the head of Presidential Affairs, Ivan Titenkov, filed a defamation lawsuit against Antonchik. The court ruled against Antonchik, resulting in the partial confiscation of his property.

According to diplomat Brian Bennett, Antonchik expected his report to have a political impact similar to Lukashenko’s earlier anti-corruption report but misjudged the public and political response. Although the report did not gain wide circulation, it prompted parliamentary debate concerning censorship, freedom of speech, and presidential accountability, including discussions on possible impeachment. Historian Eugeniusz Mironowicz characterized the incident as an early example of restrictions on democratic procedures and press freedom in Belarus.

== Post-parliamentary career ==
In 1999, Sergei Antonchik participated in efforts by the opposition and members of the dissolved Supreme Council to hold alternative presidential elections, which did not result in the election of a new president. That same year, he headed the public Fund for Supporting the Unemployed. In the late 1990s, he focused on the development of independent trade unions and led the unregistered organization Workers' Self-Help. During the campaign for the 2001 presidential election, Antonchik declared his intention to run for office. His initiative group was registered on 15 June 2001. On 19 July, he announced that he had collected 116,000 signatures, surpassing the required threshold of 100,000. On the same day, he withdrew his candidacy and joined the campaign of Mikhail Marynich, citing a desire to support a unified opposition candidate. Some sources disputed his claim, stating that he had failed to gather the necessary number of valid signatures. On 9 September 2001, following the close of voting, Antonchik took part in an opposition protest alleging electoral violations. From 2002 to 2004, Antonchik attempted to establish the Fatherland social organization, which focused on humanitarian issues and the protection of human rights. He reported that the organizing committee had representatives in approximately 240 localities across Belarus, with the aim of uniting a large segment of the population.

Antonchik faced multiple instances of administrative penalties and detentions. In April 1999, he was detained for allegedly organizing an unauthorized rally at a factory in Orsha. Although witnesses later withdrew their claims, he was fined 10 million Belarusian rubles for addressing workers’ questions, under Article 167.1 of the Belarusian Code of Administrative Offenses. Between 2004 and 2005, attempts to officially register the Fatherland organization were obstructed by authorities. On 5 October 2004, Antonchik was sentenced to 15 days of detention for organizing an unauthorized meeting. Another source states that he was fined for holding such a meeting in a private apartment, though it is unclear if both references concern the same event. On 24 February 2005, he was fined the equivalent of US$1,600 by a Minsk court for holding an unauthorized gathering in a private apartment. In March 2006, shortly before the presidential election, Antonchik and his son were detained near their home and sentenced to 15 days’ detention for alleged use of obscene language and resisting police. On the morning of 10 March 2006, days before the presidential election, he and his son Aleksandr were detained at a bus stop near their home while he was seeing his son off to work. Both were sentenced to 15 days' detention for "obscene language" and "resisting police". Due to his political activities, Antonchik experienced long-term unemployment. In 2008, he was employed as a manual laborer.

He participated in a protest against Belarus–Russia integration on 20 December 2019 and was fined 810 Belarusian rubles by the Maskouski District Court of Minsk.

In May 2021, he was fined 900 Belarusian rubles for unauthorized picketing, related to decorative stones at his residence displaying the Belarusian national coat of arms and flag.

== Views and assessments ==
During his 2001 presidential election campaign, Antonchik focused on gaining support from trade unions and voters who supported the incumbent president. He argued that the opposition should expand beyond its traditional base and proposed policies aimed at economic reform, decreasing reliance on Russia, and strengthening ties with the European Union. He also advocated for the repeal of laws he considered anti-national and the promotion of younger professionals in governance.

In 2010, Zianon Pazniak described Antonchik from the early 1990s in his memoirs as follows:

A well-known fighter against the communist-Soviet regime, a soulful person with keen, innate intelligence and a friendly character (...) the nomenklatura persistently hated him.

== Personal life ==
Sergei Antonchik is married and has three children. He is non-partisan. One of his sons, Aleksandr, is married and works as a double-glazed window fitter.

== Awards ==
- Belarusian Democratic Republic 100th Jubilee Medal – 2019
