= Jan Pazniak =

Belarusian politician

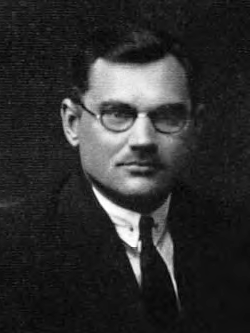
Photo of Jan Pazniak

Jan Pazniak (19 February 1887 or 1895 in Subotniki - after October 1939 in Minsk) was a Belarusian politician and publisher, serving as the chairman of the Vilnius Belarusian National Committee in the 1930s. He was arrested by the NKVD in October 1939 at the start of World War II and was probably shot dead by them in Minsk. He was the grandfather of Zianon Pazniak.
