= Siarhei Navumchyk =

Belarusian journalist and politician

- Сяргей Навумчык
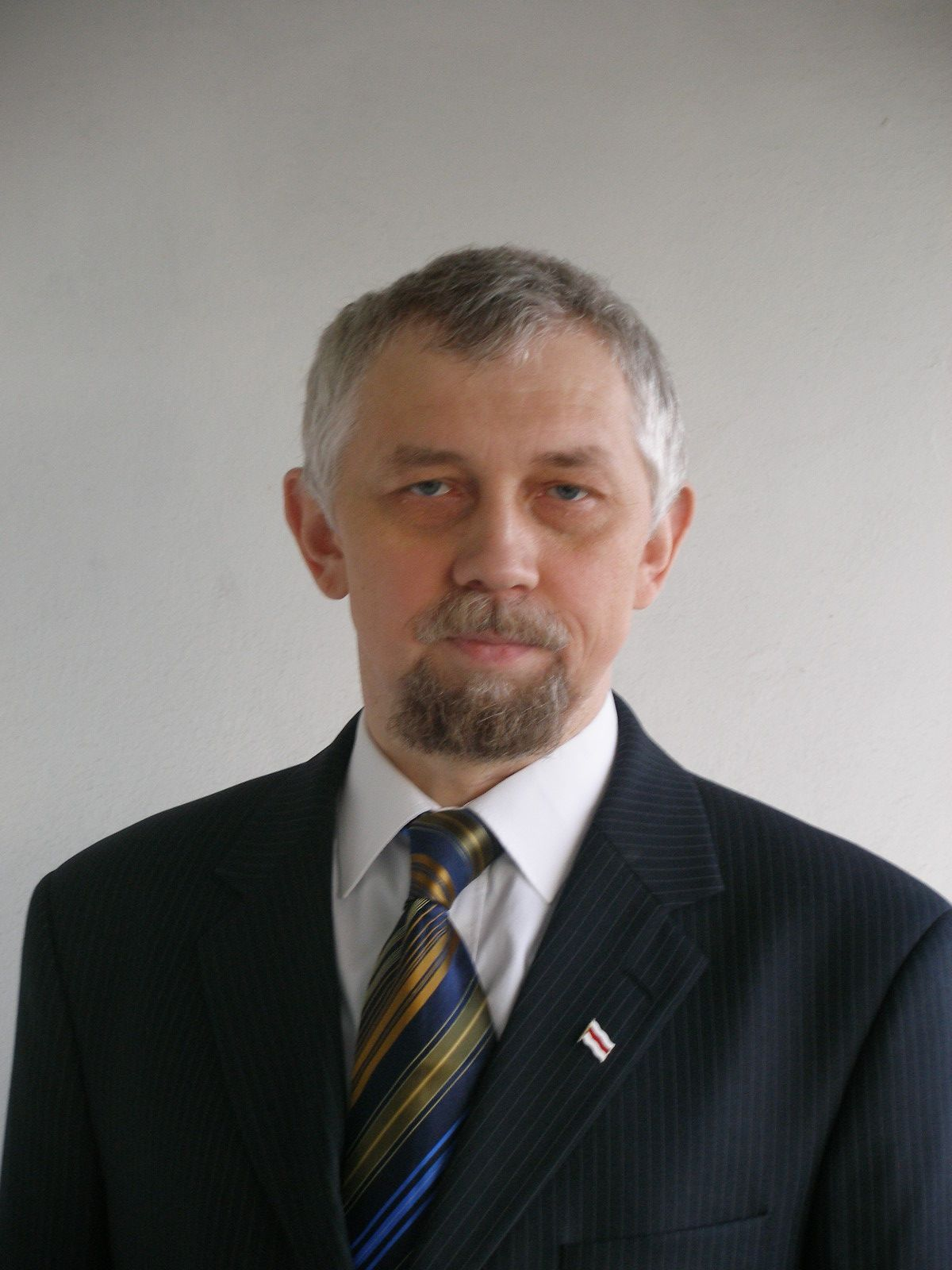

Vice President of the Rada of the Belarusian Democratic Republic in exile
- Incumbent
- Assumed office 1997
- President: Ivonka Survilla

Member of the Supreme Soviet of Belarus
- In office 1990–1995

Personal details
- Born: January 15, 1961 (age 65) Pastavy, Byelorussian SSR, USSR (present-day Belarus)
- Party: Belarusian Popular Front (in the 1990s)
- Education: Belarusian State University
- Profession: Journalist

Siarhei Iosifavich Navumchyk (Note: Belarusian: Сяргей Іосіфавіч Навумчык, romanized: Syarhyey Iosifavich Navumchyk; Russian: Сергей Иосифович Наумчик, romanized: Sergey Iosifovich Naumchik) (born January 15, 1961) is a Belarusian journalist and politician.

Navumchyk was born in Pastavy into a family of a Soviet state serviceman. In 1984 he graduated from the journalism faculty of the Belarusian State University in Minsk.

Navumchyk was member of the parliament of Belarus in 1990 - 1995 and one of the key members of the fraction of the Belarusian Popular Front.

On April 12, 1995, Navumchyk, along with other members of the parliamentary opposition, held a hunger strike and sitting protest against the controversial referendum initiated by president Alexander Lukashenko.

On March 26, 1996, Navumchyk fled from Belarus together with BPF party leader Zianon Pazniak. According to unverified information, the government of Alexander Lukashenko has ordered an arrest of Pazniak and Navumchyk, who both were prominent opposition figures. Siarhei Navumchyk subsequently got political asylum in the United States and currently works for the Belarusian edition of Radio Liberty.

Since 1997, Siarhei Navumchyk is vice president of the Council of the Belarusian Democratic Republic in exile.
