= Chernobyl Way =

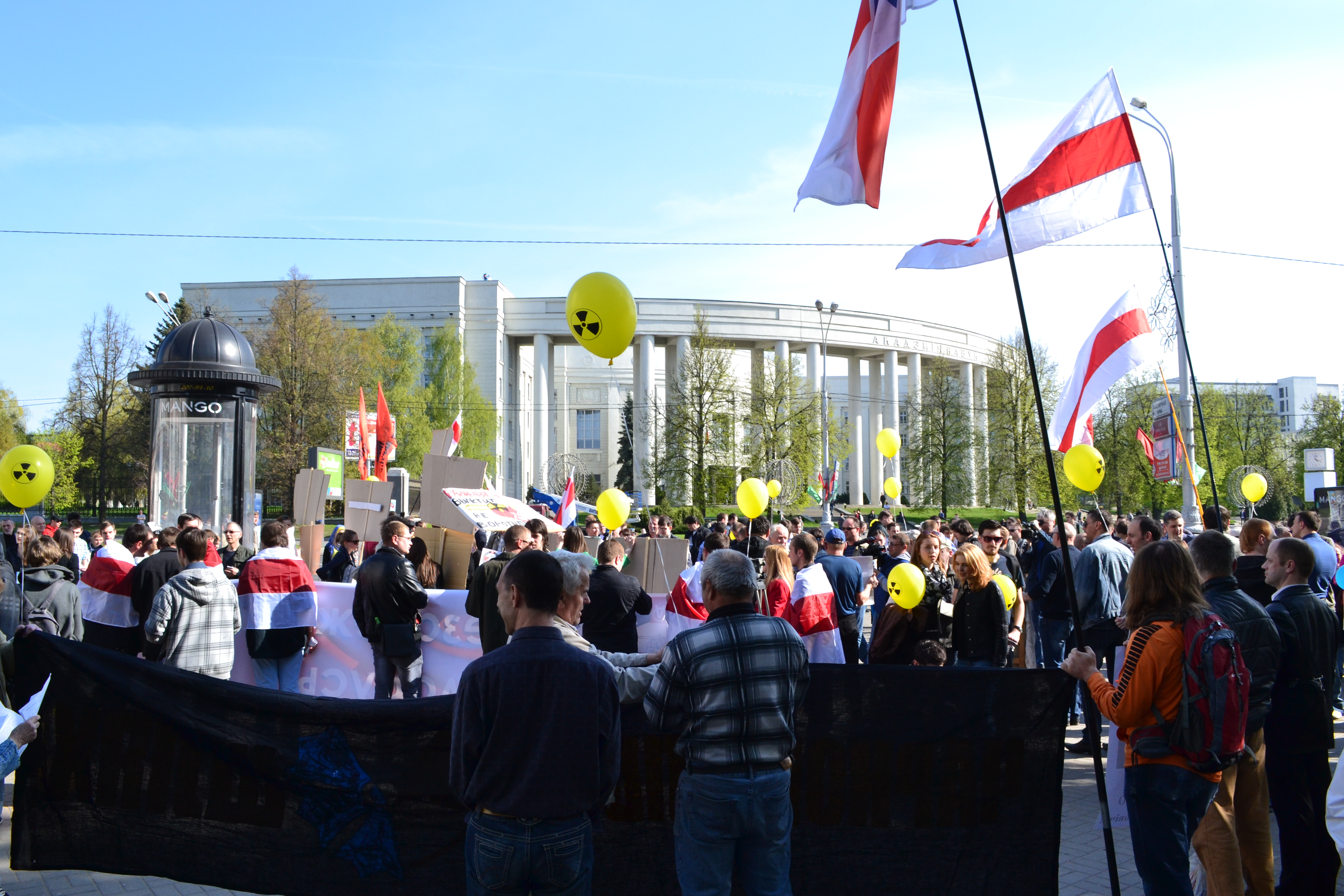
Chernobyl Way (2014)

Chernobyl Way (Belarusian: Чарнобыльскі шлях, romanized: Čarnobylski šlach, Russian: Чернобыльский шлях, Чернобыльский путь, romanized: Chernobyl'sky shlyakh, Chernobyl'sky put') is an annual rally held on April 26 by the opposition in Belarus as a remembrance of the Chernobyl disaster.

== History ==
It was first held in 1989 with demands of urgent efforts in eliminating the consequences of the catastrophe. That year, about 30,000 participants marched from the Minsk Watch Plant through the downtown to the Independence Square and held a rally there.

In 1996, the largest Chernobyl Way took place in Minsk marking the 10th anniversary of the Chernobyl disaster. It was the first Chernobyl Way during Lukashenko's presidency. About 50,000 people gathered near the Academy of Sciences and marched on Independence Avenue, the main street of Minsk. There were many clashes with the police, the demonstrators were dispersed by OMON, and many political activists protesting against Lukashenko’s regime were detained. Among those detained were journalists and opposition leaders, namely Yury Khadyka, Lyavon Barshchewski, Viachaslau Siuchyk and Vincuk Viačorka.

After this rally opposition leader Zianon Pazniak left the country. Staff of the Maksim Bahdanovič Literary Museum started helping the arrested and their families, and this is how the Viasna Human Rights Center was created.
