= Nikolay Aksamit =

Belarusian artist and politician (1954–2024)

- Николай Аксамит; Мікалай Аксаміт
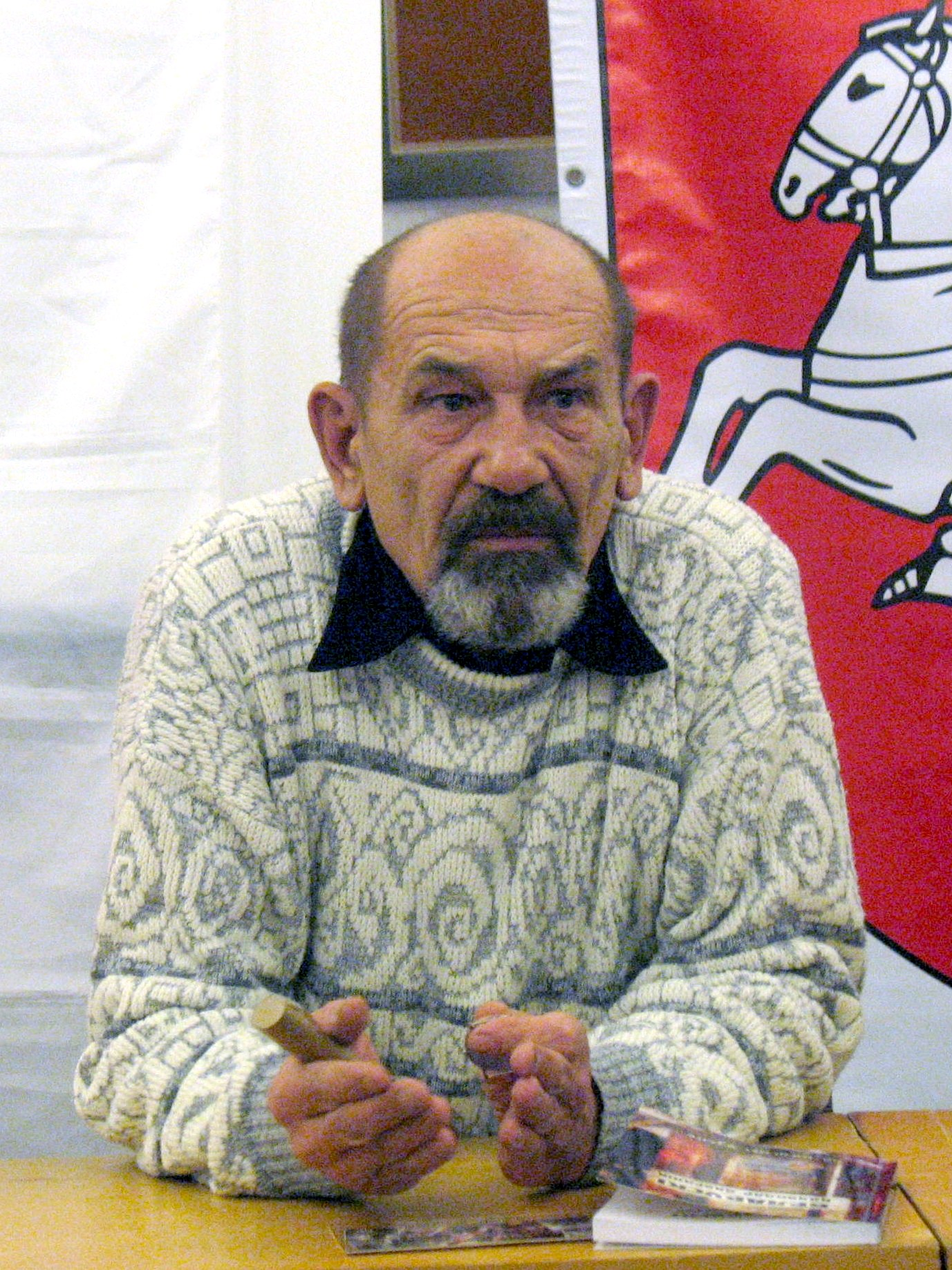
- Aksamit in 2007

Member of the Supreme Council of Belarus
- In office 1990 – 8 January 1996

Personal details
- Born: Nikolay Vladimirovich Aksamit; 18 May 1954
- Died: 28 January 2024 (aged 69) Vawkavysk, Belarus
- Party: PBNF
- Education: Belarusian State Academy of Arts
- Occupation: Artist

Nikolay Vladimirovich Aksamit (Belarusian: Мікалай Уладзіміравіч Аксаміт, Mikałaj Uładzimiravič Aksamit; 18 May 1954 – 28 January 2024) was a Belarusian artist and politician. A member of the BPF Party, he served in the Supreme Council from 1990 to 1996.

Aksamit died in Vawkavysk on 28 January 2024, at the age of 69.
