= Zianon Pazniak =

Belarusian politician and pro-democracy activist

- Зянон Пазняк
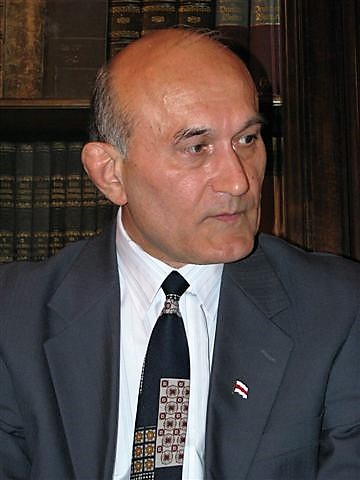
- Pazniak in 2008

Chairman of the Conservative Christian Party – BPF
- Incumbent
- Assumed office 26 September 1999
- Preceded by: Party established

Chairman of the Belarusian Popular Front (BPF)
- In office 25 July 1989 – 31 July 1999
- Preceded by: Party established
- Succeeded by: Party split

Deputy to the Supreme Council of Belarus
- In office 15 May 1990 – 28 May 1995

Chairman of the BPF Parliamentary Faction in the Supreme Council of the Republic of Belarus
- In office 15 May 1990 – 28 May 1995

Personal details
- Born: 24 April 1944 (age 82) Subotniki, Byelorussian SSR, Soviet Union
- Party: Conservative Christian Party – BPF
- Spouse: Halina Vaščanka (m. 1995)
- Children: Nadzieja (adopted)
- Education: Belarusian State Institute of Theatre and Arts
- Awards: Belarusian Democratic Republic 100th Jubilee Medal (2018); Order of the Pahonia (1st Class) (2024)
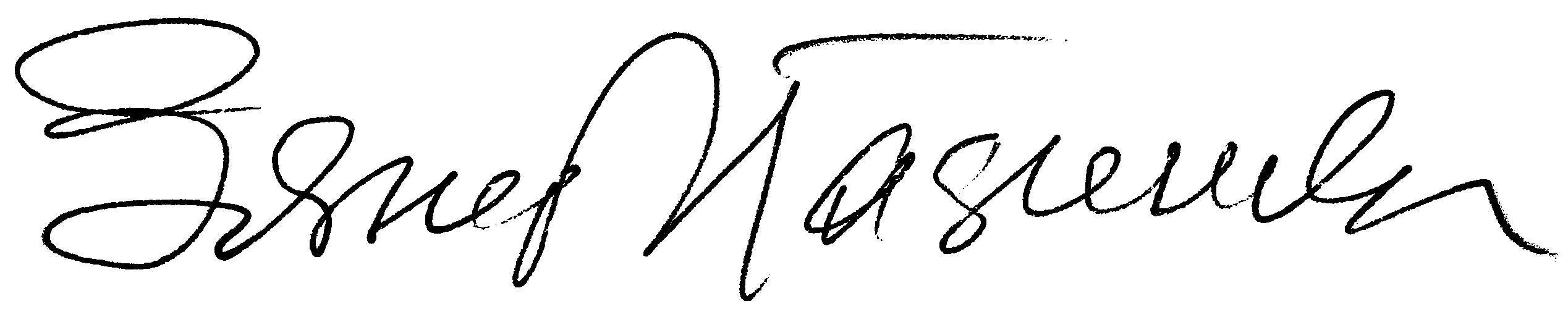
- Signature

Zianon Stanisłavavič Pazniak (Note: Belarusian: Зянон Станіслававіч Пазняк, romanized: Zyanon Stanislavavich Paznyak) (born 24 April 1944) is a Belarusian nationalist politician, archaeologist, and pro-democracy activist. He was a founding figure of the Belarusian Popular Front (BPF) and served as the chairman of its parliamentary fraction in the Supreme Council of Belarus from 1990 to 1995. He rose to prominence in politics in 1988 after revealing the NKVD's mass executions during the Great Purge in Kurapaty, which galvanized the Belarusian independence movement and anti-Soviet sentiment. He was a candidate in the 1994 election, the first presidential election of Belarus following its independence, in which Pazniak placed fourth. Since then, he has remained a vocal critic of President Alexander Lukashenko and Russian influence in Belarus, and after the BPF's split in 1999 became Chairman of the Conservative Christian Party – BPF.

Before entering politics, Pazniak graduated from the Belarusian State Academy of Arts and worked on preserving Minsk's historical architecture in the Trinity Suburb and Nyamiha (or Nemiga). Eventually, he became an archaeologist at the History Institute of the Belarusian Science Academy. During his time there, in 1988, he made public his research on the NKVD's executions in the forest of Kurapaty alongside colleague Yauhen Shmygalev, which he called a genocide. This led to independence sentiments, and so he founded the BPF in response and became a part of the Supreme Soviet. As a parliamentarian, he led efforts to restore Belarusian national symbols and declare independence from the USSR. He was a prominent critic of the 1995 Belarusian referendum, which brought forth the proposal to grant the Russian language an equal status alongside the Belarusian language and reintroduced Soviet-era symbols, so he started a hunger strike. After the start of Minsk Spring in 1996, Pazniak stated he was being hunted by security forces, but returned for Chernobyl Way where he stated he had to escape from special forces trying to capture him. Following this, he fled Belarus and claimed political asylum in the United States.

Since his time in exile, he continued to lead the BPF before it splintered due to internal factions in 1999. He then founded the Conservative Christian Party – BPF. He has continued to advocate for Belarusian sovereignty and democracy, and has been a prominent critic of what he states is Russian imperialism. He has criticized both the current Belarusian government and many members of the Belarusian opposition for being "agents" of Russia. He has also led a boycott of every presidential election since 1996 with his party, which he states is because by participating, it only legitimizes Lukashenko. However, due to this, he has been controversial, with some stating that he has only hurt the opposition since the 2000s. Critics accuse him of isolating himself ideologically by refusing to cooperate with broader coalitions, which they state weakens the opposition's unity against Lukashenko's regime. His repeated calls for election boycotts and denouncing many members of the opposition have made some analysts argue that he has only fragmented dissent.

== Early life and education ==
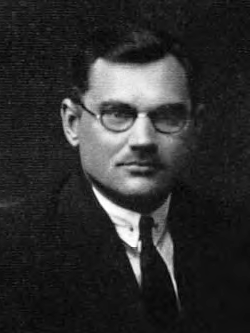
Jan Pazniak

Zianon Stanislavavich Pazniak was born on 24 April 1944 in the village of Subotniki, in what was then the Baranavichy Region in the Byelorussian SSR. At the time of Pazniak's birth, the area was under German occupation during the midst of World War II. He was born into a Catholic family, and natively spoke the Belarusian language. His mother, Hanna Jaŭchimaŭna Pazniak, was a native of Subotniki and lived there almost her entire lifetime. Through his mother, he was the grandson of Jan Pazniak, who was a publicist and politician active in the Belarusian Christian educational movement and the Christian Democratic Union during its founding. He was eventually arrested by the NKVD in Vilna (Vilnius) during 1939, and according to one version, was held in a prison in Staraja Vilejka near Maladziechna until 1941, but the circumstances of his death are unknown.

Soon after Zianon's birth, his father, Stanisłaŭ Janavič Pazniak, was drafted into the Red Army. In December 1944, when Stanisłaŭ served on Eastern Front during World War II, he was killed, which left Zianon to be raised by his mother. Later on Pazniak said that his life was not different with the loss of his father, as his mother insisted on imitating what she thought Stanisłaŭ would do when raising him. When he was six, he stated that there was an influx of Russian settlers due to collective farms; the cultural friction and lack of mutual understanding contributed to an anti-Soviet atmosphere in the village. At the age of 14, he began training in photography under the local master in the area, a habit he would continue to do during the next few decades, where he photographed the city of Minsk. For his secondary schooling, he attended the local grammar school in his hometown of Subotniki. When he was in the 10th grade, he was forced to join the Komsomol. He initially resisted on the basis of his dislike of communism and foreign ideology, but he would otherwise not receive his certificate of maturity (the secondary school leaving certificate), so he formally joined.

After finishing his secondary education, he moved to Moscow at the age of eighteen in order to study astronomy at Moscow State University. He stated that he was not definite on his choice of career: he had switched between wanting to do history, photography, and theater at the All-Russian State University of Cinematography and the Russian Institute of Theater Arts. However, he returned to Belarus by train through Smolensk as he stated he disliked the city upon arriving. He also stated he was told that he would fail by a vice-rector at Maly Theatere for not speaking Russian, and that it would be better for him to go to the theater institute in Belarus for acting when he decided to pursue it.

He then started studying at the Belarusian State Institute of Theatre and Arts in acting (briefly he entered journalism but switched out). During his second year, he was expelled from the institute for being "politically unreliable" by the party committee. During the winter after his expulsion, he slept at his friends' place while working as a stagehand at an opera house and as a photographer. He was later reinstated on the persuasion of Maxim Tank, but chose to enter the Faculty of Arts instead. He was expelled a second time shortly before his final exams in philosophy, which would've earned him a red diploma (honors degree), for allegedly tearing down a newspaper on the wall of the school written in Russian. However, he was allowed to graduate from the institute in 1968 and defend his diploma after it was made public that he was expelled on the orders of the KGB.

In 1969, a year after graduating, he entered the graduate school of the Institute of Ethnography and History of Art and Folklore of the Academy of Sciences of the BSSR. He became notable during the year he entered for his publishing of the article "Caring for the Future" in the newspaper Pravda, which focused on the river Nyamiha (or Nemiga) in Minsk. In opposition to Pyotr Masherov's plan to destroy it, he attempted to collect signatures to send to Masherov against it, but eventually went to the newspaper, where it was approved by Mikhail Zimyanin for publication. Masherov decided not to go through with destroying the Nemiga outwards, until at least 1972. He completed his studies at the institute in 1972.

== Archaeological career ==
In 1972 he started dedicating himself full-time to preserving the old section of Minsk and its conservation efforts by collecting signatures in the Trinity Suburb. Upon completion of his university studies, Pazniak worked as an arts researcher. He also started creating samizdat by using a typewriter purchased from a commission shop, specifically writing about the destruction of the culture of Belarus, while also working on a dissertation about repressed individuals associated with Belarusian nationalism like Vatslaw Lastowski. After a wave of Soviet political-administrative repressions in 1974, he lost his job at the Arts Institute on the basis of staff cuts. Through Alexander Kuzmin, a secretary for ideology of the Central Committee, he was able to be reinstated, but was advised not to return to the arts, so he chose history. Pazniak worked as an archaeologist at the Archaeological Division of the History Institute of the Belarusian Science Academy. His specialisation was the Late Middle Ages in Belarus. He was heavily involved in efforts to preserve the remaining section of the historic centre of Minsk, which was considerably damaged by the redevelopment efforts undertaken by the Soviet administration after the end of the Second World War. He also became more involved in the literary movement in the late 1980s, writing books on the history of Belarus and poems. In 1981 Pazniak successfully defended a doctoral dissertation on the history of the theatre.

On 3 June 1988, Zianon Pazniak made public his research on NKVD mass executions in the forest of Kurapaty near Minsk, which he did alongside Yauhen Shmygalev. He published the article in the newspaper Litaratura i Mastactwa (Literature and Art) under the title "Kurapaty - the road to death", where it was specifically published because the newspaper was relatively small, so it would be missed by Soviet censorship. Vasil Bykaŭ wrote the preface to the article. He, for the first time in Soviet Belarus, used the term genocide to define the events at Kurapaty, which became known as "genozid". He stated that the events at Kurapaty were a symbol of "Stalinist genocide" to make a method of changing demographics. He later used these terms against Lukashenko, who he stated led a regime of "cultural genocide" to eliminate Belarusian culture. According to the book "Kurapaty: The Investigation Continues", which was published soon after in 1990, three boys in Zeleny Lug made the discovery of 23 of the graves on 1 May 1988, but Pazniak himself did not actually do the excavation part and only arrived after to document it and do an examination of the graves. The article was broadcast on central television and republished in newspapers, prompting the Prosecutor of the BSSR, Georgy Tarnavsky, to open a criminal case into Kurapaty. The commission for the case was headed by Yazep Brolišs. This quickly evoked a response in Belarusian society that was anti-Soviet due to the executions and also ignited independence sentiments. In-depth excavations of the tract were conducted starting on 6 July, which Pazniak participated in, which eventually concluded that more than 100 thousand people were buried at Kurapaty.

== Political career ==
=== Founding of the BPF ===
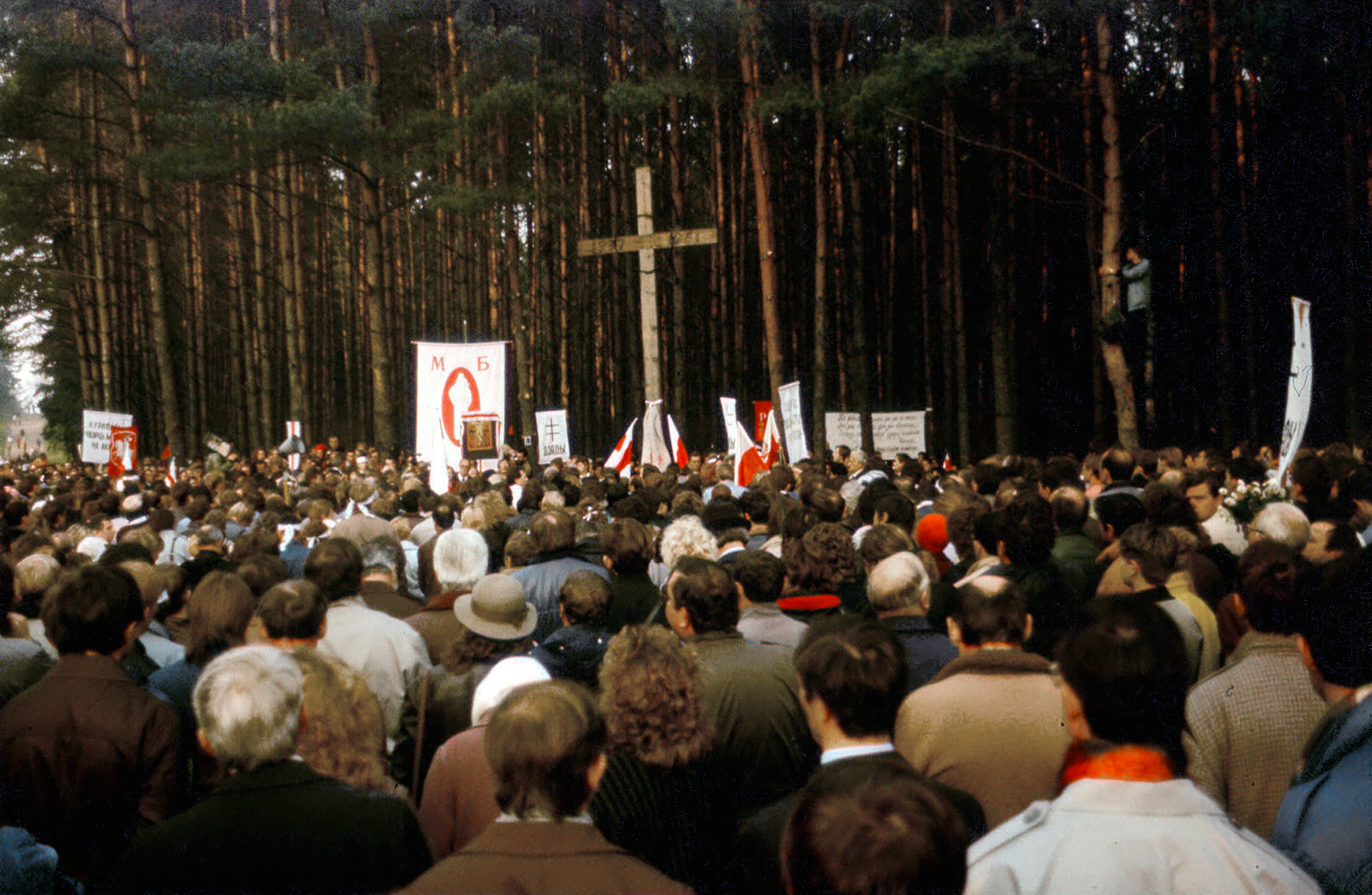
The events of Dziady-88 (pictured here) occurred because of Pazniak's research into Kurapaty. He proposed the requiem and the cross procession.

On 19 October 1988, Pazniak convened a meeting with other nationalists at the Minsk House of Cinema (now the Red Church) to create an organizing committee of the Belarusian Popular Front (BPF) and also the movement "Martyrology of Belarus" to document repressions in the USSR. The BPF was modeled after popular fronts in the Baltics. Soon after this, thousands of people in Minsk marched to Kurapaty in what came to be known as Dziady-88, spurred by the committee's revelations. During the events of Dziady-88, Pazniak proposed the idea of a cross procession with a requiem being performed for the victims, which was implemented. Though the rally ended with arrests and tear gas, Pazniak managed to read the Front's declaration before being detained by Soviet police. The founding congress of the BPF took place in Vilnius from 24 June to 25 June 1989, as it was not permitted in Minsk, which was attended by about 400 delegates. BPF was the first party in the modern history of Belarus following the dissolution of the Soviet Union. It quickly became popular as there was no other opposition movement, which also led to Alexander Lukashenko briefly supporting the movement and also giving a speech at a rally alongside Pazniak in Mogilev.

=== Parliamentary activities ===
During the 1990 Byelorussian Supreme Soviet election for the 12th Supreme Soviet on an alternative basis, Pazniak led the BPF in the elections to receiving 30 direct members in the Supreme Soviet, which also indirectly included 30 others who supported the BPF. Pazniak was one of the members elected in the 1990 election during the first round, and quickly advocated for a clear separation of the democratic faction. He initially met resistance, as the authorities refused to register him as a candidate and the Central Election Commission invalidated BPF nominations; however the BPF members were re-registered under external pressure. One of his only first actions during his time in the Supreme Soviet was leading the push to return Belarusian national symbols as state symbols. In March 1991, he led the BPF fraction to attempting to achieve Belarusian independence, thus also creating Belarusian citizenship and its own congress called the All-Belarusian Constituent Congress. These attempts were blocked by the Communist majority in the Supreme Soviet who instead supported President Mikhail Gorbachev's idea of creating a Union of Soviet Sovereign Republics, which Belarus intended to sign on 20 August 1991. When security services attempted to form the State Committee on the State of Emergency (GKChP), led the BPF in rejecting the move during the coup, calling it an "unconstitutional seizure of power". On 22 August, when the coup failed, a session of the Supreme Soviet was convened, which led to the BPF deputies drafting a package of bills and forcing Anatoly Malofeyev (the leader of the Communist fraction in the BSSR) off the podium. On 25 August the declaration of independence was announced and Belarus became de jure independent.

Prior to the first session of the independent Belarusian congress, Pazniak led BPF deputies on drafting 31 bills on state matters, including a denunciation of the 1922 treaty creating the USSR. All of these bills were later implemented during the session, except for private land ownership. During subsequent negotiations in October 1990 with Polish diplomats about shaping mutual relations and the border, Pazniak opposed the Białystok Voivodeship being part of Poland, calling it "ethnically Belarusian" and thus supposed to be Belarusian land. He also advocated for a special status for Belarusians in Białystok, and stated there was "anti-Belarusian terror" in Poland. Eventually, he became part of the Constitutional Committee.

In 1992, he attempted to get a referendum approved, which got approved in April with 442 thousand signatures being sent to the CEC. The referendum asked Belarusians whether they agreed to the early dissolution of the current Supreme Soviet and parliamentary elections. The BPF wished to pass the referendum to carry out reforms in response to independence. However, the majority of the Supreme Soviet did not approve a date for the referendum, and so it was never carried out.

In 1995, Lukashenko proposed a referendum that would abolish the white-red-white flag, the Pahonia coat of arms, introduce the Russian language as an official language alongside Belarusian, pursue economic integration with Russia, and grant Lukashenko the right to dissolve the Supreme Soviet. Members of the BPF argued the proposals violated the Constitution. After drafting a resolution, in April 1995 he condemned the Communist Party of Belarus for rejecting reforms and supporting the referendum, which he argued would strip a Belarusian national identity. In response, he and other BPF members initiated a hunger strike in the Oval Hall of the Government House, which lasted only one day, until 11 April. Pazniak accused the government of using KGB Alpha Group members to storm the hall and halt the strike, assaulting the deputies with batons. He continued to lead the BPF members in not recognizing the referendum's results when it passed, which he called a constitutional violation. Andrei Lazutkin would later mention that Pazniak accepted the results of the 1995 referendum, when in reality he criticized it for violations and that Russia was waging a cold war against the country.

During the First Chechen War in 1994, the BPF under Pazniak accused Russia of imperial aggression against Chechnya, and held a rally in support of Chechnya. In early 1995, BPF deputies issued a statement condemning the war as an "imperialist campaign violating human rights", which was driven by corporate interests and a crime against humanity and demanded a withdrawal of Russian troops and Chechen self-determination. Lukashenko claimed Pazniak had urged Belarusians to fight for Chechnya with his statements, to which Pazniak sued Lukashenko for defamation. After it reached the Supreme Court of Belarus, the court ruled in favor of Pazniak, but this was later overturned by the Supreme Court's Presidium on 11 September 1995. He subsequently accused the judicial branch of ceasing to be independent and in favor of the president.

During the 1995 Belarusian parliamentary election, after the by-elections due to a rule requiring voter turnout of more than 50% for an election to be valid, no BPF representative was elected to the new Supreme Soviet. Previously, a bill had also been blocked from being signed that would transition parliament to a proportional-majority system using party lists. Pazniak had run in Smarhon, receiving 47% of the vote, the other candidate 40%, and 13% voted against either candidate. As a result, since neither candidate had received 50%, the election was declared invalid and Pazniak did not win a seat in the new Supreme Soviet. Subsequently, Siarhei Navumchyk wrote about the election in his autobiography, stating that the number against both candidates was unrealistic, as usually no more than 5% of voters ever voted that option, and stated that stacks of ballots appeared from nowhere, but this claim has never been verified.

== 1994 presidential election ==
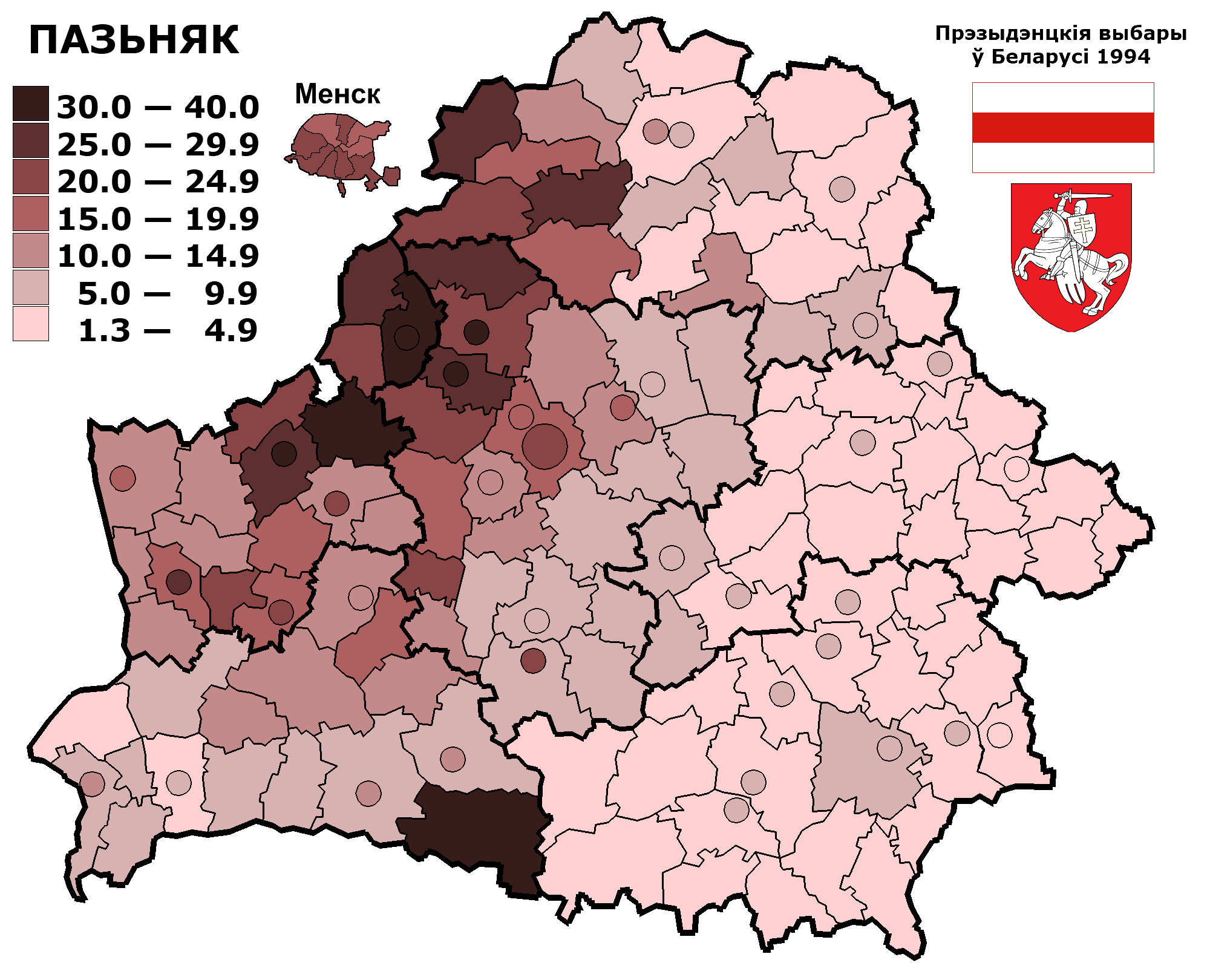
First round votes for Pazniak, 1994 presidential election

In 1994, he participated in the 1994 election as the Belarusian Popular Front nominee, gaining 13.1 percent of the vote. Pazniak's candidacy was supported by the famous Belarusian writer Vasil Bykaŭ and a number of representatives of the Belarusian scientific community.

The CSCE, in their report on the election, stated that Pazniak was the strongest advocate for free-market economics and the supremacy of Belarusian cultural and language over Russian. He rejected any entente with Russia, which led many to accuse him of being too nationalistic. His opponents quickly accused him of being an extremist who sought to steer the country into uncharted political waters. The minority Russian speakers feared Belarusianization, which made Lukashenko seem like the best of alternatives. At the end of the 1994 campaign, Pazniak attempted to moderate his image, publishing position paper in which he wrote to non-Belarusians to calm them about his policies. In the newspaper of "Sovetskaya Belorussia" on 16 June he detailed his more moderated plans: a creation of a market economy, healthcare for vulnerable people, and an independent, neutral, and nuclear-free state. He continued his opposition of Belarus joining CSTO and was against any form of union with Russia.

On 23 June the results of the first round of voting were released, with Pazniak receiving 12.82% of the vote, which was seen as an unexpected defeat for the current administration. In opinion polls prior to the election, he had received a similar percentage at 11.6%. The highest areas he got support from were the Grodno region with 21.21% of the vote and Minsk, where he received 20.98% of the vote. He received majority support in the major cities of Maladzyechna and Lida. He received little support in the Gomel region with 6.33% of the vote and in the Mogilev region with 4.68%. On 10 July, the second round was released, with the turnout being 10% lower. Since it was a two-round system and he was not part of the top two vote-getters, Vyacheslav Kebich faced Lukashenko with 14.17% of the vote to the former and 80.34% to the latter.

Pazniak later commented on the election's anniversary, alleging that the true results were falsified due to the influence of Russia and the FSB. He claimed that he had actually advanced to the second round - not Kebich - with 22% of the vote, and asserted that both Lukashenko and Kebich were Russian agents who prevented him from gaining power. Political figures later commented on his loss: for example, Alyaksandr Milinkevich stated he did not vote for Pazniak, finding him "too nationally orientated", while Valery Karbalevich argued Pazniak failed to broaden his appeal to moderate voters.

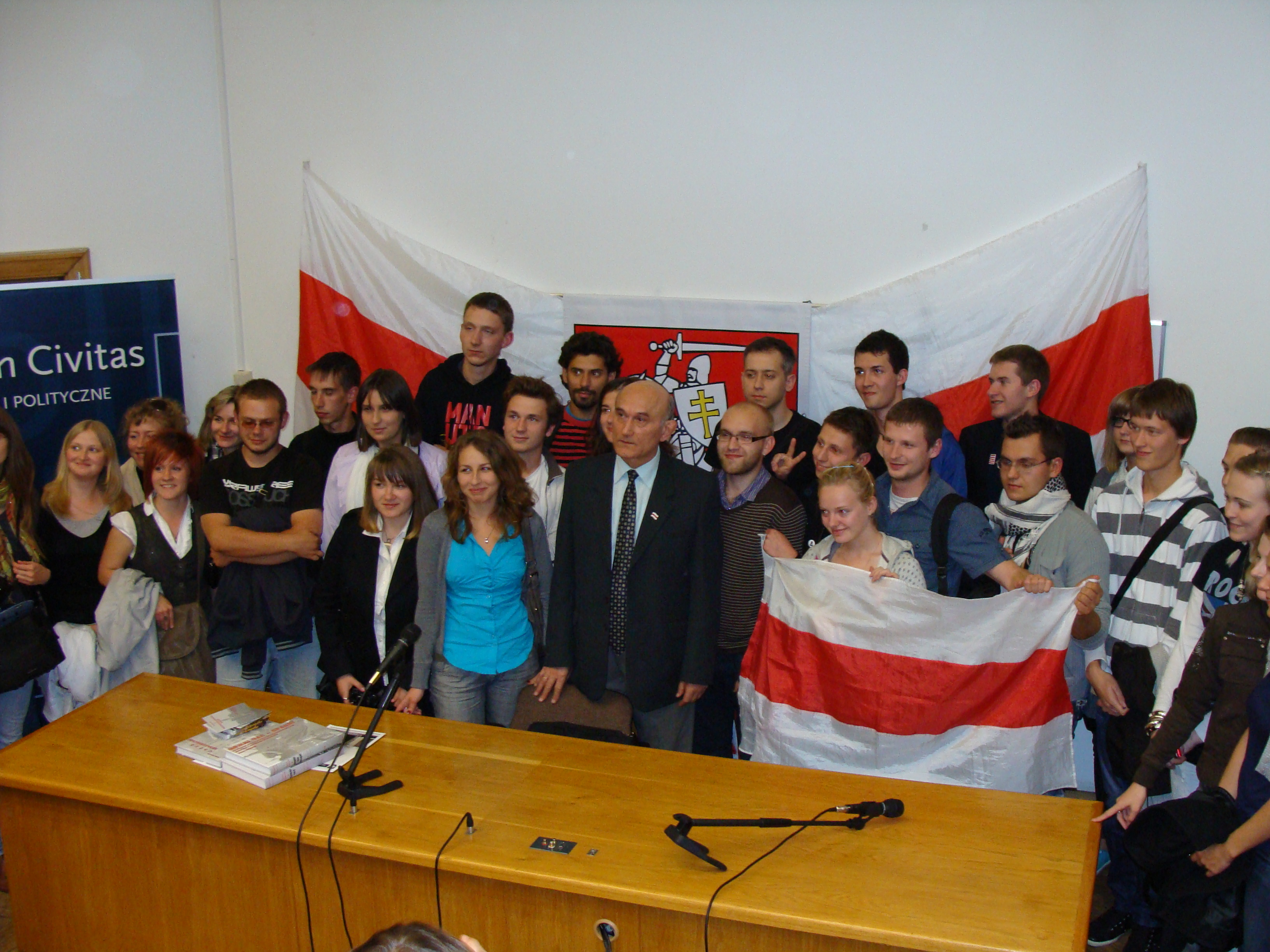
Pazniak with Belarusian students in Warsaw, 2011

Pazniak reads Kastuś Kalinoŭski's letter, 2013

== Exile and international advocacy ==
=== Chernobyl Way and start of exile ===
Following the start of Minsk Spring protests against the creation of a Union State, Pazniak fled into hiding with Siarhei Navumchyk on 25 March 1996. He informed his wife in a letter that he was being "hunted by security forces" and had to go underground. He stated they were going to be charged criminally for organizing Minsk Spring, and that agents stood outside the BPF headquarters and received summons. They subsequently fled together through Russia to Kyiv, initially intending to remain in exile for only a few weeks to brief European leaders on Lukashenko's repressive actions. Eventually, Pazniak briefly returned to Minsk on 26 April to participate in the rally Chernobyl Way to commemorate the Chernobyl disaster. During the rally, he led a moment of silence for Chechen president Dzhokhar Dudayev following his assassination. This act was highly controversial and damaged Pazniak's reputation, as many Belarusian disapproved due to the violence associated with the Battle of Grozny.

Upon reaching the BPF headquarters after the rally, special forces, allegedly under the instructions of KGB chairman Vladimir Matskevich and the Deputy Interior Minister, stormed the building and attempted to detain him; Pazniak successfully escaped. According to Pazniak, a directive appeared at border checkpoints to detain him upon entry, which he stated in the newspaper Narodnaya Volya in August 1996. In early May, Pazniak left the country and briefly stayed in Europe. He briefly stopped in Poland in May, where he controversially stated that Poland had historically oppressed Belarus and asserted that Belarusian national consciousness was solely a product of the Soviet Union. Afterwards, he went to the United States in July and requesting political asylum. The Ministry of Foreign Affairs responded that there was no political or physical persecution against Pazniak. On 23 August 1996, Pazniak was granted asylum, notably becoming the first case of a citizen of a post-Soviet country to receive asylum in the United States for political reasons since the collapse of the Soviet Union. After arriving, on 26 August, he announced he planned to continue to be in opposition, but instead try to focus on international attention on human rights violations in Belarus and mobilize Belarusians living abroad. He also thought that he would not stay in the United States long, predicting the Lukashenko regime would "only last a year or so".

On 19 June 1997, Belarus's prosecutor's office opened a criminal case against Pazniak, accusing him of incitement to ethnic hatred against the Russian people. They stated that this occurred in the newspapers Pahonia and Svaboda, which was a criminal case under Article 71 of the Criminal Code. Proceedings against the case were eventually suspended, as the prosecutors could not charge him, given that he was living outside of Belarus, and a final decision could only be made following an interrogation in Belarus. In November 1997, he confirmed that the main objective of the BPF at the time was to force the resignation of Lukashenko, since he stated it was impossible to do an impeachment process under his regime. He stated that afterwards, BPF intended to abolish the presidency and create a parliamentary republic.

=== Breakup of BPF and diaspora leadership ===
For the first two years of his emigration, Pazniak managed the BPF remotely, communicating solely through fax messages. During the 1999 Belarusian presidential election, members of the opposition, including the BPF, tried to generate popular support. Pazniak was accused of disrupting the electoral campaign when he announced his candidacy but later withdrew, citing provocations. It has been theorized that this move was intended to prevent the other opposition candidate, former Prime Minister Mikhail Chigir, from consolidating support. Consequently, Pazniak began to lose support within the BPF because many viewed him as refusing to work with other political parties. Pazniak responded by attempting to portray himself as the only opposition candidate who could promote Belarus's independence, and he intensified his attacks on other opposition politicians, accusing them, including Chigir, of collaborating with Russia. However, even before the elections, Pazniak had already been unpopular among some members, due to his refusal to change his methods of perceiving the BPF as self-sufficient and making the other parties adapt, even though certain members of the BPF wanted to compromise with the other opposition party. Critics, including those who subsequently left the BPF, accused him of authoritarianism after he announced the replacement of all his deputies and the dissolution of the BPF's "discussion club".

In the end, this led to alternative candidates being put forth for the chairmanship of the BPF, including Vincuk Viačorka, the deputy head of the BPF. Viačorka and Pazniak both were unable to secure the majority of votes for the chairmanship. Pazniak's supporters held a separate congress and elected him chairman, formally splitting the party. Pazniak's group formed the right-wing Conservative Christian Party – BPF (KChP–BNF), while the opposing faction, led by Viačorka, retained the name BPF. However, Pazniak was isolated in dialogue because most members of the BPF migrated to the party under Viačorka, including prominent BPF politicians like Lyavon Barshchewski, although he retained a small group of loyal supporters to his cause. In November, Pazniak commented from Warsaw that the roots of the split traced back to the 1995 hunger strike, arguing that internal division had failed to break the BPF earlier but had paralyzed the Hramada party after 1997. He argued that the split was inevitable under a dictatorship due to reliance on foreign grants and limited national support from the bourgeois. He favored ideological purity and independence, according to him, while Viačorka wanted coalition-building.

==== Early 2000s ====
The KChP–BNF soon isolated itself from other opposition parties, accusing them of being Russian proxies advocating for democracy as a means to incorporate Belarus into Russia. In 2000, he initiated the party's long-term strategy by boycotting the 2000 Belarusian parliamentary election. He continued to post articles, however, including appearances in Narodnaya Volya in September which portrayed Soviet Belarus as a time of violence, Russification, and the destruction of cultures.

The CEC initially recorded 103,879 collected signatures, but only 73,917 were accepted. His registration was denied because the required threshold of 100,000 valid signatures was not met. His registration was eventually denied because they found that he did not submit the necessary signatures for the threshold of 100,000: although he had collected over 100,000 signatures, it that amount was never submitted. Subsequently, after the head of the OSCE Monitoring Group in Minsk that monitored the election, Hans-Georg Wieck, was publicly accused of interfering in Lukashenko's campaign by the government, Pazniak commented on the incident too. Pazniak criticized Wieck for attempting to secure government cooperation with the OSCE and for allegedly prioritizing German interests, arguing that this effectively helped legitimize Lukashenko's continued rule. He instead proposed that the OSCE name another head of the mission.

In 2004, he reflected his long-standing criticisms of opposition figures legitimizing Lukashenko. He stated that they should not have participated in every election. Regarding the referendum held that year, which allowed Lukashenko to run for a third term as president, despite him being constitutionally limited to two terms, he stated under no circumstances should the opposition have participated in that or the parliamentary elections. He argued that advising people to vote "no" instead of boycotting the referendum resulted in an "eternal president" and that the opposition therefore bore responsibility for the so-called dictatorship. Pazniak also commented on Ukraine’s Orange Revolution, which followed the 2004 Ukrainian presidential election there. During an interview at the time, he stated that Belarusians must pay attention to Ukraine because it was a natural ally. However, he stated that attempts for Ukraine to push for membership into the European Union were not needed. He states Europe was in a crisis on the verge of collapse because of a spiritual decline of Christianity and criticized Europe's acceptance of gay people, abortions, and euthanasia.

==== Jeans Revolution and Zianon-Hop ====
In January 2007, in the aftermath of the Jeans Revolution following the 2006 elections, an anonymous user published a poem on LiveJournal called "Zianon-Hop". It soon went viral as a protest during the time. According to the fictional poem, Pazniak returned to Belarus as a "mythological superhero" and freed his ally Pavel Sevyarynets and then started criticizing nonviolent resistance and rallied the population into a revolt. Eventually, according to the poem, the regime capitulated and became the "Grand Duchy of Lithuania–Belarus", and he then went on an offensive to capture Vilnius. Written in a quasi-rap style, the poem parodied classic American action films and contained extensive profanity (a style then uncommon in Belarusian-language rap). Due to this, it achieved virality in 2007 where it was copy and pasted extensively online.

However, Pazniak himself did not like the parody, stating that commenting on it was impossible due to its extensive profanity. More than a decade later, Pazniak stated he found the concept amusing but criticized the poem for being primarily written in Russian and for its excessive profanity. Other opposition figures commented on the parody: Adam Hlobus called it "hackwork," arguing it would have been taken more seriously had it been written in Belarusian, and criticized the writer for anonymity. Ales Michalevic noted its popularity stemmed from people wanting "simple answers to complex questions," while Lavon Volski suggested its humor provided relief from the political pressure faced by young people.

==== Late 2000s ====
In 2008, he was a founding signatory of the Prague Declaration on European Conscience and Communism, which condemned the crimes of communist regimes. He also condemned the meeting between Lukashenko and Russian President Dmitry Medvedev in Sochi. Pazniak viewed it as part of a Russian pressure campaign to deploy troops and missiles in Belarus, arguing that it signaled a loss of Belarusian independence and drawing parallels to the recent Russo-Georgian War. Upon the European Union attempting engagement with the government again in 2008 and the government joining the Eastern Partnership, Pazniak strongly criticized the union. He stated it was self-serving and abandoning democratic ideals for the union to engage with Lukashenko, especially with the union extending an invitation to Lukashenko to attend a summit in Prague on behalf of Javier Solana. He controversially equated the EU's engagement to the Munich Agreement, arguing that the Union was "appeasing" Lukashenko in the way Adolf Hitler was appeased.

=== Continued opposition in the 2010s ===
Ahead of the 2010 Belarusian presidential election, Pazniak once again called for a boycott, asserting that the election would only be legitimate if Lukashenko did not participate. He stated that not boycotting would help the regime carry out falsifications. He called on all the opposition parties and people to withdraw from the elections the day before them too. The 2010 election was followed by massive protests on 19 December, during which more than 600 people were arrested. Among those arrested were prominent opposition figures and presidential candidates including Uladzimir Niakliayeu.

Later on during the mid-2010s, Pazniak remained active through cultural activities. In November 2015, two of Pazniak's books were identified as allegedly containing signs of extremism and were subsequently classified as extremist material. The General Prosecutor's Office concluded that the books included passages allegedly inciting hostility or undermining state order. The books in question were "Good Photography" and "Kurapaty Defense. People's Memorial." In the next presidential election, the 2015 Belarusian presidential election, Pazniak continued his boycotting strategy while the split-off BPF party endorsed Tatsyana Karatkevich. On 19 June 2017, he was unanimously re-elected as Chairman of the Conservative Christian Party – BPF at its XI Congress, which was held in Minsk and attended by 101 delegates.

=== 2020s and protests ===
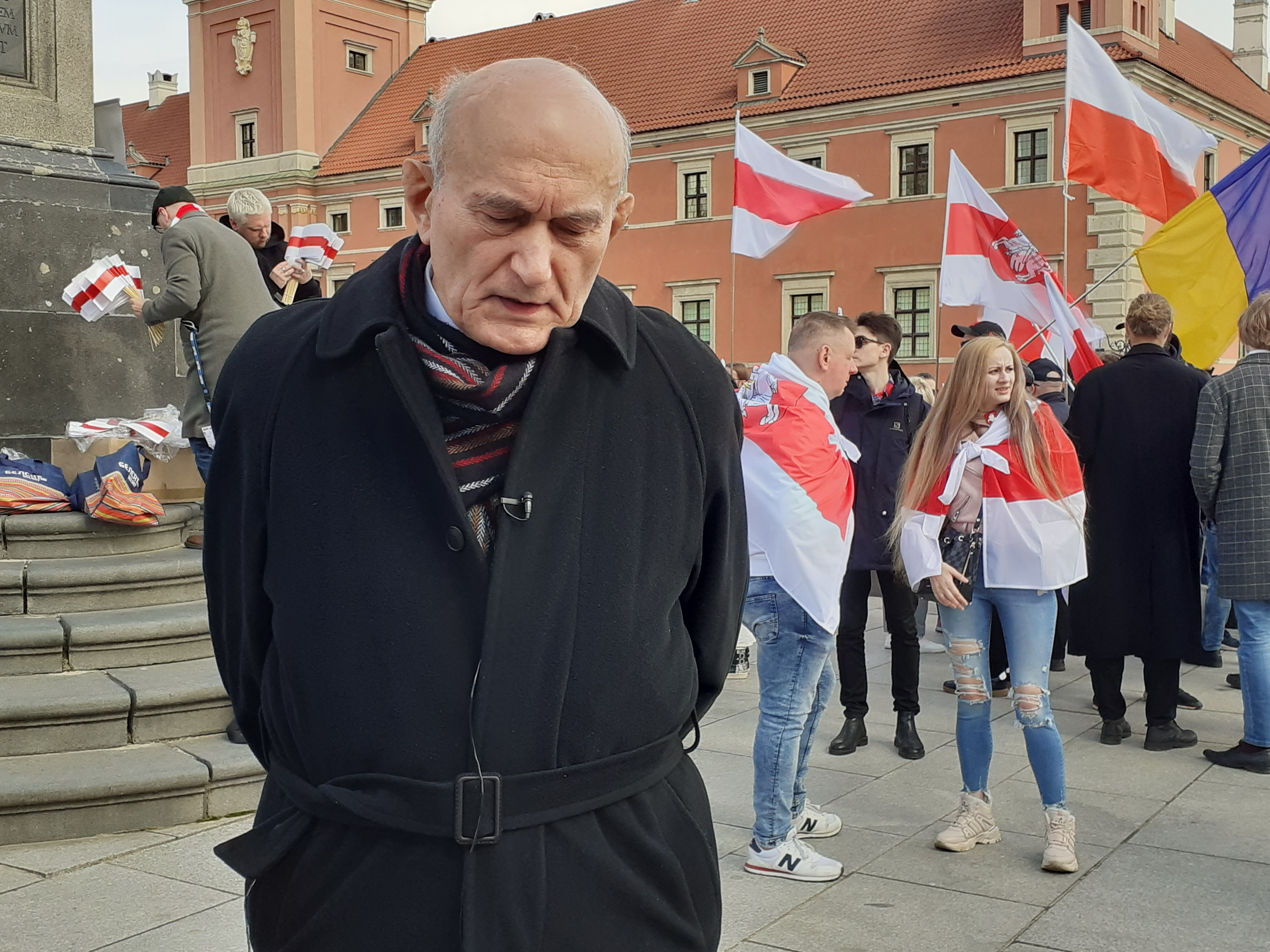
Pazniak during Freedom Day celebrations in Warsaw in 2023.

In 2018, Pazniak received the Belarusian Democratic Republic 100th Jubilee Medal from the Rada of the Belarusian Democratic Republic in Exile. Prior to the 2020 Belarusian presidential election, Pazniak asserted that Viktar Babaryka and Valery Tsepkalo were Russian-backed candidates, despite presenting themselves as alternatives to Lukashenko. He also stated that Statkevich was a provocateur of the 2010 clashes, and offered slight praise for Sviatlana Tsikhanouskaya for disrupting the political stagnation, but he maintained his call for a boycott.

During the 2020 Belarusian protests, Pazniak applauded the youth for showcasing political sentiment but simultaneously criticized them, stating that young people "decide nothing in politics". He stated only real change would come from the working class protesting. In October 2020, he also criticized the "People's Ultimatum" produced by Tsikhanouskaya, which stated Lukashenko must resign, street violence must stop, and all political prisoners must be released. He called it "inadequate," criticizing Tsikhanouskaya for positioning herself as the protest leader and arguing that the ultimatum was a provocation that would only lead to harsher crackdowns. He accused her of "political infantilism" and "playing Sveta games". Previously, he had praised her as a positive candidate ahead of the 2020 elections, but later stated she had been manipulated during the protests. Pazniak also claimed he attempted to contact Tsikhanouskaya about her views but was blocked; Tsikhanouskaya, however, stated she did not recall these attempts.

Pazniak later claimed that Russia was planning a coup d'état in Belarus in 2020. He alleged that Putin intended to support the protestors and push for "free elections" to install a pro-Russian candidate, such as Viktar Babaryka, as the head of state.

In the summer of 2020, Pazniak founded the association Free Belarus, which states its purpose is to "advocate for the protection, development and representation of the Belarusian nation, the Republic of Belarus and Belarusians around the world". Upon founding it, he appealed to the International Court of Justice to recognize Belarus as an occupied country under Russian control, and proposed that the Rada of the Belarusian Democratic Republic (BNR Rada) could act as an initiator in the appeal to the ICJ. In 2023, he announced plans to create a Belarusian Security Council in exile alongside representatives of the Kastuś Kalinoŭski Regiment. The body is intended to coordinate defense and security matters and complement existing opposition structures.

== Views ==
=== Domestic policy ===
==== Sanctions ====
Pazniak has argued that the debate framing "sanctions versus negotiations" is misleading. He has argued that economic sanctions against Belarus will not succeed in toppling Lukashenko; instead, they risk deepening Belarus's economic dependence on Russia and isolating the country from the West. He has pointed to examples like Cuba and Venezuela, where external sanctions have failed to make leaders step down, and has stressed that it would be more difficult on Belarus because of Russia's support.

At the same time, he has argued that negotiations could be a way to stop repression. However, Pazniak has not specified how these may work, and some critics have denounced this by arguing that Lukashenko has shown little willingness to make genuine concessions. Past dialogues have ended with opposition figures imprisoned, according to critics, and a hypothetical deal would skew towards Lukashenko's interests, like lifting sanctions in exchange for a token gesture. Pazniak has concluded that neither sanctions nor negotiations are the solution, asserting that real change must instead come from internal action within Belarus, rather than relying on the West or Russia.

==== Religion ====
Pazniak has openly identified as Catholic and has stated Christianity is a cultural tradition uniting Belarusians. He has portrayed the Uniate Church as a "martyr church" whose revival is central to a Belarusian national identity. While denouncing the Russian Orthodox Church as complicit in Russification, he has supported the establishment of a Belarusian autocephalous Orthodox Church.

==== COVID-19 pandemic ====
During the early onslaught of the COVID-19 pandemic in 2020, Pazniak claimed that Belarus was underreporting the amount of infections and deaths, and that hospitals were not ordered to test in severe cases. He specifically condemned the government's policy of banning masks in schools, refusing to implement social distancing, and dismissing the pandemic as a mere "panic". He argued that only a coalition government of politicians, scientists, economists, and medical professionals could adequately confront the epidemic. He later expanded on those warnings, predicting that there would be tens of thousands of deaths if the denial about the pandemic went on, and that deliberately hiding the scale of the pandemic would endanger the population.

=== Foreign policy ===
==== Russia ====
Pazniak has been characterized as vehemently anti-Russian, with some critics labeling him as Russophobic. He has stated that Russia has never done anything good for Belarus, and that any slightly pro-Russian candidate for president will be worse for Belarus. In 1993, before the Belarusian presidential elections, ultra-nationalist right-wing leader of the Liberal Democratic Party of Russia, Vladimir Zhirinovsky, won 23% of the seats in the State Duma. He cited this as proof that Russia could not democratize, asserting that there was little distinction between the perceived moderate Boris Yeltsin and Zhirinovsky. He also stated that Zhirinovsky winning so much proved Russian imperialism always posed an existential threat to Belarus, and that Russia was willing to interfere in the affairs of any post-Soviet countries in the pretext of protecting Russian speakers. He also promised he would bring pro-Russian officials to account and initiate the withdrawal of Russian troops. Regarding domestic policies, he stated that some areas that Russia controlled, including the Smolensk region, were actually eastern Belarusian territories. (Likely based on the Belarusian Democratic Republic's claim to Smolensk). He has since then repeatedly accused both the current Belarusian regime and other members of the opposition of being proxies of Russia. He asserted that Belarus was under imperial bondage by Russia and favored linking Belarus with Ukraine and the Baltic states.

Pazniak has been highly critical of the Russian opposition to Putin, stating after Alexei Navalny's death that Navalny was an "imperialist who hated a free Belarus" and would have surpassed Putin in that regard if given the chance. He stated Navalny's real influence on Russian politics was zero. On Alexei's wife, Yulia Navalnaya, and called her a puppet of Putin and the FSB, and an imperialist also.

==== Germany ====
He has accused certain German political circles of being willing to give up Belarus to Russia for economic benefits like cheap transit routes for gas and goods. He states Germany views Belarus as a source of cheap labor and talent, and states that Germany uses its influence within the European Union to shape Eastern European geopolitics. He suggested that Germany seeks to impose order on Eastern Europe and wants Poland to border Russia via the Bug River (instead of Belarus) to strengthen Polish dependence on the EU.

==== European Union ====
Pazniak has been highly critical of the European Union. Pazniak recalled speaking with European politicians in the late 1990s, saying that, unlike the Americans, they failed to grasp Belarus's situation and demonstrated an "infantilism" regarding Russia. He called the union a giant bureaucratic monster. He has rejected the German-French concept of a centralized European federation, arguing that it lacks a shared spiritual foundation and has abandoned Christian traditions, which he believes will lead to the Union's eventual demise. He instead supported sovereign nations in Europe that still share values, but not a uniformity and envisioned a feature that was closely in line to the Scandinavian and Baltic countries.

He has extensively criticized the EU economic sanctions on Belarus, which he says put Belarus's sovereignty in danger and make Lukashenko want to build a closer relationship with Russia. He has also criticized the European Union's response to past presidential elections, arguing that their response used vague, bureaucratic language that ultimately legitimized the results and "deepened Belarus's subjugation".

==== United States ====
In 2025, he commented on the relations with the United States. He stated that the current administration's publicly neutral stance and its decision not to openly push Russia out of Belarus was strategically effective. He said U.S. envoy Keith Kellogg showed he was aware of this, and the strategic goal was to gradually detach Belarus from Russia.

He has been a supporter of President Donald Trump, calling his moves rational diplomacy. He called him a "lapidary genius" and the "best president in American history," citing Trump's support for traditional values and opposition to "hated leftists". He stated he was very pleased that he began to "save America" because he wanted talked about eliminating talks about gender in the Department of Education. In his private blog, he wrote that President Biden's presidency was causing burnout due to "liberal social and progressive discrimination," and he praised Trump for addressing illegal immigration at the Mexican border.

==== Ukraine ====
Pazniak has been pro-Ukrainian. During the early 2000s with the Orange Revolution after the 2004 election there, he at the time supported the Ukrainian opposition against the pro-Russian president, Leonid Kuchma. He called Ukraine a natural ally, but opposed attempts for Ukraine to join the European Union.

During the Russian invasion of Ukraine in 2022, Pazniak called to support the Kastuś Kalinoŭski Regiment. In January 2023, during the Battle of Bakhmut, he visited the Belarusian fighters of the Kastuś Kalinoŭski Regiment on the front line. Pazniak had previously assisted the regiment by helping to arrange equipment, including a minibus and drones. There he also discussed the future of Belarus. He also stated during the Russian invasion of Ukraine that while Russia supports peace talks in Minsk, Ukraine would not agree because of the past negative experiences during the talks in 2015. However, he said it was important for Ukraine to have a democratic and neutral Belarus for regional security. Regarding Donald Trump, Pazniak called it a "farce" that the American president supports Putin, attributing this to the influence of "democratic, leftist agents." Pazniak asserted that Trump only praised Moscow to initiate negotiations and had only called Putin first because Russia was a superpower and would be offended otherwise.

== Legacy and reputation ==
Pazniak is considered the founder of Belarus’s national project to align with the West. Scholars have argued that his legacy is inseparable from the country's independence movement, positioning him as a visionary nationalist whose role in creating the BPF was pivotal. Scholars have argued, therefore, that his legacy is tied to the revival of national symbolism, language, and identity and that he has been a symbol of resistance in Belarus. In the Belarusian Political Science Review, Siarhiei Bohdan argued that Pazniak has unintentionally become the ideologist and embodiment of the National Democratic movement in Belarus, tying his legacy to national revival and anti-communism.

However, at the same time, Pazniak has been characterized as a deeply polarizing figure. Critics argue that his rigid ideological purity and refusal to compromise with broader coalitions have fragmented dissent, noting his repeated calls for boycotts have isolated him and his party from the wider democratic movement. Many Belarusian opposition figures have expressed dislike for Pazniak due to his frequent accusations that they are either pro-Lukashenko or pro-Russian. For example, after Pazniak released an expose in 2009, accusing well-known figures in the opposition of collaborating with Belarusian special services, BPF chairman Alaksiej Janukievich called him paranoid. He argued that Pazniak has often accused outsiders of his party of being agents, creating an atmosphere of distrust. He concluded that Pazniak's tendency to see infiltration among the Belarusian opposition has undermined unity and credibility within the opposition.

Older generations of Belarusians typically have remembered him for his parliamentary work and for leading mass rallies in Minsk, while younger Belarusians typically only know him through caricatures or memes, leading to a mixed reputation. His exile since 1996 has been argued to both be a strength and a weakness: on one hand, supporters have stated this maintains ideological clarity, while critics say he has lost direct influence over domestic politics and that he has not had active leadership on the ground since then. Pazniak remained for a long time as the most popular figure among Belarusians in the diaspora, despite some labels of extremism.

Bohdan noted that Pazniak is often portrayed as a principled politician rather than a pragmatic one, with many critics denouncing his "us vs. them" polarization for failing to offer a unified vision for Belarus's future.

== Personal life ==
His wife is Halina Pazniak (Vaščanka), a former deputy of the Minsk City Council of Deputies. They have been married since 1995, and she lives in Warsaw. He also has a stepdaughter, Nadzieja, who trained as a reporter with "TV Belarus" in 2006, intending to become a news announcer.

== Honours and awards ==
In 2024 he was awarded the Order of the Pahonia, which is the highest award of the exiled Rada of the Belarusian Democratic Republic. He was also previously awarded the jubilee medal called the Belarusian Democratic Republic 100th Jubilee Medal.

In Vasil Bykaŭ's work called "Integration", he depicted a character named Spazniak as Pazniak, who in the narrative was a committed nationalist who shoots himself in a symbolic gesture of martyrdom.

== See also ==
- Belarusian nationalism
- Stanislau Shushkevich
