= Belarusian Popular Front =

Belarusian sociopolitical movement

Belarusian Popular Front "Revival" Беларускі Народны Фронт "Адраджэньне"
- Logo used starting in 1993
- Abbreviation: БНФ, BPF, BNF
- Leader: Zianon Pazniak
- Founded: 25 June 1989
- Dissolved: 30 May 1993
- Succeeded by: BPF Party; Conservative Christian Party – BPF; Young Front
- Headquarters: Minsk
- Ideology: Liberal democracy Belarusian nationalism Anti-communism
- Political position: Centre-right
- Colours: white, red, white (Flag of the Belarusian Democratic Republic)

From 1993 on, the flag of the BPF was a variation on the flag of the Belarusian People's Republic with a Cross of Saint Euphrosyne

The Belarusian Popular Front "Revival" (BPF, Belarusian: Беларускі Народны Фронт "Адраджэньне", БНФ; Biełaruski Narodny Front "Adradžeńnie", BNF) was a social and political movement in Belarus in the late 1980s and 1990s whose goals were the national revival of Belarus, its democratization and independence from the Soviet Union. Its leader was Zianon Pazniak. It was similar to the Popular Fronts of Latvia and Estonia, and the Sąjūdis movement in Lithuania.

== Creation ==
The predecessor of the BPF was the civic organization "Martyrology of Belarus", whose goal was to commemorate the victims of Soviet political repressions in Belarus. Among the significant achievements of the organization was the 1988 uncovering by Pazniak of the burial site of Kurapaty near Minsk, a major NKVD mass extermination site of Soviet political prisoners in the 1930s.

The Belarusian Popular Front was established in 1989, following the examples of the Popular Fronts in the Baltic states. Its founding conference had to be organized in Vilnius because of pressure from the authorities of the Byelorussian SSR.

Initially, the Popular Front united numerous minor organizations promoting the Belarusian language and history. However, soon the movement began voicing political demands, supporting the Perestroika and democratization in the Soviet Union which would enable a Belarusian national revival. The Popular Front was the first political organization in Belarus to openly oppose the Communist Party of Byelorussia.

The prominent Belarusian writer Vasil Bykaŭ became an active member of the Belarusian Popular Front. Writer Aleś Adamovič was an active supporter of the Popular Front.

The Front had about 10 thousand activists in different regions of Belarus as well as in Moscow, Vilnius and Riga. It published a newspaper, Навіны БНФ "Адраджэньне" (News of the Belarusian Popular Front "Revival").

The Belarusian Popular Front actively protested against Soviet policies following the Chernobyl accident, after which a large territory of Belarus was contaminated by nuclear fallout.

== In the parliament of Belarus ==
In May 1990, 37 members of the Belarusian Popular Front were elected into the 12th Belarusian Supreme Council and formed a dynamic opposition group in the parliament of the then Soviet-controlled Byelorussian Soviet Socialist Republic.

In July 1990, the Belarusian Popular Front initiated the passing of the Declaration of State Sovereignty of the Byelorussian Soviet Socialist Republic. In August 1991, following the 1991 Soviet coup d'état attempt and supported by tens of thousands of protesters outside the parliament building, the Belarusian Popular Front managed to convince the Supreme Soviet to declare full independence of Belarus from the USSR. The historical Belarusian national symbols: the white-red-white flag and the Pahonia coat of arms were restored as state symbols of Belarus.

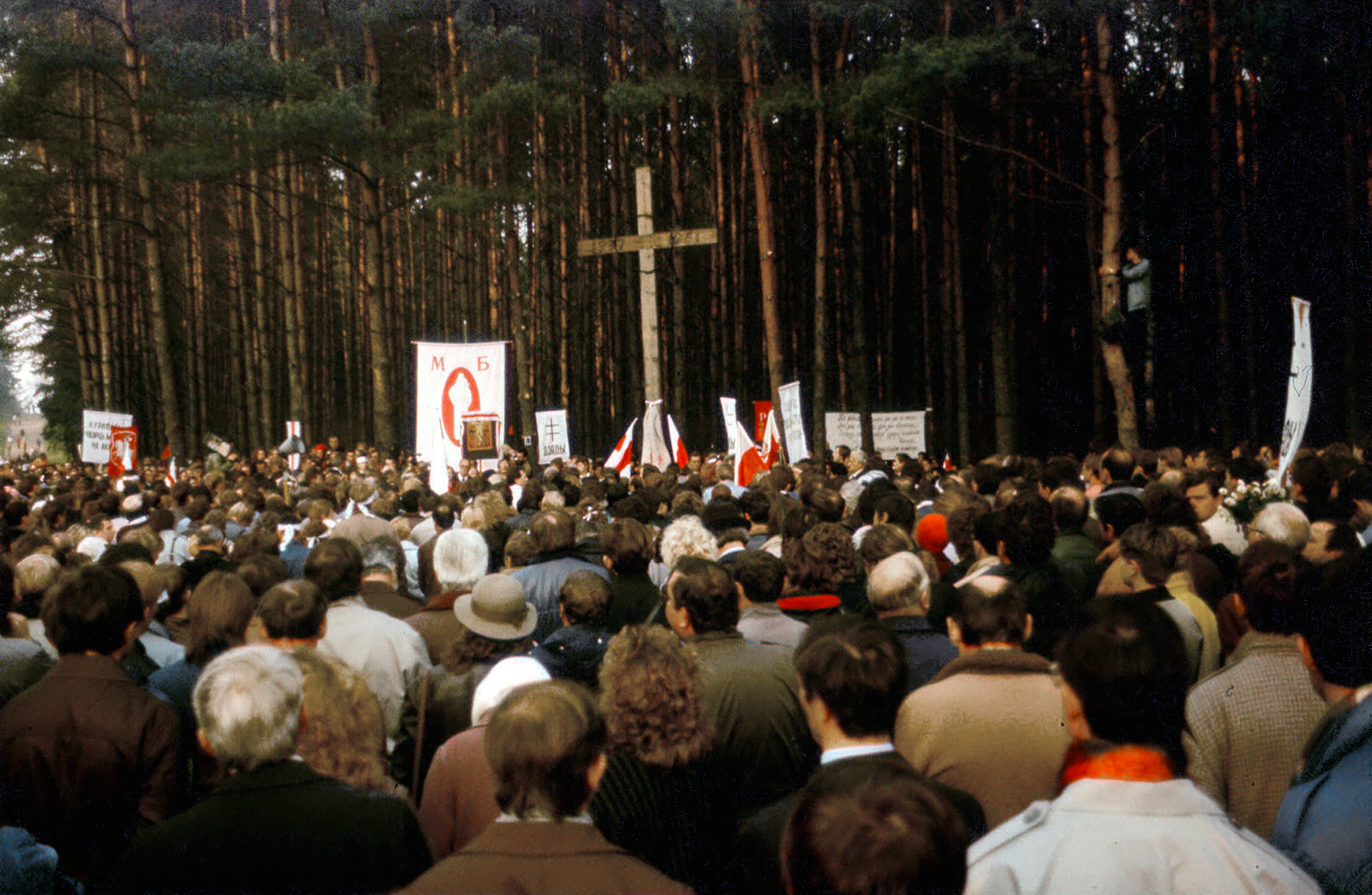
A meeting in Kurapaty in 1989 organized by the Belarusian Popular Front

== Opposition to the regime of Alexander Lukashenko ==
In 1994, Alexander Lukashenko was elected president of Belarus. From the very beginning, the Belarusian Popular Front became one of the main political forces opposing president Lukashenko. In 1994, the BPF formed a shadow cabinet consisting of 100 BPF intellectuals.

In 1995, members of parliament from the Belarusian Popular Front went on a hunger strike as a protest against Lukashenko's controversial referendum to replace state symbols with slightly amended Soviet ones and to make Russian language official in Belarus. The hunger strike was violently interrupted by police forces who beat up the members of parliament.

In 1996, the Belarusian Popular Front was one of the main powers behind mass protests against Lukashenko's policies of Russification and integration with Russia, as well as against his second controversial referendum amending the constitution in a way to concentrate power in the president's hands. The protests were violently dispersed by the police. Two leaders of the Belarusian Popular Front, Zianon Pazniak and Siarhiej Navumčyk, fled the country and received political asylum in the United States.

== Split ==
In 1999, the Belarusian Popular Front split into two rival organizations. Its conservative wing under the exiled leader Zianon Pazniak formed the Conservative Christian Party – BPF (Kanservatyŭna-Chryścijanskaja Partyja BNF), while the moderate majority formed the BPF Party (Partyja BNF, Партыя БНФ) led by Vincuk Viačorka.

Both parties claim to be the only legitimate successor of the Belarusian Popular Front established in 1989. The Malady Front, formerly the Popular Front's youth wing, has also become an autonomous organization.

In 2011, following an internal conflict, more than 90 further members left the BPF Party, including several veterans of the original Belarusian Popular Front, including Lavon Barščevski, Jury Chadyka, and Vincuk Viačorka. This was described by some as a "second split" of the Belarusian Popular Front.

Formally, the Belarusian Popular Front continued to exist as an NGO affiliated with the BPF Party. In 2023 the BPF Party as well as the Conservative Christian Party – BPF were both liquidated by the Supreme Court of Belarus.

== Notable former members ==
- Vasil Bykaŭ, writer, Nobel prize nominee
- Ryhor Baradulin, poet and writer, Nobel prize nominee
- Siarhiej Navumčyk, vice president of the Rada of the Belarusian Democratic Republic in Exile
- Aleś Bialacki, human rights activist and political prisoner
- Piatro Sadoŭski, Belarus' first ambassador to Germany
- Pavał Sieviaryniec, Christian Democratic politician and political prisoner
- Jaŭhien Kulik, graphic designer, author of the Coat of arms of Belarus adopted in 1991
- Uładzimier Arłoŭ, writer
- Jaŭhien Šatochin, artist

== See also ==
- People's Movement of Ukraine
- Popular Front of Latvia
- Popular Front of Estonia
- Sąjūdis
