= History of Belarus (1991–present) =

History of Belarus after the dissolution of the USSR

Republic of Belarus Рэспубліка Беларусь
- 1991–present
- Top: Flag (1991–95); Bottom: Flag (1995–present; slightly modified in 2012) Top: Coat of arms (1991–95); Bottom: Emblem (1995–present; slightly modified in 2020)
- Anthem: Дзяржаўны гімн Рэспублікі Беларусь (Belarusian); Dziaržaŭny himn Respubliki Biełaruś "State Anthem of the Republic of Belarus"
- Belarus in green.
- Capital and largest city: Minsk; 53°55′N 27°33′E
- Official language and national language: Belarusian; Russian (since 1995)
- Ethnic groups (2019): 84.9% Belarusians; 7.5% Russians; 3.1% Poles; 1.7% Ukrainians; 2.8% other
- Religion (2020): 91.0% Christianity; —83.3% Russian Orthodoxy; —7.7% Other Christian; 7.8% No religion; 1.2% Others
- Demonym: Belarusian
- Government: Unitary parliamentary republic (1991–1994); Unitary semi-presidential republic (1994–present): under an authoritarian dictatorship (1996–present)
- Chairman of the Supreme Council/President
  - 1991–1994: Stanislav Shushkevich
  - 1994: Vyacheslav Kuznetsov (acting)
  - 1994: Myechyslaw Hryb
  - 1994–present: Alexander Lukashenko (Note: Some countries, especially Western nations, do not recognise Lukashenko as the legitimate president of Belarus since the 2020 Belarusian presidential election. However, he continues to have de facto control over Belarus, being supported by Russia and China and by suppressing internal opposition.)
- Prime Minister
  - 1991–1994: Vyacheslav Kebich (first)
  - 2025–present: Alexander Turchin (current)
- Legislature: Supreme Council (1991–1996); National Assembly (1996–present)
  - Upper house: Council of the Republic (1996–present)
  - Lower house: House of Representatives (1996–present)

Independence from the Soviet Union
  - 1990 Supreme Soviet election: March–May 1990
  - BSSR sovereignty: 27 July 1990
  - Independence: 25 August 1991
  - Renamed: 19 September 1991
  - Belavezha Accords USSR dissolves: 8 December 1991; 26 December 1991
  - Current constitution: 15 March 1994
  - 1994 presidential election: 23 June – 10 July 1994
  - Lukashenko inaugurated: 20 July 1994
  - 1995 referendum: 14 May 1995
  - 1996 referendum: 24 November 1996
  - Last constitutional referendum: 27 February 2022
  - Belarusian partisan movement: 9 August 2020 – present

Area
  - Total: 207,600 km^{2} (80,200 sq mi) (including swamps)

Population
  - 2025 estimate: ▼9,109,280; (98th)
  - Density: 43.9/km^{2} (113.7/sq mi) (130th)
- GDP (PPP): 2023 estimate
  - Total: ▲$221.186 billion (73rd)
  - Per capita: ▲$24,016 (71st)
- GDP (nominal): 2023 estimate
  - Total: ▼$68.864 billion (74th)
  - Per capita: ▼$7,477 (82nd)
- Gini (2019): ▼25.3 low inequality (65th)
- HDI (2023): ▲0.824 very high (52nd)
- Currency: Belarusian ruble (BYN)
- Time zone: UTC+3
- Calling code: +375
- ISO 3166 code: BY
- Internet TLD: .by; .бел
Preceded by
Soviet Union; Byelorussian SSR
- Today part of: Belarus

The modern history of Belarus began with the dissolution of the Soviet Union in 1991. The new Belarusian country struggled with many problems, including post-Soviet debt, nuclear arsenal, and inflation. These factors contributed to the current history of the Republic of Belarus, especially to the current leadership under Alexander Lukashenko, under whom the country's democracy backslided and later turned into a full authoritarian dictatorship.

== Historical context ==
The lands of present-day Belarus have been part of many states over the centuries, including the Kievan Rus' (especially the Duchy of Polotsk, which is considered the predecessor of Belarusian statehood) from 9th to early 14th century, the Grand Duchy of Lithuania from 14 to 16th century, whose elites, despite being of Lithuanian origin, became ruthenized (or belarusianized), then the Polish-Lithuanian Commonwealth from the 16th to 18th century, which caused polonisation of the nobility and parts of burghers, the Russian Empire in the 19th century, which began russification (especially after November and January Uprisings, in which Belarusians fought alongside Poles and Lithuanians against the tsarist occupation). Belarusian territory became a centre of the World War I, Polish-Soviet War, and World War II, during which Belarusians tried either to create their own state (which they briefly established in 1918-1919 as a Belarusian People's Republic), collaborated with Poland, with the Soviet Union, or with Nazi Germany. Ultimately, the USSR managed to incorporate it into its borders as a Byelorussian Soviet Socialist Republic, ruled by the Communist Party of Byelorussia, a regional branch of the only legal Soviet Communist Party (CPSU) in the entire Soviet Union. The region experienced repression from the communist regime, especially under Stalin in 1937-1938, 1940-1941, and from 1945 to mid-1950s.

== Perestroika ==
The political changes in Belarus began in the era of Perestroika, a Soviet political reform movement promoted by the First Secretary Mikhail Gorbachev. Censorship became relaxed, the new Soviet authorities freed political prisoners, and the cultural renewal together with the emerging opposition movements.

In 1988, archaeologist Zianon Pazniak discovered the bodies of people killed during the Stalinist Great Purge of 1937-1938. On 19 October 1988, Pazniak convened a meeting with other nationalists at the Minsk House of Cinema (now the Red Church) to create an organizing committee of the Belarusian Popular Front (BPF) and also the movement "Martyrology of Belarus" to document repressions in the USSR. The BPF was modeled after popular fronts in the Baltics. Soon after this, thousands of people in Minsk marched to Kurapaty in what came to be known as Dziady-88, spurred by the committee's revelations. During the events of Dziady-88, Pazniak proposed the idea of a cross procession with a requiem being performed for the victims, which was implemented. Though the rally ended with arrests and tear gas, Pazniak managed to read the Front's declaration before being detained by Soviet police. The founding congress of the BPF took place in Vilnius from 24 June to 25 June 1989, as it was not permitted in Minsk, which was attended by about 400 delegates. A year later, the Belarusian Popular Front, a pro-Perestroika organization that later became clearly anti-communist.

After a modification of Article 6 of Soviet constitution that removed a line about a leading role and monopoly of the Communist Party, the USSR (including Soviet Belarus) officially ceased to be a one-party state. From March to May 1990, first competitive elections to the Supreme Soviet of Byelorussia took place. The opposition Belarusian Popular Front, led by Pazniak, won around 25–37 seats. Pazniak advocated for a clear separation of the democratic faction.

The Byelorussian Communist Party itself also experienced changes. On 27 July 1990, the Byelorussian Soviet Socialist Republic declared sovereignty, which was a part of the so-called "parade of sovereignties", in which many other Soviet republics, including Russian Soviet Federatice Socialist Republic, declared sovereignty from the Gorbachev's central authority. On 28 November 1990, Yefrem Sokolov was replaced by Anatoly Malofeyev in the position of First Secretary of the Communist Party of Byelorussia.

In April 1991, anti-government workers' strikes took place. Originally in opposition to price increases and a tax on goods from republics sold in another republic (which heavily affected the export-based Belarusian economy), the protests later turned into a broadly anti-Soviet movement, calling for the resignation of Soviet leadership, a reduction of the economic role of the Soviet government, and fresh elections to the Supreme Soviet. In result, wages increased and trust in the Communist authorities has fallen.

Against the backdrop of these economic crises, the Belarusian national revival began to emerge in the late 1980s and early 1990s, with symbols like white-red-white flag and Pahonia coat of arms reappearing at pro-democratic opposition demonstrations.

== Independence (1991–1994) ==
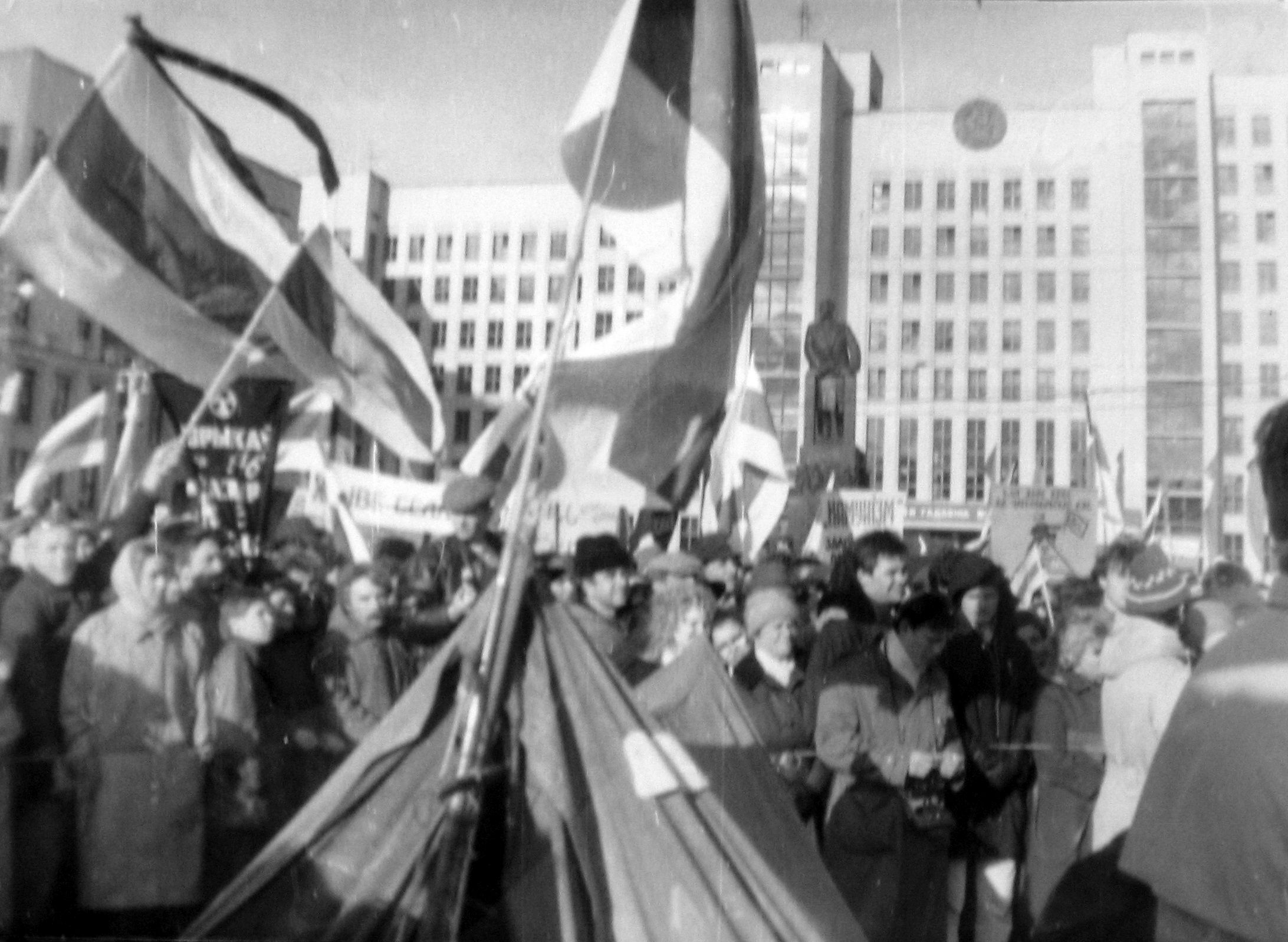
7 November 1990 demonstration against communism in front of the headquarter of the Supreme Soviet of the Byelorussian SSR (Government House).

During the August Coup in 1991, the Byelorussian Soviet Socialist Republic's branch of the Communist Party of the Soviet Union supported the putsch. However, once the coup failed, Chairman of the Supreme Council Nikolai Dementey (who was also first secretary of the Communist Party of Byelorussia) was forced to resign from his post, leading to the election of Stanislav Shushkevich, a scientist, who while a member of the CPSU, was not directly tied to the apparats. Alongside this, he was known previously for his criticism of the Soviet government's disregard for the Chernobyl Disaster and reformist, social democratic views.

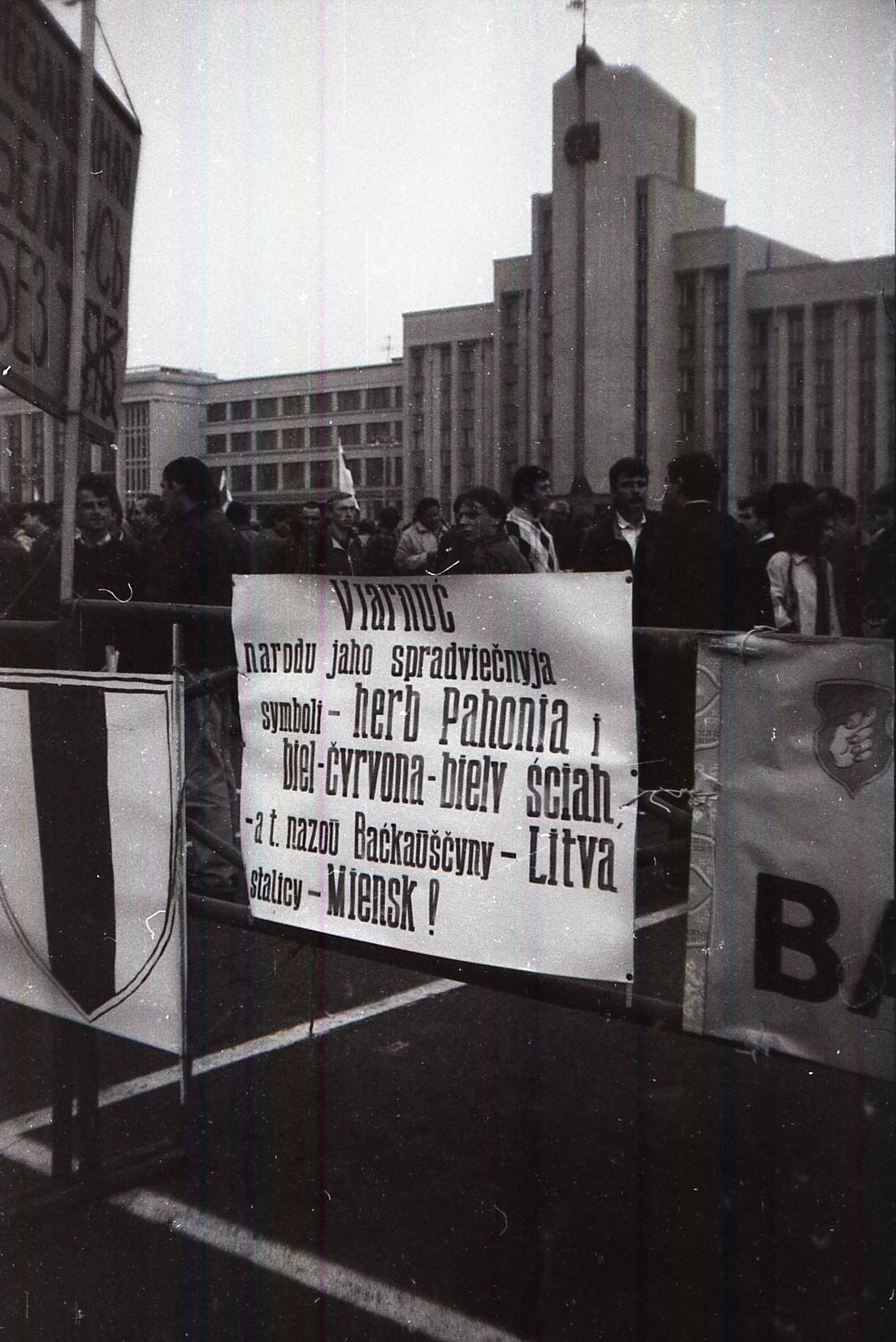
A picket in Minsk near the Government House with a poster in Belarusian Latin: "Return to the people their ancient symbols: the coat of arms of Pahonya and the white-red-white flag, as well as the name of the country LITHUANIA, the capital city - Minsk!" (September 19, 1991).

On August 25, 1991, the BSSR declared independence from the Soviet Union, becoming the Republic of Belarus. The White-red-white flag was re-adopted, alongside the Pahonia 19 September 1991. The CPB was briefly banned, alongside the larger Communist Party of the Soviet Union, while the USSR ceased to exist after Belovezha Accords on 8 December of the same year.

This period of a flawed democracy was known for tensions between reformist social democrats under Shushkevich who wanted a slow but successful transition to capitalism and positive relations with the West, hardline post-communists, pro-Russian Prime Minister Vyacheslav Kebich, and nationalist opposition under Pazniak.

Belarus experienced inflation and a crisis involving nuclear weapons, which were transferred to Russia as a part of the deal for neutralization of Belarus.

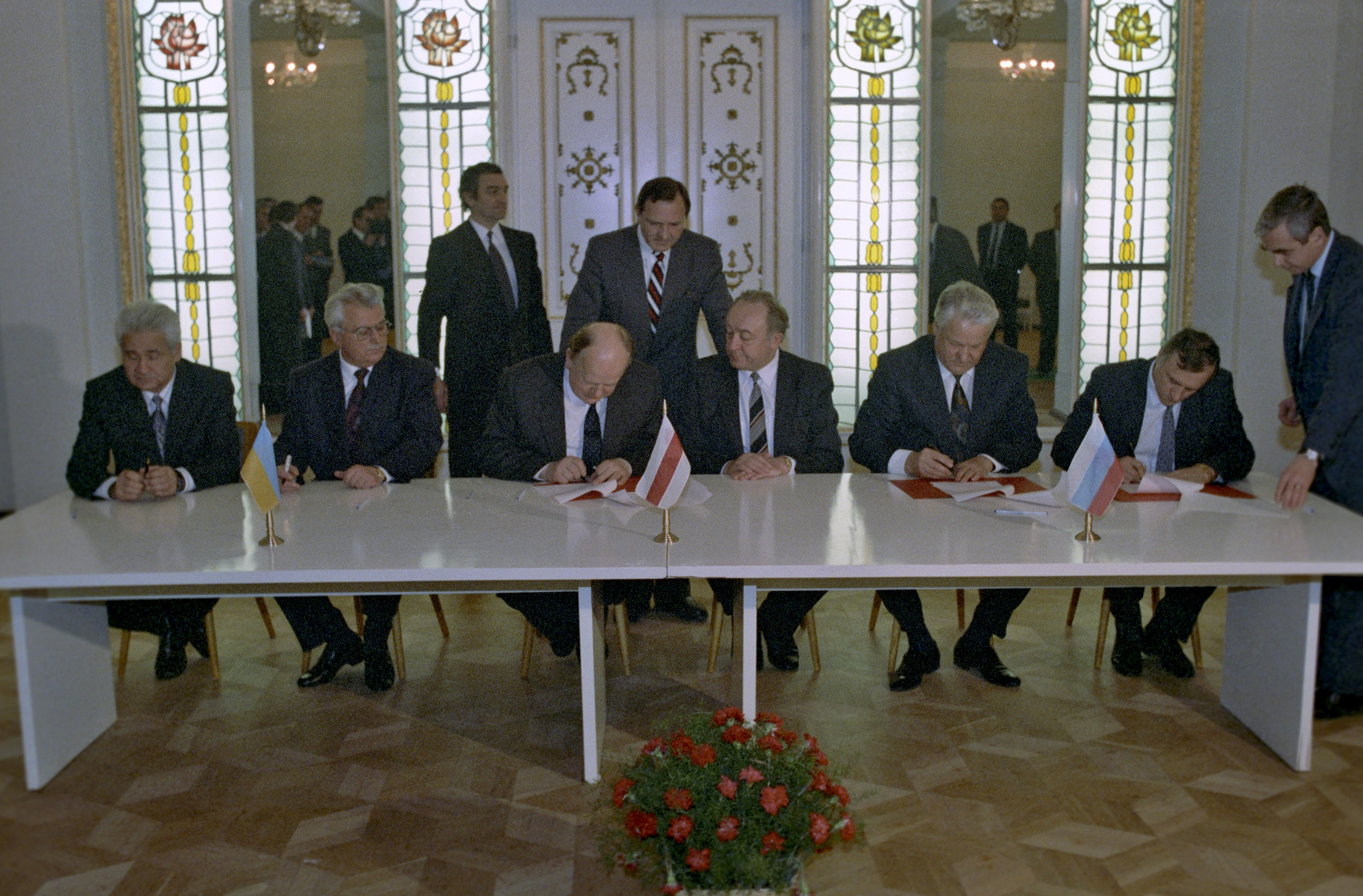
Shushkevich signing Belovezha Accords with Kravchuk and Yeltsin on 8 December 1991

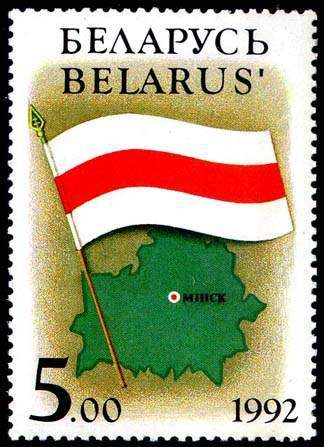
Stamp of Belarusian white-red-white flag in 1992

Due to many of the political structures of Belarus being inherited from the BSSR, minus the CPSU's party politics, Belarus between 1991 and 1994 acted as a parliamentary republic with the Speaker as head of state. This position was held by Stanislav Shushkevich at first, but was later taken up by Myechyslaw Hryb, a pro-Russian conservative aligned with the Supreme Council.

In early 1992, the Belarusian Popular Front petitioned the government for early elections, but the Supreme Council rejected the petition, claiming massive irregularities, despite showcasing no evidence for such. As a concession to the opposition, parliamentary elections were set for March 1994. However, electoral reform failed to pass led to an ambiguous state for elections. Concerns stated by other countries, including the United States over continued delays in new elections were dismissed by the largely conservative Supreme Council as "interference in Belarusian affairs."

A new constitution was adopted on 15 March 1994, which remains in force to this day, establishing the country as a semi-presidential republic and ending the validity of the amended constitution of Soviet Belarus.

On 15 April 1994, Hryb, as head of state and ex officio member of the Council of Heads of State of the Commonwealth of Independent States, on behalf of Belarus signed the Agreement on the creation of a free trade area as "the first stage of the creation of the Economic Union" (which is still as of 2024 used by Belarus for foreign trade, in particular, with Azerbaijan and Georgia), as well as the "Agreement on Ukraine's accession to the Economic Union as an associate member" (which has never entered into force).

== 1994 presidential election ==
The first presidential election took place on 23 June and 10 July. The candidates were:

- Alexander Lukashenko, a populist, former anti-corruption commission chairman whose charges led to dismissal of Shushkevich as a Chairman of the Supreme Council in January 1994
- Vyacheslav Kebich, the incumbent Prime Minister of Belarus
- Zianon Pazniak, a nationalist leader of the Belarusian Popular Front and a parliamentary deputy
- Stanislav Shushkevich, former Chairman of the Supreme Council of Belarus and de facto leader of Belarus from 1991 to 1994
- Alaksandar Dubko, a former chairman of the Grodno Regional Executive Committee
- Vasily Novikov, a communist parliamentary deputy

=== The results ===
Lukashenko achieved 45.76% and Kebich gained 17.69%. Other candidates received 13.09% (Pazniak), 10.12 (Shushkevich), 6.11 (Dubko) and 4.38 (Novikov). In the second round, Lukashenko won with 80.61% of the votes, while Kebich achieved 14.22%. This election is considered the only free election held in Belarus since it broke away from the Soviet Union.

== Lukashenko era (1994–present) ==
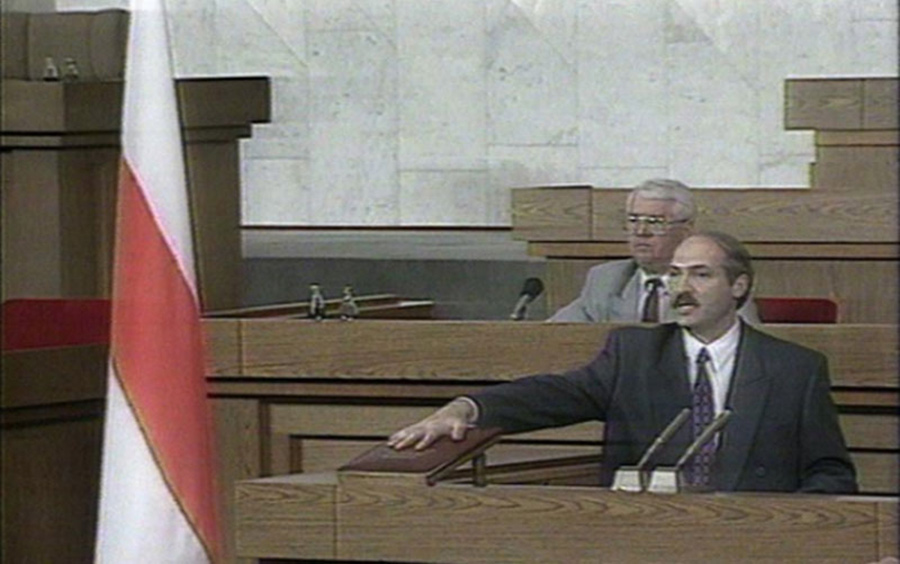
First inauguration of Alexander Lukashenko, 20 July 1994

=== First term ===
Lukashenko's presidential inauguration took place on 20 July 1994. After becoming a president, Lukashenko signed the Budapest Memorandum on 5 December 1994 along with Russia, the United Kingdom and the United States acting as guarantors and thereby denuclearized the nation.

==== Belarusian constitutional crisis ====
After his election, Lukashenko began to consolidate power. In March 1995, he proposed a referendum on strengthening his power and changing national symbols from the white-red-white flag and Pahonia to those based on Byelorussian SSR.

On 11 April 1995, Parliament considered the questions for the referendum, approved the date, but approved only the question regarding economic integration with Russia. Lukashenko declared that he would not change his decision and would accept personal responsibility for the referendum, and left the Parliament, announcing that it would be his last discussions with Parliament in its current form. Nineteen MPs from the Belarusian Popular Front, including Zianon Pazniak, Piatro Sadoŭski and others, decided to carry out a hunger strike within Parliament, protesting against the president organizing the referendum despite the parliament's decision. They were beaten and forcibly removed by OMON. The parliamentarians sued the special forces for battery but were unsuccessful.

Seats in the Supreme Council after the 1995 election were dominated by anti-Lukashenko opposition

In the 1995 parliamentary election, the Supreme Council became dominated by the opposition, and Syamyon Sharetski was elected its chairman.

In the summer, opposition initiated an impeachment against Alexander Lukashenko with 73 of 199 members of the Supreme Council supporting the procedure, citing as a reason constant violating of the constitution and ignoring the ruling of the Supreme Court. The crisis peaked in November, when Lukashenko surrounded the building with units subordinated to him, and the Supreme Court endorsed an impeachment while even Prime Minister Mikhail Chyhir revolted against President Lukashenko. Then, Russia intervened with Prime Minister Viktor Chernomyrdin and some State Duma members acting as mediators between parliamentarians and Lukashenko. They brokered a compromise that led many deputies to withdraw their signatures, effectively halting the impeachment process.

On 24 November 1996, members of parliament tried to gather together to vote against a referendum, but Lukashenko used Police to block them, effectively stripping them from real power, which turned Belarus into a full authoritarian dictatorship. In response to the growing Lukashenko's power, Belarusian opposition organized mass street protests from March 1996 to April 1997, known as the Minsk Spring or Belarusian Spring, which failed to remove Lukashenko.

==== 1999 protest election ====
In 1999, opposition tried to conduct a new presdiential election on 16 May, which was not recognized by the Electoral Commission and mostly seen as a protest action, after which opposition leaders Yury Zacharanka and Viktar Hanchar disappeared and were presumably killed. Dissidents, led by figures like Ales Bialiatski, Vincuk Viačorka, Anatoly Lebedko and Mikola Statkevich, responded with a demonstration in Minsk called Freedom March on 17 October, after which a number of forcefully-disappeared individuals significantly decreased.

Another demonstration against Lukashenko, called Second Freedom March, took place on 15 March 2000, against integration with Russia and in defence of Belarusian independence. Ten days later, over 500 people were detained by the police.

In 2001, Lukashenko was re-elected as president with 77.39% of the vote, while the main opposition candidate Uładzimir Hančaryk achieved only 16.01%, in elections described as undemocratic by Western observers, but the world was then focused on 11 September 2001 terrorist attack in the United States, so the news from Belarus were obscured by information noise.

=== Second and third terms ===
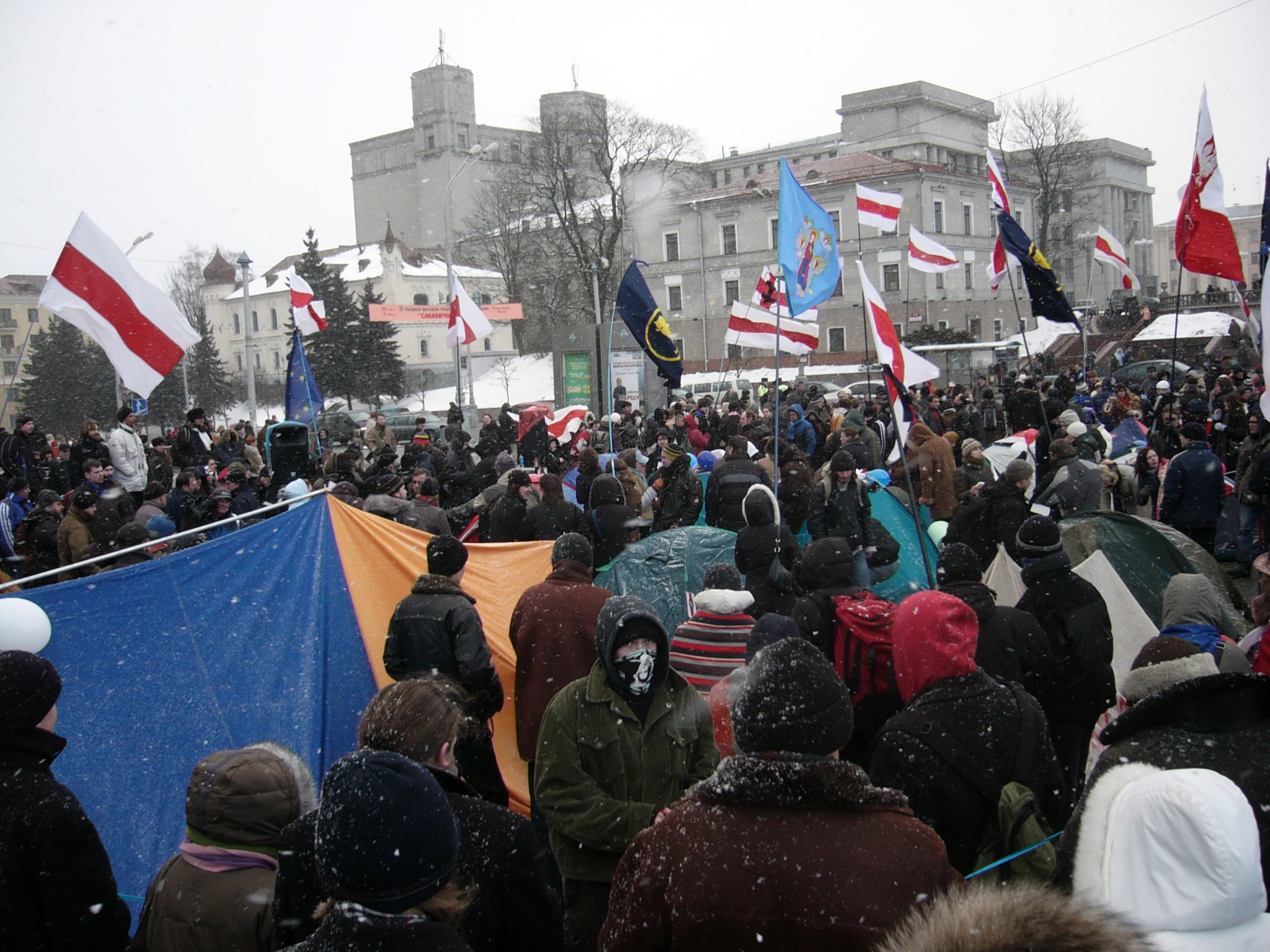
Opposition protests on October Square in Minsk during the Jeans Revolution, 21 March 2006

==== 2006 presidential election and protests ====
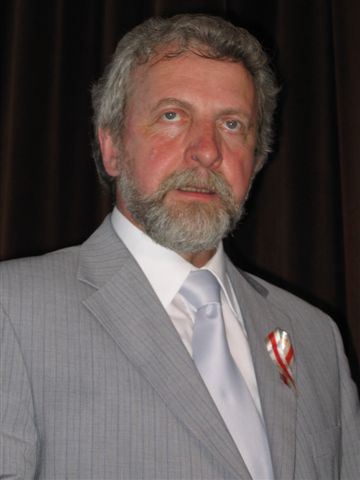
Alaksandar Milinkievič, presdidential candidate in 2006 and the leader of the Jeans Revolution

Lukashenko abolished term limits following the falsified 2004 constitutional referendum, which allowed him to run for a third time in 2006. On election which happened on 19 March 2006, the opposition coalition United Democratic Forces of Belarus supported Alaksandar Milinkievič, a former Deputy Mayor of Grodno from 1990 to 1996.

The official election results gave Lukashenko 84.44% of the vote, while Milinkievič achieved 6.22%. However, Milinkievič's campaign office asserted that he received 25.6% of the vote, compared to Lukashenko's 47%. This caused the anti-Lukashenko protests called the Jeans Revolution. Approximately 10,000 people, including members of the United Democratic Forces, Young Front, Belarusian Social Democratic Party (Assembly) and Zubr, gathered at October Square in Minsk. They waved the white-red-white flag of independent Belarus, the flag of Europe, and flags of other nations such as Ukraine, Poland, and Russia. Several hundred protesters remained at the square overnight, with thousands present each evening. These protests were suppressed by 25 March.

==== Detoriation of relations with Russia ====
The Russia–Belarus energy dispute began when Russian state-owned gas supplier Gazprom demanded an increase in gas prices paid by Belarus, a country which has been closely allied with Moscow and forms a loose union state with Russia. It escalated on 8 January 2007, when the Russian state-owned pipeline company Transneft stopped pumping oil into the Druzhba pipeline which runs through Belarus because Belarus was siphoning the oil off the pipe without mutual agreement. On 10 January, Transneft resumed oil exports through the pipeline after Belarus ended the tariff that sparked the shutdown, despite differing messages from the parties on the state of negotiations.

In June 2009, a diplomatic conflict known as the "Milk War" happened. Russia, under then-President Dmitry Medvedev, allegedly attempted to loan Belarus. US$ 500 million to recognize the independence of Abkhazia and South Ossetia. Russia also expressed its interest in privatizing the Belarusian milk industry. Belarus responded by seeking negotiations with the European Union on certifying Belarusian milk according to EU regulations. Russia then banned the import of dairy products from Belarus, citing alleged health concerns. The trade conflict ended on June 17, 2009, when Russia announced that it would lift the ban.

Later in 2009, Belarusian president Alexander Lukashenko expressed regret for not supporting Russia in recognizing Abkhazia and South Ossetia. The Belarusian House of Representatives sent a fact-finding mission to the disputed regions to study whether or not Belarus should provide diplomatic recognition. Georgia protested the mission and urged Belarus to maintain non-recognition.

=== Fourth and fifth terms ===
==== 2010 presidential election and protests ====
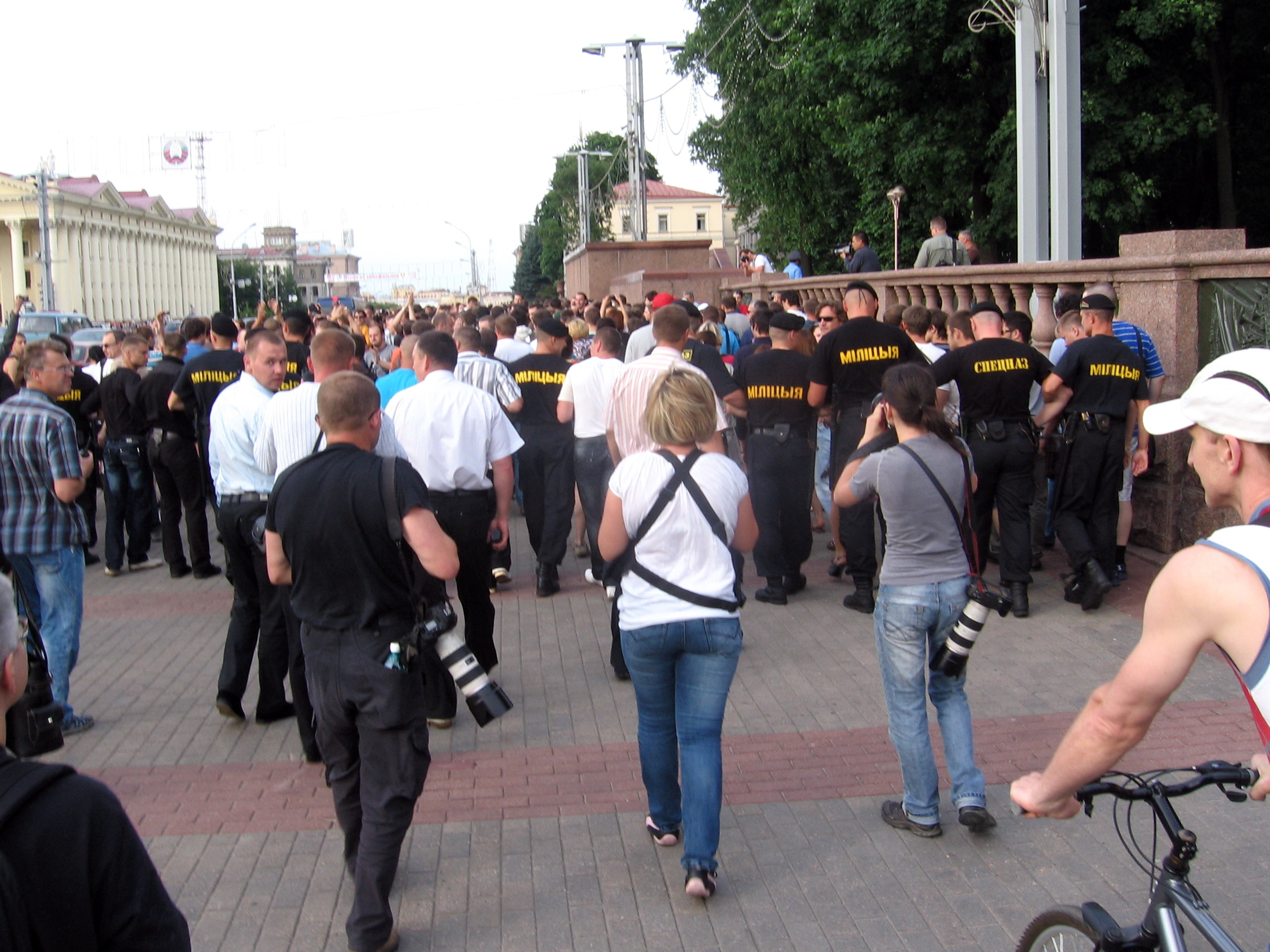
Security forces pushing back protesters in Minsk, 15 June 2011

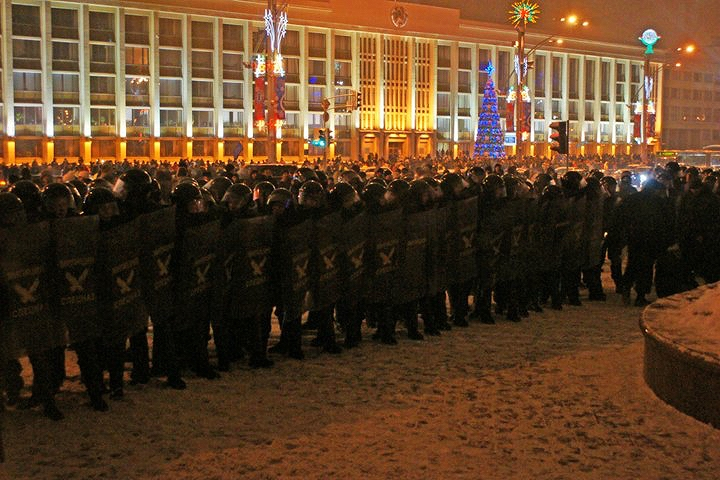
Protest against the falsified presidential election in 2010. Brutal special police forces surrounding protestors in Minsk.

The 2010 Belarusian presidential election was marked by another election fraud, with Lukashenko allegedly achieving 80% of the vote, while opposition candidate Andrei Sannikov officially get only 2.45%. Opposition protests erupted again on 10–21 December, and were suppressed by Militsiya and KGB.

From June to October 2011, "silent protests" took place. Protesters stayed in public places but chanted no words. Much of the protesting fervor stemmed from a rapidly degrading economy that Belarus had been facing in the months before the protests.

Effective 31 January 2011, the EU renewed a travel ban, prohibiting Lukashenko and 156 of his associates from traveling to EU member countries, as a result of the crackdown on opposition supporters.

==== Teddybear Airdrop Minsk 2012 ====
On 4 July 2012, an airplane, chartered by the Swedish advertising agency Studio Total, illegally entered the Belarusian airspace on 4 July and parachuted several hundred teddy bears with notes carrying pro-democracy messages. After denying for three weeks that the incident ever took place and calling the footage of the airdrop released by Studio Total a hoax, the Belarus government finally acknowledged on 26 July 2012, that the teddy bear airdrop did happen.

The event greatly angered the President of Belarus Alexander Lukashenko, who viewed it as a significant national security failure. Lukashenko sacked two top generals, the heads of Belarus' border guards and of Air Defense, for failing to intercept the Studio Total plane. The airdrop led to an escalating diplomatic crisis in relations between Belarus and Sweden. On 3 August 2012, Belarus expelled the Swedish Ambassador Stefan Eriksson and subsequently ordered the remaining staff of the Swedish embassy to leave Belarus by the end of the month. Belarus also withdrew its ambassador and all of its embassy staff from Sweden.

Lukashenko was supportive of China's Belt and Road Initiative global infrastructure development strategy, and the inception in 2012 of the associated low-tax China–Belarus Industrial Park near Minsk National Airport, planned to grow to 112 square kilometres (43 sq mi) by the 2060s.

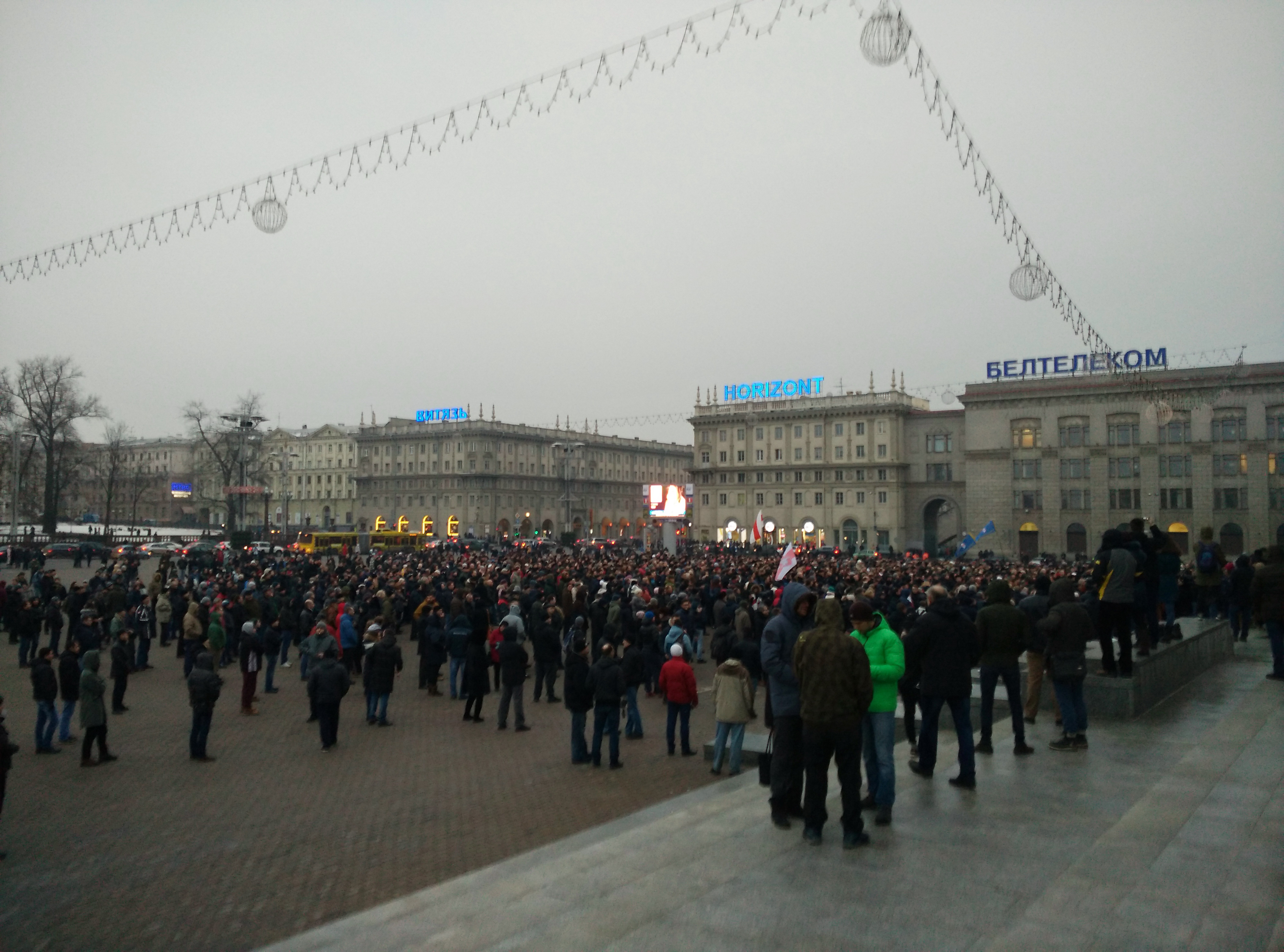
2017 Belarusian protests against Lukashenko

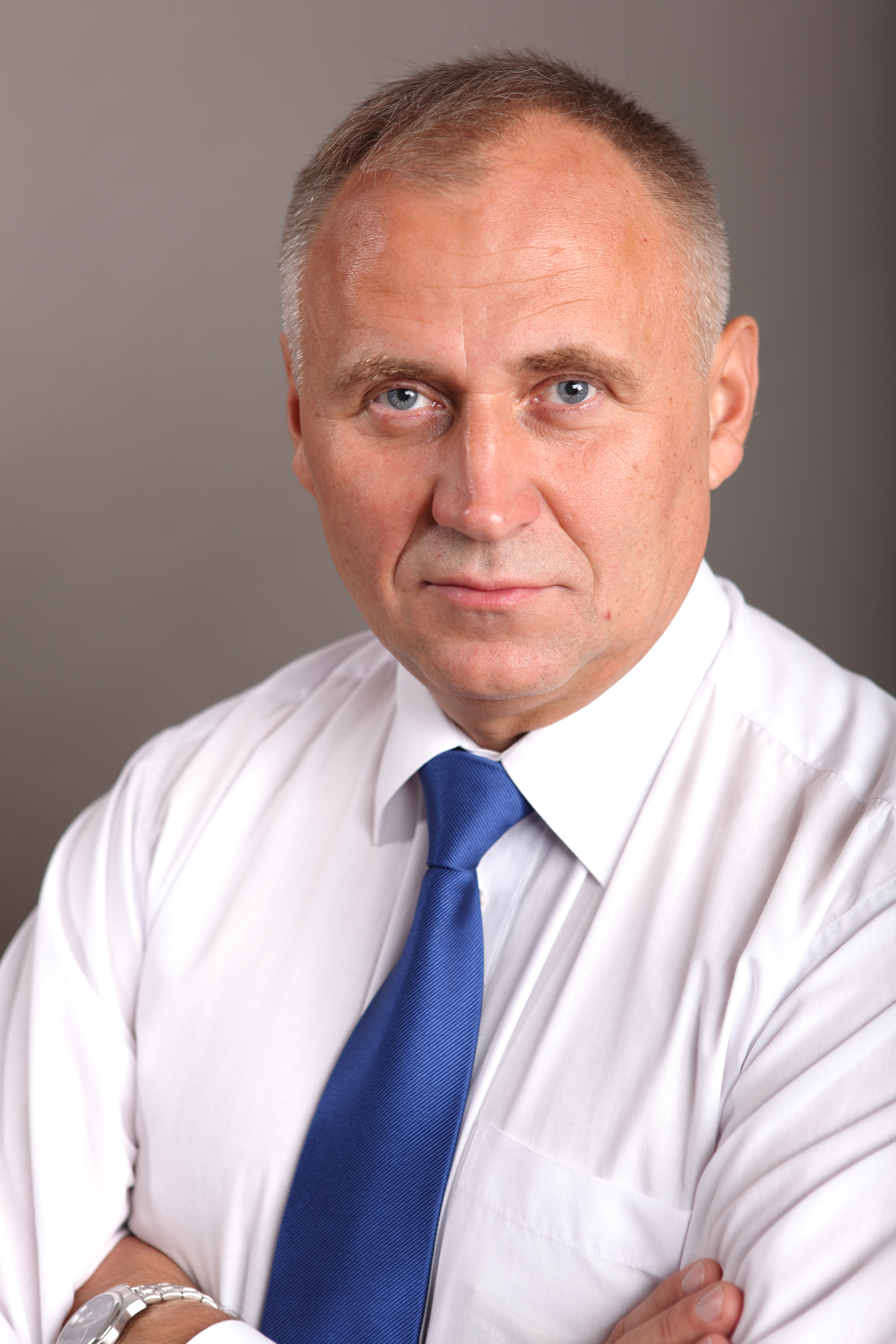
Mikola Statkevich

On 11 October 2015, Lukashenko again falsified a presidential election to secure his fifth term as the president of Belarus. Just over three weeks later, he was inaugurated in the Independence Palace in the presence of attendees such as former president of Ukraine Leonid Kuchma, Chairman of the Russian Communist Party Gennady Zyuganov, and Belarusian biathlete Darya Domracheva. In mid-September 2017, Lukashenko oversaw the advancement of joint Russian and Belarusian military relations during the military drills that were part of the Zapad 2017 exercise.

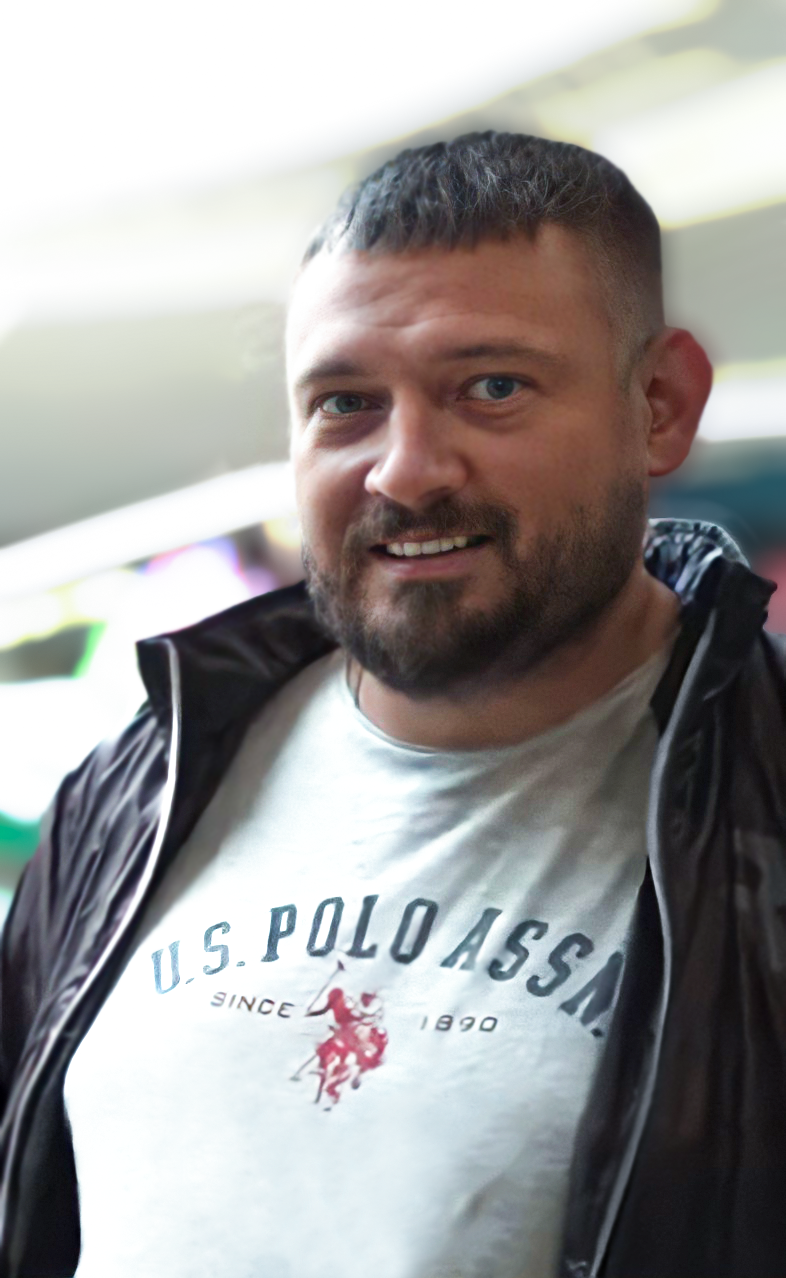
Sergei Tikhanovsky

In February 2017, protests against Lukashenko errupted again, this time against the taxation of the unemployed and economic and social policies of the government. Demonstrations and marches were held in sites throughout the country with sizes of several hundred to several thousand gathering at a given time. On May Day, 400 people came to a banned protest despite the jailing of Mikola Statkevich, opposition leader and main organizer of the event.

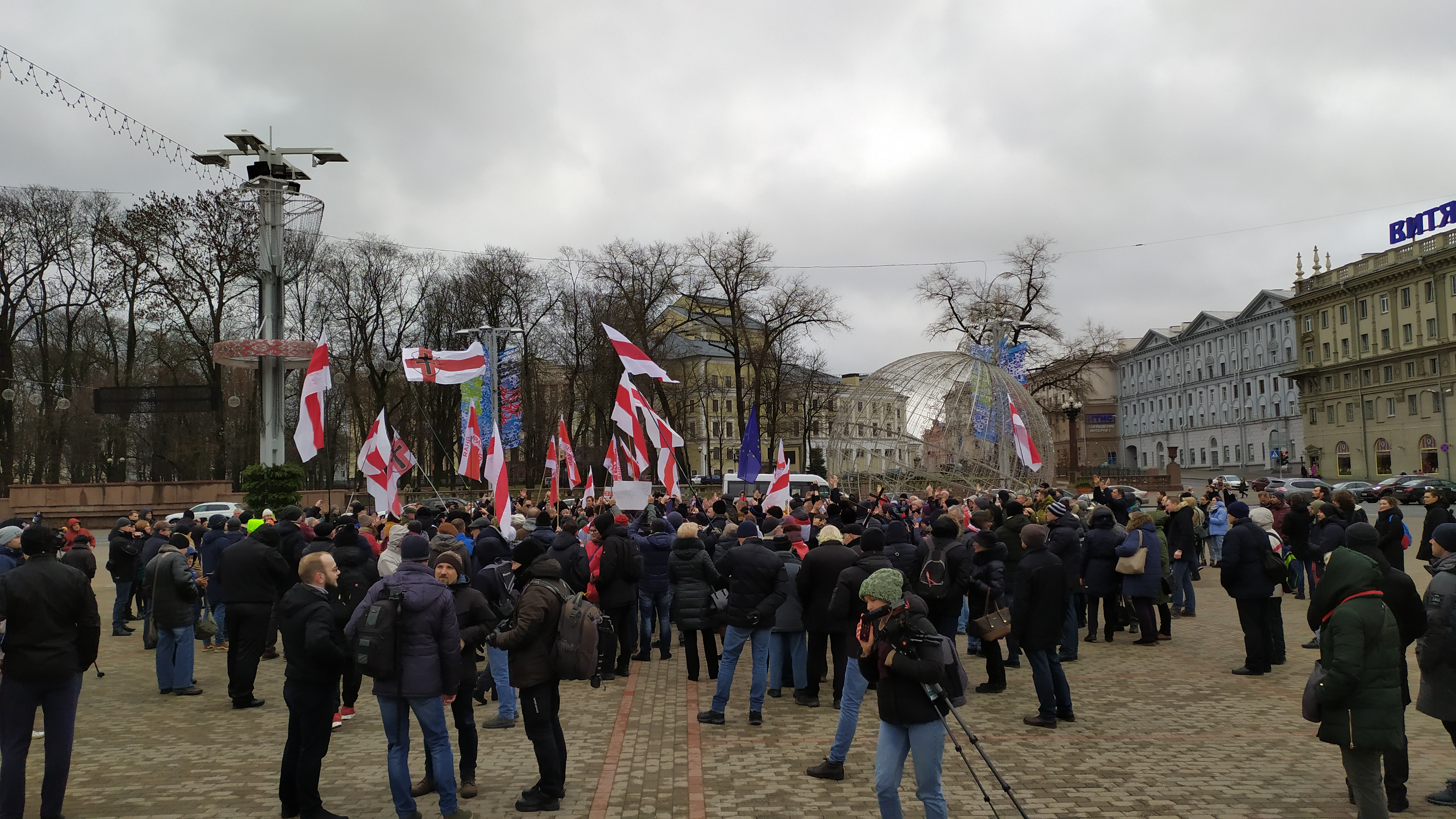
Anti-Lukashenko demonstration in Minsk organized by the Young Front and pro-EU supporters

In December 2019, a wave of protests directed against Belarus' further integration with Russia began. They were led by Belarusian youth activist Paval Sieviaryniec and a rising YouTuber and opposition figure Sergei Tikhanovsky. Demonstrations were visible on the October Square in Minsk and in Polotsk, with protesters waving the white-red-white flags and symbols of the European Union.

=== Sixth term ===
==== Threat to Lukashenko's power ====
On 9 May 2020, dozens of supporters of Sergei Tikhanovsky held an "Anti-parade" in Babruysk to express their disagreement with the Victory Day Parade in Minsk during the COVID-19 pandemic. The protest parade took the form of a protest motor rally. Police detained about 15 people after the motor rally. The opposition leader Tikhanovsky was also detained.

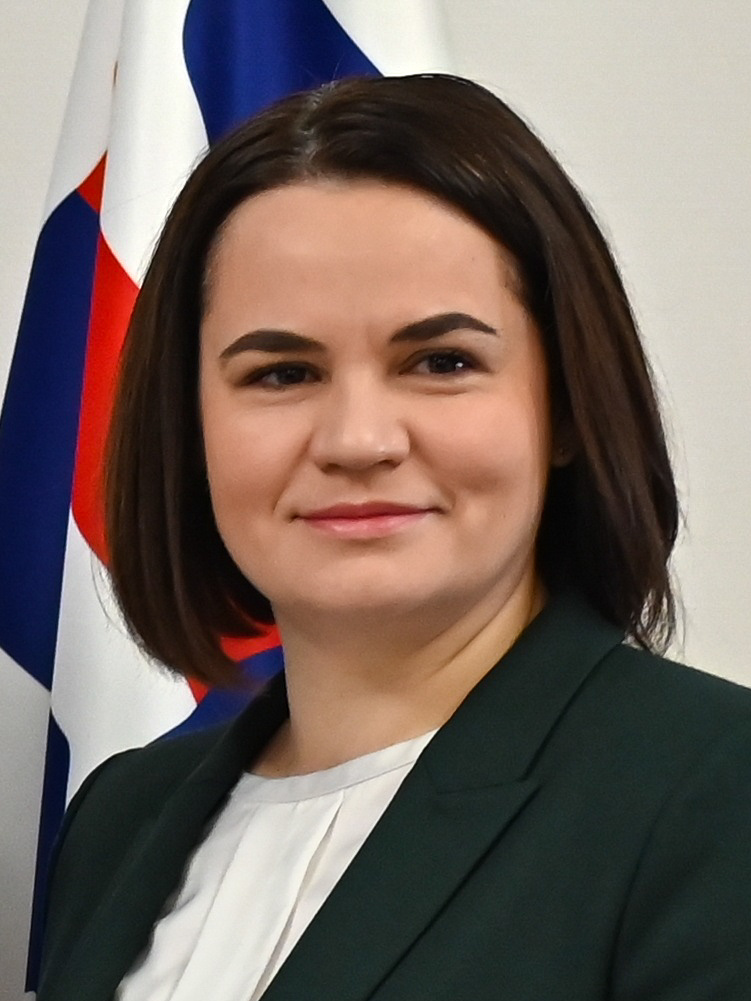
Belarusian opposition leader Sviatlana Tsikhanouskaya

2020 election and protests

On 7 May 2020, Sergei Tikhanovsky announced on his YouTube channel that he intended to become a candidate for President of Belarus, challenging Alexander Lukashenko and his decades long rule. Prior to this event, on 6 May, he was detained by the Belarusian militsiya (police) in the vicinity of Mogilev; the police threatened to break the glass of Tikhanovsky's car, and failed to present a certificate to confirm that they were police officers. Prior to that, a crowd of Tikhanovsky's supporters in Mogilev released a member of Tikhanovsky's team from the police. A day later, allies of Tikhanovsky were arrested, including a blogger from Slutsk, Uladzimier Niaronski. The vans of Tikhanovsky's team including Niaronski were chased by road police and two vans with members of the AMAP special police forces.

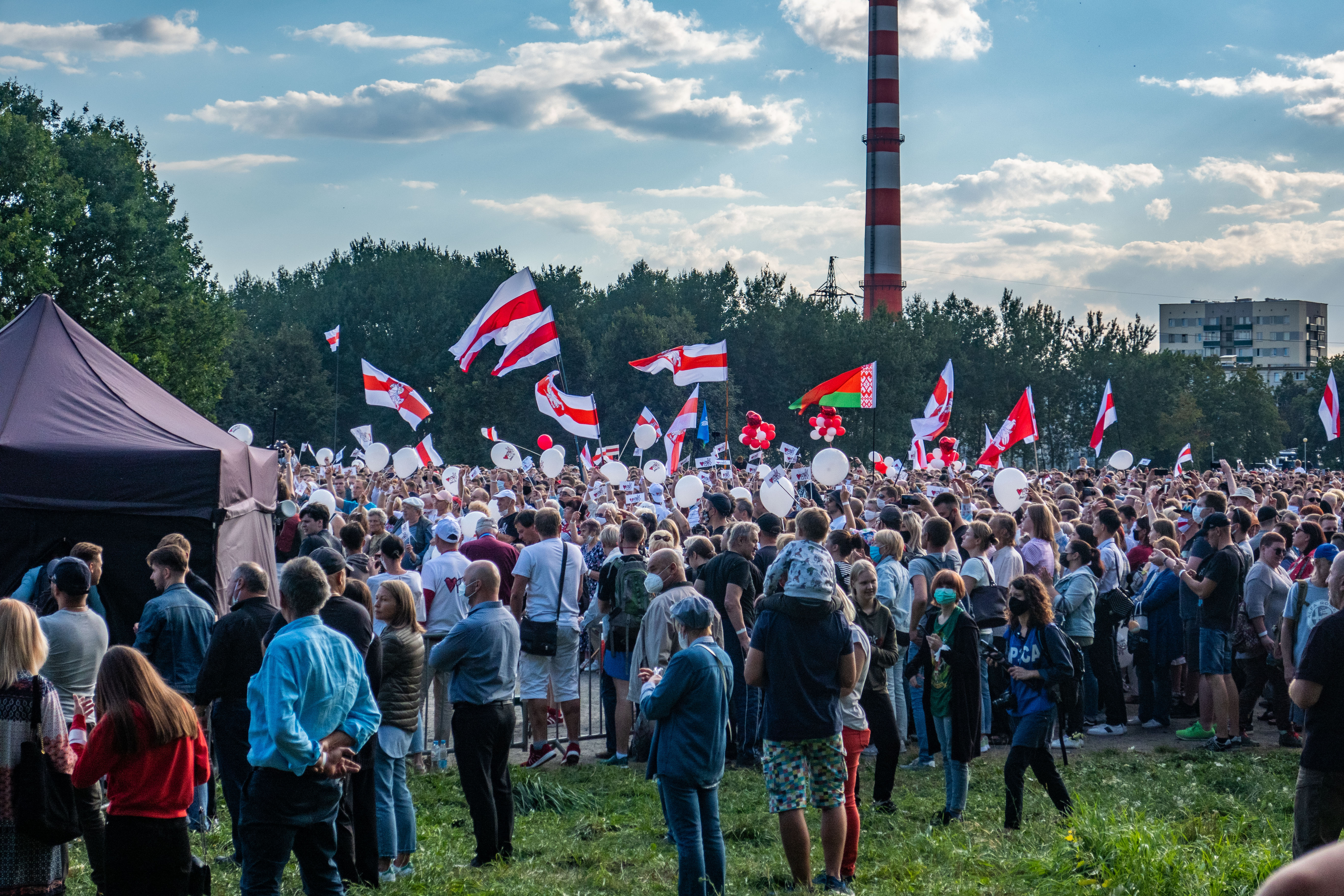
Pro-Tsikhanouskaya rally in Minsk, 30 July 2020

After the arrests, Tikhanovsky's supporters held a series of protests throughout Belarus. According to the Radio Liberty, 20 to 30 people were detained in Gomel, the home town of Tikhanovsky. Viasna Human Rights Centre reports that at least 19 people who supported Tikhanovsky were brutally detained in Minsk.

After his arrest, Tikhanovsky was held at a temporary detention center in Gomel, nominally due to participation in the rally in Minsk on 19 December 2019 against the integration of Belarus with Russia. He was ultimately sentenced to 15 days' imprisonment: 15 days of arrest for "participating in an unauthorized protest action" in December 2019, and 30 days for meeting subscribers to his YouTube channel in Orsha and Brest. After his detention, Tikhanovsky announced on his YouTube channel that he intended to run for president of Belarus. However, the Central Election Commission of Belarus refused to register the initiative group to nominate him.

After the election commission refused to register Tikhanovsky's candidacy, his wife Sviatlana Tsikhanouskaya (Svetlana Tikhanovskaya), decided to run herself. The initiative group of Sviatlana Tsikhanouskaya was successfully registered by the Central Election Commission of Belarus. Sergei Tikhanovsky became the head of the initiative group to collect signatures for Sviatlana Tsikhanouskaya's participation in the presidential election.

On 20 May, Tikhanovsky was released from detention.

On 29 May 2020, Tikhanovsky and other persons were arrested in the city of Grodno, in northwestern Belarus, while collecting signatures for Sviatlana Tsikhanouskaya's presidential candidacy, and charged with "organization or preparation for a grave breach of public order."

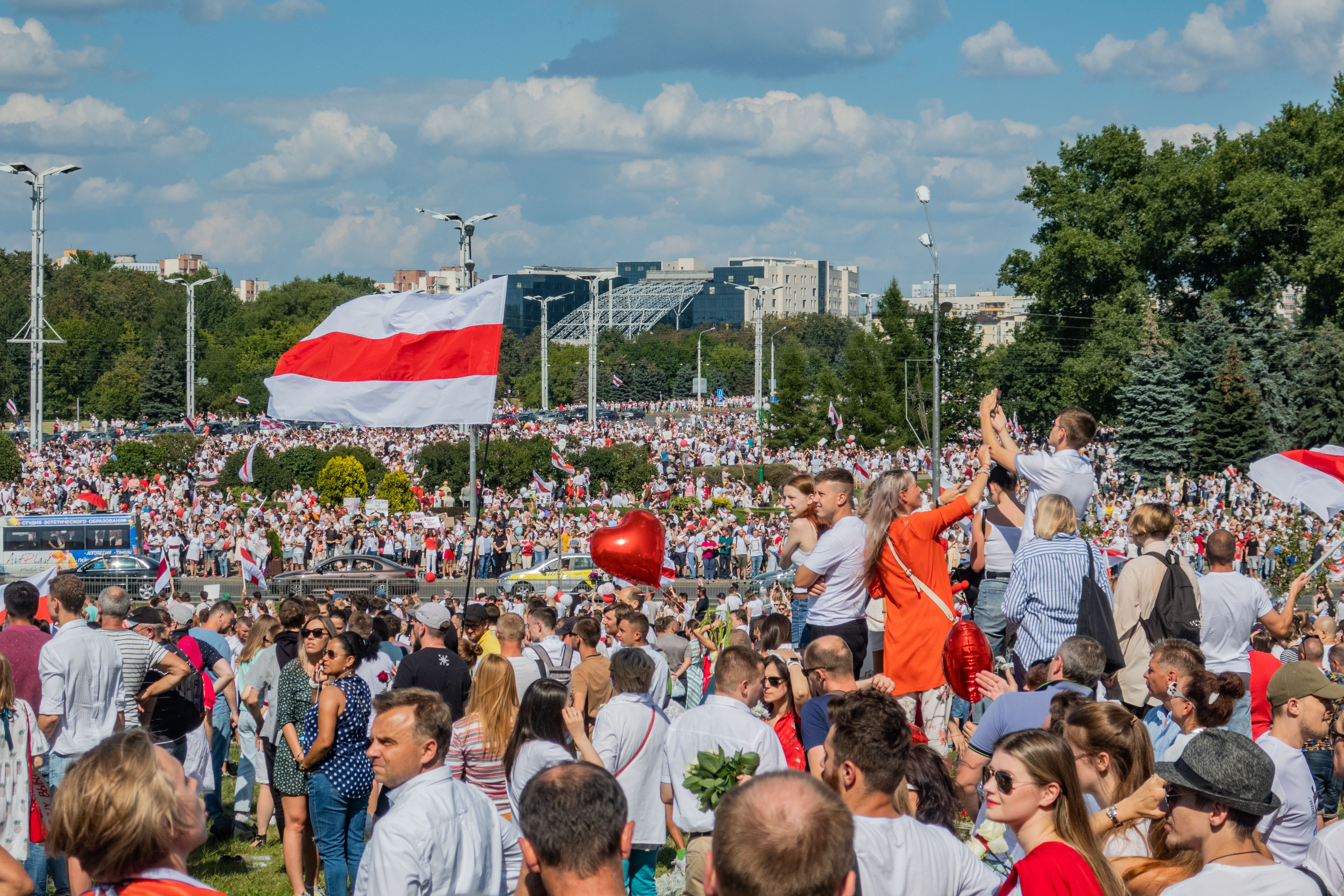
Protest rally against Lukashenko, Minsk, 16 August 2020

On 9 August, the election happened but was considered falsified, with Alexander Lukashenko allegedly winning 81.04% of the vote.

Opposition candidate Sviatlana Tsikhanouskaya claimed to have won a decisive first-round victory with at least 60% of the vote, and called on Lukashenko to start negotiations. Her campaign subsequently formed the Coordination Council to facilitate a transfer of power and stated that it was ready to organize "long-term protests" against the official results. All seven members of the Coordination Council Presidium were subsequently arrested or went into exile.

All opposition candidates filed appeals to the Central Election Commission calling for the results to be invalidated. The election was marred by claims of widespread electoral fraud. Numerous countries refused to accept the result of the election, as did the European Union, which imposed sanctions on Belarusian officials deemed to be responsible for "violence, repression and election fraud". The results of the election led to the most widespread protests since Lukashenko's rise to power, often considered as a revolution by many media, which lasted from May 2020 to March 2021 and were led by the Coordination Council created by Tsikhanouskaya and including figures like Sviatlana Alexievich, Sergei Dylevsky, Maria Kalesnikava, Pavel Latushko, Olga Kovalkova, Liliya Vlasova, and Maxim Znak, and resulted in protesters facing violent persecution by the authorities. A statement by the United Nations Human Rights Office on 1 September cited more than 450 documented cases of torture and ill-treatment of detainees, as well as reports of sexual abuse and rape. At the end of 2020, the Viasna Human Rights Centre documented 1,000 testimonies of torture victims. Tsikhanouskaya, while in exile, created a United Transitional Cabinet of Belarus, a claimed government-in-exile for a takeover after Lukashenko, when operating from Vilnius, Lithuania.

== Foreign relations ==
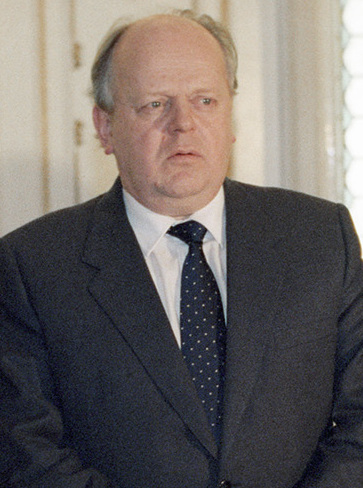
Chairman of the Supreme Council of Belarus Stanislav Shushkevich (left)

met with U.S. President Bill Clinton (right) on 15 January 1994 in Minsk.

During the early 1990s, Belarus had a very contradictory foreign policy, due to the various conflicts between the branches of government. The Foreign Minister at the time, Piatro Kravchanka, advanced claims on neighboring Lithuania with a nationalist outlook, while Stanislav Shushkevich rejected such claims, and attempted to guarantee the current borders of the country. The Polish-Belarusian state declaration, signed in October 1991, ended Belarusian claims on Polish territory, and calmed fears amongst the small nationalist movement of Polish irredentism. The country also experienced friendly relations with the West, which culminated with American President Bill Clinton's first and only visit to Minsk on 15 January 1994.

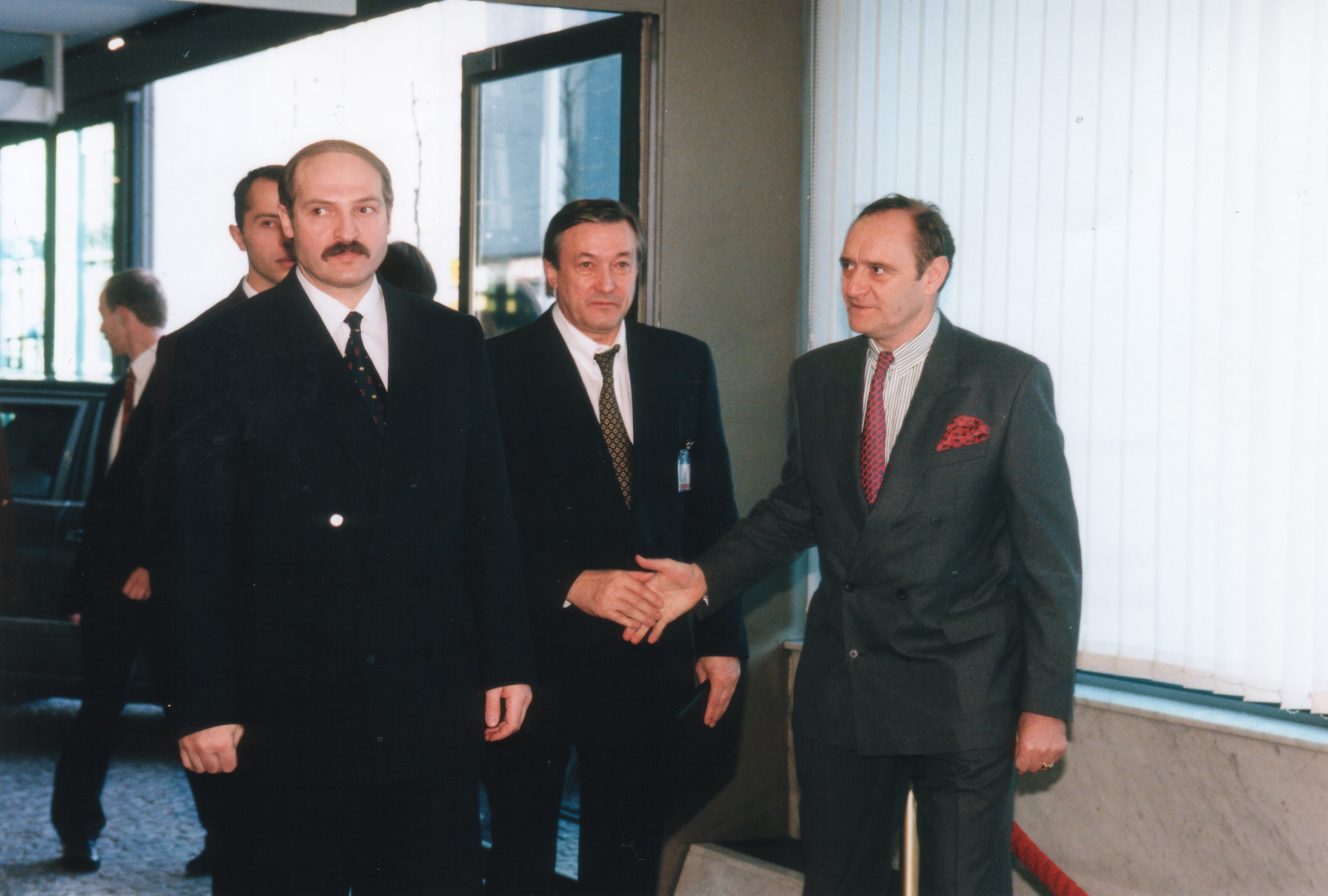
Lukashenko visiting European Commission in Brussels in 1995

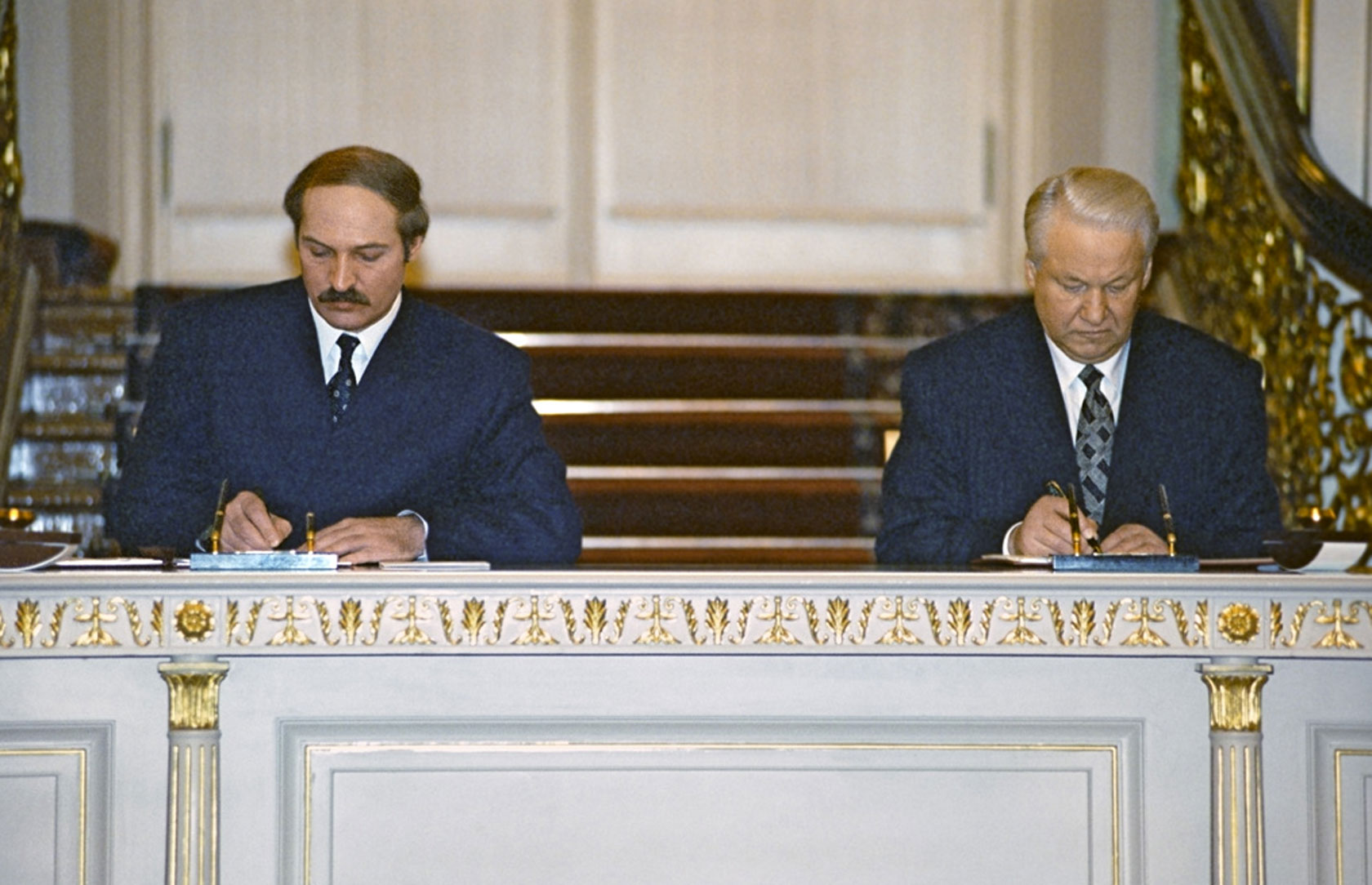
Alexander Lukashenko with Boris Yeltsin (1997)

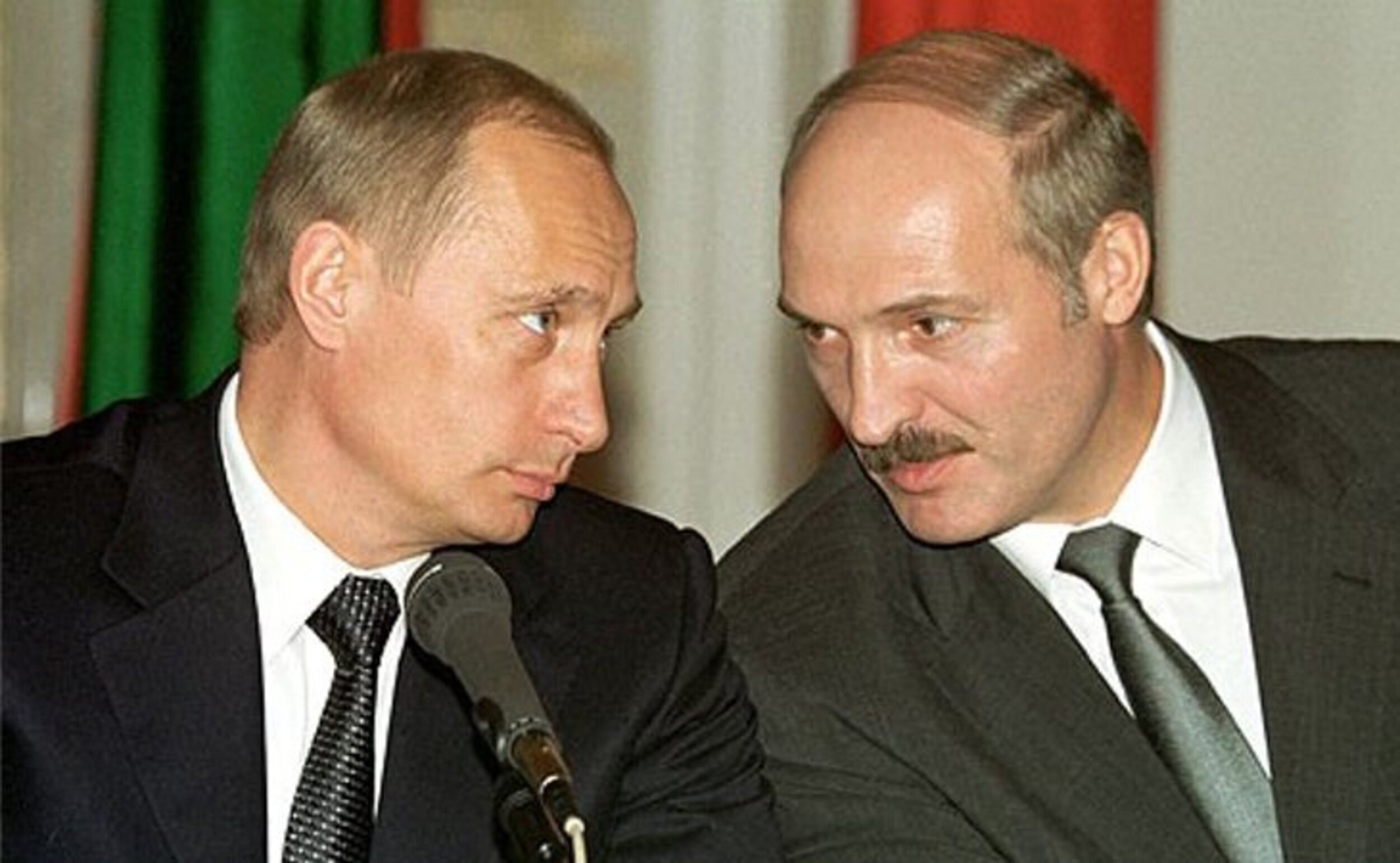
Lukashenko with Vladimir Putin (2002)

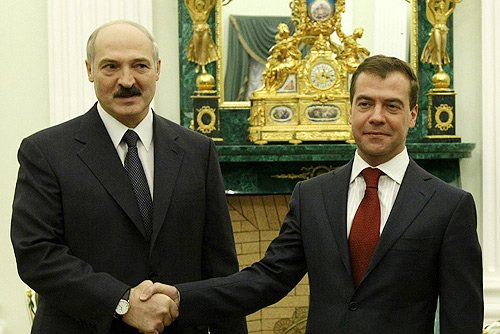
Lukashenko with Dmitry Medvedev (2008)

International politics changed after Lukashenko's rise to power when, after his brief visit to Brussels on 6 March 1995, relations with the European Union and the general West began to deteriorate, while relations with Russia (albeit his first months in power Lukashenko didn't embrace a clearly pro-Russian foreign policy), China and other authoritarian-leaning or anti-western countries (Azerbaijan, Venezuela under Hugo Chávez and Nicolás Maduro, Federal Republic of Yugoslavia under Slobodan Milošević, Libya under Muammar Gaddafi, or Syria under Ba'athist regime of Hafez and Bashar al-Assad) improved, with Belarus defending those countries' leaders in cases of revolutions (2000 Serbian Bulldozer Revolution, 2011 Libyan revolution and civil war, 2024 fall of the Assad regime after a civil war) and Lukashenko being supported by them during protests against his own rule (2006, 2010, 2017, 2020-2021).

== Leaders of Belarus since 1991 ==
Leaders of the Republic of Belarus since 1991
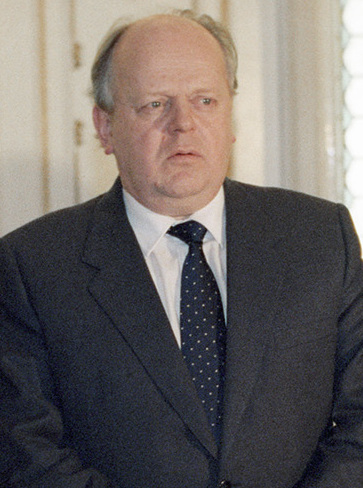
Stanislav Shushkevich (1991–1994)

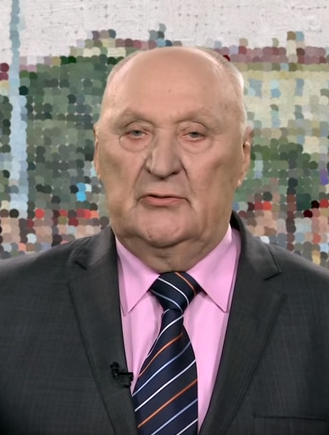
Myechyslaw Hryb (1994)

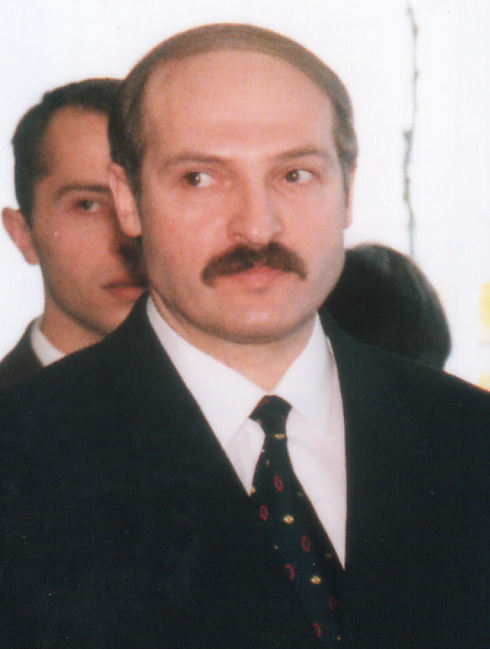
Alexander Lukashenko (since 1994 (Note: Some countries, especially Western nations, do not recognise Lukashenko as the legitimate president of Belarus since the 2020 Belarusian presidential election. However, he continues to have de facto control over Belarus, being supported by Russia and China and by suppressing internal opposition.))

== Human rights ==
Belarus was classified as "Partly Free" by Freedom House in their reports from 1992–1995, with criticisms including the continued state ownership of media outlets and political conflicts obstructing reform, while changing to "Not Free" in 1996 and staying like that since that year.
