= International reactions to the 2020 Belarusian presidential election and 2020–2021 protests =

2020 geopolitical event

The following is a list of the official reactions to the 2020 Belarusian presidential election and the surrounding 2020–2021 Belarusian protests.

International reactions to Lukashenko's re-election: Belarus Congratulated Lukashenko Recognised Tsikhanouskaya as winner Did not recognise results Expressed criticism over conflict escalation No reaction

== International organisations ==
=== Not recognising election result ===
- High Representative of the European Union Josep Borrell and European Commissioner for Neighbourhood and Enlargement Olivér Várhelyi issued a joint statement. The joint statement condemned the police violence following the election and stating that the EU would monitor further developments. The EU later stated that it would re-evaluate its relationship with Belarus. EU foreign ministers at an emergency video meeting on 14 August agreed to bring in new sanctions against Belarusian officials responsible for "violence and falsification". Members of the European Parliament issued a joint statement on 17 August, stating that they did not recognise Alexander Lukashenko as the president of Belarus and considered him a persona non grata in the European Union. The European Parliament also expressed its support for sanctions imposed against Lukashenko and members of his government. On 19 August, following a meeting of heads of government, the European Council issued a statement declaring that "The 9 August elections were neither free nor fair, therefore we do not recognise the results". In an interview on 22 August, Borrell explicitly stated that the European Union does not recognise Lukashenko as the legitimate president of Belarus, in the same manner that it does not recognise Nicolás Maduro as the legitimate president of Venezuela. Borrell reiterated this position at a meeting of the European Parliament on 15 September 2020. On 17 September 2020, the European Parliament recognised the coordination council as the "interim representation of the people" of Belarus.

=== Expressing concerns ===
- United Nations Spokesman Stéphane Dujarric said the UN was following post-election developments with great concern, calling on the Belarusian authorities to show maximum restraint and to ensure full respect for the rights of freedom of expression, peaceful assembly and association. UN High Commissioner for Human Rights Michelle Bachelet also condemned the violent response. She stated that the reports of ill-treatment during and after detention were "disturbing", reminded the Belarusian Government "of the absolute prohibition on torture and other ill-treatment of detainees", and saw the detaining of bystanders and minors as "suggesting a trend of massive arrests in clear violation of international human rights standards". On 17 March 2023, the UN High Commissioner for Human Rights issued a report according to which there were "sufficient grounds to believe that systematic, widespread and gross human rights violations have been and are being committed in Belarus", and "some of the violations may also amount to crimes against humanity". The report cited violations including excessive use of force, torture and arbitrary arrests as part of a "campaign of violence and repression" against protesters opposing the government.
- (Vatican City) Pope Francis in his address on 16 August appealed for dialogue, and for people to refuse violence and to respect justice and rights.
- The OSCE Chairmanship on 17 August reiterated its concerns about the conduct of the Presidential election on 9 August, which could not be observed by the OSCE's ODIHR, the disproportionate use of force against peaceful protesters, widespread detentions, torture and mistreatment by the security forces, and asked for a visit to Belarus for the OSCE Chairperson-in-Office Edi Rama and the incoming OSCE Chairperson-in-Office Ann Linde to meet with the government and representatives of the opposition.
- (European Union) Pan-European political parties European People's Party, Progressive Alliance of Socialists and Democrats, Renew Europe, Greens–European Free Alliance and European Conservatives and Reformists Party in a joint statement condemned government-instigated violence and repressions of political protest, and called for political reform and new elections.
- Heinz Bierbaum, the President of Party of the European Left party expressed solidarity "with the protests against the autocratic system where democratic elections are a farce since years".
- The European Broadcasting Union condemned police attacks against local and foreign journalists, demanding that freedom of expression in Belarus be respected as a fundamental human right as provided in numerous international instruments, including Article 19 of the Universal Declaration of Human Rights (UDHR), Article 19 of the International Covenant on Civil and Political Rights (ICCPR), and Article 10 of the European Convention on Human Rights (ECHR).

=== Joint multi-national statements ===
- The foreign ministers of the Nordic-Baltic Eight (Denmark, Estonia, Finland, Iceland, Latvia, Lithuania, Norway, and Sweden) in a joint statement condemned the violence urging for it to end immediately, and stated that they believe the elections were neither free nor fair.
- On 15 August 2020, the prime ministers of the Baltic states (Estonia, Latvia, and Lithuania) called on Belarus to conduct new, "free and fair" elections supervised by international monitors.
- (European Union) The foreign ministers of four EU member states; Estonia, Finland, Latvia, and Poland jointly called for an EU video conference to discuss a united position for the bloc on Belarus.
- (Czech Republic) (Hungary) (Poland) (Slovakia) The Visegrád Four Central European states agreed on 18 August that Europe needed to take a unified and hard line against the Lukashenko regime.
- The Ministries of Foreign Affairs of the Lublin Triangle (Lithuania, Poland and Ukraine) issued a joint statement expressing deep concern with the escalation of the situation and called upon the authorities to refrain from the use of force and to release all those detained, as well stating their availability for any assistance or good offices in facilitating mediation.

== Countries ==
=== Positive reaction to the election ===
==== Countries that criticised the protests ====
- On 14 August 2020, Russian spokeswoman for the Ministry of Foreign Affairs Maria Zakharova stated that the protests were a result of "outside meddling" from foreign states to "create a rift in society and destabilize the situation". On 15 August, Lukashenko spoke with Putin on the phone. Lukashenko later claimed that "at the first request, Russia will provide comprehensive assistance to ensure the security of Belarus in the event of external military threats".

==== Countries that congratulated Lukashenko ====
- Prime Minister of Armenia Nikol Pashinyan and President of Armenia Armen Sarkissian congratulated Lukashenko on his victory in the presidential election.
- President of Azerbaijan Ilham Aliyev congratulated Lukashenko on his re-election during a phone call.
- Burundi at the United Nations Human Rights Council called the recent election "transparent and fair".
- (China) General Secretary and President Xi Jinping congratulated Lukashenko on his victory in the presidential election.
- (Cuba) Cuban President Miguel Díaz-Canel reiterated the island's solidarity with the "legitimate president of that country, Alexander Lukashenko, and the brother Belarusian people."
- Eritrea was the only country besides Venezuela to vote in favor of the Lukashenko government at the UNHRC.
- (Kazakhstan) Kazakh President Kassym-Jomart Tokayev sent a telegram to Lukashenko. The telegram reads: "The result of the election, which was held in a complicated political situation, proves the people's support of your strategic course aimed at strengthening of the sovereignty and independence of Belarus."
- President of Kyrgyzstan Sooronbay Jeenbekov congratulated Lukashenko on his victory in the presidential election.
- President of Moldova at the time of the election, Igor Dodon, congratulated Lukashenko on his victory in the presidential election. Dodon was later defeated in the 2020 Moldovan presidential elections by Maia Sandu, who condemned the events in Belarus and aligned herself with the European Union.
- Myanmar at the United Nations Human Rights Council welcomed the election of Lukashenko, condemned other countries for alleged interference, and asked "the international community to support the government of Belarus".
- President of Nicaragua Daniel Ortega and vice president Rosario Murillo congratulated Lukashenko on his victory in the presidential election.
- (North Korea) North Korean leader Kim Jong Un sent a message of greetings to Lukashenko on the occasion of the national day of Belarus.
- Sultan of Oman Haitham bin Tariq sent a telegram congratulating Lukashenko on his re-election as president.
- President of the Russian Federation Vladimir Putin sent a telegram to Lukashenko congratulating him on his re-election. Putin has since stated to Lukashenko that Russia would follow a collective military pact with Belarus if needed, while not expressly endorsing the Belarusian president.
- President of Syria Bashar al-Assad congratulated Lukashenko on his victory in the presidential election.
- President of Tajikistan Emomali Rahmon congratulated Lukashenko on his victory in the presidential election.
- President of Turkey Recep Tayyip Erdoğan congratulated Lukashenko on his victory in the presidential election.
- President of Uzbekistan Shavkat Mirziyoyev congratulated Lukashenko on his victory in the presidential election.
- The disputed President of Venezuela Nicolás Maduro congratulated Lukashenko on his victory in the presidential election.
- (Vietnam) General Secretary and President Nguyễn Phú Trọng congratulated Lukashenko on his victory in the presidential election.

==== Countries with limited recognition that congratulated Lukashenko ====
- President of South Ossetia Anatoliy Bibilov congratulated Lukashenko.

==== Countries maintaining military cooperation ====
The following countries participated in military cooperation with the Belarusian government following the election:

- Algeria
- Egypt
- Iran
- Mongolia
- Pakistan
- Turkmenistan

==== Disregarded congratulations ====
- (Republika Srpska) The Serb member of the Presidency of Bosnia and Herzegovina, Milorad Dodik, congratulated Lukashenko on his victory in the presidential election. This was later disregarded due to the decision to formally not recognise the result by the Bosnian Presidency (Bosniak Šefik Džaferović and Croat Željko Komšić) and the Minister of Foreign Affairs Bisera Turković.

=== Negative reaction to the election ===
==== Countries recognising Tsikhanouskaya as the winner ====
- Lithuanian President Gitanas Nausėda spoke with Tsikhanouskaya by telephone to offer his support for the coordination council she formed to facilitate the transfer of Power in Belarus. On 12 August, Lithuania opened its borders for people fleeing Belarus. The Lithuanian foreign affairs committee voted on 12 August to declare Mr Lukashenko's claim to the presidency as illegitimate. The resolution also called on NATO and EU member states to do the same. It was approved with 120 members votes in favor, none against, and two abstentions. President Nausėda reiterated that Lukashenko is no longer the legitimate leader of Belarus on the following day. On 15 August 2020, Lithuanian Foreign Minister Linas Linkevičius referred to Lukashenko as the "former president" of Belarus. On 20 August, Lithuanian prime minister Saulius Skvernelis invited Tsikhanouskaya to his office and publicly referred to her as "the national leader of Belarus". On 10 September, a resolution was adopted in the Lithuanian Parliament which recognises Sviatlana Tsikhanouskaya as "the elected leader of the people of Belarus" and the Coordination Council as the "only legitimate representatives of the Belarusian people". The resolution also declares that Alexander Lukashenko is an "illegitimate leader" and accuses Russia of interfering in Belarus's sovereignty.

==== Countries not accepting election result ====
- Albania, as an EU candidate state, has aligned itself with the European Union position declaring that elections were neither free nor fair and condemning the violence.
- Austria is bound by the European Council decision on 19 August to condemn the 9 August elections as neither free nor fair, and therefore does not recognise the results.
- Belgian Foreign Minister Philippe Goffin released a statement that he "deplores the violent crackdown on peaceful protests following the elections in Belarus. Freedom of expression and free press are fundamental rights for the whole of Europe." He encouraged the Belarusian authorities to release the unjustly arrested citizens immediately. The European Council on 19 August decided that the 9 August elections were neither free nor fair, therefore Belgium does not recognise the results.
- The Presidency of Bosnia and Herzegovina decided to follow the stance of the European Union and have ordered the Ministry of Foreign Affairs to formally not accept the election results in Belarus. Therefore, an earlier stance made by Serb member of the Bosnian Presidency, Milorad Dodik, has been disregarded. The other two members of the presidency, Bosniak Šefik Džaferović and Croat Željko Komšić and Minister of Foreign Affairs Bisera Turković say that this decision is in accordance to the policies of the European Union.
- Bulgaria is bound by the European Council decision on 19 August to condemn the 9 August elections as neither free nor fair, and therefore does not recognise the results.
- Canadian Foreign Affairs Minister François-Philippe Champagne stated that Canada was "deeply concerned" by the violence following the elections and that authorities' actions had "further eroded the democratic legitimacy of the vote." He called for the results of Sunday's election "to reflect the will of the people." On 17 August, Champagne stated that the Government of Canada does not accept the results of the "fraudulent" presidential election in Belarus and called for new "free and fair" elections.
- Croatia is bound by the European Council decision on 19 August to condemn the 9 August elections as neither free nor fair, and therefore does not recognise the results.
- Czech Prime Minister Andrej Babiš expressed support for Belarusian protesters, and along with other Czech MPs called for the election to be repeated and for the EU to respond strongly. The European Council on 19 August decided that the 9 August elections were neither free nor fair, therefore the Czech Republic does not recognise the results.
- Denmark, along with the Nordic-Baltic Eight questioned the legitimacy and condemned the violence. The European Council on 19 August decided that the 9 August elections were neither free nor fair, therefore Denmark does not recognise the results.
- The Minister of Foreign Affairs of Estonia criticised the election at a UNSC meeting then stated on 18 August that "The Government of the Republic of Estonia does not recognise the Belarusian election results". The European Council on 19 August decided that the 9 August elections were neither free nor fair, therefore do not recognise the results.
- Finland, along with the Nordic-Baltic Eight questioned the legitimacy and condemned the violence. The European Council on 19 August decided that the 9 August elections were neither free nor fair, therefore do not recognise the results.
- President Emmanuel Macron told Vladimir Putin that he was very worried about the violence that citizens have faced during the election and the current situation in Belarus. The European Council on 19 August decided that the 9 August elections were neither free nor fair, therefore France does not recognise the results.
- (Germany) German government spokesperson Steffen Seibert declared that the minimum standards for democratic elections were not observed during the vote, that the reports of the opposition about election fraud are credible. He also said that the Belarusian political leadership must accept the will of the people and condemn the use of force against peaceful demonstrators and the arrest of journalists and civil rights activists. German Foreign Minister Heiko Maas called for the European Union to discuss sanctions on Belarus. German Chancellor Angela Merkel spoke to Vladimir Putin on 18 August saying that the Belarusian government must avoid using force against peaceful protesters, immediately release political prisoners and start a national dialogue. The European Council on 19 August decided that the 9 August elections were neither free nor fair, therefore do not recognise the results. Angela Merkel whilst offering to mediate said "There is no doubt that there were massive rule violations in the election, the election was neither free nor fair. And that's why the result of the election cannot be recognised."
- Greece is bound by the European Council decision on 19 August to condemn the 9 August elections as neither free nor fair, and therefore does not recognise the results. The Minister of Foreign Affairs confirmed the country is in full agreement with the EU statement of 11 August.
- Hungary is bound by the European Council decision on 19 August to condemn the 9 August elections as neither free nor fair, and therefore does not recognise the results.
- (Republic of Ireland) Irish Foreign Affairs Minister Simon Coveney has stated he was "deeply concerned by this disproportionate and unacceptable level of violence against peaceful protesters" and that Ireland would "coordinate her response in collaboration with her colleagues in the EU". Coveney later said that Ireland does not accept the result of the election claimed by the Lukashenko government. The European Council on 19 August decided that the 9 August elections were neither free nor fair, therefore do not recognise the results.
- Italy is bound by the European Council decision on 19 August to condemn the 9 August elections as neither free nor fair, and therefore does not recognise the results.
- Edgars Rinkēvičs, the Minister of Foreign Affairs of Latvia, stated that as violence against peaceful protests in Belarus continues and there is a lack of political dialogue, Latvia supports the need to introduce individual sanctions against Belarusian officials responsible for the crackdown on protests and election fraud. Latvia also, along with the Nordic-Baltic Eight questioned the legitimacy and condemned the violence. The European Council on 19 August decided that the 9 August elections were neither free nor fair, therefore Latvia does not recognise the results.
- Luxembourg's Foreign Minister Jean Asselborn called for the election to be repeated in addition to new sanctions, targeting Belarus' top officials, and called the Belarusian government actions state terrorism and a dictatorship. The European Council on 19 August decided that the 9 August elections were neither free nor fair, therefore do not recognise the results.
- The Dutch Minister of Foreign Affairs stated: "The Netherlands is concerned about the course of the elections in Belarus last Sunday and its aftermath, especially the harsh police crackdown on peaceful protesters." On 14 August 2020, he stated: "New elections Belarus needed, sanctions not ruled out." on 19 August, Dutch prime Minister Mark Rutte stated that "the Netherlands cannot accept the results of these elections". The European Council on 19 August decided that the 9 August elections were neither free nor fair, therefore do not recognise the results.
- North Macedonia, as an EU candidate state, has aligned itself with the European Union position declaring that elections were neither free nor fair and condemning the violence.
- Montenegro, as an EU candidate state, has aligned itself with the European Union position declaring that elections were neither free nor fair and condemning the violence.
- Poland's Minister of Foreign Affairs Jacek Czaputowicz condemned the violence, appealed to the Belarusian authorities "to start respecting fundamental human rights", and stated that "the harsh reaction, the use of force against peaceful protesters, and arbitrary arrests are unacceptable". Prime Minister of Poland Mateusz Morawiecki also expressed sympathy for the protesters during talks with EU leaders. Additionally, Polish Prime Minister called for an emergency meeting of the European Council concerning the situation in Belarus. The European Council on 19 August decided that the 9 August elections were neither free nor fair, therefore do not recognise the results.
- Portugal is bound by the European Council decision on 19 August to condemn the 9 August elections as neither free nor fair, and therefore does not recognise the results.
- The Romanian Ministry of Foreign Affairs Bogdan Aurescu said he was "very concerned" about the situation of Belarus and that the "only way" was to stop the violence and start a political dialogue. He also urged the country to respect fundamental human rights. The European Council on 19 August decided that "the 9 August elections were neither free nor fair, therefore do not recognise the results". Up to 200 important figures in the country sent a letter to the President Klaus Iohannis and other government officials to ask them to support civil society and human rights in Belarus. They claimed that Romania should state clearly that it does not support the regime of Lukashenko and that it should cut off diplomatic relations in case the repression of protesters continued. The letter compared the events with the Romanian Revolution of 1989 and the Romanian protests of 2017–2019.
- Serbia, as an EU candidate state, has aligned itself with the European Union position declaring that elections were neither free nor fair and condemning the violence.
- (Slovakia) Minister of Foreign and European Affairs of the Slovak Republic, Ivan Korčok, labelled the Belarusian government's interventions against its political opponents and citizens peacefully expressing their opinion as unacceptable. The Slovak Republic "appeals to president Lukashenko to abide by the basic principles of democracy and freedom of expression. No one can be persecuted for expressing their views." President Zuzana Čaputová stated: "I condemn the use of force and repressions against people of Belarus freely exercising their freedom of speech and assembly. Fundamental freedoms and human rights must always be respected and protected." On 10 August 2020, she expressed solidarity with Belarusian people by lighting the Slovak Presidential Palace with red and white lights. The European Council on 19 August decided that the 9 August elections were neither free nor fair, therefore do not recognise the results.
- At a press conference with U.S. Secretary of State Mike Pompeo during his visit to Slovenia on 13 August 2020, Slovenian Prime Minister Janez Janša expressed his concern over current situation in Belarus and called for new free election under wide international observance. He also stated that Slovenia is gathering support within the EU to increase an international pressure on Belarus. The European Council on 19 August decided that the 9 August elections were neither free nor fair, therefore do not recognise the results.
- (Sweden) Swedish Minister for Foreign Affairs, Ann Linde, expressed concerns over how protesters in Belarus were beaten and arrested. She said that the election in Belarus was neither democratic nor fair and that it follows the same pattern as previous elections in Belarus. She demanded that all arrested protesters be released. On 18 August, Prime Minister Stefan Löfven issued a statement where he condemned "the violence and arrests used against peaceful demonstrators, for which the Belarusian regime and authorities are responsible". Additionally, former Prime Minister Carl Bildt said that Lukashenko's time as president was finished. The European Council on 19 August decided that "[t]he 9 August elections were neither free nor fair, therefore do not recognise the results."
- Spain is bound by the European Council decision on 19 August to condemn the 9 August elections as neither free nor fair, and therefore does not recognise the results.
- (United Kingdom) The UK Foreign and Commonwealth Office initially expressed concern and called for the authorities "to refrain from further acts of violence following the seriously flawed Presidential elections." It acknowledged that there had "been a lack of transparency throughout the electoral process." On 17 August the Foreign Secretary stated that "the UK does not accept the results" and called the election "fraudulent".
- Secretary of State Mike Pompeo issued a press statement on August 10 declaring that the United States was "deeply concerned" over the conduct of the presidential election in Belarus, stating it was not free and fair. He claimed that "severe restrictions on ballot access for candidates, [the] prohibition of local independent observers at polling stations, intimidation tactics employed against opposition candidates, and the detentions of peaceful protesters and journalists marred the process." He urged the Belarusian government to refrain from using force, and called on it to respect the rights of all Belarusians to assemble peacefully. The administration criticized the use of internet shutdowns and detention of opposition supporters and called for those detained to be released. Separately, White House Press Secretary Kayleigh McEnany reaffirmed the statements and positions of the Secretary of State regarding the voting process, detentions and protests. On 17 August, President Donald Trump called it a "terrible situation" unfolding in Belarus. On 11 September 2020, Deputy Secretary of State Stephen Biegun stated that "the people have clearly rejected the regime" and said that the US government would work with European countries in imposing targeted sanctions against Belarus. The United States officially rejected the election results on 24 September.

==== Countries questioning legitimacy of election ====
- Iceland, along with the Nordic-Baltic Eight questioned the legitimacy and condemned the violence.
- The Japanese Foreign Affairs Ministry is closely monitoring the situation with concern and urges the authorities of the Republic of Belarus to immediately cease acts of violence and arbitrary detention of participants of peaceful protests, as well as alleged ill-treatment of those who have been detained. Japan strongly calls for a dialogue among a wide range of domestic political groups in Belarus, so that the stability and development of the country can be ensured in a manner which reflects the collective will of the Belarusian people and respects the principles of the rule of law and democracy.
- The Norwegian Minister of Foreign Affairs Ine Marie Eriksen Søreide condemned the use of force in Belarus: "This use of violence is unacceptable. We call on the Belarusian authorities to release the arrested protesters and journalists immediately." Norway, along with the Nordic-Baltic Eight questioned the legitimacy and condemned the violence.
- Ministry of Foreign Affairs of Ukraine issued a joint statement with Poland and Lithuania. Andriy Yermak, head of the Office of the President of Ukraine also appealed to Belarusian authorities to release Ukrainian human rights activists and journalists detained in Belarus. Ukrainian president Volodymyr Zelenskyy expressed regret at the questionable legitimacy of the official election results and the conflict that followed their announcement. He urged Belarus to refrain from violence and to initiate a wide, open dialogue between the government and the citizens. He also called for the authorities "to adhere to democratic standards universally recognized in the civilized world" and urged them to do their best to ensure that the rights and freedoms of the people are maintained. Zelenskyy also stated, "Ukraine and I personally are extremely interested in Belarus being a truly independent and democratic country with a strong economy and stable social relations." Zelenskyy also cancelled his planned October state visit to Minsk due to the protests. Ukraine recalled its ambassador from Minsk on 17 August. On 15 September 2020, the Verkhovna Rada (Ukraine's national parliament) passed a resolution stating that the elections were neither free nor fair and do not represent the will of the Belarusian citizens.

==== Countries that condemned conflict escalation ====
- Afghanistan voted to condemn the Belarusian government for its crackdowns.
- Argentina voted to condemn the Belarusian government for its crackdowns.
- (Australia) Australian Foreign Minister Marise Payne has expressed concern about the use of force against protesters, the imprisonment of opposition activists and the lack of transparency in the presidential election.
- Brazil voted to condemn the Belarusian government for its crackdowns.
- Bolivia, under the Jeanine Áñez administration, signed a joint letter at the United Nations, condemning the crackdown.
- Chile voted to condemn the Belarusian government for its crackdowns.
- Costa Rica signed a joint letter at the United Nations, condemning the crackdown.
- Fiji voted to condemn the Belarusian government for its crackdowns.
- Ghana signed a joint letter at the United Nations, condemning the crackdown.
- Israel signed a joint letter at the United Nations, condemning the crackdown.
- Marshall Islands voted to condemn the Belarusian government for its crackdowns.
- Mexico voted to condemn the Belarusian government for its crackdowns.
- Micronesia signed a joint letter at the United Nations, condemning the crackdown.
- Monaco signed a joint letter at the United Nations, condemning the crackdown.
- New Zealand at the UN Human Rights Council said they are "deeply concerned about the deterioration and the human rights situation in Belarus since the presidential election in August."
- Peru voted to condemn the Belarusian government for its crackdowns.
- San Marino was one of the countries to sponsor a UNHRC resolution condemning the conflict.
- South Korea voted to condemn the Belarusian government for its crackdowns.
- The Federal Department of Foreign Affairs of Switzerland expressed concern over the protests following the election. It urged the Belarusian government to exercise restraint.
- Uruguay voted to condemn the Belarusian government for its crackdowns.

==== Criticism within congratulating countries ====
- Prime Minister Nikol Pashinyan's congratulation was widely criticized in Armenia. A number of Armenian pro-democracy NGOs released a statement in support of the protest movement. On 14 August, a small march in central Yerevan was held in support of the protests. On 10 September, another protest occurred in front of the Embassy of Belarus in Armenia. The protesters demanded the release of political prisoners.
- After a photo appeared that showed Lukashenko standing with former Kyrgyz prime minister Daniyar Usenov and former Kyrgyz president Kurmanbek Bakiyev, the Foreign Ministry of Kyrgyzstan protested to the Belarusian embassy in Kyrgyzstan about the photo.
- (Moldova) A group of protesters demonstrated in front of the Belarusian embassy in Chișinău. They came with banners saying "Down with dictatorship!", "Down with censorship!", "Belarus will be free!" and other messages opposing Lukashenko. The protesters said they felt the need to protest after Moldovan former President Igor Dodon had allowed himself to congratulate Lukashenko on behalf of the entire Moldovan people.
- (Russia) Multiple demonstrations took place in front of the Belarusian embassy in Moscow condemning Lukashenko's government and commemorating those who died during the protests. Some protesters in Khabarovsk expressed solidarity with protesters in Belarus.
- In Venezuela, disputed president Juan Guaidó commented on the situation comparing his country to the Belarusian protests while preparing for its upcoming elections: "We have to reinvent ourselves but the scheme is the same, it is the demonstration, the protests, the strike, the consultation."

== International sanctions ==
- (European Union) EU High Representative for Foreign Affairs and Security Policy Josep Borrell on 14 August announced that the EU would bring in sanctions against Belarusian officials responsible for "violence and falsification". Charles Michel, President of the European Council went further on 19 August saying the EU would soon impose sanctions on a "substantial number" of individuals responsible for violence, repression, and election fraud. The European Commission announced it would divert 53 million euros (£48m) earmarked for Belarus away from the government and towards civil society.
- In December 2020, the International Olympic Committee imposed sanctions on Alexander Lukashenko, Viktor Lukashenko, the Belarusian Olympic Committee (its NOC), and all other members of its executive board.
- (Lithuania) On 18 August 2020, the Lithuanian parliament agreed to impose economic sanctions.
- On 19 August 2020, the Prime Minister of Slovakia stated that the Government of Slovakia introduced sanctions against Belarus in the new legislative session.
