= First inauguration of Alexander Lukashenko =

1994 presidential inauguration of Alexander Lukashenko
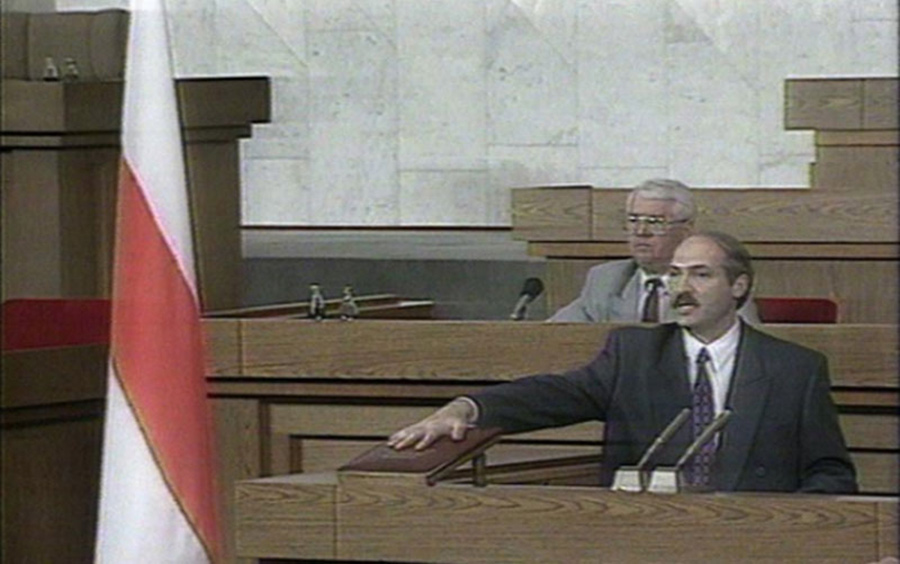
- Alexander Lukashenko in 1994
- Date: 20 July 1994; 32 years ago
- Location: Government House Minsk
- Participants: President of Belarus, Alexander Lukashenko Assuming office Chairman of the Supreme Council of Belarus, Myechyslaw Hryb Administering oath

The first inauguration of Alexander Lukashenko as president of the Republic of Belarus took place on Wednesday, 20 July 1994. The ceremony was held at the Government House in Minsk. It was the first presidential inauguration ceremony in the history of Belarus.

== Background ==
The office of president of Belarus was introduced in the 1994 constitution and the first presidential election was held on 23 June and 10 July 1994. Alexander Lukashenko won in the second round, running on a populist platform, with more than 80 percent of the vote.

== Inaugural events ==
Lukashenko took an oath on a podium and holding his hand on a copy of the country's constitution. After the oath, the Belarusian anthem was performed.

=== Oath ===
The following oath was read by Lukashenko (his right hand on the country's constitution) at his inauguration:

Assuming the office of President of the Republic of Belarus, I solemnly swear to serve the people of the Republic of Belarus, observe the Constitution and laws of the Republic of Belarus, and to discharge strictly and conscientiously the lofty duties that have been bestowed upon me.

Lukashenko began his post-oath speech with a reference to Abraham Lincoln and the nature of true democracy:

"It is impossible to get out of this crisis without a common purpose and without common labour"

== Aftermath ==
Following Lukashenko's election as the president of Belarus, the process of democratic backsliding began, culminating with the confrontation with the Supreme Council and the 1995-1996 constitutional crisis, which he won. The 1995 referendum strengthened his power and replaced the white-red-white flag with this similar to the Byelorussian SSR, and the 1996 referendum eliminated the last democratic checks and balances, thus turning Belarus into an authoritarian dictatorship.
