= Irreligion in Russia =

Religion in Russia as of 2012 (Sreda Arena Atlas)
Russian Orthodoxy	41%
Unaffiliated Christians	4.1%
Other Christians and other religions	1.7%
Other Orthodox	1.5%
Islam	6.5%
Rodnovery, Tengrism and other native faiths	1.2%
Tibetan Buddhism	0.5%
Spiritual but not religious	25%
Atheism	13%
Undetermined/undecided	5.5%

Irreligion was the official state policy during the Soviet Union and was rigorously enforced. This led to the persecution of Christians in the country. Since the collapse of Communism, Russia had seen an upsurge of religious identification, but observance remained low. Adding together those who are undecided, those who are spiritual but not religious, and those who are atheistic, as of a 2012 survey, 38% of Russians claim no particular religious affiliation. According to Pew Research Centre in 2017, only 7% of Russians attend church services weekly, 30% monthly or yearly, while 61% seldom attend at all or simply never do. In 2026 it was reported that attendance at religious services does not exceed 3% amongst Orthodox Russians.

Many Russian secularists feel that the new religious establishments are now abusing the system for their own advantage despite the separation of church and state in the Russian Constitution.

== History ==
=== Atheism in the Russian Empire ===
==== 18th century ====
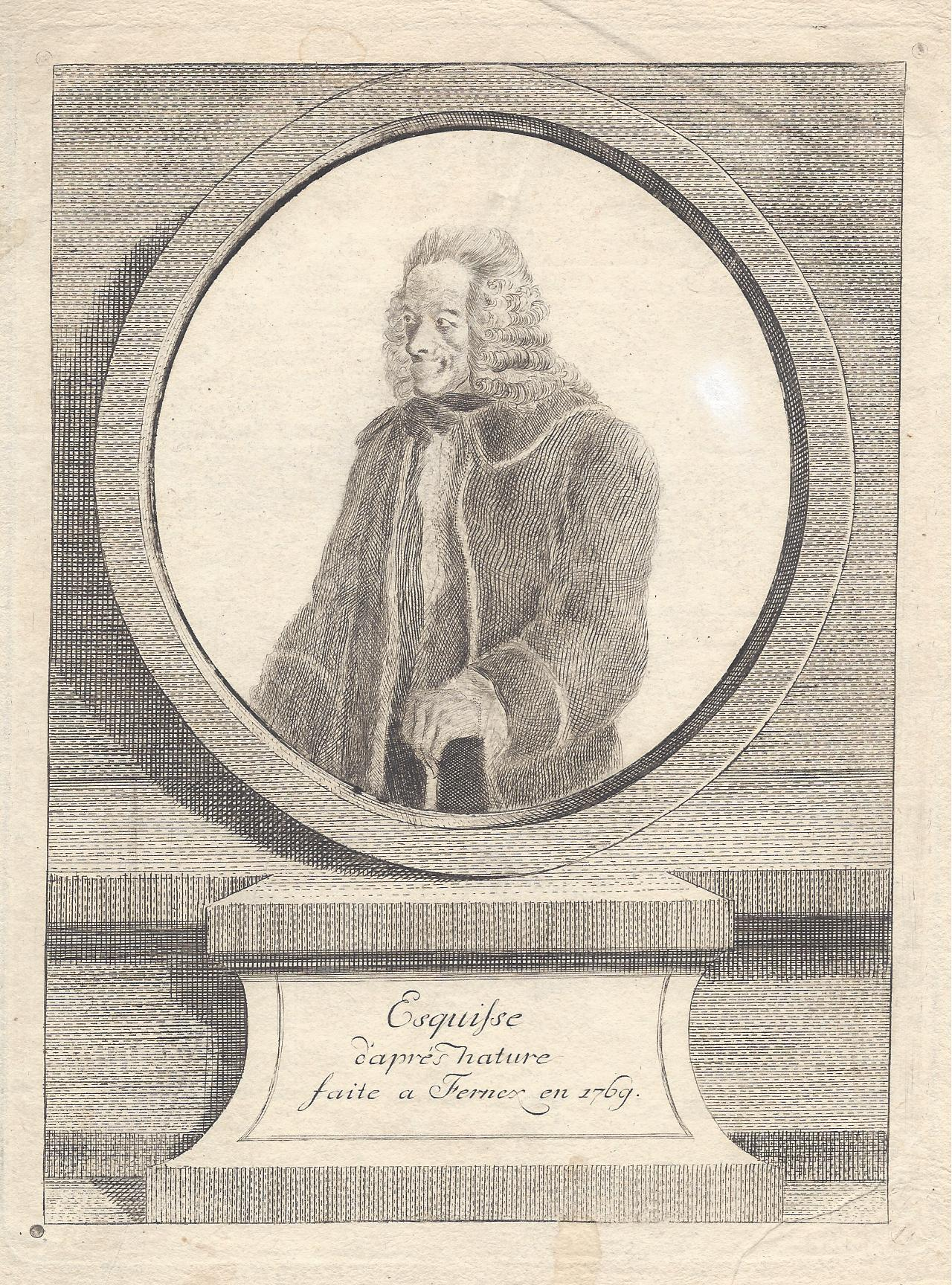
Voltaire, year 1769

In the Russian Empire, the atheistic worldview began to permeate in connection with the growing popularity of the ideas of Voltaire in the mid-18th century, but the number of radical atheists was still insignificant. Most of the supporters of this trend adhered to Deismistic views, since, according to the Russian historian Vladimir Nikolaevich, "Russian society in the mass understood deism as the absence of God".

The future Empress Catherine II as early as the 1740s and 1750s became acquainted with Voltaire's original works, which practically did not contain the propaganda of materialism and atheism, to which he had just begun to join at that time, but afterwards her interest in them faded away. Along with this, being a Voltairean, Catherine was carried away by reading and analyzing the "Historical and Critical Dictionary" by Protestant Pierre Bayle, from which the principle of toleration, embodied during all her reign, was derived.

In 1767, Catherine made an attempt to reform the Russian Orthodox Church, subject to the following amendments to the Holy Synod: to allow Old Believers in the post to use a number of dishes, as well as shorten the duration of posts; on top of that, she worked to remove from the houses of the icon, eliminate a number of Christian holidays, replace the lengthy services with short, evening and all-night vigil - with brief prayers with instruction, allow bishops to have a wife, change the form of clergymen to a more Secular variety, eliminate some difficulties about the need for divorce, to allow marriages between relatives and representatives of different faiths and finally to liquidate the commemoration of the deceased and so on.

Members of the Synod ignored these amendments, realizing that as a result of their implementation, the authority of the empress and the church will be significantly undermined. After the death of Voltaire, the empress ordered 100 complete collections of works by the thinker so that "they serve as a teaching that they will be studied, confirmed by heart so that the minds will eat them," and even planned to erect a monument to the philosopher in St Petersburg. Great French Revolution Voltaire's busts, standing in the living rooms and corridors Winter Palace, were demolished, the publication of his writings is prohibited, the available copies were confiscated.

As a result of these events, Catherine II was fully introduced to Orthodoxy as a religion capable of destroying "atheism, pagan, immoral, anarchic, villainous, diabolical, hostile to God and the apostles".

For a certain period of time, among the courtiers of the Russian Empire, the Empress was popular with jokes about religion, the demonstration of godlessness and the exaltation of Voltaire as a philosopher who came to the world in order to free him from superstition.

Voltaire himself, referring to the state of religion in the Russian Empire, said: "... the whole yard of the Russian Empire ... consists of deists, despite all the superstitions with which the Greek church is still permeated." The doctrine was successful not only among representatives of the higher class, like the princess Yekaterina Vorontsova-Dashkova,, Alexander Michailowitsch Belosselski, Countess Ekaterina Petrovna Trubeckaja, Alexander Vorontsov, Dmitri Alekseyevich Gallitzin, but also the average Russian. However, with regard to the views of the empress and her supporters, a number of people from both the middle and upper classes expressed dissatisfaction, including the prince Mikhail Shcherbatov ("Catherine" ... is enamored with the meaningless reading of new writers, the Christian law, although she piously pretends to be pious, and for nothing reveres. "Although she does not hide her thoughts, but many times in her conversations open" Famous writer Denis Fonvizin ("..." I entered into close service with one prince, a young writer, and entered a society, to which I can not remember until now without fear.

For it was better to pass the time in blasphemy and blasphemy. In the first I did not take any part and shuddered, hearing the curse of atheists; And I played the blasphemous role in blasphemy myself ... At that time I composed a message to Shumilov, in which some of the poems reveal my misconception at the time, so I have been called an atheist by many people. "

The number of Russian atheists of that time included a large part of Masons, later disillusioned at godlessness and converted to Orthodoxy. (Note: Including the most prominent masons of the Russian Empire P. Elagin (1725-1794) and V. Lopukhin (1756-1816))

==== 19th Century ====
At least as of 1899, it was not allowed to not have any religion. The "Penal Code on Penalties and Corrections" of August 15, 1845 for the withdrawal from Orthodoxy provided for liability in the form of hard labor for a period of eight to ten years.

=== 20th Century ===
In Soviet Union, state atheism was an essential part of the state ideology. In Constitution of Russia (and subsequently in USSR Constitution, along with freedom of religion was also for the first time in the world. Freedom is fixed anti-religious propaganda struggle against religion was the task of a number of public organizations (League of Militant Atheists (1925-1947), society "Knowledge" (since 1947)). As a rule, anti-religious propaganda was conducted in parallel with popularization of scientific knowledge. In 1964 the Institute of Scientific Atheism was established, and it existed until 1991.

== Number of atheists ==
Estimates of the number of atheists vary greatly due to the different interpretation of the concept of atheism and the non-existence of an official census on religion.

According to the sociological survey conducted in August 2012 a, non-religious and atheists themselves were called by 12.9% of Russians.

In a Levada Center study in November 2012, 5% of respondents called themselves atheists, 10% said they did not belong to any religion.

According to FOM as of June 2013, 25% of Russians do not consider themselves to be believers.

In the framework of the study "Arena: Atlas of Religions and Nationalities", conducted by the Environment Service in 2012, 13% of Russians stated that they do not believe in God.

According to the data of all-Russian surveys, atheists prefer to live in another country more often than average and are more likely to be men, and most atheists in Primorsky Territory (35%), Altai Territory (27%), Yakutia (26%), Novosibirsk Region (25%), and the Amur Region (24%).

== Attitude to other supernatural beliefs ==
In a 2005 interview, Andrey Kuraev said:

I have already said that there are almost no atheists in Russia. Atheist today should be entered in Red Book as a creature worthy of care and protection.<...>in reality there is the most mass religion of our time - occultism. And if you talk with a person who claims that he is not Orthodox or Muslim, that he does not believe in God, then it turns out - in most cases, some beliefs and even religious practice in his life are present. Let it be an interest in horoscopes, an appeal to healers. Such domestic low magical religiosity is omnipresent. And so people who lived their lives not only without looking at the Bible or the Koran, but without taking into account popular magic television programs and advice, including astrological ones, are extremely few.

== The rights of atheists in Russia ==
The Constitution of the Russian Federation "establishes the secular character of the state." No religion can be established as 'public or mandatory' (Article 14). Article 19 of the Constitution establishes the equality of religious associations before the law and their separation from the state. Article 28 guarantees freedom of religion - the right to confess individually or in community with others to any religion, "or not to profess any", "freely choose," "have and distribute" religious and other Beliefs "and act in accordance with them.

The Law "On Education" establishes the secular nature of public education. The creation and operation of organizational structures [ of political parties and religious organizations (associations) in state and municipalities educational institutions are not allowed. Pedagogical workers can not, in the framework of educational activity, compel students to accept political, religious or other beliefs or refuse them. The law "On Freedom of Conscience and Religious Associations" establishes the right of every citizen to profess individually or jointly with others any religion or not to profess any, freely choose and change, have and disseminate religious and other beliefs and act In accordance with them, if this does not contradict the need to protect the rights and legitimate interests of citizens and the security of the state. Discrimination on religious grounds is not allowed. Nobody is obliged to report their attitude to religion and can not be forced to participate or not to participate in religious activities. It is prohibited to involve Age of majority in religious associations, as well as the education of juvenile religions contrary to their will and without the consent of Kinship or their substitutes.

== Famous Russian atheists ==
- Vitaly Ginzburg (1916–2009) - Soviet and Russian theoretical physicist, academician RAS (1991, academician Academy of Sciences of the USSR (since 1966), Doctor of Physics and Mathematics, laureate Nobel Prize in Physics (2003). Actively opposed the introduction of a compulsory course DIC, the inclusion of Theology in the list of disciplines HAC, etc.
- Sergey Dorenko (1959–2019) - a Russian television journalist, often makes anti-religious statements.
- Alexander Nevzorov - Soviet and Russian TV journalist. A video lecture course "Lessons of Atheism" is conducted on Internet television.
- Vladimir Posner - a Soviet and Russian television journalist, TV presenter, the first president of the Academy of Russian Television.

== See also ==
- Religion in Russia
- Religion in the Soviet Union

== Bibliography ==
- Glagolev, V. S. [in Russian]; Evdokimov, V. I. [in Russian] (1970). Атеистическое воспитание [Atheistic upbringing]. Great Soviet Encyclopedia (in Russian). Vol. 2.
- Novikov, M. P., ed. (1985). Атеизм в СССР [Atheism in the USSR]. Атеистический словарь [Atheistic Dictionary] (2nd, revised ed.). Мoscow: Politizdat. p. 512.
- Skazkin, S. D., ed. (1987). Настольная книга атеиста [Atheist's Handbook] (9th, revised and expanded ed.). Мoscow: Politizdat. p. 431.
- Tazhurizina, Z. А. [in Russian] (1979). Актуальные вопросы истории атеизма [Current Issues in the History of Atheism]. Мoscow: Moscow University.
- Tazhurizina, Z. А. (2010). Исследование истории атеизма в СССР (20–30-е годы) [Study of the history of atheism in the USSR (20-30s)]. In V. V. Schmidt; I. N. Yablokova (eds.). Вопросы религии и религиоведения [Questions of religion and religious studies]. Мoscow: MediaProm.
- Voronitsyn, Ivan Petrovich [in Russian] (1933). История атеизма [The History of Atheism]. Vol. IV. Moscow: Атеист (Atheist).
- Zhuravskij, А. V. [in Russian] (2009). Генезис и формы постсоветского атеизма в России [Genesis and Forms of Post-Soviet Atheism in Russia]. Вопросы религии и религиоведения [Questions of religion and religious studies]. Мoscow: MediaProm. p. 586. Archived from the original on 2001-12-24. (Copy)
