= Timeline of the 2020–2021 Belarusian protests =

The 2020–2021 Belarusian protests were a series of political demonstrations and protests against the Belarusian government and President Alexander Lukashenko. The largest anti-government protests in the history of Belarus, the demonstrations began in the lead-up to and during the 2020 presidential election, in which Lukashenko sought his sixth term in office. In response to the demonstrations, a number of relatively small pro-government rallies were held.

== Timeline ==
=== 2020 ===
==== August ====
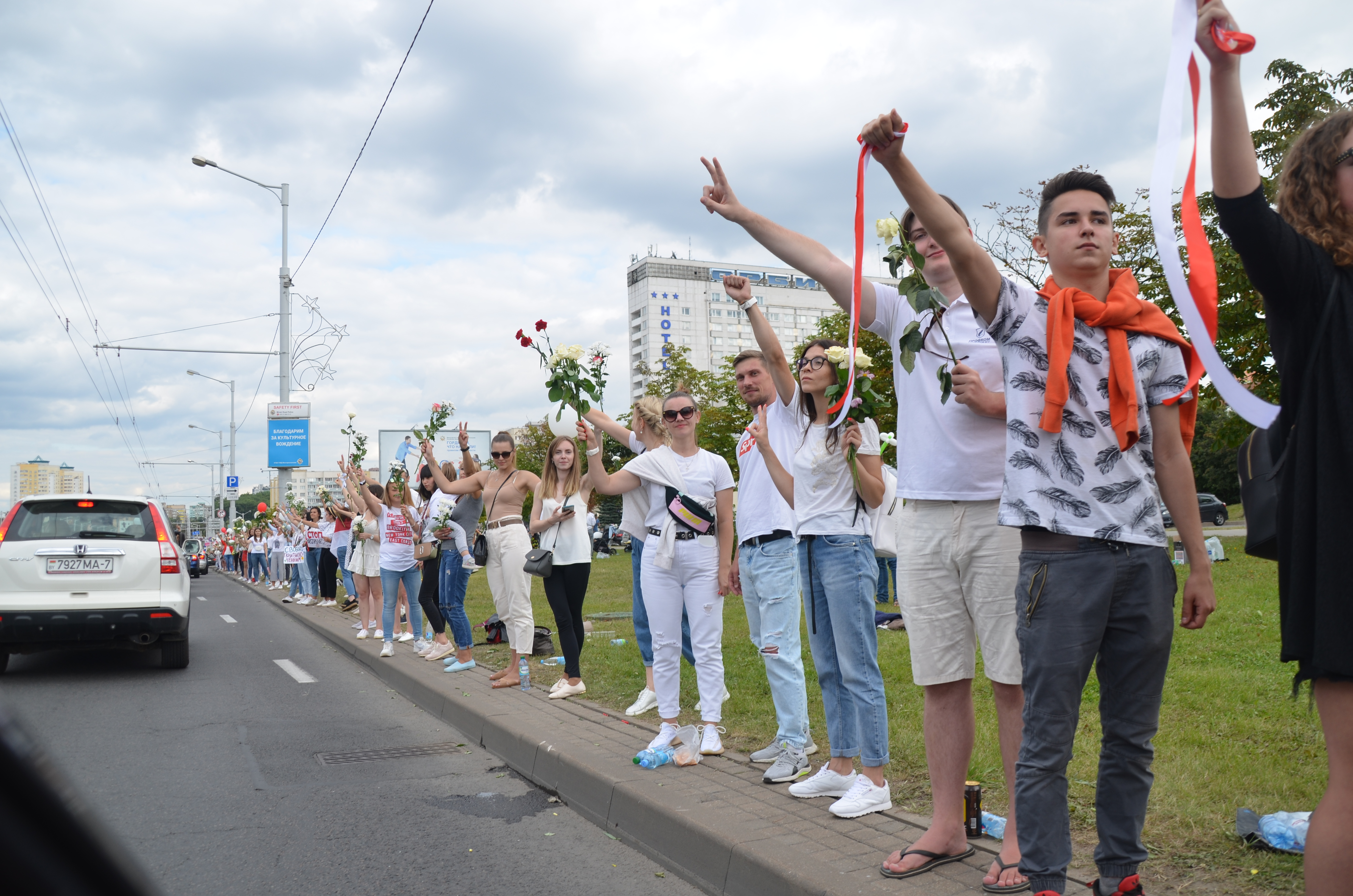
Protesters in Minsk on 14 August

As the protests swept across Belarus following the election results, the primary opposition candidate Sviatlana Tsikhanouskaya published a video saying that she left Belarus for Lithuania. She was presumed to have been coerced to leave while also submitting a complaint to the CEC (Central Election Commission of Belarus).

On 11 August, during the evening, the protests continued in the major cities of Belarus, including Brest, Homel, Hrodna, Mahiliou, Viciebsk, Baranavichy, Maladzyechna, Navahrudak, Navapolatsk and Zhodzina. In Minsk, protesters changed their tactics, switching positions from one part of the city to another, similar to the "be water" tactics used in the 2019–2020 protests in Hong Kong. Protesters barricaded the area around the Riga Market in the center of Minsk. Government forces responded by using tear gas, throwing stun grenades and firing rubber bullets at the protesters at close range. A demonstrator, Alexander Taraikovsky, died near Pushkinskaya metro station.

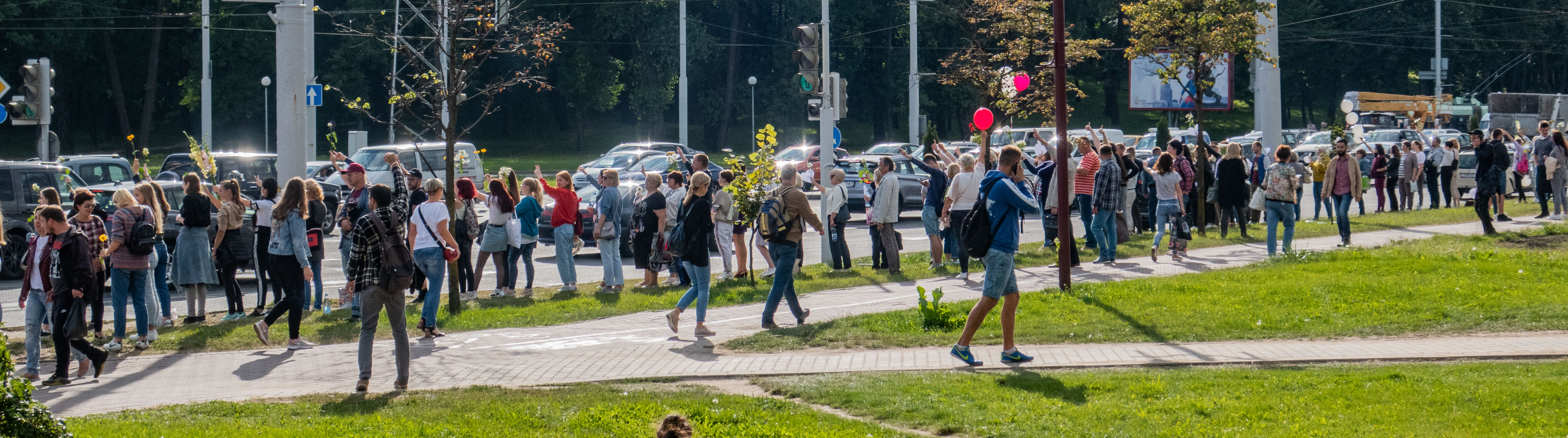
One of the female lines of solidarity and protest in Minsk (13 August)

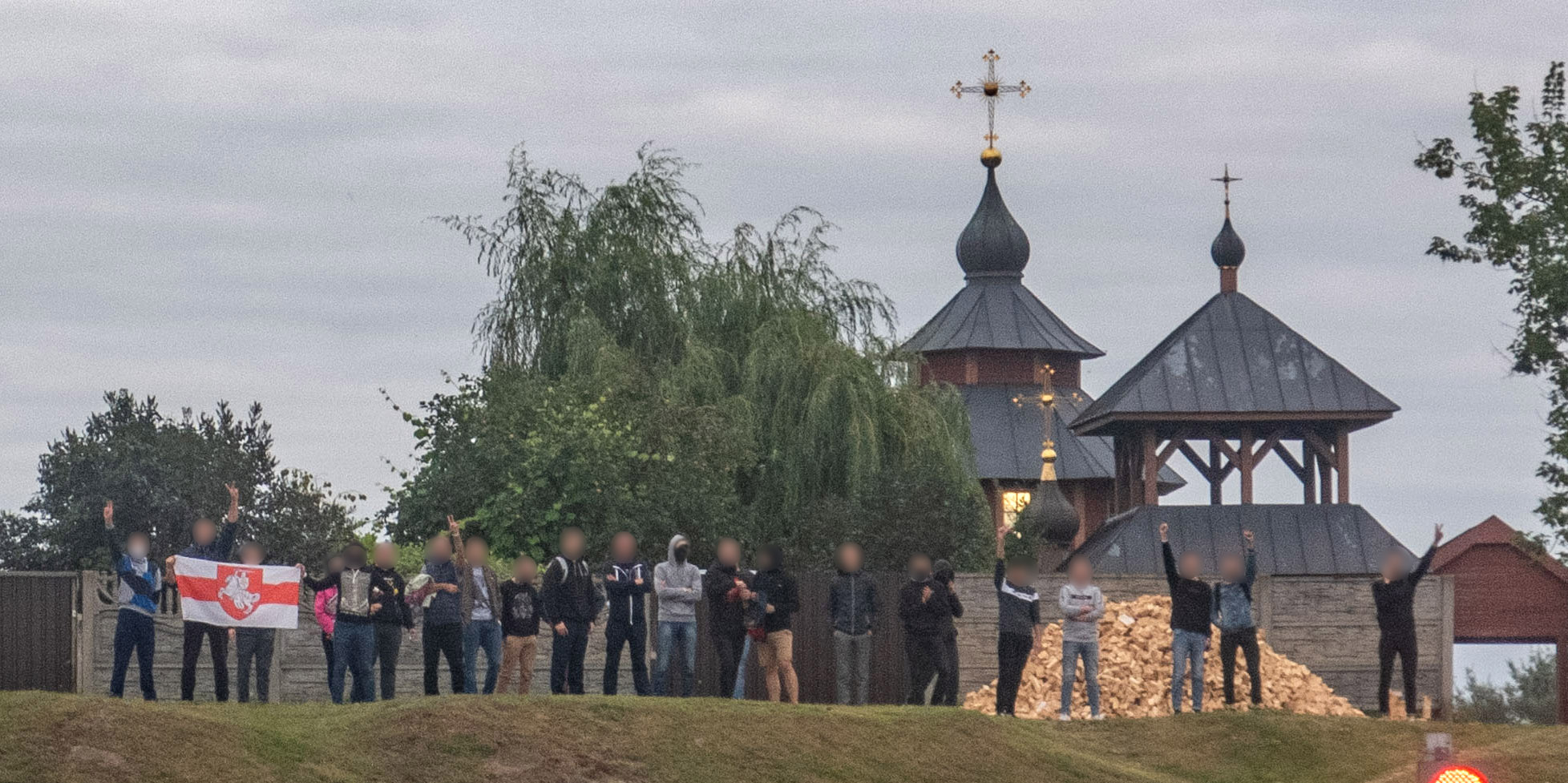
Protesters near a church in Minsk (12 August)

The government's riot police (AMAP/OMON), internal troops, and anti-terrorist "Almaz" elite special force participated in the suppression of the protests in Minsk. Water cannons were used near the Riga Market, and rubber bullets were widely used. Mass protests were reported. It was reported that AMAP/OMON squads seized some ambulances or used visually similar vans to deceive the protesters into allowing them through the barricades.

On 11 August, the protests resumed in Minsk and other major cities. Rubber bullets and stun grenades were widely used. One death was reported, with Hienadz Shutau, in critical condition and with severe brain damage as of 14 August, succumbing to his injuries on 19 August in Minsk.

Molotov cocktails were thrown at security officials in Minsk. Activists built barricades and burned tires near the Riga Market. Telegram channel Nexta, used by the opposition, published messages alleging violence by law enforcement officers. Telegram published aggressive vocabulary against law enforcement, such as "punishers" and "fascists". Telegram was one of the few accessible resources during a concurrent internet blackout and VPN usage was ubiquitous, with Psiphon usage skyrocketing. On the evening of 11 August, while the Internet shutdown continued, 45 percent of people using Telegram protest chats in Belarus were online, despite the government's efforts to block online access.

In Homel, a 25-year-old man died on 12 August after waiting in a security forces detainee van for many hours in hot weather. He had a heart condition and wasn't given proper medical attention in time. Also in Homel, relatives and friends of over 500 arrested people were not allowed to visit them. The local police did not disclose any information about their relatives. It was also reported that a policewoman abused an arrested woman there.

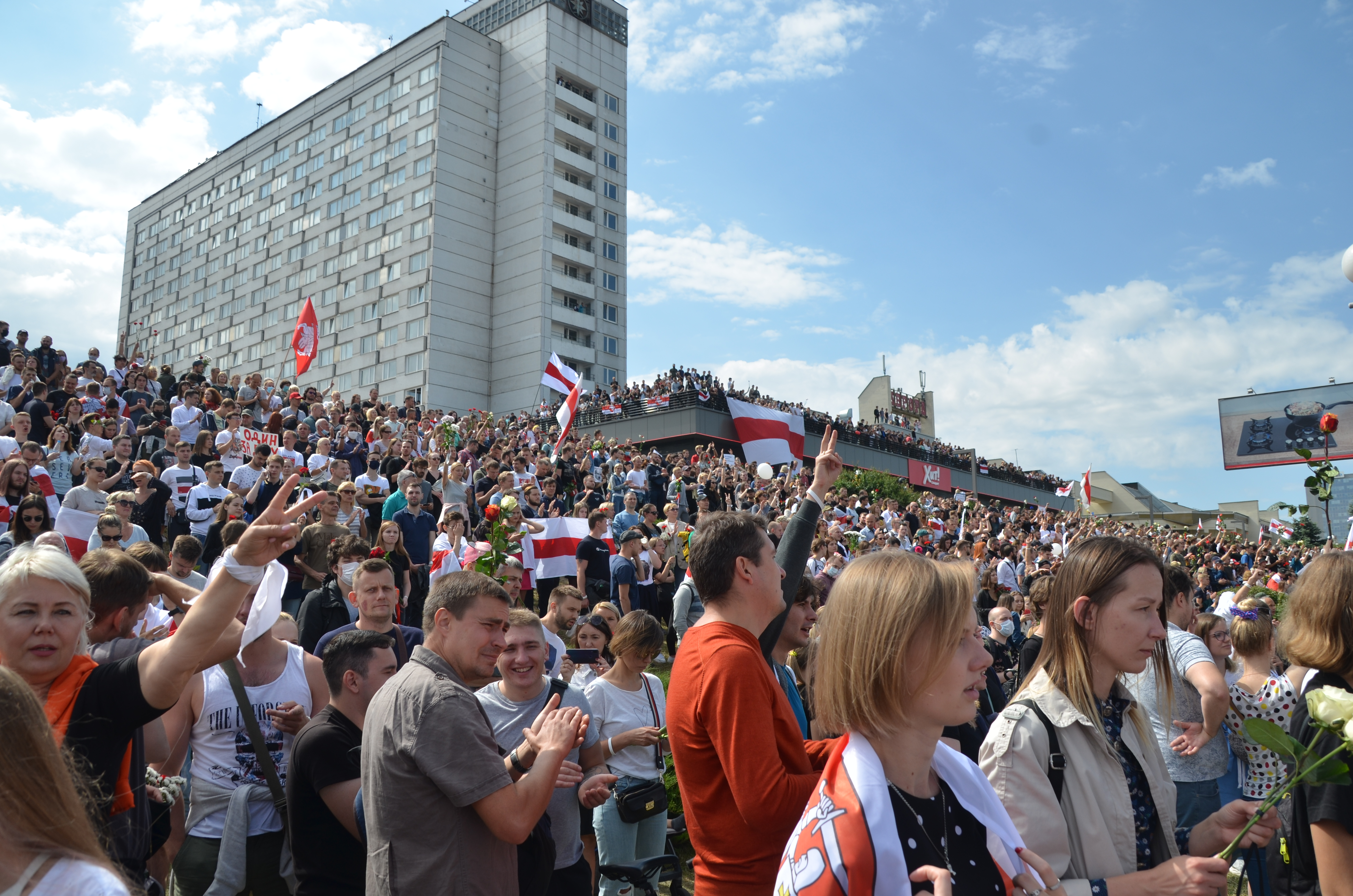
Protesters in Minsk on 15 August

During widespread protests in Hrodna, a 5-year-old was injured, and their father was arrested after the car they were in was rammed by government forces.

On 12 August, people in Minsk and later in other cities lined up on the streets to protest against the government's suppression. The majority of the protesters were women wearing white clothes. Former members of the Belarusian military, police and special forces expressed their solidarity with the opposition by publishing videos publicly throwing their uniforms in the garbage, condemning violent acts by the security forces, and calling on the authorities to stop opposing the will of the people.

On the same day, the Belarus Interior Minister stated that a "shoot to kill" policy in cases of self-defense was permitted.

In many places in Minsk, riot police were observed moving in ambulances and shooting at people, stopping near crowds, which is a violation of the 1949 Geneva Convention.

On 13 August, many lines of protesters demonstrating in solidarity against violence by the police were observed, including thousands of women dressed in white. Strikes of workers in several state-owned factories also took place.

External images
- Protesters in Minsk
- Protesters in Minsk
- Female first line of protesters in Minsk
- Protesters and government troops in Brest
- Protesters in Homiel
- Wounded protester
- Government troops
- Water cannons in use
- Barricade in Minsk (graffiti "3%" refers to the protesters' view at the approval rating of Lukashenko)
- AMAP/OMON beating protesters and passers-by
- Trucks with government troopers in Minsk
- Arrest
- Arrest of a biker
- AMAP/OMON trooper beating random passer-by
- Internal trooper firing a shotgun
- "Almaz" anti-terrorist squad; one of them has GM-94 portable grenade launcher
- Protester beaten up in a detention centre
- Policeman and female protesters in Minsk
- Female protestors being arrested in Minsk

Numerous reports of different law violations in Belarusian prisons (severe overcrowding, beating, and abuses against prisoners, including torture) were submitted.

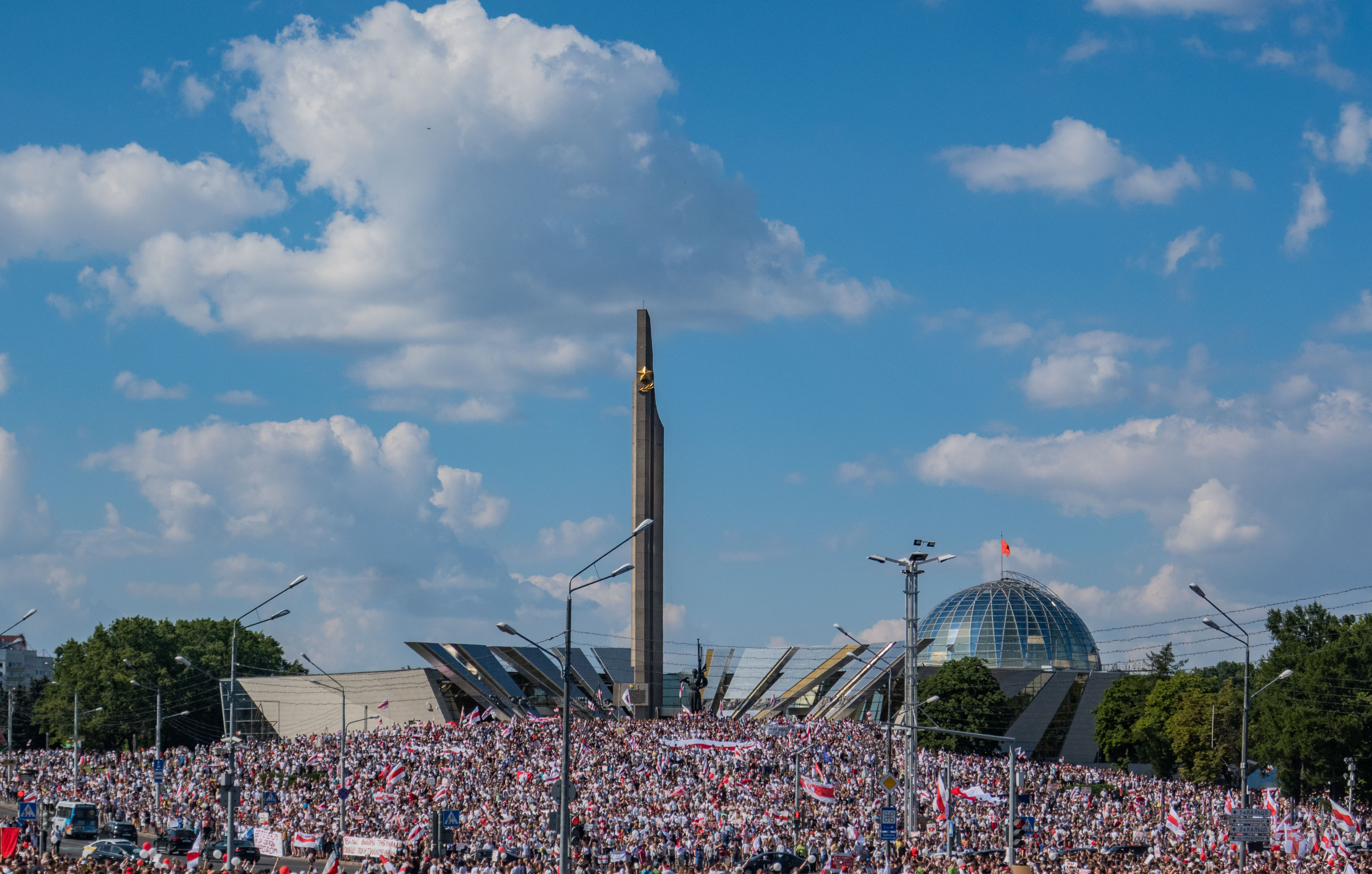
Protest rally in Minsk, 16 August

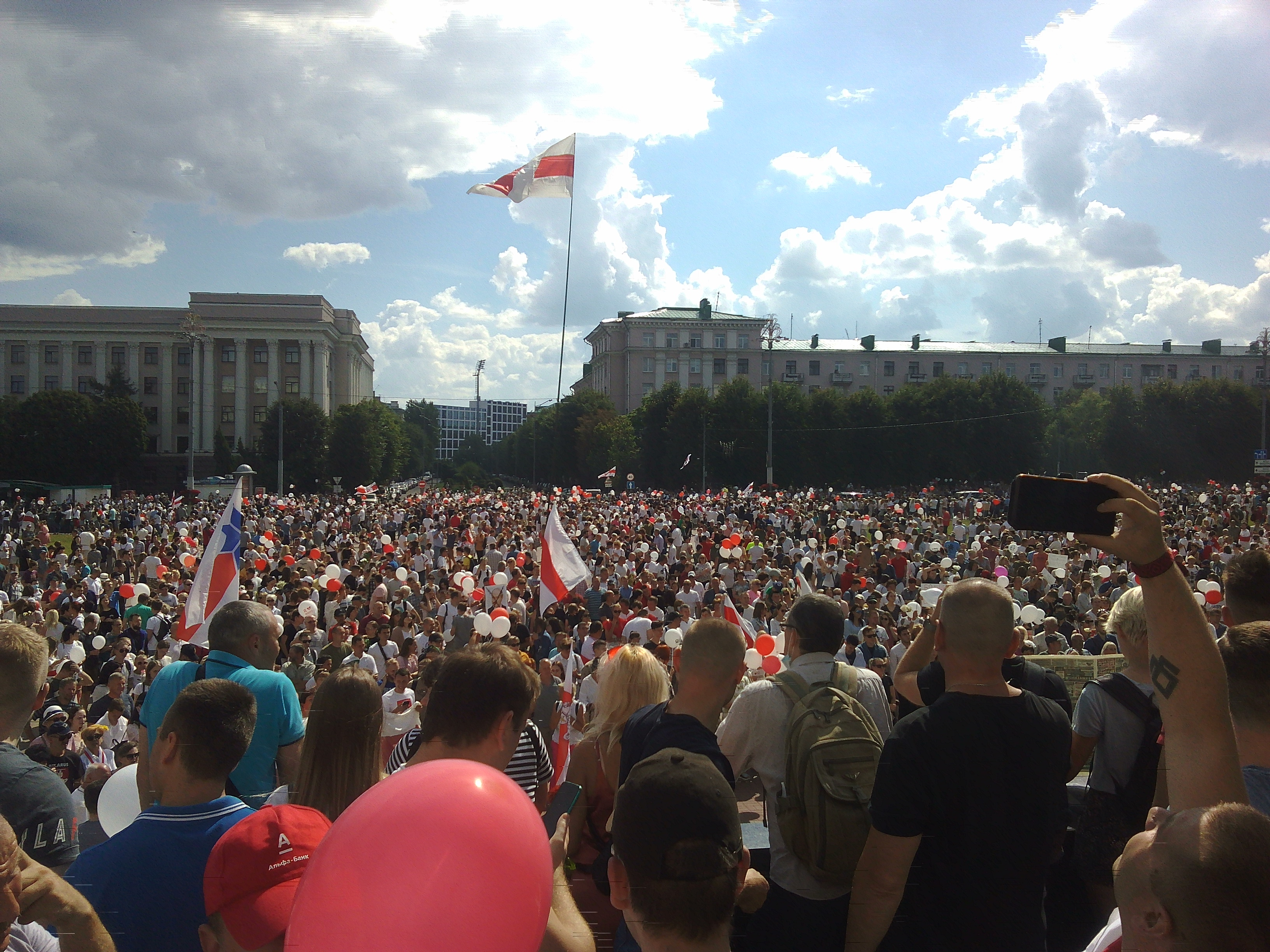
Protest rally in Mahiliou, 16 August

On 14 August, peaceful protests continued nationwide. Workers from Minsk Tractor Works also joined the protest in front of the Government House in Minsk. They took part in a massive march carrying banners claiming that 16,000 workers were supporting this protest. According to the Independent, "a group of soldiers guarding the building lowered their shields, appearing to side with the protesters".

There were multiple instances of police expressing support for and even embracing protesters.

Sviatlana Tsikhanouskaya asked Belarusian authorities to stop the violence, "engage in dialogue", and call on mayors to organize peaceful rallies across the country over the weekend.

On 15 August, post-election protests continued to grow. For the first time, government-supported television demonstrated episodes of what was happening on the streets without any censorship. They streamed a farewell ceremony for the murdered during a peaceful protest on 10 August. The Associated Press released a video showing the moment when Alexander Taraikovsky was killed.

It was reported that Lukashenko's authorities asked Kremlin representatives about the possibility of Lukashenko escaping to Russia. Furthermore, it was reported that Russia admitted that Lukashenko's resignation as the head of state was likely. The editor-in-chief of the anti-government website Charter 97 claimed that Russian troops were concentrated along the Belarus-Russia border in preparation for a potential invasion, possibly within the next 48 hours. It was also reported that Lukashenko spoke to President Putin with both sides expressing confidence that all existing problems would be settled soon; the possibility of foreign mediation was firmly rejected by Lukashenko.

Peaceful demonstrations took place in several cities, including Moscow, where 400 mainly wearing white formed a chain near the Belarusian Embassy in support of the protesters.

Some protesters in Minsk expressed solidarity with the anti-government Khabarovsk Krai protests in the Russian Far East.

On 16 August, Lukashenko's supporters were bussed into Minsk from various places across the country for a pro-Lukashenko rally, which had a much smaller turnout than the opposition demonstrations, which were the largest yet. The Belarusian Interior Ministry claimed a turnout of 65,000 at the pro-Lukashenko rally. A Reuters reporter estimated a turnout of 5,000. In a speech to supporters, Lukashenko said he would not step down, claimed that NATO was amassing "military power on the western borders", and warned supporters not to test him or they would be "beggars and struggle to live". Lukashenko also rejected calls for new elections. NATO rejected Lukashenko's claims. Right before the speech, Lukashenko called Russian President Putin for the second time in two days.

Opposition groups called for a "National March for Freedom" in Minsk and similar marches to occur in cities and towns across the country. Supporters were asked to converge on government buildings and call for the immediate release of all political prisoners, for those responsible for the deaths and torture of protesters to be brought to justice and for the resignation of Alexander Lukashenko. Organizers estimated that 100,000–220,000 people attended the Minsk demonstration. Many were carrying red and white flags. The Belarusian press reported that persons in civilian clothes made arbitrary detentions of opposition supporters after the Minsk rally. Later that evening, it was reported that former Prime Minister of Belarus, Syarhey Rumas, who was dismissed by Lukashenko in June 2020, had posted a message of support for the anti-Lukashenko protesters on his Instagram account. Earlier, Rumas's wife had published a photograph of herself and Rumas on the roof of a building overlooking the protests and a message of support.

Lukashenko had announced that an air assault brigade would hold week-long unscheduled maneuvers starting 17 August in western Belarus, before announcing that NATO forces were "at the gates" and threatening the country, prompting President Putin to offer military assistance, opening a possibility of Belarus being taken over through annexation or as a "union state". In the early morning of 17 August, several military trucks carrying unmarked soldiers were spotted heading towards Minsk on the M1 "Belarus" highway in Russia.

On 17 August, Lukashenko was booed and shouted at when he gave a speech at the Minsk wheel tractor plant. He told the audience they would have to kill him to get another election. Meanwhile, a broadcast by the state TV showed empty news desks as TV presenters had walked out on strike. Members of the European Parliament issued a joint statement stating that they did not recognize Alexander Lukashenko as the president of Belarus and considered him a persona non grata in the European Union. The joint statement also proclaimed that reliable information showed that Sviatlana Tsikhanouskaya won the presidential election.

On the same day, Tsikhanouskaya released a video in which she stated that she was ready to lead a transitional government and organize a new, free, and fair presidential election. Lukashenko conceded that an early presidential election could be held if a new constitution is adopted, after it has been drafted and a referendum is held and passed.

Pavel Latushko, director of the Yanka Kupala National Theatre in Minsk and minister of culture, who had previously condemned the violence and cautiously supported the protests, was fired by the Belarusian Ministry of Culture.

Miners of the Belaruskali potash company in Salihorsk went on strike, refusing to go down the mines, leading to BMZ Steel Works in Zhlobin suspending work of the steel furnaces. BMZ workers announced an indefinite strike if their requirements were not met. Thousands of workers of Minsk Tractor Works (MTZ), Minsk Automobile Works (MAZ), Minsk Motor Works (MMZ; ru), Minsk electrotechnical factory (METZ; ru) and other factories marched through the city to the headquarters of the largest state TV company and other locations. BelAZ workers in Zhodzina were intimidated by the company management, and their protest rally was postponed. A number of other factories suspended work temporarily in a warning strike or organized rallies with political demands (including the Naftan oil refinery and "Polimir" chemical factory in Navapolatsk, the glass fiber factory in Polatsk, and the Hrodna Azot fertilizer factory).

It was reported that 76 people disappeared during the protests in Belarus as of 17 August, because they are not on the list of arrested and convicted. Igor Leshchenya, the Belarusian ambassador to Slovakia who sided with the protesters and the first official to do so, said that he does not think there is a threat of Russian military intervention, stating that it was in the interests of Russia "to support new free and fair elections". He also said that a new election was inevitable.

On 18 August, it was reported that international companies in retail, banking, mobile, and food sectors had started pulling their advertising campaigns from Belarusian TV channels, including the state TV. German Chancellor Angela Merkel spoke to Vladimir Putin, saying that the Belarusian government must avoid using force against peaceful protesters, immediately release political prisoners and start a national dialogue. In response, Putin warned Merkel that foreign interference in the country would be unacceptable. The troupe of the Yanka Kupala National Theater in Minsk resigned en-masse.

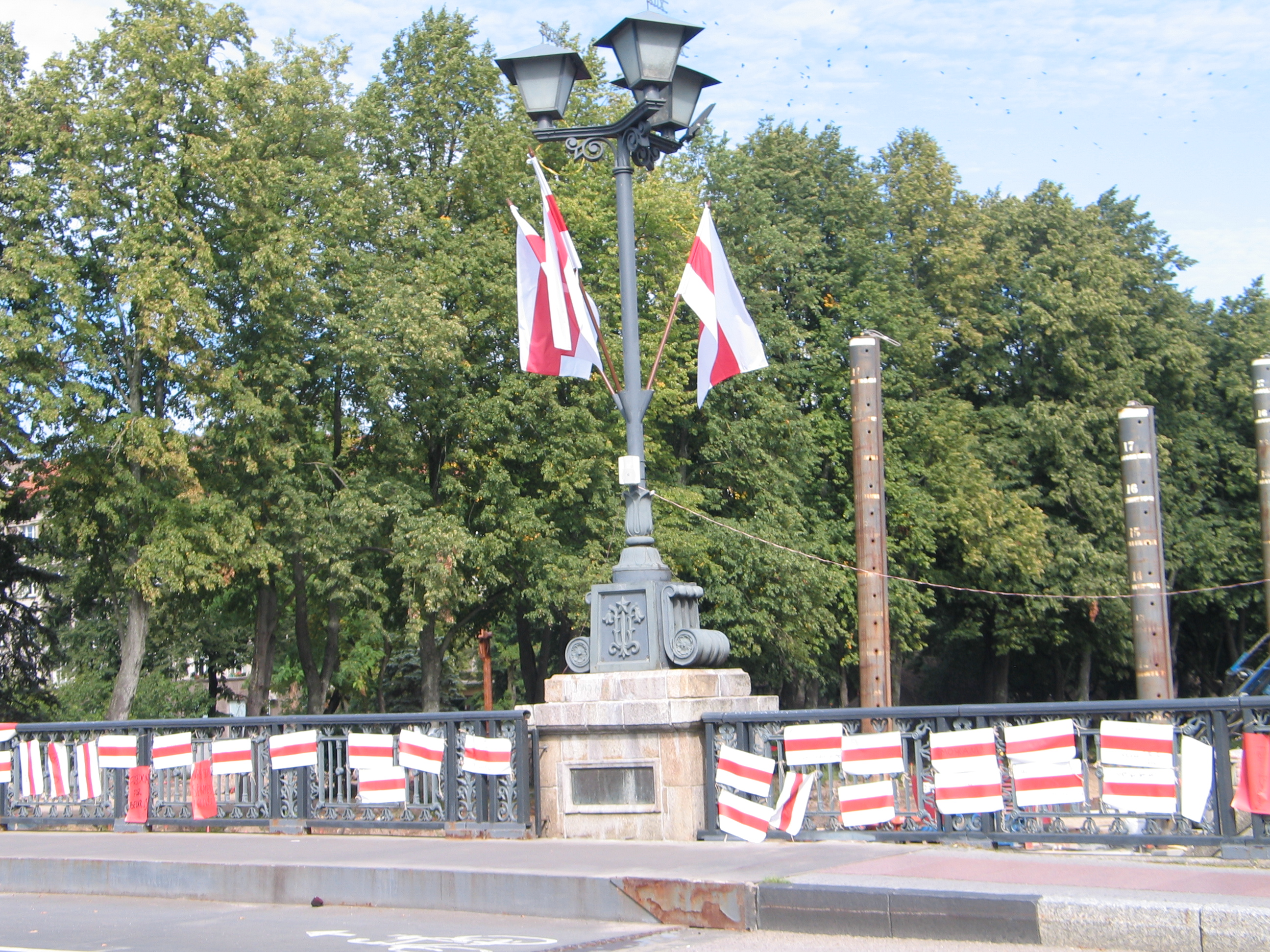
The white-red-white flags on Biržos bridge in Klaipėda, Lithuania

Workers from various additional factories and postal workers joined the strikes and the Komsomolskaya Pravda v Belarusi newspaper said it was unable to print its Tuesday edition focusing on protests over the weekend, before announcing it had secured another publisher that would produce its print edition a day late.

The Belarusian Telegraph Agency issued a misleading video purporting to show Belarusian protesters being violent. Pictures from Belarus were mixed with pictures from the 2019 protests in Catalonia. Demonstrations supporting Lukashenko took place in Mahiliou, Homel, and Khotsimsk. During the pro-Lukashenko rally in Mahiliou, a helicopter flew over the attendees with the state flag, while another state flag was taken off the local government building where it was hung. In Mahiliou, one of the activists marching near the executive committee building was deliberately injured by a hit-and-run driver. In a statement made on 18 August 2020, Prime Minister Roman Golovchenko stated that, "to date, all enterprises in the real sector of the economy are operating normally, conveyors are not stopped anywhere."

On 19 August, the OMON forces dispersed the protesters that had gathered in the morning at the entrance to Minsk Tractor Works; two people were detained. 300 employees at the Minsk Tractor Works reportedly lost their jobs for demonstrating. Other workers were locked in the factory to stop them from walking out. The same day, Alexei Petkevich, endoscopist and employee of the Republican Clinical Medical center in Minsk, announced that on 14 August, he resigned his job in protest of the mass beatings of the detained protesters, stating, "I was shocked by what I saw. Our people were humiliated and torn to pieces". Natalya Volvacheva, the headmaster of Polatsk school No. 5, also resigned in protest, saying, "My colleagues have been broken down by threats, turned into criminals, and made hostages of the system". Lukashenko appointed a new government, of which Roman Golovchenko remained prime minister, amid the protests.

Over 200 Belarusian employees of the sports sphere (Yelena Leuchanka, Mikalai Kazeka, Volha Mazuronak, Maryna Arzamasava, Aliaksandra Ramanouskaya, Stepan Popov, and many others) signed an open letter to Alexander Lukashenko, where, among other things, demanded that the last presidential election be invalidated, all the persons detained during the protests be released, all the political prisoners be released and rehabilitated, and those responsible for the beatings and "bestial abuses" of the detainees be identified and punished. Human Rights Watch noted that most of the protests had been peaceful and described the police round-ups as "systemically brutal." The Belarusian central election committee said that Lukashenko would be inaugurated as president for a new term within the next two months. Lukashenko ordered the police to quell all protests in Minsk and tightened border controls, introduced checks on people entering the TV station, and told all state workers they would lose their jobs if they protested, with workers reportedly being brought in from Russia to replace striking workers. Two pro-Lukashenko rallies were held in Barysaw and Babruisk, both of which also featured police helicopters with the state flag. A third pro-Lukashenko rally was held in Minsk. Others were held in the towns of Luninets and Staryya Darohi.

Most of the staff of Radio Stalitsa of the state-owned National State Television and Radio Company of the Republic of Belarus resigned in solidarity with the demonstrators. There currently are no broadcasts on the station except for sports news. A demonstration of hundreds chanting "resign" and "let them out" in the evening outside the Interior Ministry in Minsk was allowed to continue peacefully with no police interference.

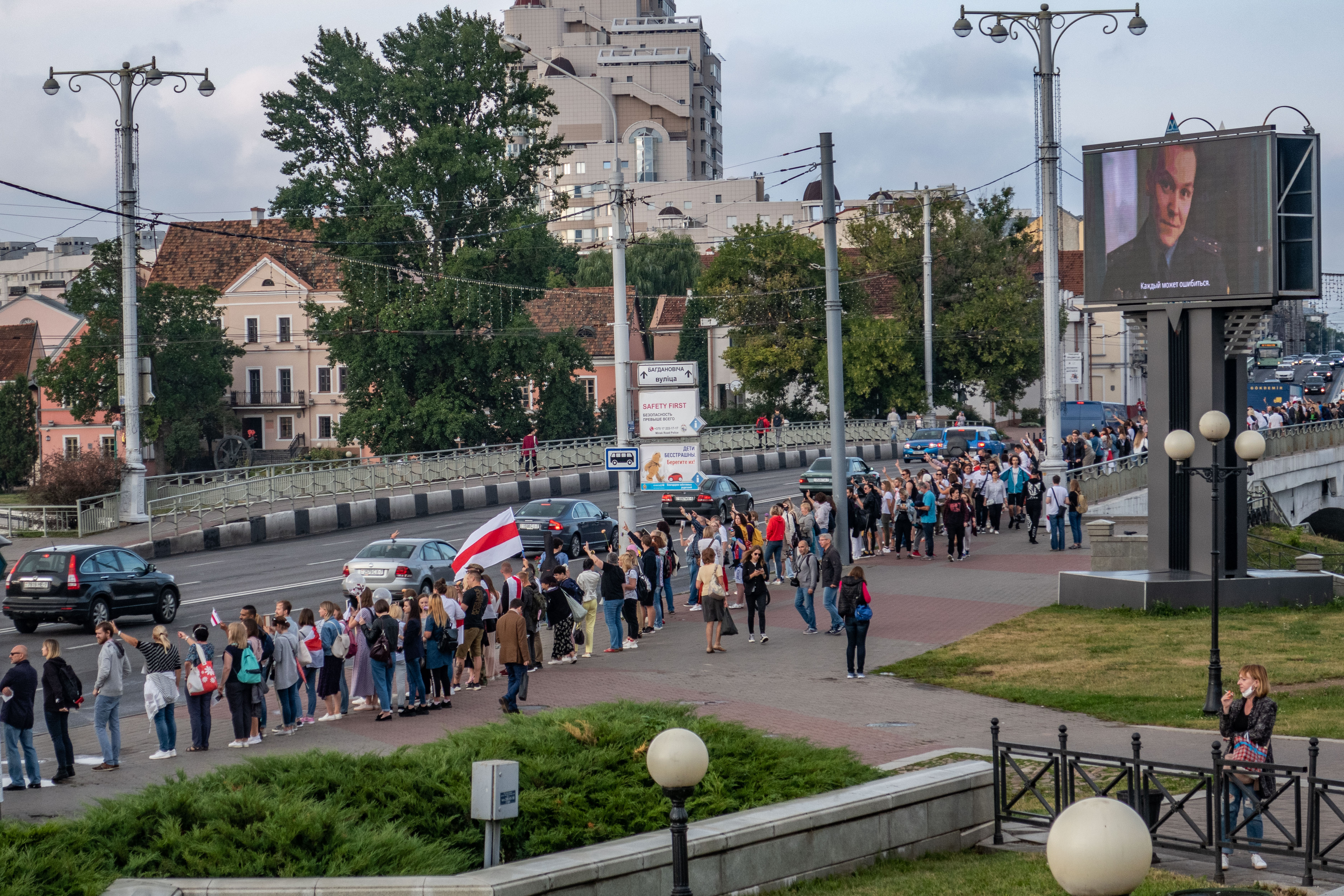
Line of protest against violence ("Never again") from Kurapaty memorial to Akrestsina detention center, Minsk, 21 August

On 20 August, Alexander Konyuk, Prosecutor General of Belarus, initiated criminal proceedings against the members of the Coordination Council under Article 361 of the Belarusian Criminal Code, on the grounds of attempting to seize state power and harming national security. Council members Sergei Dylevsky and Maxim Znak were summoned for police questioning. Four members of the security forces resigned in solidarity with the demonstrators. Lukashenko has called some of the protesters "Nazis". Another pro-Lukashenko rally was held in Minsk at Independence Square, with another helicopter bearing a state flag flying over the demonstrators. At the same time, a separate rally was held at the Lenin monument in front of the Government House in Minsk, only to be outnumbered by anti-Lukashenko demonstrators. In response, some pro-Lukashenko demonstrators joined the opposition protest, while others left the rally. Traffic in Minsk was halted by a drivers' strike, honking their horns and abandoning their vehicles in support of protesters. A small group of Lukashenko supporters were seen in Hrodna handing out state flags and other pro-government material to passersby. A pro-government rally was held at a stadium in Slutsk, after which rally attendees approached a solidarity chain formed by opponents of Lukashenko and attempted to snatch Belarusian opposition flags from the protesters.

On 21 August, presidential candidate Hanna Kanapatskaya filed an appeal against the official election result with the Supreme Court of Belarus. French President Emmanuel Macron and Angela Merkel, Chancellor of Germany offered to mediate between the Government of Belarus, the opposition, and civil society. Sviatlana Tsikhanouskaya held a press conference for the international media in which she said she hoped to return to Belarus when it was safe for her to do so. She urged all countries to respect their sovereignty and called on protesters to step up their strikes despite "intimidation". Chair of the Belarus Athletic Federation, Olympic athlete and former member of the House of Representatives, Vadim Devyatovskiy, posted a message on his Facebook page in which he said "Lukashenko is not my President!!!!!" and stated that his previous support for the regime was a "delusion" and "betrayal". The leader of the strike at Minsk automobile plant, Yevgeny Bokhvalov, had been arrested whilst an organizer of the strike at the Belaruskali potash factory in Salihorsk, Dmitry Kudelevich, was detained before escaping through a toilet window and fleeing to Ukraine. The Prime Minister of Albania Edi Rama, chairperson of the Organization for Security and Co-operation in Europe (OSCE), said representatives of the group were heading to Minsk to meet with the government and the opposition to look at mediation. A pro-government rally was held in Homel where tractors could be seen with the state flags. A small number of cars could also be seen waving the state flag by Independence Square in Minsk.

On 22 August, the Chairman of the Hrodna Region Executive Committee, Vladimir Kravtsov, was dismissed by Lukashenko and replaced by former health minister Vladimir Karanik. Lukashenko appeared at a pro-government rally in Hrodna later that afternoon. During the rally, Lukashenko called on the military to defend the western border of Belarus, accusing Warsaw and Vilnius of being behind the protests. Lukashenko warned that "this is not only our border, this is the border of the Union State, this is the CSTO border, and the response will be appropriate." He also defended his handling of the COVID-19 pandemic, saying "You didn't believe me when I said, 'You don't need to isolate people.' What are Westerners saying now?" Lukashenko called out striking workers from the state-owned Hrodnazhylbud construction company, saying "We will do even without Hrodnazhylbud, we have enough builders in the country", and also called out priests participating in the protests, quoting that "People should come to the temples to pray. Churches...are not for politics." Several journalists were detained at the rally. Opposition supporters organized a woman's march against police violence in Minsk which culminated in a vigil at Independence Square where the assembled crowd was addressed by Maria Kalesnikava and Pavel Latushko. Opposition rallies were also held in Hrodna and Brest.

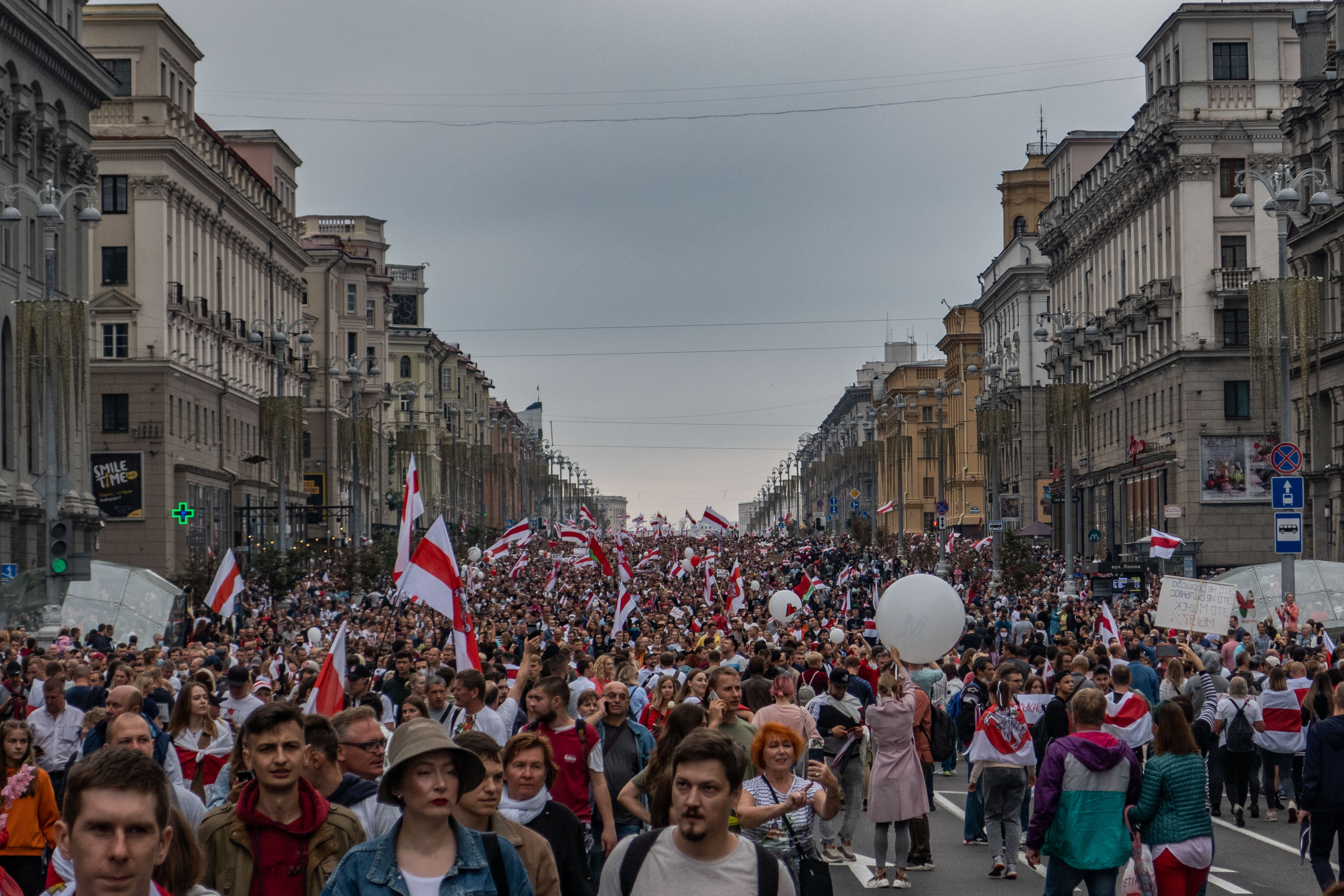
Rally against Lukashenko. Minsk, 23 August

On 23 August, a rally of approximately 250,000 people dubbed "the march for a new Belarus" began at 14:00 in Minsk and headed towards Independence Square. Similar rallies were also organized in other cities and towns across the country. Human chains in solidarity with the Belarusian democracy movement were organized in other countries, including one that stretched from Vilnius to the border with Belarus. Military vehicles were seen on the streets of Minsk and roadblocks and checkpoints were established on the main roads leading into the city. The army also assumed responsibility for the protection of statues and monuments from local police forces. The area around the Belarusian Great Patriotic War Museum, where protesters had gathered the previous week, was blocked off with barbed wire. It was reported that people were detained by armed officers in military uniform near the museum. The rally later passed the museum where Maria Kalesnikava urged participants to not antagonize security personnel.

External image
- Government troopers near residence of Lukashenko in Minsk, 23 August

Lukashenko with a gun arrived by helicopter in the Palace of Independence

Later in the afternoon, the rally moved onward toward State Flag Square and the Independence Palace where protesters faced off against security forces who had set up a roadblock. It was reported that Alexander Lukashenko was in residence at the palace. There were also reports that a presidential helicopter was seen heading towards the palace and that it had landed in the grounds at 19:05. Footage later emerged showing Lukashenko walking near the helicopter, wearing a bullet proof vest and holding an AKS-74U without a magazine and then walking around the palace grounds. In the latter footage, Lukashenko was heard saying "Leave me alone," and "There is no one left there, right?". His 15-year-old son, Nikolai, was seen with him dressed in military uniform and holding a gun. In a third video, he is seen surveying protesters from a helicopter and is heard saying "How the rats ran away" in an apparent reference to the protesters. In a fourth video, Lukashenko was seen removing the former flag of Belarus from a flower bed, waving at security personnel whilst telling them they were "handsome" and referred to protesters, saying "we will deal with them". Large groups of security personnel were later seen heading towards the center of Minsk and military helicopters were seen flying over parts of the city. Authorities asked mobile operators to restrict 3G access to parts of Minsk at around 18:30 local time. The presidential helicopter was seen leaving the palace at about 20:47 and it was unknown if Lukashenko was on board or not. The official representative of the Ministry of Internal Affairs claimed that 30,000 people attended pro-government demonstrations in the past day, against 6,100 attending anti-government demonstrations.

On 24 August, presidium members of the Coordination Council, Sergei Dylevsky and Olga Kovalkova were detained by security services when attempting to support striking workers at the Minsk Tractor Works factory. Three other presidium members, Svetlana Alexievich, Liliya Vlasova and Pavel Latushko, were also summoned for questioning. Police appeared to be less tolerant of protests, rallies and strikes, actively breaking up lines of solidarity in Minsk and arresting leaders of strikes at state-owned enterprises. Despite increased police presence, groups of protesters were still able to gather in Independence Square in Minsk, where they shouted "Leave!", and also in Hrodna and in Brest. Alexander Lukashenko issued a statement in which he threatened dismissal for school teachers who do not follow "state ideology". An employee of the Ministry of Foreign Affairs was fired after he had attended an anti-Lukashenko rally the previous week with another Ministry employee. The Government of Lithuania handed a note of protest to the Belarusian ambassador in Vilnius accusing the Belarusian armed forces of violating Lithuanian airspace by as much as 3 km the previous day. Belarus claimed that its air force was attempting to prevent balloons depicting the former white-red-white flag of Belarus, which was described as an "anti-state symbol", from crossing the border.

25 August marked the 29th anniversary of the declaration of independence of Belarus from the Soviet Union and the re-adoption of the white-red-white flag. Olga Kovalkova appeared in court via video link on charges of illegally organizing a strike and Pavel Latushko presented himself to the KGB for questioning. Both Kovalkova and Sergei Dylevsky were sentenced to 10 days imprisonment. A group of teachers organized a protest outside the headquarters of the education ministry in Minsk in relation to possible dismissals for teachers who supported opposition protests or refused to promote state ideology. In the early evening, a rally was held in Independence Square in Minsk, which was addressed by some of the members of the Supreme Council session that declared Belarus an independent state in 1991. A pro-Lukashenko demonstration, dubbed "Belarus is Lukashenko", was also held in Minsk. During the demonstration, anti-Lukashenko protesters were described as "Satanists" and told to "go to Hell", some participants mocked journalists covering the event and waved Russian flags. An employee of the Belarusian embassy in India was fired after declaring his support for the protests.

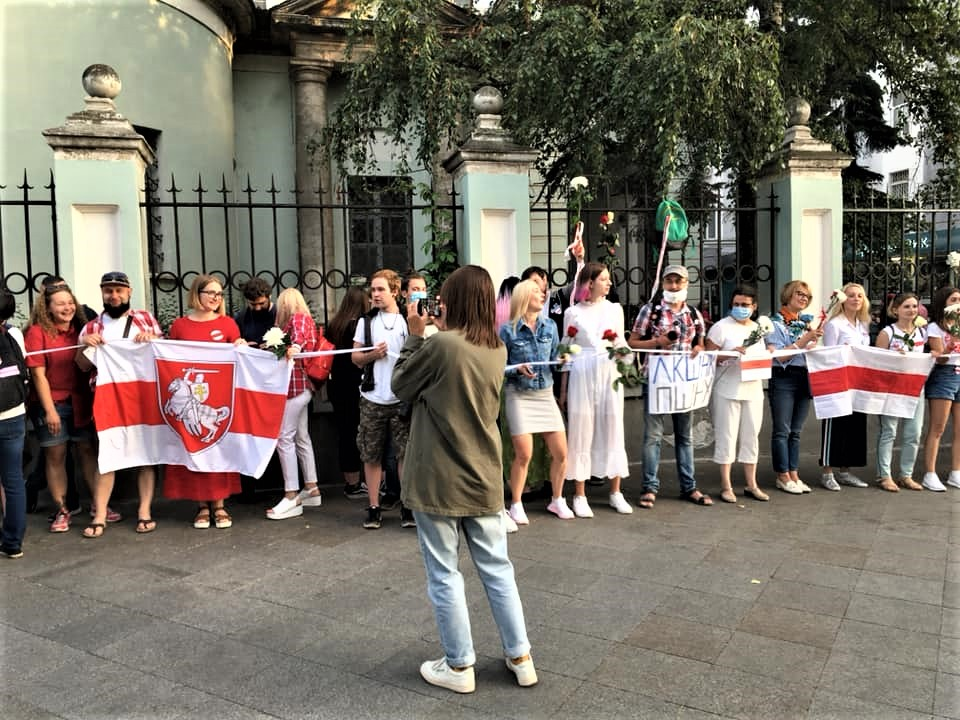
Demonstration against Lukashenko in front of the Belarus Embassy in Moscow, Russia, 23 August

On 26 August, residents began recall proceedings against at least 20 members of the House of Representatives. Coordination Council member and Nobel Prize laureate Svetlana Alexievich was summoned for interrogation but refused to answer any questions and was subsequently released. The home of opposition figure Valery Tsepkalo was raided by police. A group of about 500 employees of BelAZ marched from their place of work to the center of Zhodzina. By late evening, a group of anti-Lukashenko demonstrators had gathered on Independence Square in Minsk. At around 20:30, security forces began to disperse the crowd, encircling demonstrators and detaining several people. At the same time, mobile internet was turned off in Minsk at the request of the authorities. Security forces locked the doors of the Saints Simon and Helena Roman Catholic church trapping around 100 people inside. The Catholic Auxiliary Bishop of Minsk-Mahiliou, Yury Kasabutsky, protested against the actions of the security forces, calling them illegal.

On 27 August, Alexander Lukashenko asked the Russian government to raise a reserve force for deployment to Belarus if necessary. The Government of Belarus declined an offer from the heads of the governments of Estonia, Latvia and Lithuania to visit Minsk to help mediate between the government and the opposition. In the afternoon, around 20 journalists, from both local and international media, were detained on Freedom Square in Minsk. They were taken to the Kastrychnitski district police, supposedly to check their identity and accreditation. Later that day, a group of Christians carrying Bibles had gathered outside the Saints Simon and Helena Roman Catholic Church on Independence Square, Minsk in protest of the desecration of the church by the security services that had occurred the previous day. The entrance to the church was blocked by security forces to prevent people from entering or leaving the church. A crowd of demonstrators later formed on Independence Square outside the church which was surrounded by the security forces. Women and children were allowed to leave the square but men were prevented from doing so. At least 150 people were detained. Many of the people who were dispersed from the demonstration on Independence Square continued to march through the city, singing religious songs and chanting anti-government slogans. A pro-Lukashenko rally was held in front of the Belarus supermarket in Minsk, but it was ended abruptly by rain.

On 28 August, anti-Lukashenko demonstrators again gathered on Independence Square in Minsk. The demonstration was broken up by security forces, which had encircled the square. Male demonstrators were rounded up and placed into police vans and taken away for questioning. Female demonstrators were allowed to leave the square. Security forces broke up an anti-Lukashenko rally on Pushkin Street in Minsk. Access to several anti-government websites was blocked. A pro-Lukashenko bike ride was held in Minsk led by Alexander Lukashenko's son Viktor Lukashenko.

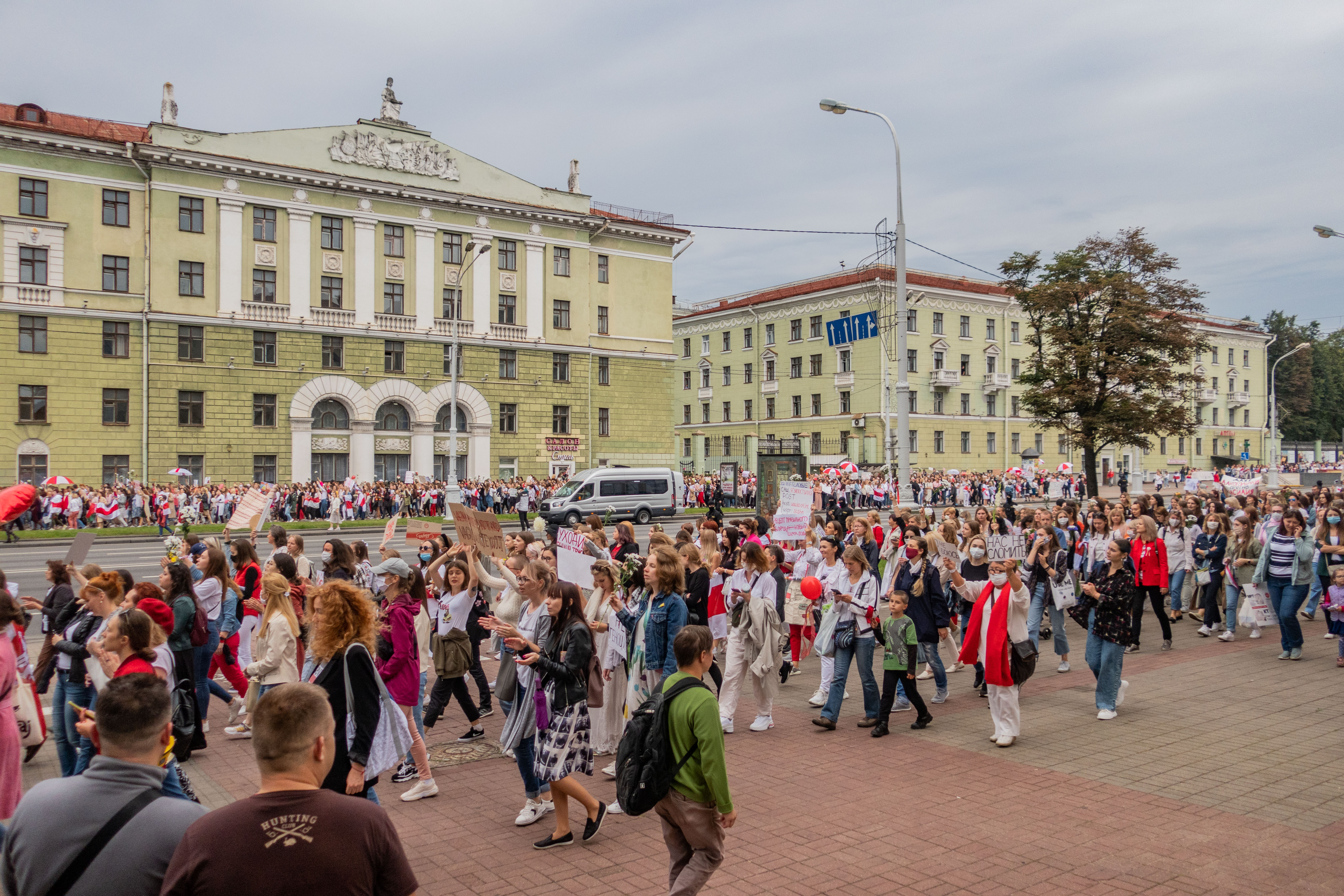
"Women's march" against Lukashenko. Minsk, 29 August

On 29 August, a pro-government rally and an anti-government bikers rally took place in Minsk. Barriers were installed around the Independence Palace, Victory Square and October Square in Minsk and buses with their windows blacked out were seen around Freedom Square in the city. Unidentified vehicles with Russian number plates were seen driving around Minsk. A woman's solidarity march, numbering approximately five thousand people, began on Independence Avenue at 16:00 and headed towards Independence Square. Riot police attempted to block its progress, but the march was able to pass. By 19:00, the rally had grown at approximately fifteen thousand people and was heading towards Bangalore Square, again overpowering security forces that tried to block its progress. At least two journalists from Radio Free Europe/Radio Liberty and one journalist from TUT.BY were detained at this rally. An anti-Lukashenko demonstration was also held in Brest. Solidarity demonstrations took place in Jerusalem and in Frankfurt.

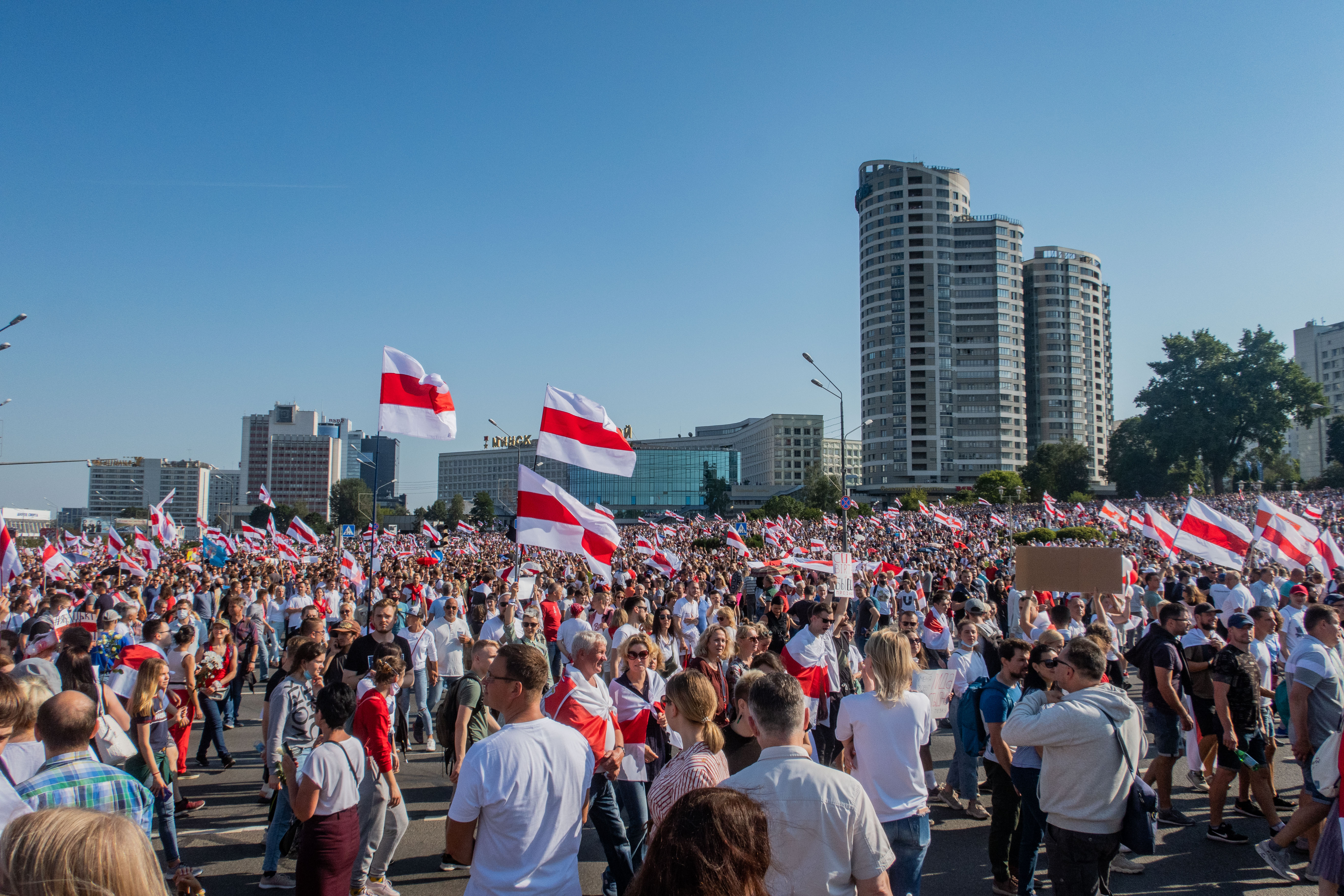
Rally against Lukashenko. Minsk, 30 August

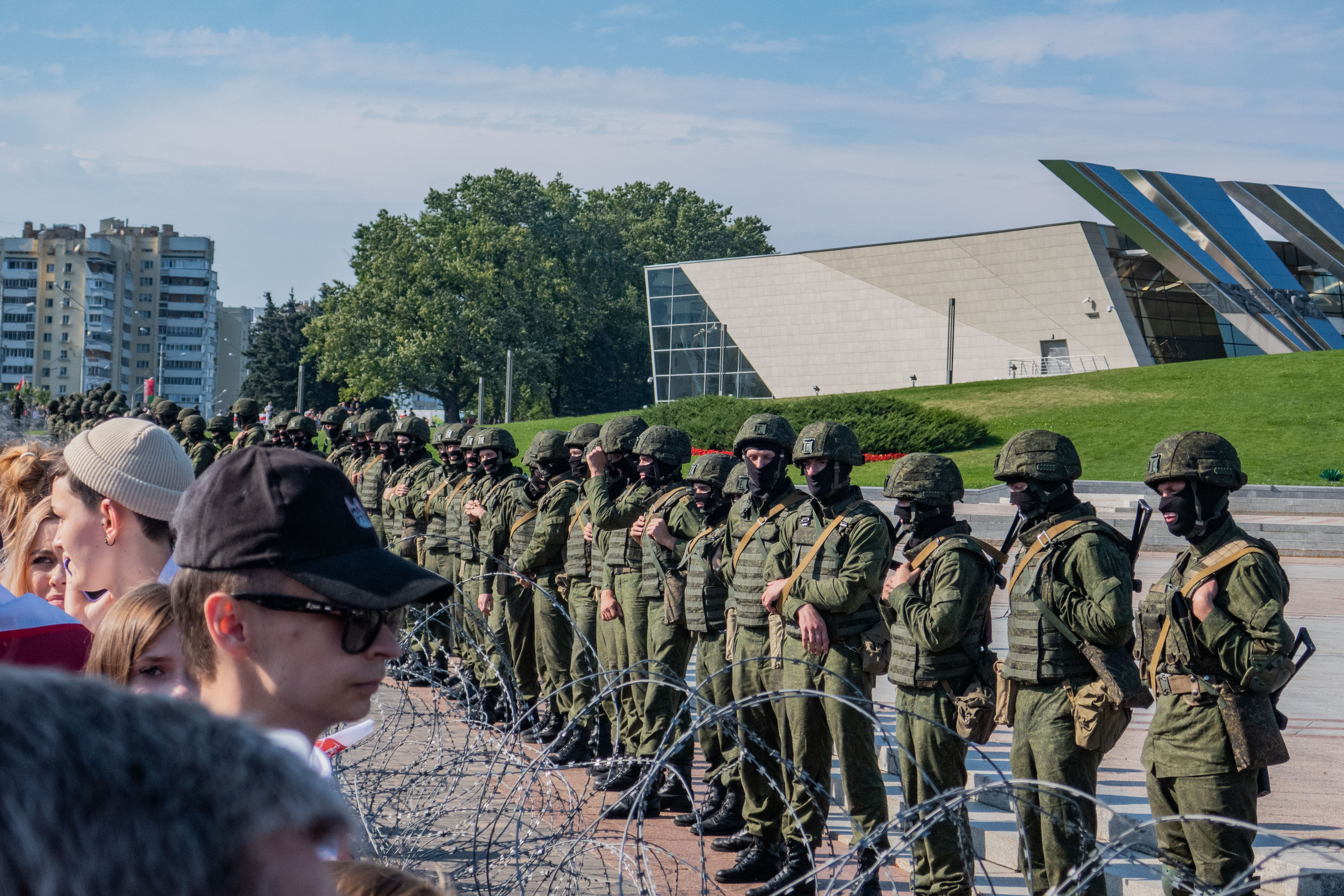
Soldiers behind barbed wire. Minsk, 30 August

30 August marked Alexander Lukashenko's 66th birthday and a program of national celebrations had been planned by the government, public authorities and his supporters. Russian President Vladimir Putin called Lukashenko to offer birthday greetings and the two agreed to meet in Moscow in the coming weeks. Independent media sources reported a large buildup of military vehicles and security personnel around Minsk with access to public squares being fenced off and roads being blocked. Lukashenko's opponents had planned a series of events and rallies culminating in a "March for Peace and Independence" which was to proceed down Independence Avenue to Independence Square and then onward to the Independence Palace. Similar rallies were also planned to take place in regional capitals where opponents were asked to gather at regional administrative headquarters. Opponents of Lukashenko were asked to bring appropriate birthday gifts and to leave these at Lukashenko's official residences around the country. Responding to this call, a group of women dressed in traditional costumes brought pumpkins to the government house, a sign of rejection in Belarusian culture. At around 14:00, local time, reports emerged of security forces arbitrarily detaining people and placing them into police vans. At approximately 14:50 it was reported that demonstrators had managed to breach a police line across the Independence Avenue, forcing security forces to retreat further down the street. Rumors began to circulate on the Telegram platform that internet access would be stopped across Minsk at 15:00. At about 15:30, the main rally had reached the Great Patriotic War Museum which was guarded by security forces. The rally continued to move towards State Flag Square and the Independence Palace where security forces had set up a roadblock. At 16:30, there were reports of "tanks" moving through the streets of Minsk (which later turned out to be several BTR-80 military vehicles). Shortly before 17:00, three members of the presidium of the Coordination Council and several Belarusian Olympic athletes had appeared at the police line in front of the Independence Palace. Security forces warned the crowd to disperse or be subject to the use of force. Rather than dispersing, the demonstrators began to place "gifts", such as cardboard cutouts of cockroaches, police vans, helicopters and white slippers for Lukashenko in front of the police line. By 19:00, most of the crowd had moved back towards the city center, partly due to a hailstorm that had broken out. Crowds continued to remain at State Flag Square, outside the Castle shopping mall and in the streets around the city center, where people continued to chant anti-Lukashenko slogans. When questioned about the whereabouts of Alexander Lukashenko, his publicity team released a photograph of him walking around the grounds of the Independence Palace holding a gun (presumably from his "standoff" a week earlier). By mid-afternoon, demonstrations were also taking place in Homel, Brest, Hrodna, Viciebsk, Mahiliou and several other towns and cities. Riot police detained a number of demonstrators in Hrodna.

On 31 August, Sviatlana Tsikhanouskaya was invited to address the United Nations Security Council. The Metropolitan Archbishop of Minsk and Mahiliou and head of the Roman Catholic Church in Belarus, Tadeusz Kondrusiewicz, was prevented from entering the country after visiting Poland, despite being a Belarusian citizen. Metropolitan Kondrusiewicz had earlier stated that he believed the presidential election had been dishonest. Coordination Council presidium member Liliya Vlasova was detained by the Department of Internal Affairs on unknown charges. The Belarusian ambassador for Spain was removed from his post after saying that the votes from the presidential election should be recounted and that "open court hearings" should proceed against police officers accused of excessive force and torture.

==== September ====
On 1 September, Knowledge Day in Belarus and Russia when most scholar institutions open, several streets in downtown Minsk were blocked by protesters, and over a thousand students from various institutions gathered on major streets rallying towards the Independence Palace. Upon being refused entry by the military, students turned around and occupied the Independence Square. Two Euroradio journalists were detained on the spot. At least 20 students were detained by early afternoon in Minsk, charged with "organizing unsanctioned protests and rallies". Only a few were released hours later. In Mahiliou and Kalinkavichy, local protest leaders were detained by riot police. In a meeting with his supporters in Baranavichy, Alexander Lukashenko explained that the catholic bishop Tadeusz Kondrusiewicz was refused entry into Belarus due to "being tasked with certain things there". He reassured the people that Belarus would hinder sanctions from Baltic countries and mentioned the closure of borders in Brest and Hrodna as a potential counteract to the sanctions.

On 2 September, the journalists detained the previous day were tried and fined in accordance with the administrative code of Belarus. That decision was met with crowds in solidarity with the journalists outside the State courthouse. The remaining three members of the Coordination Council were brought up for questioning. Over a thousand railroad workers wrote a direct address to their corporation, asking for another election to be held and Lukashenko ousted from his presidential position. Ignoring contract termination warnings, some of them also went on strike that day. A similar address came out of the Hrodna meat-processing factory, where over 800 workers signed a letter of protest directed at Lukashenko.

The Belarus State University Lyceum published a statement on their website condemning violence, injustice and electoral fraud coming from Lukashenko's government. They also urged major institutions to close and go on strike, suggesting that "they cannot arrest all of us, most of us". The Mozyr Oil Refinery director decided to close its main building after receiving a letter signed by 1,200 personnel concerned about police brutality in the region. The same address also had similar goals brought up, including re-election and Lukashenko's resignation. Sergey Lavrov, Russia's foreign minister, held a meeting with his Belarusian counterpart, Vladimir Makei, where they discussed the current situation in Belarus. Lavrov urged Ukraine to investigate the presence of 200 trained extremists currently found in Belarus and allegedly sent there by the Ukrainian government. Dmytro Kuleba, the Ukrainian foreign minister, retorted by calling this statement "a fruit of psychological delirium" and affirmed that Ukraine had no current implication in Belarusian affairs, nor a planned one, unlike the Russian government. The Catholic Synod of Eastern Europe released a statement calling the entry denial of archbishop Kondrusiewicz "unacceptable" and asked the European Human Rights Board to intervene. One of the members of Coordination Council, Pavel Latushko, who was brought for questioning in the morning, later tweeted to have left the country for Poland. He planned to visit the economic forum in Warsaw, then to fly to Vilnius to speak with the Internal Ministry of Lithuania about what to do next.

According to Mikita Mikado, a co-founder of startup IT company PandaDoc, their Minsk offices were raided and stormed by police the same day after one of the servers had been leaking inside data about protest organizations despite internet censorship by the government. In response to this, company workers formed a chain of solidarity outside the building, singing Belarusian songs. The two founders as well as two programmers were detained following these events. In downtown Minsk around 17:00, young women and men formed chains while dressed in white, bearing flowers and anti-Lukashenko posters. The crowd did not rally this time; however, they stood for two hours, then shouted "Thank you!" to nearby riot patrols for not interfering. According to the Ministry of Internal Affairs, 128 individuals were detained on 1 September, with 95 being charged with administrative misconduct, while 39 were sentenced to different terms of imprisonment.

On 3 September, at the makeshift memorial near the site of the death of Alexander Taraikovsky near the Pushkinskaya metro station, utilities, under the supervision of police officers in civilian clothes, covered the inscription "We will not forget" with salt and removed all the flowers put there by civilians the previous night. Residents of the area almost immediately began to rake, sweep and collect salt in garbage bags, ignoring the police. People were also seen bringing flowers to the memorial again. By 4:00 pm, all the salt was removed, and the area with the inscription was washed. A TUT.BY photojournalist, Vadim Zamirovsky, was detained when he returned to the memorial twice after being asked to leave by police. Sergey Dylevsky was sentenced to 15 days of imprisonment. Latvian Prime Minister Krišjānis Kariņš announced that, at a government meeting, a letter was addressed to the International Ice Hockey Federation with an appeal to move the 2021 IIHF World Championship from Belarus to another country. More than 50 employees of independent media (BelaPAN, TUT.BY, Komsomolskaya Pravda v Belarusi, Tribuna, Onliner, Euroradio, Radio Free Europe/Radio Liberty and others) came to the building of the Ministry of Internal Affairs to express solidarity with the detained colleagues. Despite their requests the Minister Yuri Karaev did not come out, and neither did his deputy. At the request of law enforcement officers, the journalists crossed the street and marched down the Haradzki Val. Soon thereafter, law enforcement officers in civilian clothes detained a TUT.BY photographer, Dmitry Brushko, taking him to the Kastrychnitski district police department.

On 4 September, the Kastrychnitski District court held trials against journalists from Komsomolskaya Pravda v Belarusi, BelaPAN and TUT.BY. All six correspondents were found guilty and sentenced to three days of imprisonment. The Belarusian Association of Journalists protested against the arrests and court indictments against journalists, putting forward demands to end the violation of the rights of journalists and the media, stop physical violence against journalists and peaceful protesters, and revise court decisions by punishing those who obstructed journalist activities. A number of MSLU students were detained after performing a song from the musical "Les Misérables" in the lobby of their educational institution. The staff of the Museum of History of Mahiliou wrote an open appeal to Belarusian executive and legislative authorities, demanding the resignation of Alexander Lukashenko and announcing their readiness to go on strike. The state TV channel ONT published a news item stating the Belarusian Electronic Warfare Directorate purportedly intercepted a conversation between Warsaw and Berlin. According to the ONT report, the poisoning of Russian opposition politician Alexei Navalny was closely connected with the ongoing events in Belarus. The alleged purpose of the poisoning, according to the ONT report, is to distract President Putin from the events in Belarus and turn his attention to internal problems in Russia. Germany denied the existence of this conversation. These claims mirror Lukashenko's statements from a day earlier, when, at a meeting with the Russian Prime Minister, Mikhail Mishustin, he said that there was no poisoning of Navalny, that it was a falsification, and that some "interesting conversation" had been sent to the Russian FSB.

On 5 September, a solidarity rally was organized by students near the "October" movie theater in Minsk. Minutes later, people in civilian clothes began to detain the protesters. Around 15:00, hundreds of women gathered near the Kamarouski marketplace for the "March For Peace" rally. They walked in a column along Vera Kharuzhaya Street and Independence Avenue towards Independence Square. At 18:00, a group of protesters marched in a circle through Niamiha Street and returned to Independence Square. The riot police's attempts at obstructing the march were unsuccessful. The end of the rally almost coincided in time with the beginning of the evening service in the Church of Saints Simon and Helena dedicated to the people who suffered at the protests on Independence Square. According to Belarusian journalists, about 10,000 people took part in the action. Four PandaDoc employees who were detained on 2 September were sentenced to two months of imprisonment. The company called this an act of revenge for supporting the police officers who had voluntarily quit the service and announced termination of its work in Belarus. The press service of the Coordination Council announced the departure of Olga Kovalkova to Poland. The Ministry of Foreign Affairs of Ukraine announced the suspension of official contacts with Belarus. According to the Belarusian Ministry of Internal Affairs, on 5 September, 91 citizens were detained for "participating in unauthorized mass events". 34 detainees were placed into custody for considerable administrative offenses, awaiting the court's decision.

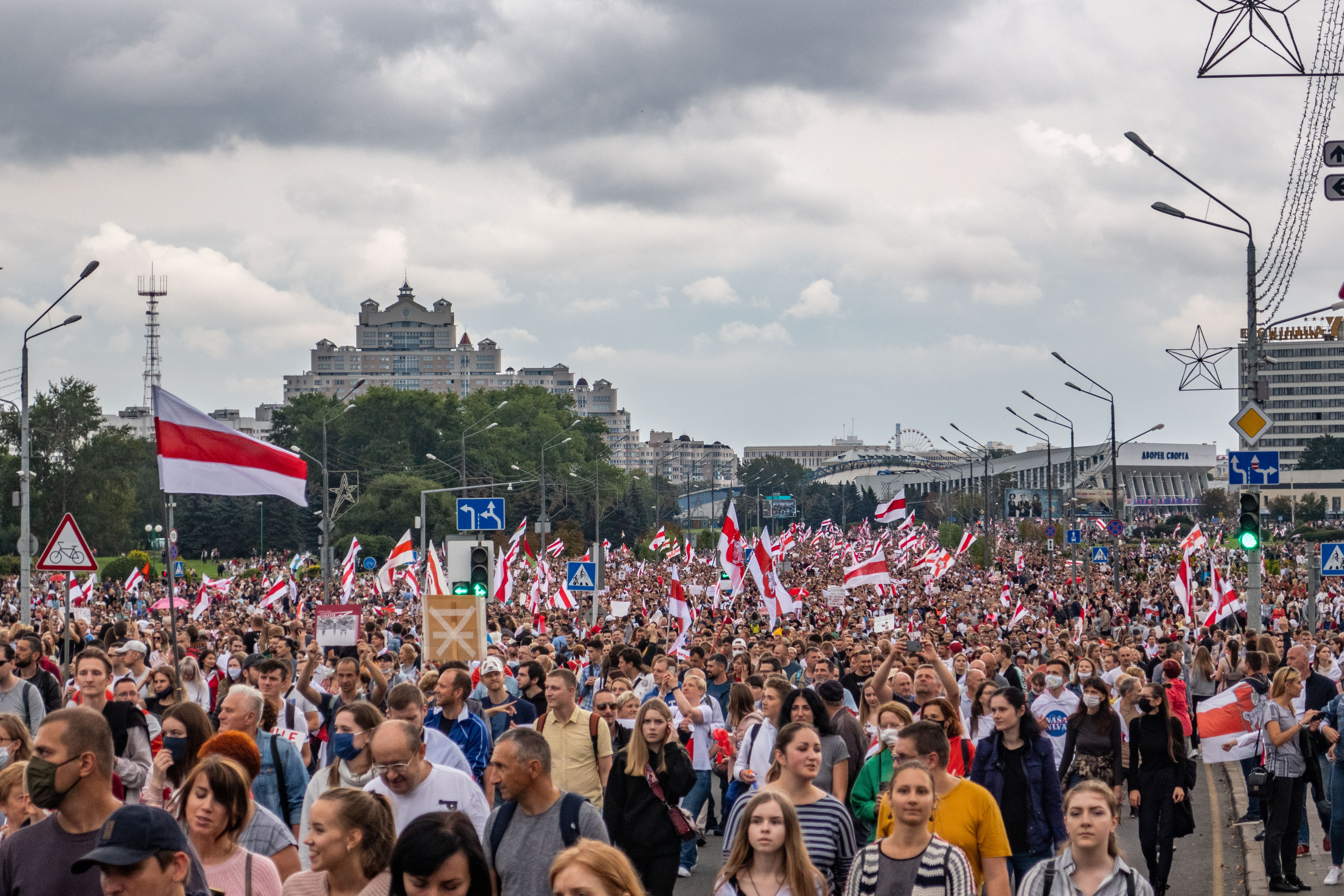
"March of Unity" near the Minsk Hero City Obelisk. Minsk, 6 September

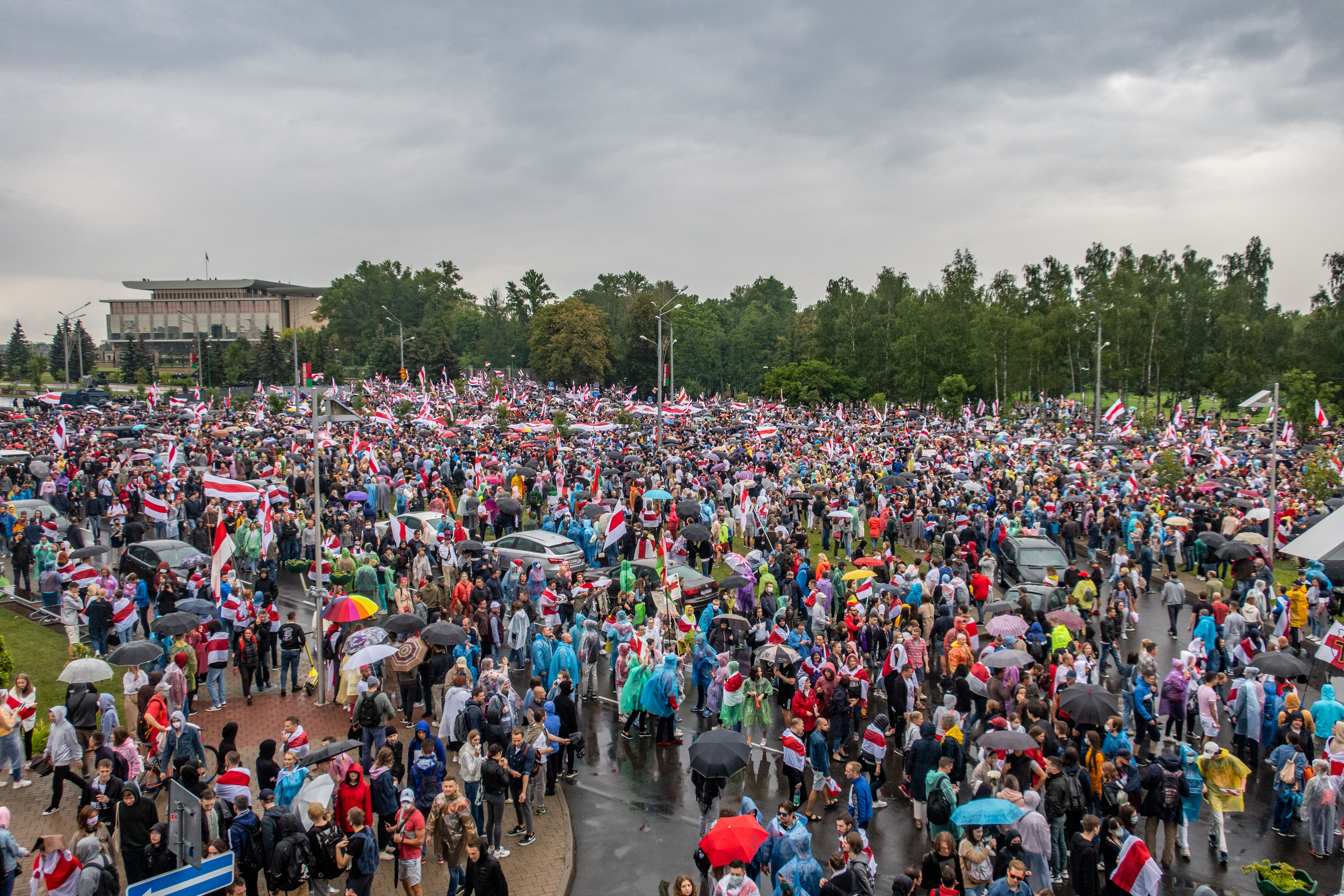
"March of Unity" near the Palace of Independence. Minsk, 6 September

On 6 September, a "March of Unity" took place in Minsk and all major regional centers. According to Nasha Niva, around 6,000 people took part in the protests in Homel, 4,000 in Hrodna, 3,000 in Brest, Viciebsk, and Mahiliou. The protest in Minsk was reported to have up to 200,000 participants. About the same number of protesters confirmed their participation on the online platform "Golos". Columns of military and special equipment (including armored personnel carriers) with UAZ trailers were unwinding barbed wire around Independence Square in Minsk. The Independence and Victory Squares were closed in advance and surrounded by metal barriers while Kastrychnitskaya Square, the area around the Hero City of Minsk monument, as well as the Palace of Independence, were occupied by water trucks wielding Rubezh anti-riot barriers. At 14:35, mobile internet of the A1 operator was disconnected. Users of other mobile operators also reported internet lockup. In the afternoon, six metro stations were closed.

Throughout the city, riot policemen attempted to disperse the columns of protesters from within residential districts to prevent protesters from reaching the center. Violent detentions with beatings were observed near the metro stations "Pushkinskaya" and "Uskhod" and near the supermarket "Rublevsky" on Chabatarou Street. However, protesters still managed to get together and march along Victors Avenue toward the Independence Palace. Once there, protesters held a demonstration for over an hour and a half, until a police warning was issued sometime after 18:00 to disperse, or be subject to detention. The remaining crowd who did not want to leave was forced into Victory Park and near Lake Kamsamolskaye by OMON. Protesters showing resistance were pulled back through the police line and put in detention vans. Women were only detained, but men were beaten, including those who did not show violence or resistance. A number of detainees were overpowered and beaten by people in civilian clothes wearing bulletproof vests and armed with batons. Their excessive aggression was purportedly overlooked by police. Fleeing detention, remaining protesters dispersed into a wooded area of the park. Some of the protesters tried to save themselves by jumping into the lake and were subsequently rescued by the local safety volunteers who transported them to the other side. A Russian blogger and journalist, Alexei Romanov, was among them at that time. He was detained and taken to Akrestsina. Two hours later, police released him, as well as other Russian citizens.

In the evening, rescuers who helped protesters out of the water were detained as well. At least eight employees of the station of the water rescue organization located on Lake Kamsamolskaye were taken to the Central District Department in Minsk. Later, one of the rescuers wound up in an ambulance with a dislocated shoulder. The other was almost unconscious. Another elderly rescuer had cardiovascular issues. According to relatives, the head of OSVOD rescue station, Denis Cheshun, was driven to Akrestsina. All the rescuers were charged with disobedience, as apparently they did not hand over people to riot police. During the protests in Minsk, several people took refuge in the O'Petit coffee shop on Niamiha Street, locking all the doors from the inside. Soon, about ten law enforcement officers in civilian clothes, including Nikolai Karpenkov, head of the Lead Department of Organized Crime Prevention, approached the café and Karpenkov personally broke a glass door with a truncheon. This was the first time in 29 days of protests when damage was done to a public property. According to the Ministry of Internal Affairs, 633 people were detained that day, with 363 detainees placed under custody awaiting trials for administrative offenses. A total of 42 protest actions were recorded in various settlements of the country, and the total number of 31,000 people participated in the protests across the country.

On 7 September, Maria Kalesnikava was abducted in Minsk: masked men kidnapped her and drove off in a van. The officials denied the accusations of abduction. The following day, it was reported by Belarusian officials that Maria Kalesnikava was detained at the border with Ukraine while trying to enter the country with two of her associates, Anton Rodnenkov and Ivan Kravtsov. In a further press-conference in Kyiv, Rodenkov and Kravtsov reported that Kalesnikava was abducted by Belarusian security forces and was forced to leave Belarus in Kravtsov's car, which she eventually avoided by tearing her passport apart and timely leaving the car through a window. Reportedly, in the aftermath, Kalesnikava was taken to a border troop installation in Mazyr. The news was met with another protest by the end of the day in Minsk. People organized a solidarity rally near Kamarouski market and about a thousand protesters marched on Vera Kharuzhaya and Kuibyshau streets. Sometime between 18:00 and 20:00 the crowd gathered on Victors Avenue, demanding a reaction to the recent events. The head of the Savetski Detention Facility came towards the crowd, who swarmed him with questions about recent detainees until he was overwhelmed and no longer able to answer. Police officers with OMON equipment quickly intervened, detaining, beating and using tear gas against the protesters. Ten unmarked police vans were spotted on the premises when the protest ended; 56 people were reported to have been detained.

On 9 September, Tsikhanouskaya recorded a video in which she addressed the Russian people, thanking them for their support and solidarity. Two members of the Belarusian opposition's Coordination Council, Maxim Znak and Illia Salei, were detained the same day. Znak was arrested in Minsk by masked men. He had previously worked as a lawyer for imprisoned Belarusian presidential candidate Viktar Babaryka. Illia Salei, also a lawyer for Belarusian presidential candidate Viktar Babaryka and opposition leader Maria Kalesnikava, was the executive secretary of the council. There were other attempts to constrain the freedom of lawyers representing Belarusian protesters in criminal and administrative proceedings. As of 9 September Maria Kalesnikava remains in police custody on Valadarskaya St, awaiting trial. Svetlana Alexievich, the last member of the council presidium not arrested or in exile, alerted the press that "men in black masks" were trying to enter her apartment in central Minsk. Diplomats from Lithuania, Poland, the Czech Republic, Romania, Slovakia and Sweden began to keep a round-the-clock watch on Alexievich's home to prevent her abduction by security services.

On 10 September, a law was passed by the Lithuanian Parliament to recognize Tsikhanouskaya as the "elected leader of the people of Belarus" and the Coordination Council as the "only legitimate representatives of the Belarusian people". The resolution also declares that Lukashenko is an "illegitimate leader". One of the miners of Belaruskali in Salihorsk, 42-year-old Yuri Korzun, protested at his workplace and refused to rise from the shaft at a depth of 305 metres (1,001 ft) in the first mine. His colleagues rose to the surface and began a rally in his support, holding a poster saying "We will not allow the regime to revive fascism". As the representative of the strike committee explained, Yuri did not leave the mine after the night, handcuffing himself as to hinder the attempts to carry him to the surface. He notified the general director of the enterprise in writing about the start of the protest, where he also said that the latter was exerting direct pressure on the staff. An emergency response plan was introduced at the mine. Later, employees of Belaruskali learned that Yuri Korzun was forcibly released and taken out of the mine, after which he was sent by ambulance to the emergency room of the Salihorsk Central Regional Hospital. Therefore, the miner's colleagues moved in a column from the mine towards the hospital.

On 11 September, the 38th birthday of Sviatlana Tsikhanouskaya, she and Olga Kovalkova recorded a joint video message for Belarusians calling to support the Coordination Council and to become its members, if possible. Detentions took place in different cities of Belarus in the morning. People began to gather near the Minsk Regional Court to support the representatives of the strike committee of Belaruskali, against which the management of the enterprise filed a lawsuit. When tikhari and unmarked security forces approached the protesters, one woman tore off the mask from one of the tikhar's face, resulting in the security forces pushing her into a minibus without license plates and identification marks. After that, at least 6 more women were detained. In Viciebsk, Dmitry Kazakevich, a journalist working for Belsat, was detained while filming. He was charged with "disrupting the order of mass activities" of the administrative code. Near the Homel Sukhoi State Technical University, a computer science teacher Vadim Belsky was detained and transported to the Savetski district department of internal affairs. Freelance journalist Andrei Tolchin was also detained in Homel while cooperating with Belsat. Students of the university came out onto the porch with solidarity banners in support of detained Belsky. Similar actions took place in BSUIR, BSU, BSUE, MSLU, GrSU, and other universities of the country. Students formed chains of solidarity and organized local marches. On Leanid Beda Street in Minsk, several people came out in support of PandaDoc, whose accounts were frozen earlier this day, leaving employees penniless. Actress Liya Akhedzhakova recorded a video message in support of the Belarusian people. "Like all my friends, I admire and, with all my heart, support those people who took to the streets of Belarusian cities", she said. During the women's solidarity rally, on Independence Square near the St. Helena Church several women were detained. In the microdistrict Shabany, a chain of solidarity was dispersed, and at least 10 people were detained. According to U.S. First Deputy Secretary of State Stephen Bigan, America does not recognize Lukashenko's legitimacy as president since it conflicts with the Helsinki Final Act and the Universal Declaration of Human Rights. He also spoke about the opposition's right to demand new elections through protest actions.

On 12 September, at 15:00, women's marches began throughout the country. In Minsk, it started with between 500 and 1000 people gathering on Freedom Square, including opposition figure Nina Baginskaya. After police tried to detain her, protesters shouted "Nina! Nina!" and fought over her while other activists attempted to tear off the masks of police officers. As a result of clashes, 69 people were detained in police vans (according to Viasna human rights center). Nevertheless, the women managed to rally from Freedom Square to Academy of Sciences metro station, wherein they crossed the Independence Square and soon went back towards Freedom Square. At about 5:30 pm, the protesters began to disperse with the words "See you tomorrow!". More than 10,000 women took part in the event. Part of the protesters continued their riot at the metro station "Victory Square". Girls shouted opposition slogans at the train conductors who greeted them with honks. Belsat journalists Yekaterina Andreeva and Maksim Kalitovsky, who initially covered this story, were detained later in the evening while police confiscated their equipment. Two hours later, both were put under arrest awaiting trial on Tuesday for "obstructing police duty" and transported to Akrestina prison.

On the same evening, a message appeared on the Cyber-Partizan Telegram channel, which read: "If at least one protester is detained on 13 September 2020, Belarus will forget the word 'taxes' until arrests stop and Lukashenko leaves his post". Another message addressed Lukashenko directly: "Alexander Grigorievich, we are addressing you personally: It will be very painful, first the tax system will go down, then the electricity in the country will end, then the banking system will go down ... Do you need it? You care so much about your surroundings ... no problem, we can kill the ruble and start blocking the accounts of your close friends. 13 September is the last chance to change your mind. And one more thing: tomorrow you must personally leave the Palace of Independence with a loudspeaker and apologize to the Belarusian people". The self-proclaimed guerrilla society Cyber-Partizan has already taken responsibility for hacking the websites of the Ministry of Internal Affairs, the Office of the President, Belarusian Lotteries and a number of others, while handing over to the NEXTA administrators databases of employees of the Ministry of Internal Affairs, OMON and KGB.

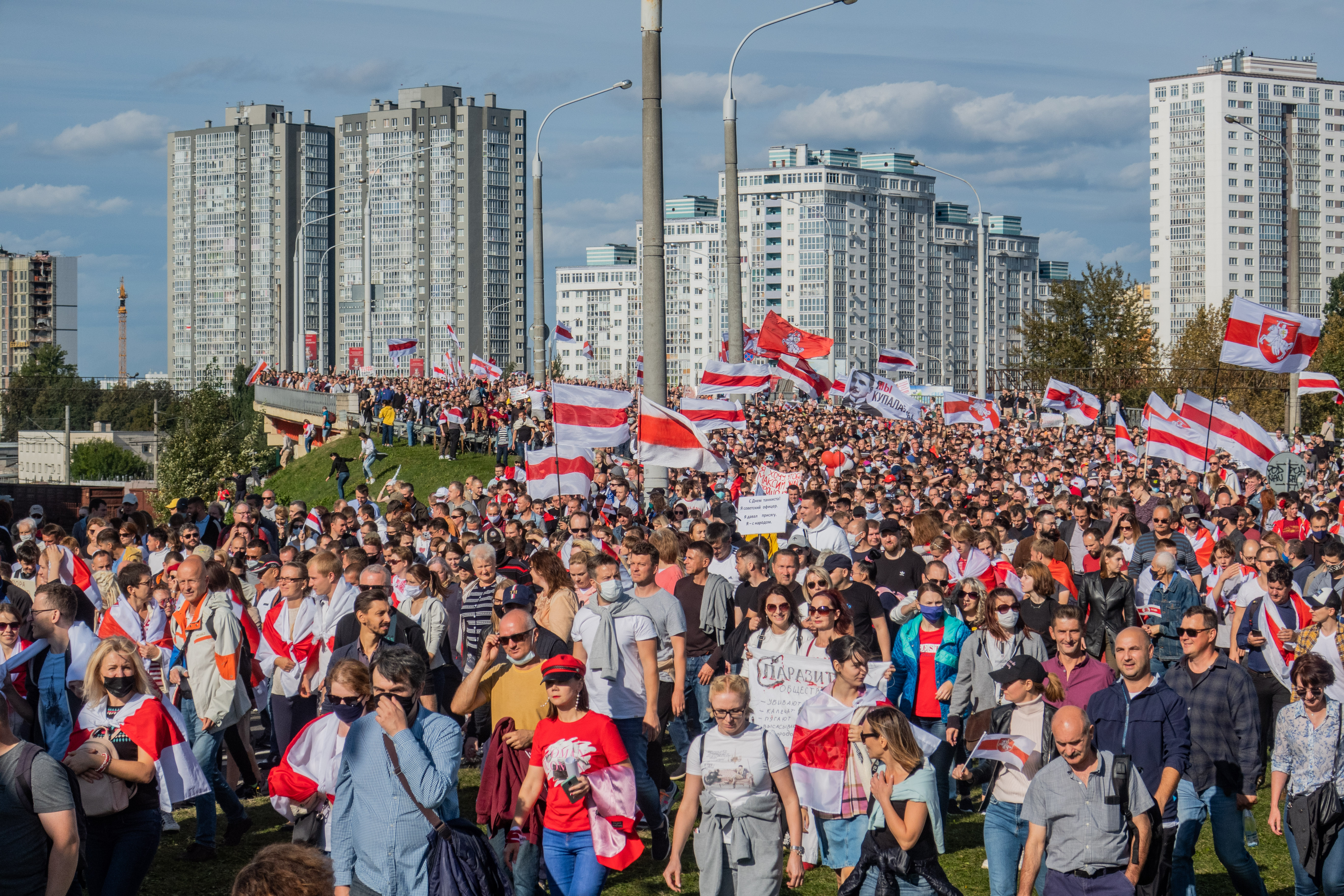
"Heroes March" in Minsk, 13 September 2020

On 13 September, the "Heroes March" rally took place in Minsk. Police presence at major city arteries was felt in the morning, aided by OMON military carriers and unmarked personnel. Any bystanders met with opposition symbols were hastily detained. A large police van accidentally ran into a passenger car and drew attention to itself. Reinforced cordons were placed at exits from metro stations, streets and lanes in the central area of the city. The first column of protesters was contained by police, who attempted once more to break crowds at their formation in residential areas. Individuals trying to break police cordons were severely beaten and then detained. Residents of Malinauka, Maskouski and other districts decided to amass at metro station "Hrushauka" in an attempt to lure police in while the initial column moved towards the center. Around Renaissance Hotel, protesters were met with another police barrier, this time followed by military personnel in carriers who issued a warning to open fire. A crowd of women came forward and stood in a chain in hopes to persuade OMON, but officers indifferently beat up protesters of both sexes. Seeing how the forces blocked off central districts of the capital, some of the protesters decided to get to the city center by public transport and thus succeeded in occupying Niamiha Street by the early afternoon. The majority of them decided to go to Independence Avenue through Zybitskaya St, but pro-government provocateurs from within the crowd gave false direction in hopes of splitting the crowd. As result, the crowd has initially split on Victors Avenue until a larger rally came from Drazdy, forcing police to use truncheons, rubber bullets and flash-bang grenades to stop them. With mass detentions being carried out at that time, some protesters tried to help detainees free themselves from police. In response, an undercover "tikhar" fired a warning shot into the air using a pump-action shotgun, making people retreat in fear. In the evening, withdrawing columns once again marched on Victors Ave through Drozdy. Some of them stood near the makeshift memorial at the site of the death of Alexander Taraikovsky until chased off by incoming police. 10 metro stations were closed on Sunday from 14:30 until 19:00. Mobile internet was shut off for about the same period of time, as usual. After 17:00, when protests started to fade, traffic police motorcyclists drove at full speed into the barbed wire ("Yegoza" engineering barriers) which was stretched at the intersection of Victors Avenue and Timiryazev Street. The wire broke and wrapped around a bystanding woman. An ambulance was called. With the help of citizens and security officials, the woman was untangled and handed over to doctors. Witness estimates round the number of Sunday protesters in Minsk up to 200,000, the same as a week earlier.

The "Heroes March" also took place in the cities of Brest, Babruisk, Viciebsk, Homel, Hrodna, Zhodzina, Kobrin, Lida, Mahiliou, Navapolatsk, Pinsk, Polatsk, and others. In many of them, harsh reactions from law enforcement officials towards the opposition was noted, including violence towards girls and women. In Brest, protesters were dispersed with a water cannon. In Zhodzina, while protesters were shouting "Police with the people!" an unknown major hit a woman in the face after she approached him closely. Another woman rushed to help the victim whom he seized and threw to the ground. In retaliation, several protesters formed a human fence around the officer refusing to let him go, until his colleague pushed people away and rescued him. In Navapolatsk, near the children's toy market, security forces made an attempt to lock the protesters in a single alley while awaiting reinforcements. However, a group of protesters launched an attack on outnumbered police who retreated into minibuses and left. According to the Internal Affairs Directorate of the Viciebsk Regional Executive Committee, seven people were detained in Polatsk and Navapolatsk during "unauthorized mass events". In Hrodna, a man in a white-red-white shirt, fleeing from the security forces, jumped into the Neman river and swam across it to escape persecution. He ended up exhausted on the other side where random passerby helped him get out of the water onto the riverbank.

On 14 September, information transpired about the number of protesters currently detained in Akrestsina Prison in Minsk. As of Saturday, 109 out of 110 bed bunks were occupied. According to the head of the facility, Yevgeny Shapetko, that number was exceeded with last Sunday's detainees, expanding the allowed sanitary and other capacities beyond those expected. Prior to Putin's and Lukashenko's meeting in Sochi, Bloomberg L.P. released an editorial based on five Kremlin sources according to whom the Russian president does not believe Belarusian protests to have any effect on the current government. In scope of further events, Putin assured the press that Moscow will do whatever it takes to keep the currently established regime in Belarus, and to prevent the opposition from assuming power. At the same time, Putin expressed concern about the number of people demanding Lukashenko's immediate resignation. The encounter of both heads of state took place at Bocharov Ruchey residence, the result of which was Russia granting Belarus a loan of US$1.5 billion. In return Lukashenko announced plans to make a statement to the CSTO and EAEU about the events in Belarus after the elections, and also promised Vladimir Putin to inform him in detail about the protests in Minsk during the talks. According to the TASS news agency, French President Emmanuel Macron also held talks with Vladimir Putin, with both leaders expressing their interest in the normalisation of the situation in Belarus.

In Minsk State Linguistic University, an access control scheme was introduced. The administration insisted that, from now on, employees of the Security Department of the Ministry of Internal Affairs will be guarding the educational institution, and that a corresponding agreement has been concluded. "In the near future, the video surveillance system will also be expanded and strengthened throughout the MSLU" the administration said. At the same time, an open video message from teachers of the Faculty of Philology of BSU appeared on the network, in which they supported students in their right to express their own opinion and freedom of choice. Students and professors of leading Belarusian universities carried out solidarity actions in response. Doctors of the Minsk 9th hospital and employees of the Academy of Sciences protested and demanded the release of their colleagues, who were detained on Sunday march. In many districts of Minsk, people lined up in chains of solidarity. Near the Red Church, security forces detained three girls who were sitting and holding blank sheets of A4 white or red paper. Sports journalist Sergei Shchurko was also detained. According to his wife, Sergei stopped communicating after 13:00, saying that police officers were going to talk to him. Later it became known that the journalist was being held on an administrative case in Akrestsina prison.

On the same day, Russo-Belarusian military exercises began at the Brestsky training ground under the codename "Slavic Brotherhood-2020". They were expected to last until 25 September. Overall, about 300 servicemen and about 70 units of military and special equipment from Russia took part in the exercise, mostly consisting of the 76th Guards Airborne Assault Division. The Russian Ministry of Defense stressed that after completion of these exercises, Russian servicemen would return home.

Amnesty International launched a petition to protect peaceful protesters in Belarus and stop police brutality against them stating, "Hundreds of thousands of Belarusian people have taken to the streets across the country to protest electoral violations, police brutality and severe reprisals against peaceful dissent; demanding truth, justice and accountability for the perpetrators. The protests are being met with brutal and indiscriminate force by police."

On 17 September, the European Parliament recognised the Coordination Council as the "interim representative of the people" of Belarus.

On 18 September, an allegedly politically motivated self-immolation attempt occurred near a police station in Smaliavichy.

On 19 September about 2,000 people, most of them women, joined Saturday's Women's march in Minsk. The Belarusian Interior Ministry said that 415 protesters were detained during the March, around 390 of them were women. The authorities claim they released 385 detainees later the same night.

The same day, Telegram channel NEXTA Live leaked the personal data of more than 1,000 Belarusian police officers in retaliation for a growing crackdown against demonstrators. The Google document contained a list of 1,003 names of officers as well as their birthdates, ranks, places of work and hometowns. Separately, NEXTA released seven entries containing personal information, including addresses and phone numbers, belonging to members of the special anti-terror unit of the interior ministry.

"If detentions continue, we will continue to publish data on a massive scale," NEXTA said, alongside the Telegram message. NEXTA Live said the information came from anonymous hackers they called "cyber partisans". "No one will remain anonymous even under a balaclava," it said.

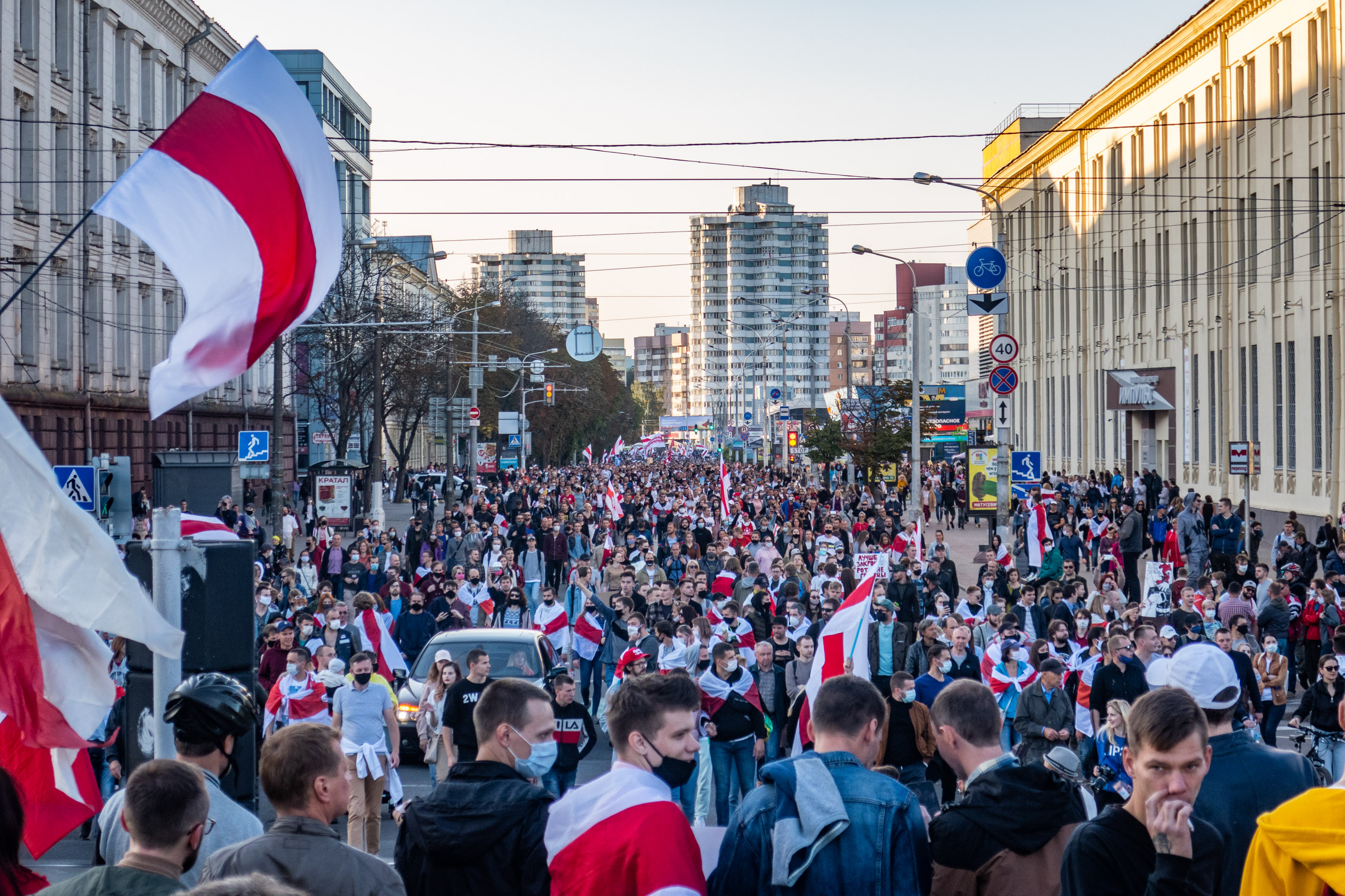
Anti-Lukashenko protest rally. Minsk, 20 September

Use of water cannon during the protest rally after the secret inauguration of Lukashenko. It was reported than an orange dye was added to the water to mark the protesters. Minsk, 23 September

On 20 September, about 100,000 people gathered in Minsk. Hundreds of soldiers blocked off the center of Minsk, deploying water cannons and armoured personnel carriers and erecting barbed wire barriers. Protests also took place in several other Belarusian cities, including Brest and Hrodna. The Belarusian Interior Ministry said that 442 people were detained for violating the law on mass events in Belarus, including 266 of them in Minsk.

On 23 September, Alexander Lukashenko was sworn in as President of Belarus for the next term in a brief, unannounced inauguration ceremony in Minsk. Several countries' Foreign Ministers have declared that they do not consider this inauguration legitimate.

Following Lukashenko's inauguration, mass opposition protests broke out in Minsk. The protesters used more confrontational tactics than before, blocking roads and chasing police vehicles away. The police deployed water cannons to disperse the protesters, with BBC stating, "the masked riot police used tactics that haven't been seen since the violent days immediately after the disputed election in August."

On 25 September, a children's show on the state-owned Belarus 3 TV network allegedly took a swipe at Lukashenko by telling the tale of a teddy bear assuming the throne, not wanting to let go of power and constantly asking for pie, and eventually losing power to a fox.

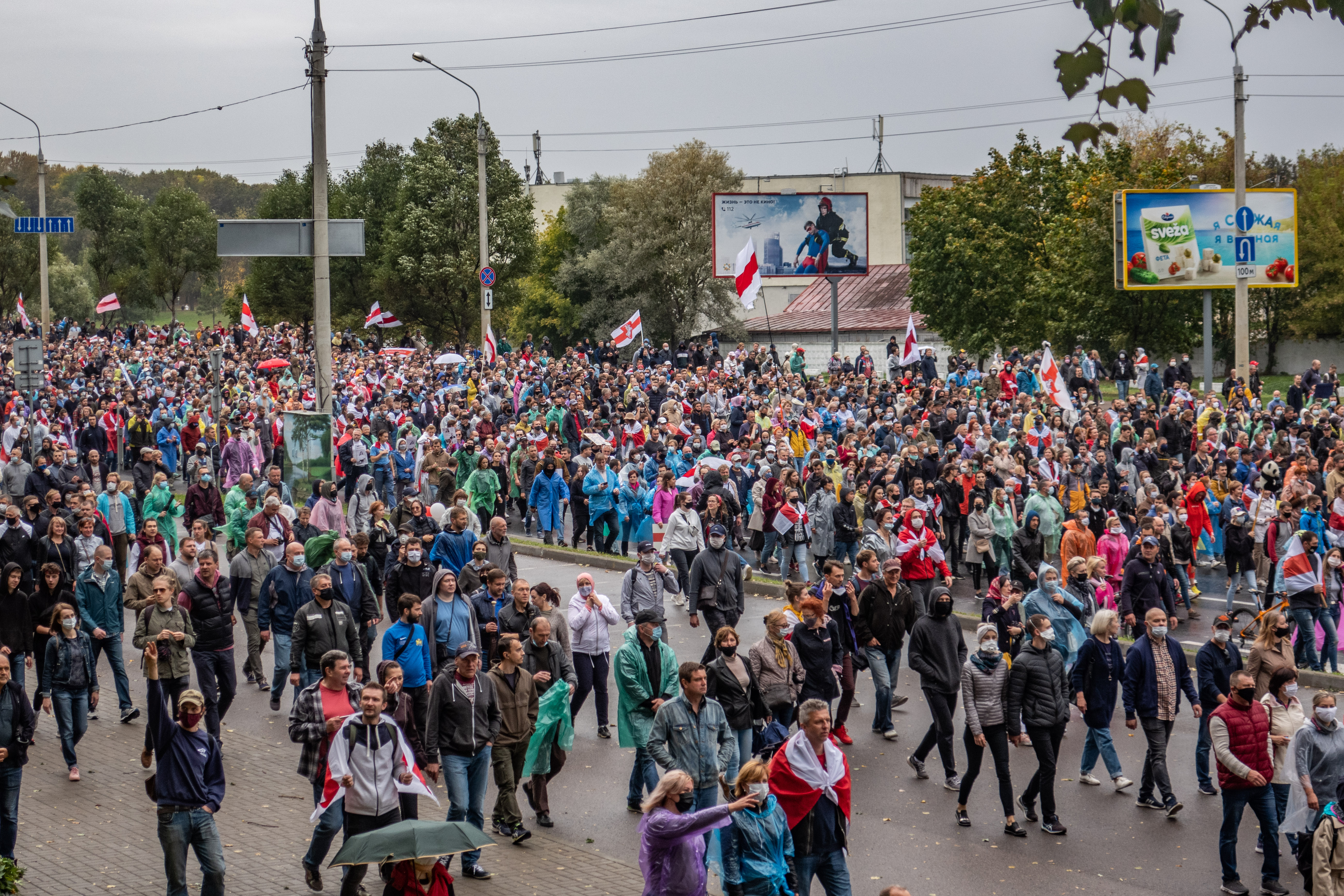
Anti-Lukashenko protest rally. Minsk, 27 September

On 27 September, another rally of more than 100,000 protestors named "March of 97%" was organized in Minsk in support of Tsikhanouskaya. Overall, 393 people were detained.

On 29 September, Tsikhanouskaya met with president Emmanuel Macron in Vilnius, where they discussed the overall situation in Belarus, Russia's involvement, as well as possible ways to resolve the crisis. Two people involved in the 19 June police resistance incident which occurred during a chain of solidarity dispersal attempt in Maladzyechna were sentenced to 3 years and 3 months of imprisonment. In Homel, the wife of a local activist, Natalia, was detained after her husband had been convicted of participating in the "March of 97%" on 27 September, and their children were put in foster care, which, according to Natalia, who herself had nothing to do with the protest, was a tactic employed by the local police to prevent people from organizing more protests out of fear for the safety of their relatives.

==== October ====
On 1 October, the TUT.BY news agency was stripped of its official media license for 3 months by the Ministry of Information under the pretext of receiving 4 warnings for publication of the protest-related articles. The TUT.BY chief editor, Marina Zolotova, stated that this move was expected and was primarily targeted to preventing TUT.BY journalists from lawfully reporting the protests.

On 2 October, a meeting took place between representatives of Ministry of Internal Affairs and other state bodies with the United Nations Resident Coordinator in Belarus, Joanna Kazana-Wisniowiecki, who expressed concern about the excessive use of force by law enforcement officers during the suppression of the protests and detentions of journalists covering the rallies. Kazana-Wisniowiecki emphasized the lack of information about the investigation of the unlawful actions of the Ministry's employees. The First Deputy Minister of Internal Affairs, Chief of Criminal Police, Gennady Kazakevich, denied all such facts and stated that every complaint about violence of law enforcement officers, including torture, were being looked into by the Investigation Committee. However, no details about the ongoing investigation were ever revealed.

On 3 October, a women's rally took place in Minsk, called "Bright Saturday" (which is also a wordplay on Tsikhanouskaya's given name, since "Sviatlana" is derived from "svietly" (Belarusian: свeтлы), meaning "bright"). The rally lasted for two hours. Although female protesters deliberately decided not to wear white-red-white clothes and not to show such symbols, bringing with them only flowers and cardboard posters, the riot police and "tikhari" were still present, and some detentions still took place. A group of motorcyclists was detained near the Kuntsaushchyna metro station while a passenger on a passing trolleybus tried to support them and was also detained immediately thereafter.

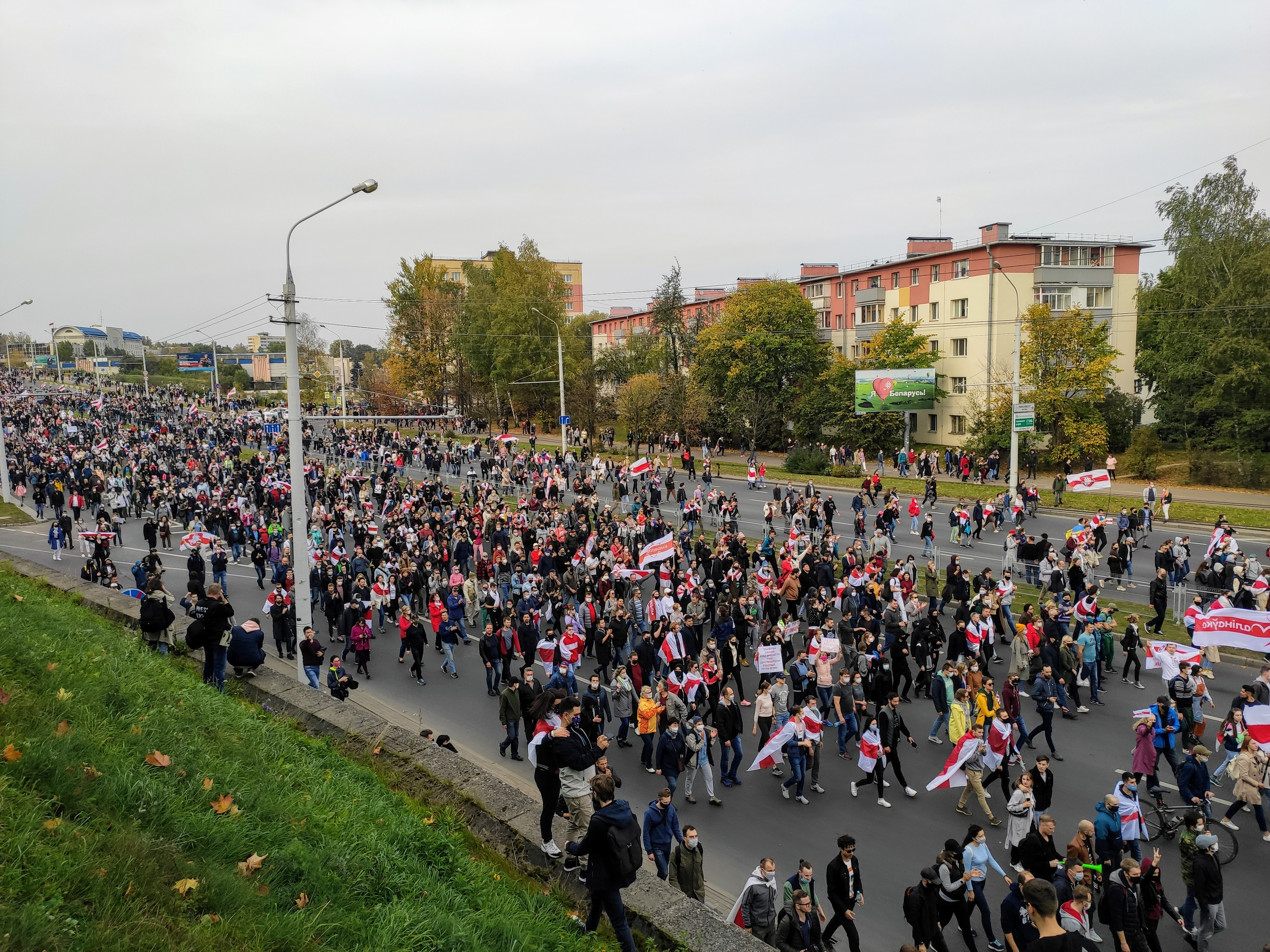
Anti-Lukashenko protest rally. Minsk, 4 October

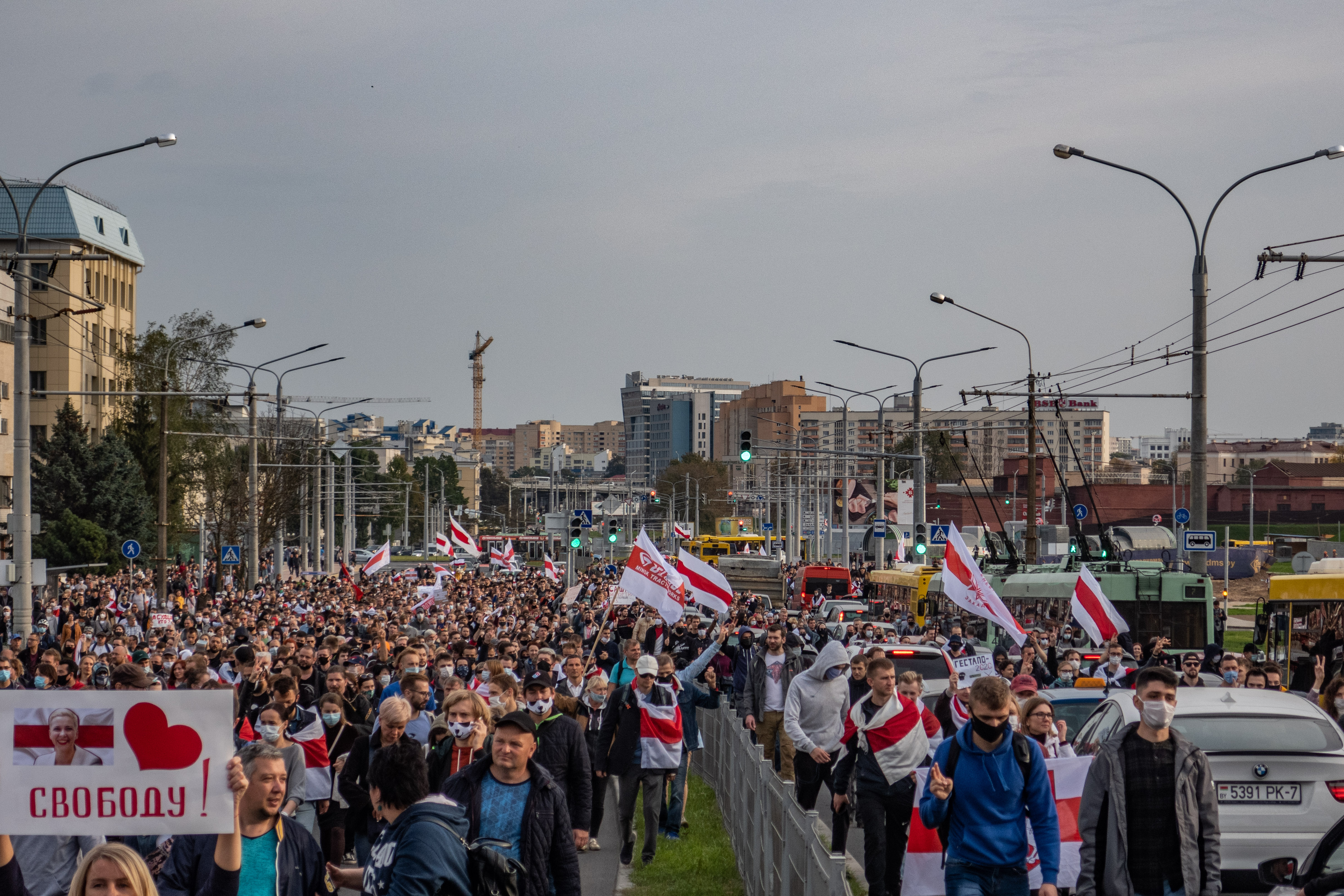
Anti-Lukashenko protest rally. Minsk, 4 October

On 4 October, the "March For Liberation" took place in Minsk with the protesters marching towards the Akrestsina detention center where political prisoners were believed to be held. Riot police, as well as several water cannons (one of which broke down), were employed to disperse the rally. The whole central area (Independence Square and Palace, Hero city obelisk, etc.) was routinely cut off by riot police, with means of armored carriers, barbed wire and "Rubezh" barriers. A ZS-82 sound broadcasting station with a powerful loudspeaker was installed on a BRDM-2 reconnaissance patrol car, through which Soviet songs were played. The Chinese Dongfeng Mengshi military off-road vehicles, as well as the Belarusian frontline VOLAT humvees were seen on the streets of Minsk. At 13:40 eight metro stations were closed. Mobile internet was cut off at around 13:50. Four shopping malls were closed "due to technical issues" at 14:00. The rally began at 14:05 and ended at around 18:15. The service was resumed between 18:30 and 19:00. Viasna agency reported protester detentions in Minsk as well as other places including Viciebsk and Homel.

On 5 October, around 100 seniors gathered outside St. Helen Church in Minsk, formed a column and rallied towards Independence Ave. Upon entering October Square, protesters lined up in a chain of solidarity, while being actively supported with honking from passing cars. Seniors then marched onto Victory Square, where they were met by young volunteers who gave them candy and water. Protesters held flowers and anti-government posters and were chanting patriotic songs and slogans, with the most famous one being the hymn "Mahutny Boža" ("God Almighty").

On 6 October, Tsikhanouskaya traveled to Berlin to meet with Chancellor Angela Merkel. Their encounter happened behind closed doors, with no journalists allowed. In Minsk, the Prosecutor's Office released a statement labeling the details of the ongoing investigation of the detention centers' employees' misconduct episodes as "restricted information".

On 7 October, a women's protest action took place, this time under the name "We are Walking!". Young women dressed in white-and-red or carrying white-and-red umbrellas marched along Independence Avenue. Some journalists reported seeing a Groza-S mobile counter-drone jamming station on the streets of Minsk later that day.

On 8 October, a former commander of a firefighting and emergency unit in Minsk, Artyom Ulyanov, who was fired the previous day for refusing to take down a white-red-white flag from a residential building, was fined for over $2,000 for premature contract termination. Viktor Snezhytsky, a member of the Council of the Republic of Belarus, resigned from his position "due to health problems" after making a statement against the current regime repressions in social media.

On 9 October, Cosmonauts Street in Minsk was blocked by the protesters. The Belarusian Fund for Cultural Solidarity was established with the purpose of providing legal, financial and psychological assistance to representatives of the Belarusian cultural community who actively express their civic position.

On 10 October, another Women's March took place in Minsk. Alexander Lukashenko met with some the imprisoned lead opposition figures, including Viktar Babaryka and Sergei Tikhanovsky, at the Amerikanka KGB detention center, reportedly, to discuss the details of the future constitutional reform. Sergei Tikhanovsky was allowed to talk to his wife, Sviatlana, over the phone for the first time since his arrest on 29 May. Near the evening, Cyber Partisans once again hacked a number of state-owned websites.

On 11 October, the "March of Pride" (marking two months of protests after the election) took place in regional centers of Belarus, reportedly involving more than 100,000 protesters in Minsk alone. The security forces' actions were characterized by increased brutality in comparison to the previous Sunday marches and involved mass detentions of journalists, severe beatings of detainees, employment of stun grenades, tear gas, rubber bullets, and water cannons with colored water, which led to some of the witnesses comparing these events to the events of 9–12 August. Eight metro stations, six shopping malls and mobile internet were out of service for most of the afternoon. According to the Belarusian Ministry of Internal Affairs, 713 protesters were detained on 11 October, with 25 protest actions registered across the country.

On 12 October, a "March of the Seniors" took place in Minsk and other regional centers, this time met with active police counter-action, including employment of tear gas and stun grenades. A statement was made by the Ministry of Internal Affairs granting security forces clearance to use lethal weapons, if necessary, due to "elevated coordination and radicalization" of the protests. In the evening, various actions of civil disobedience took place across Minsk, including blocking local traffic with burning tires, which lasted until 23:00, when military and OMON forces intervened. Vladimir Zaryankin, son of the mayor of Viciebsk, was detained in Minsk and had his car vandalized by unidentified men in balaklavas. In a statement, Belarusian deputy interior minister Gennady Kazakevich named anarchists among the organizers of the mass protests and authorized the use of lethal force against protestors.

On 13 October, on behalf of the Coordination Council, Sviatlana Tsikhanouskaya declared a 25 October ultimatum, threatening Lukashenko with a nationwide strike and civil disobedience actions if he didn't step down, release all political prisoners, and stop the violent crackdown on peaceful demonstrations by the deadline of 25 October 2020. Maxim Khoroshin, a co-owner of a flower store in Minsk who gifted flowers to women during the past women's marches, was detained and severely beaten by security forces for alleged water cannon disassembly and arson of the dacha of Dmitry Balaba, head of the Minsk OMON.

On 14 October, Mother's Day in Belarus, hundreds of women gathered at Independence Square near the Red Church in Minsk for the "March of Mothers" rally. At about 15:00 the participants formed a column and walked along Independence Ave toward Yakub Kolas Square, chanting "Freedom for our children", "One for all and all for one" and others. In addition to the "March of Mothers", there were also single-case demonstrations, solidarity chains, student speeches, etc. The rally concluded sometime after 18:30 at the newly formed "Kalesnikava Square" public space, where a concert was given by the Belarusian folk rock band Dzieciuki.

On 15 October, a drilling and blasting master of Belaruskali, Alexander Kurban, refused to leave the shaft at the end of his shift and remained chained at a depth of 440 metres demanding the general director of the enterprise to inform the labour collective of steps taken for new, open and fair elections, release of all political prisoners and termination of police violence. By 9:15 am. Kurban was brought to the surface and, accompanied by an employee of the Ministry of Internal Affairs, taken to a psychoneurological medical center where he was examined by medical staff and released.

On 16 October, Sviatlana Tsikhanouskaya was put on the wanted lists in Belarus and Russia on charges of "attempting to overthrow the constitutional order".

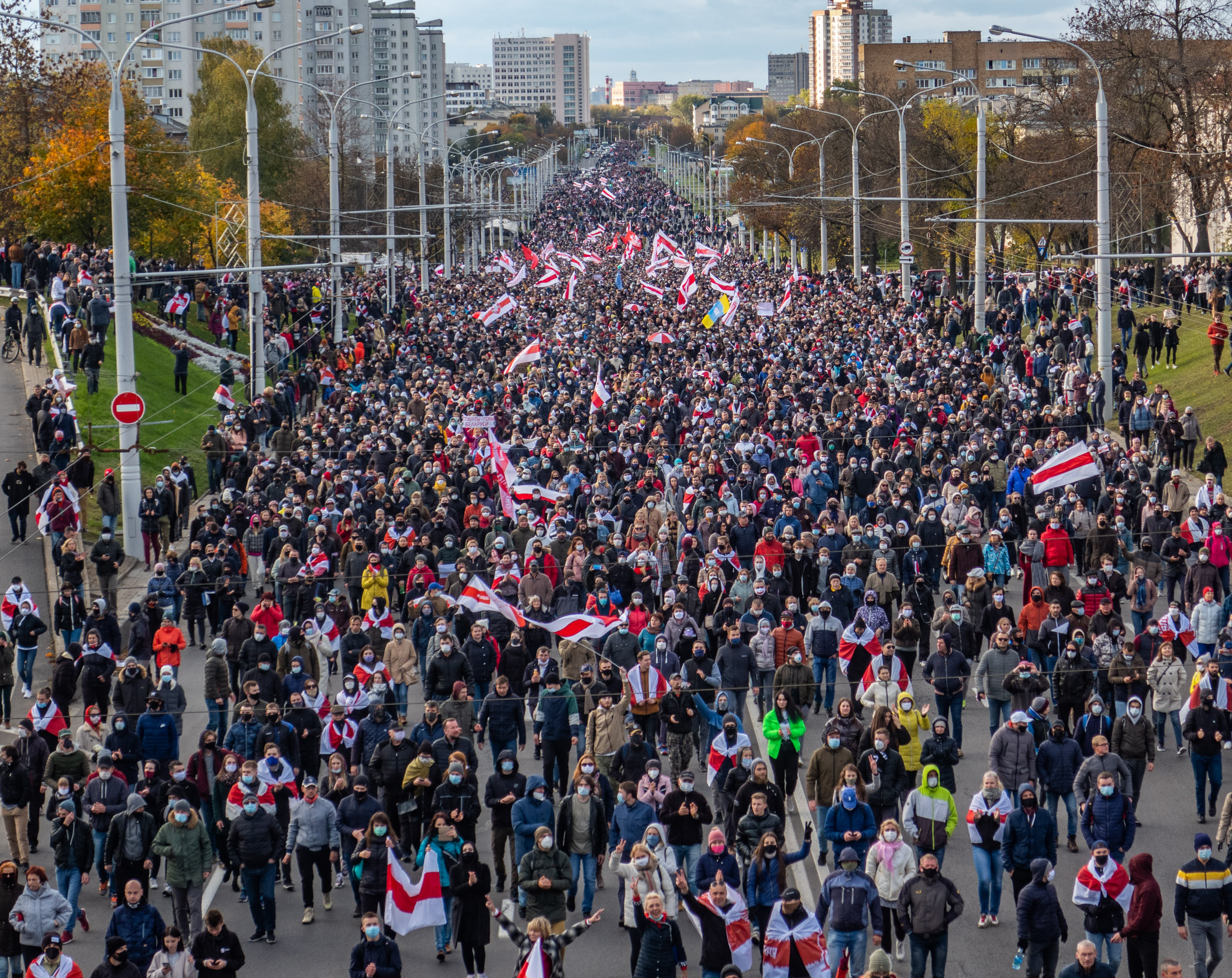
"March of Partisans" (anti-Lukashenko protest rally). Minsk, 18 October

On 18 October, the "March of Partisans" (named after the Belarusian partisan movement of World War II), involving more than 50,000 protesters, took place in Minsk and other regional centers, with the participants chanting "Strike!", "The workers are with the people", "You and your riot police get out!" and waving white-red-white opposition flags. The security forces used rubber bullets and stun grenades and blockaded streets with barbed wire and heavy machinery, including water cannons. Over 280 protesters were arrested during the Sunday protests, with most of the detentions having taken place in Minsk. Several underground metro stations were closed and there was decreased mobile internet coverage.

Protests continued on 19 October, when an estimated 3,000 retirees marched through Minsk while carrying flowers and chanting slogans demanding the resignation of Lukashenko, such as "Go away!". The counter-protest involved some 2,000 pro-Lukashenko elderly wearing military and security forces uniforms; the counter-protesters were reportedly transported in together by buses.

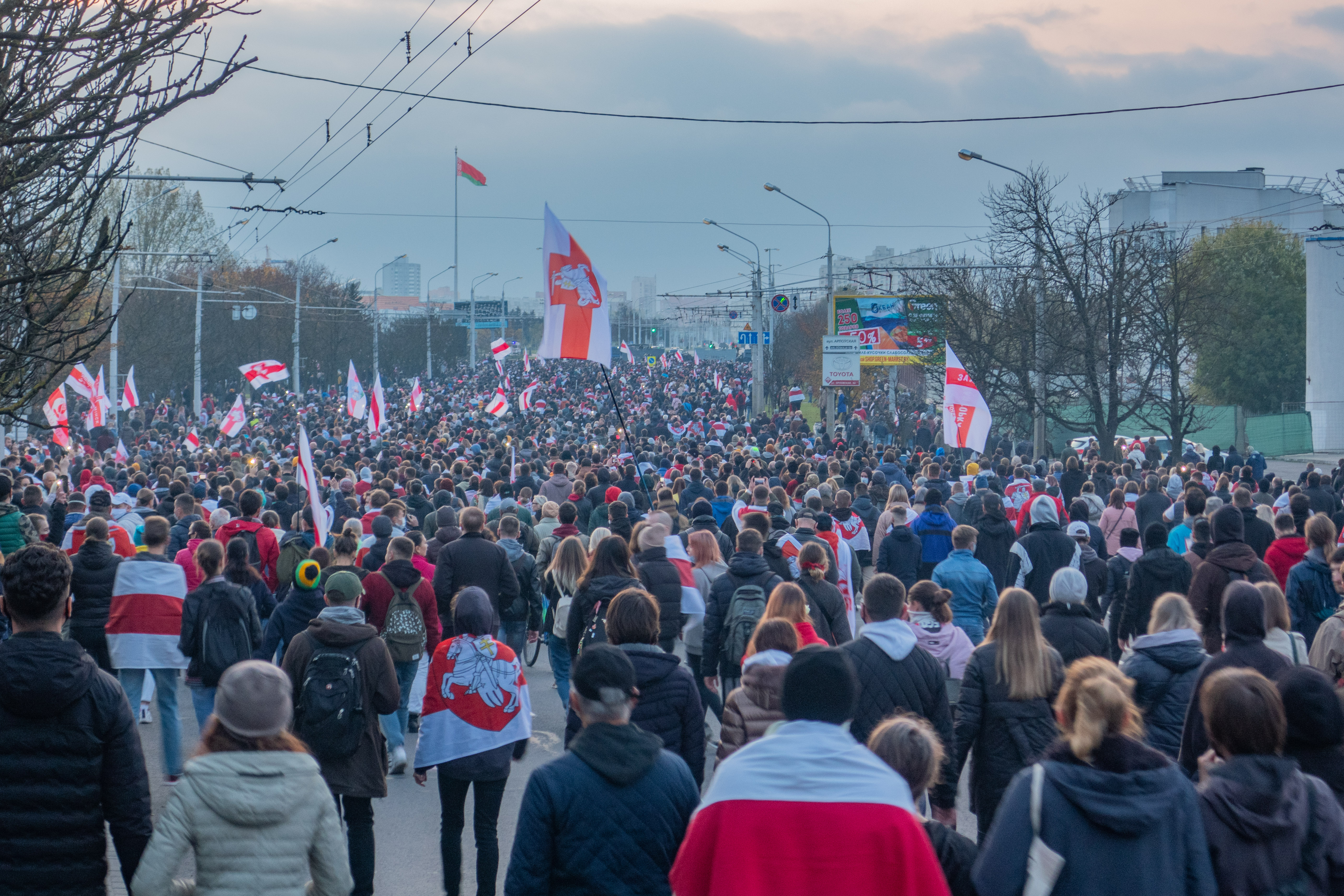
Anti-Lukashenko protest rally. Minsk, 25 October

On 25 October, about 100,000 people joined the "People's Ultimatum march" in Minsk. The Belarusian riot police were seen throwing stun grenades into crowds of protesters, chasing people through courtyards and making detentions. The authorities cut off mobile internet across central Minsk, closed metro stations and placed military cordons armed with firearms at key sites. Some of the protesters tried to hide inside their own apartments, which were then raided by police. The human rights center Viasna said over 500 protesters were detained on Sunday, 350 persons will stand administrative trials. According to Russian news agencies, at least 10 stun grenades were used. There were also reports that riot police had fired rubber bullets.

On 26 October, groups of workers and students in Belarus carried out a nationwide strike call by Tsikhanouskaya. Workers at some state-run plants put down their tools, left the buildings and chanted slogans outside. Hundreds of students also rallied on university campuses in Minsk while clapping, chanting, and forming solidarity chains. At least 155 people were arrested for supporting the strike action in Minsk, Barysau, Brest, Hrodna, Mahiliou, and Navapolatsk.

On 28 October, 4 Belarusian anarchist activists (Igor Alinevich, Dmitry Dubovsky, Dmitry Rezanovich, and Sergey Romanov) were arrested near the Belarusian-Ukrainian border. The government and state media accused them of terrorism. They were charged under criminal code articles 289 (terrorism; up to the death penalty) and 295 (arms trafficking; up to 12 years in prison). The anarchists were accused of setting fire to four cars near the building of the prosecutor's office in Salihorsk (Minsk Region) and the local branch of the State Committee for Forensic Expertise.

On 31 October, hundreds of women marched in central Minsk, chanting "Freedom!" and "Fair Elections!" as they carried white-red-white flags and banners. Around 40 people were detained in Minsk, Hrodna, and other Belarusian cities.

==== November ====
On 1 November, about 20,000 demonstrators marched in Minsk. They gathered in eastern Minsk and headed toward Kurapaty where over 200,000 people were executed during the Great Purge. Protesters carried banners with slogans such as "The people's memory (lasts) longer than a life of a dictatorship" and "Stop torturing your people!". Ahead of the march, security forces had already cordoned off several central squares in Minsk, closed several metro stations and mobile internet was disrupted. Security forces also used flash grenades, tear gas, and batons to disperse the crowds. Some motorists tried to block the movement of vehicles intended to carry off detainees. The Interior Ministry of Belarus said that about 300 people were detained in Minsk and the Minsk region for breaking laws on mass gatherings. Four journalists were among those detained on 1 November, two of whom were severely beaten. The Investigative Committee said 231 of those arrested were recognized as suspects in a criminal case that had been opened into "actions that grossly violate public order." Lukashenko allegedly used security forces to stop demonstrators from gathering and warned that his government "would not back down."

On 2 November, more than 1,000 demonstrators took part in a march in Minsk. Many of them were pensioners. They carried the banned white-red-white flags and chanted slogans such as "Lukashenko! Tribunal!" and "Until victory, until the end!" during the march. No detentions were reported during the Monday protest.

On 7 November, hundreds of people took part in a women's march. About 60 doctors and other health-care workers gathered against Lukashenko were taken away to police stations. At least 14 people were detained at the women's march in Minsk.

On 8 November, several thousand people marched in Minsk. Participants in the march waved white-red-white flags and umbrellas. Security forces blocked several streets and cordoned off areas in central Minsk. Access to the Internet was restricted in Minsk since the morning. Several subway stations in the city center closed an hour before the rally, citing "passenger safety." Police used batons and rubber bullets to disperse the crowds. At least 1,053 protesters were detained in Minsk, Homel, Viciebsk, Zhlobin, and other cities. At least nine of those listed as detained were journalists. Video and photos showed unmarked men wrestling demonstrators to the ground and forcing them into police transport.

On 13 November, thousands of people rallied in Minsk and other Belarusian cities following the death of 31-year-old opposition supporter Raman Bandarenka, who reportedly was beaten by security forces. Participants carrying flowers and candles formed human chains of solidarity to honor the late Bandarenka, who died at a Minsk hospital after several hours of surgery for serious injuries. Some of the banners the demonstrators held said, "Stop killing us." In a video from the courtyard where Bondarenko was detained, hundreds of people stood in a minute of silence on Friday and then chanted: "We will not forget, we will not forgive." The Ministry of Internal Affairs denied responsibility for Bondarenko's death, saying he was killed due to a scuffle with civilians. The European Union condemned the violent crackdown.

AMAP/OMON troopers arresting and beating protesters. Minsk, 15 November

On 15 November, tens of thousands of Belarusians gathered across Belarus protested against the death in police custody of Bandarenka, arrested for his opposition to Lukashenko. Demonstrators in Minsk carried the banned white-red-white flags and chanted slogans like, "Lukashenko! Tribunal!" and "Long live Belarus!" The security forces used tear gas, rubber bullets, stun grenades, and batons to disperse the demonstrators in Minsk. Mobile Internet was down and several subway stations were closed. More than 1,200 protesters were detained in Minsk and other cities, including in Homel, Hrodna, and Mahiliou.

On 16 November, the "March of Sorrow" took place in Minsk; more than 2,000 people marched. Many of them were pensioners and medics. They chanted slogans such as "Murderers!" and "Tribunal!" during the march. Authorities blocked central Independence Square and nearby streets while several subway stations were closed. No detentions were reported.

On 22 November, tens of thousands of people gathered in several places around Minsk, chanting "Long live Belarus!" and carrying signs and the white-red-white flags. Protesters gathered in residential areas and then came together in Minsk to avoid getting shut down early by police. Several metro stations were closed and communications were cut at times. Outside one subway station in central Minsk, demonstrators were met with flashbang grenades. Masked and balaclava-wearing officers ripped flags from some people's hands in another location. Security forces deployed heavily around Minsk with armored vehicles and water cannons before the rally. At least 379 protesters were detained in Minsk and other cities of Belarus. At least 13 detained protesters were taken to hospitals after they were beaten by riot police and other security forces involved in dispersing the protests.

The Belarusian Autocephalous Orthodox Church (not to be confused with the Belarusian Orthodox Church) announced an anathema against Lukashenko, publicly declaring him an "executioner of the Belarusian people".

On 23 November, a "March of Wisdom" took place in Minsk, several thousand pensioners marched. They carried the white-red-white flags and shouted "Freedom for political prisoners!" and "Murderers!". Black-clad security forces wearing balaclavas blocked the columns of elderly protesters to prevent them from entering Independence Avenue. At least six people were detained, including two elderly women in their 70s, who were later released. Minor scuffles were reported, with witnesses saying security forces pushed several of the elderly onto the asphalt.

On 24 November, a well known anarchist organizer and protester Mikola Dziadok was arrested. According to Mikalai he was forcefully taken from his residence by police. He claims he was beaten by the police who attempted to gain information on anarchist activities. After refusing the police pepper sprayed Mikalai. He claimed he was batoned, kicked, stun-gunned, pepper-sprayed and forced to make a confession on video. Mikalai's face can be seen badly beaten while making the confession. While in custody Mikalai was threatened with rape and murder. Authorities state that Mikalai is being charged for organizing multiple mass protests and riots in Belarus. Mikalai denies these accusations, and is currently held as a political prisoner.

On 29 November, a "March of Neighbors" took place in Minsk. Demonstrators carried the white-red-white flags and chanted "Go away, rat!", referring to Lukashenko. The opposition adopted a new strategy as a way of decentralizing the protests and making it more difficult for police to round up activists. At least 20 protests took place in Minsk. In some areas, separate rallies merged to form columns of several hundred people. Police deployed tear gas and stun grenades to break up some of the crowds in Minsk, and some were chased into residential courtyards and beaten with batons. Before the rally, water cannons, armored vehicles and police vans were seen in the center of Minsk. Mobile Internet services were not available in Minsk and the central metro stations were closed. There were also reports of power cuts in some neighborhoods. At least 416 protesters were detained in Minsk, Brest, Hrodna, Barauliany, and other cities. Six persons were reportedly taken to hospitals after being beaten by riot police and other law enforcement officers. Two journalists were detained despite carrying valid press IDs.

On 30 November, a "March of Wisdom" took place in Minsk. More than 1,000 pensioners marched, chanting 'Shame!', 'Grandmas and grandpas, let's march to the victory!' and 'Long live Belarus!'. Police blocked the protesters along their planned route, dividing them into smaller groups. At least 20 people were detained.

==== December ====
On 1 December, Tsikhanouskaya stated that a "book of crimes", to be verified by independent lawyers, would be created to document police abuse. She stated, "Impunity will not last forever… No one will be able to deprive hundreds of thousands of people who are striving for justice from speaking out."

On 6 December, a "March of Neighbors" took place. Thousands of demonstrators marched in Minsk and other cities. Local media reported several dozen meeting points were planned across Minsk and in other cities. Most protesters marched in remote residential areas of Minsk, clapping hands, shouting "Long live Belarus!", "We believe! We can! We will win!", and waving the white-red-white flag. Several people wore Santa Claus costumes and masks. People carried banners that read "Give Belarusians a gift: go away," depicting Alexander Lukashenko. Military vehicles and water cannons were seen on the streets of Minsk, while uniformed men, many in helmets, grabbed people in civilian clothes. Authorities limited connection to networks such as Telegram, several subway stations were briefly closed and at least two squares were cordoned off by security forces. At least 340 people were detained in several Minsk districts and other cities across the country, including Brest and Hrodna.

On 7 December, a "March of Wisdom" took place in Minsk. Several hundred people, including many retirees and medics, gathered in Yakub Kolas Square. Police blocked them from holding the event and dispersed the crowd. Police also tried to block the protesters from entering Independence Avenue. A small group of demonstrators managed to regroup at a Christmas tree on Independence Square. At least 10 people were detained.

On 13 December, crowds of people protested in Minsk. Thousands were estimated to have taken part in small rallies scattered around more than 70 different areas in Minsk. Some of them waved the white-red-white flags and chanted "Lukashenko, go away!" and "Long Live Belarus!" In several places, groups of protesters were led by people wearing Santa Claus costumes. At least 286 people were detained.

On 14 December, a "Wisdom March" took place in Minsk. Up to 150 protesters, including many retirees, medics and students, gathered at Independence Square. Some of them were holding the white-red-white flags and chanted "[Lukashenko,] go away!", "Long live Belarus!" and "Freedom for political prisoners!". Security forces cordoned off roads, preventing them from moving along Independence Avenue. At least 106 people were detained.

On 19 December, several marches were reported in several districts of Minsk. Many of the protesters carried the white-red-white flag or banners. There were marches and rallies in other cities, including Hrodna. There were no reports of demonstrators being detained by riot police.

On 20 December, marches and rallies were reported in several districts of Minsk, with many carrying the white-red-white flag or banners. Protests were also held in other towns and cities across Belarus, including Barysaŭ, Homel, Hrodna, Salihorsk, Smilavičy, Navapolatsk and Brest. Police with dogs patrolled the streets and water cannons were deployed. At least 152 people were detained.

On 27 December, the March of Balloons took place in Minsk, with people throughout Belarus releasing white-red-white balloons, flags and other symbols into the sky. People gathered in their neighborhoods and then moved to the places previously defined in local chats. Many carried the white-red-white flag and chanted slogans such as "Long live Belarus!". There were reports of detentions in Minsk, Brest and Svietlahorsk.

=== 2021 ===
On 3 January, marches were reported across Minsk. People carried white-red-white or red-and-green flags and chanted "Long live Belarus!" and "We believe! We can! We will win!" There were no reports of detentions. At least ten people were detained by law enforcement officers at separate rallies on 1 January.

On 9 January, marches were reported in several towns. People carried the white-and-red national flags. In an effort to avoid arrest by Lukashenko's security forces, protesters resorted to so-called "flash-mob" tactics, gathering at locations announced on social media at the last minute.

On 10 January, protests were reported in Minsk, Viciebsk, Brest, Hrodna, and Mahiliou. People carried the white-and-red national flags. The Ministry of Internal Affairs said 40 people were detained in Minsk.

On 17 January, protesters marched in parks and residential areas of several cities and towns across Belarus. The independent BelaPAN news agency reported that protesters staged at least 30 marches and rallies on 17 January, including in Minsk, Brest, Hrodna, and Homel. Many of the protesters carried the white-red-white flag or banners. There were reports of arrests.

On 22 January, a man set himself on fire outside the Government House in Minsk. He was hospitalized after passers-by and police put out the flames with a fire extinguisher.

On 24 January, groups of protesters linked arms to form human chains in a show of solidarity with political prisoners. At least 155 people were detained.

Protesters used their balconies nightly for several days from 2 February and chanted "Long live Belarus!" and "Lukashenko behind bars!", waving flags and using the lights on their mobile phones. Rallies and chants took place throughout Minsk on 7 February, the largest protest movement in the city since 24 January.

On 8 February, Amnesty International claimed that the "Belarusian authorities are resorting to threats, harassment and prosecution of children".

On 25 March, Sviatlana Tsikhanouskaya called for renewed protests on Freedom Day against Alexander Lukashenko to mount pressure on him to resign. During the day's protests, in which small groups marched through the streets of Minsk, more than 200 people were arrested. The Belarusian authorities managed to suppress these protests, after which there were no mass actions of disobedience in the country.

On 24 May, Alexander Lukashenko signed into law a series of legal amendments in order to further restrict future protests, making it compulsory for all mass events to be authorized by local authorities and preventing journalists from participating.
