= Artsiom Brukhan =

Belarusian politician and dissident in exile

- Арцём Брухан
- Brukhan in November 2025

Speaker of the Coordination Council
- Incumbent
- Assumed office 14 May 2025
- Preceded by: Anzhalika Melnikava

Deputy Representative for the Transfer of Power of the United Transitional Cabinet
- In office 3 August 2024 – 15 May 2025

Personal details
- Born: 1991 (age 34–35) Brest, Belarus
- Party: Coalition of Pavel Latushka and the Movement "For Freedom"
- Education: A.S. Pushkin Brest State University
- Occupation: Historian, politician

Artsiom Brukhan (Belarusian: Арцём Ігаравіч Брухан; Russian: Артём Игоревич Брухан, romanized: Artyom Igorevich Brukhan; born 1991) is a Belarusian politician in exile who has served as Speaker of the Coordination Council, the representative body of the Belarusian democratic forces, since May 2025. A historian by training, he worked at the Brest Fortress memorial complex and in the Brest regional administration before leaving Belarus in 2020. In exile he became deputy head of the National Anti-Crisis Management led by Pavel Latushko, served as deputy representative of the United Transitional Cabinet for the transfer of power in 2024–2025, and was elected speaker of the Council after the disappearance of his predecessor, Anzhalika Melnikava. He was re-elected speaker of the Council's fourth convocation in June 2026.

== Early life and career ==
Brukhan was born in Brest and graduated from the history faculty of A.S. Pushkin Brest State University. On graduating he was assigned to the museum of the Brest Fortress memorial complex, where he worked from 2012 to 2017, rising to senior researcher. In 2017 he joined the Brest Regional Executive Committee, where he worked in the department for ideology, culture and youth affairs, overseeing the preservation of historical and cultural heritage and the region's museums.

During the 2020 Belarusian protests Brukhan remained in his post at the regional administration. He resigned the day after the death of Raman Bandarenka in November 2020 and subsequently left Belarus for Poland.

== Political activity in exile ==
In Poland Brukhan joined the National Anti-Crisis Management (NAM), the structure founded by former minister Pavel Latushko, working as an analyst and later becoming its deputy head. In the May 2024 election to the third convocation of the Coordination Council he ran eleventh on the list "Pavel Latushka's Team and the Movement 'For Freedom'", which won the largest number of seats, and was elected a delegate. On 3 August 2024, at the "New Belarus" conference in Vilnius, Sviatlana Tsikhanouskaya appointed him deputy representative of the United Transitional Cabinet for the transfer of power, under Latushko.

== Speaker of the Coordination Council ==
=== Third convocation ===
In March 2025 the speaker of the Council, Anzhalika Melnikava, disappeared after leaving Poland; Polish authorities opened an investigation, and the deputy speaker, Stanislava Hlinik, served as acting speaker. Latushko's faction nominated Brukhan for the vacancy. On 14 May 2025 the Council elected him speaker with 50 of the 69 votes cast; his opponent, Aliaksandr Knyrovich of the "Belarusians" faction, received 11 votes and eight delegates abstained. Following his election he resigned his post in the United Transitional Cabinet.

Before the vote Brukhan had proposed amending the Council's statute to create a second deputy speaker post, so that the burden and risks of leadership would not rest on a single person; on 21 May 2025 Lizaveta Prakopchyk was elected to the new post. Under his speakership the Council formed a military commission in July 2025, after voting in June to support the creation of Belarusian units within the armed forces of foreign states, and on 31 July 2025 adopted a resolution calling for a "round table" between the democratic forces and the de facto authorities of Belarus, which Brukhan defended as documenting the country's situation and keeping the offer of negotiations open. In August 2025 the Council held hearings on the reports of the United Transitional Cabinet's representatives, at which Tsikhanouskaya also spoke. In October 2025 the Council held hearings on a draft law on gender equality, and Brukhan welcomed a European Parliament resolution of the same month that described the Council as a key institution of the Belarusian democratic movement.

In April 2026, ahead of the election to the Council's fourth convocation, Brukhan published a response to critics within the democratic movement who had suggested that the Council should dissolve itself, arguing for its inter-parliamentary work and proposing that the Council be given the power to appoint, rather than merely recommend, the Cabinet's representatives.

=== Fourth convocation ===
In the May 2026 election Brukhan was returned as a delegate on the list of the Coalition of Pavel Latushka and the Movement "For Freedom", which won 34 of the 80 seats. On 20 June 2026 the new convocation re-elected him speaker with 62 of the 66 votes cast; his opponent, Andrei Kolas of the "Your Voice" faction, received four. The "United Civic Platform" faction boycotted the vote, stating that several factions had not been properly informed about the nomination procedure. In a statement on his re-election Brukhan called for the Council to focus on keeping Belarus out of further military escalation and on creating conditions for a national dialogue. In July 2026 he described the adoption of a resolution on Belarus by the OSCE Parliamentary Assembly as a result of lobbying by the democratic forces, including members of the Council.

== Persecution ==
On 24 April 2025 the Belarusian Ministry of Information added Brukhan's Instagram account to the national list of "extremist materials".
