= Sergei Dylevsky =

Belarusian pro-democracy activist

Siarhei Dylevsky
- Сяргей Дылеўскі; Сергей Дылевский
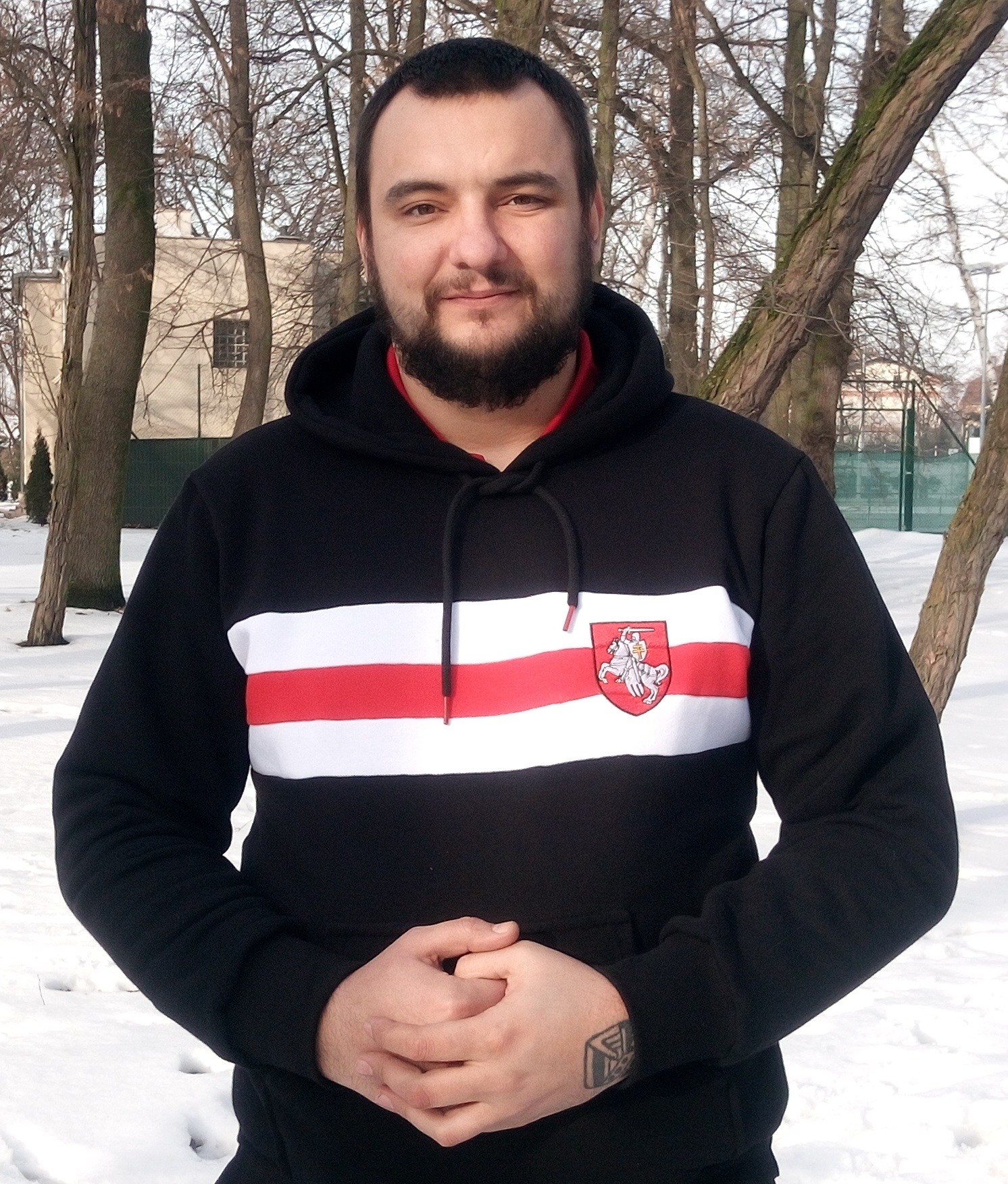
- Dylevsky in 2020
- Born: 1 September 1989 (age 36); Minsk, Byelorussian SSR, Soviet Union (now Belarus)
- Citizenship: Belarus
- Occupation: Engineer
- Known for: Activist, dissident

Siarhei A. Dylevsky or Sergei A. Dylevsky (Belarusian: Сяргей Дылеўскі; Russian: Сергей Дылевский; born 1 September 1989) is a Belarusian engineer and, as of 22 August 2020, a member of the presidium of the Coordination Council that aims to coordinate a transition of political power in Belarus in the context of the 2020 Belarusian protests and the 2020 Belarusian presidential election.

== Early years ==
Dylevsky was born on 1 September 1989, in Minsk to working-class parents, who, as of 2020, were employees at Minsk Tractor Works (MTZ). He studied machine construction at a technical college in Minsk, and chose to become a steel temperer.

== 2020 election protests ==
Following the 2020 Belarusian presidential election and continuing 2020 Belarusian protests in early August 2020, Dylevsky was angered by security forces' violent crackdown on protestors. He drove several protestors to hospitals and called for a strike at Minsk Tractor Works (MTZ). He was joined in the strike by workers calling for political prisoners to be release and for new elections, leading a group of 1,000 workers on a march to the centre of Minsk.

On 17 August, Dylevsky led a march of 5,000 striking MTZ workers. The next day, Dylevsky stated that 50 people demonstrating in front of MTZ to support the workers were detained. On the 19th, Dylevsky was chosen as one of the members of the presidium of the Coordination Council, which aims to coordinate a transition of political power from president Alexander Lukashenko who claims to have won the 9 August 2020 Belarusian presidential election. On the 20th, Alexander Konyuk, the Prosecutor-General of Belarus, initiated criminal proceedings against the members of the Coordination Council under Article 361 of the Belarusian Criminal Code, on the grounds of attempting to seize state power and harming national security.

By 21 August, Dylevsky had become a "political star" according to the New York Times. Dylevsky stated that he considered the Belarusian industrial system to be inefficient and that the lack of oligarchs in Belarus was "far from being an achievement", since it meant that "sound" business people did not wish to invest in Belarus. Dylevsky stated that politics would be "the last thing [that he] would like to do" and then stated his intention to remove Lukashenko from power. He considers Sviatlana Tsikhanouskaya to be the legitimate president of Belarus. He argued that "Most of all, Lukashenko fears the factory workers' protest, so he tries to scare strike organisers and stop the strikes."

=== Legal pressure ===
On 21 August 2020, Dylevsky and fellow presidium member Maxim Znak entered the premises of the Investigative Committee of the State Security Committee of the Republic of Belarus (KGB) for interrogation; they were later released.

On 24 August 2020, Dylevsky was detained by the security services along with fellow presidium member Olga Kovalkova whilst they both attempted to support striking workers at the Minsk Tractor Works factory. He was sentenced to 10 days' imprisonment the following day.

As of 27 August 2020, Dylevsky's lawyer has been unable to meet with him. On 21 September 2020 he was released from prison. In October 2020, Dylevsky left Belarus to resettle in Warsaw.

In March 2023, Dylevsky was convicted to 12 years in prison in absentia. Tsikhanouskaya and several other leaders of the 2020 protests were convicted in absentia on the same day.

== Awards and recognitions ==
In December 2020, Dylevsky was named among the representatives of the Democratic Belarusian opposition, honored with the Sakharov Prize by the European Parliament.
