= Trade unions in Belarus =

Trade unions in Belarus are legally independent under International Labour Organization (ILO) conventions since 1956. In the early twenty-first century, Belarusian trade unions were subject to harassment and intimidation from government authorities. New trade unions and local unions were created with help from the ProfSoyuz Online working group of the Coordination Council during the 2020 Belarusian protests starting in mid-September 2020.

== Twentieth century ==
Belarus ratified the International Labour Organization (ILO) Convention No. 87, the Freedom of Association and Protection of the Right to Organise Convention, and ILO Convention No. 98, the Right to Organise and Collective Bargaining Convention, 1949, in 1956.

== Early twenty-first century ==
The International Centre for Trade Union Rights (ICTUR) stated that independent trade unions in Belarus had formal rights but difficulties in operating practically, with "considerable harassment and intimidation". An ILO commission visited Belarus in 2004 in response to concerns about unions' rights. The ICTU judged the problems to have been insufficiently resolved, commenting on police raids in 2017 against three people active in independent Belarusian trade unions.

Around 2018, the biggest trade union coalitions in Belarus were the Federation of Trade Unions of Belarus (FPB), with 4 million members, affiliated with the World Federation of Trade Unions, and the Belarusian Congress of Democratic Trade Unions (BKDP), with 9000 members, affiliated with the International Trade Union Confederation.

== 2020 protests ==
=== ProfSoyuz Online ===
In mid-September 2020, during the 2020 Belarusian protests that followed the 2020 Belarusian presidential election, the Coordination Council created a working group, ProfSoyuz Online, for encouraging the creation of independent unions, along with seven other working groups. The online activities of the working group, founded by Marina Vorobei (Russian: Марина Воробей), aim to provide Belarusians interested in creating trade union locals within the existing Belarusian legal framework with information, with help in contacting others with similar interests in creating locals, and with contacts to existing trade unions. The online service is run by human volunteers and chatbots. Volunteers provide help to people wishing to create their own locals or trade unions.

As of 21 October 2020, local unions had been created in affiliation with 25 independent unions in 60 companies in 20 towns with the help of ProfSoyuz Online. In Naftan, 2500 quit the government-associated trade union and 500 joined the independent one. In two factories in Grodno, Accent (Russian: Акцент) and Conte (Russian: Конте), all the employees quit the government union and created locals affiliated with independent trade unions. Doctors in Minsk created a health worker local union called "White Robes".

=== Independent unions ===
Marina Vorobei of ProfSoyuz Online stated in October 2020 that independent trade unions existing as of mid-October 2020 included the Belarusian Independent Trade Union (BNP), the Belarus Free Trade Union (SPB), the Belarusian Trade Union of Radioelectronic Industry Workers (REP), and the Free Trade Union of Metalworkers.

At least three workers of Byelorussian Steel Works (BMZ) were fired in early 2021 after trying to organize local branch of Belarusian Independent Trade Union (BNP).

== See also ==
- Belarus Free Trade Union
