= National Anti-Crisis Management =

Belarusian political organisation

- Abbreviation: NAM
- Founders: Coordination Council
- Types: organization
- Country: Belarus
- Directors: Pavel Latushko
- Website: belarus-nau.org/en

National Anti-Crisis Management (NAM) (Belarusian: Народнае антыкрызіснае ўпраўленне, romanized: Narodnaje antykryzisnaje wprawlennie, Russian: Народное Антикризисное Управление, romanized: Narodnoe Antikrizisnoe Upravlenie, Polish: Narodowy Zarząd Antykryzysowy; also People's Anti-Crisis Administration, NAU) is a "shadow-government-like" organisation created in Belarus by Pavel Latushko in late October 2020 during the 2020 Belarusian protests with approval of the Belarusian Coordination Council. In 2022, a complementary cabinet structure, the United Transitional Cabinet, was created, with Latushko holding responsibility for the transition of power.

In January 2023, the Ministry of Internal Affairs of Belarus designated NAU as an extremist group.

== Creation and termination ==
National Anti-Crisis Management was created in late October 2020 with the goal of managing a peaceful transfer of power. According to NAM, the Coordination Council of Belarus approved the principles of NAM on 26 October 2020.

NAM states that it will lose its powers when a "new president of Belarus is inaugurated."

== Leadership and structure ==
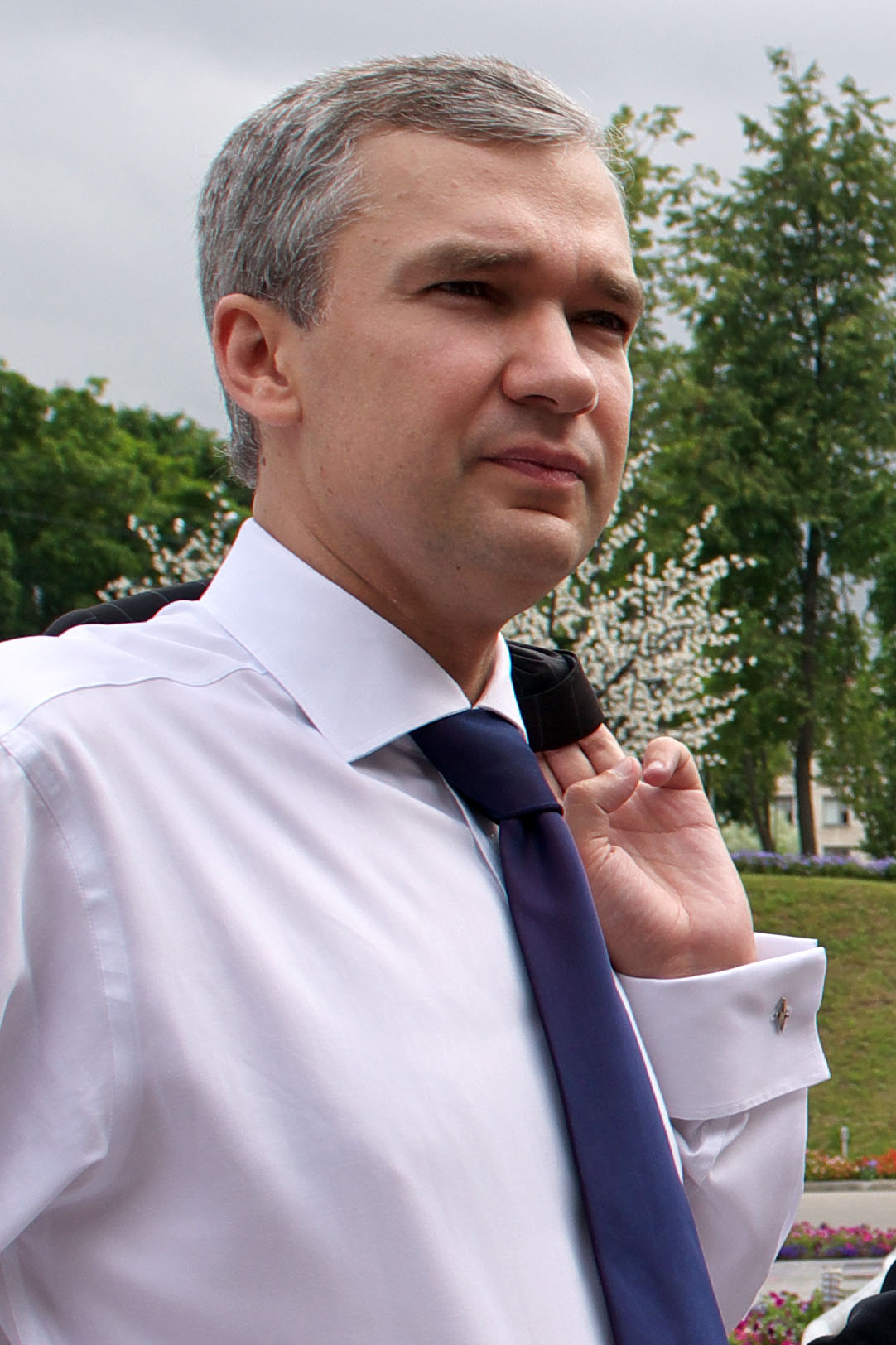
Pavel Latushko, head of NAM

=== November 2020 ===
Pavel Latushko, a member of the Coordination Council, was the first head of NAM at its creation in 2020. Like many other Belarusian opposition politicians and democratic activists Latushko was forced to escape to Poland to avoid persecution by Alexander Lukashenko's regime due to series of repressions after presidential election in August 2020. NAM is a complementary group to the support team of Sviatlana Tsikhanouskaya, the presumed winner of the 2020 Belarusian presidential election, and to the Coordination Council. Olga Kovalkova of the Coordination Council is responsible for communication with the council.

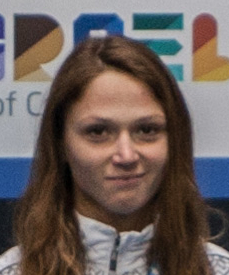
Aliaksandra Herasimenia, NAM: youth and sports

Leaders of NAM's six fields of actions included:

1. economics and finance – vacant as of 16 November 2020
2. foreign policy and trade – Anatoly Kotov, born in 1980 (age 44–45)
3. justice – Mikhail Kirilyuk, born in 1983 (age 41–42)
4. security – Vadim Prokopiev, born in 1971 (age 53–54)
  - BYPOL representative – Andrei Ostapovich, born in 1993 (age 31–32)
5. social policy – vacant as of 16 November 2020
  - youth and sports – Aliaksandra Herasimenia, born in 1985 (age 39–40)
  - culture and national heritage – Margarita Levchuk, born in 1990 (age 34–35)
6. regional development – Yury Hubarevich, born in 1978 (age 46–47)

and Elena Zhivoglod, born in 1991 (age 33–34) as Coordinator.

=== 2022 ===
In 2022, the structure of NAM was revised, with Pavel Latushko remaining head of NAM. Leaders for specific fields of administrative actions include:

1. Vladzimir Astapenka, deputy head of NAM, and responsible for foreign policy
2. Yury Hubarevich, responsible for regional development
3. Natalya Zaderkovskaya, responsible for socio-cultural issues
4. Mikhail Kirilyuk, legal adviser
5. Artsiom Praskalovich, legal counsel for domesty policy and public administration

== Goals ==
Latushko described the goals of NAM as "creating a team of specialists responsible for the development and implementation of these plans". NAM's plans for a peaceful transfer of power include two options, based on its view that the de facto Lukashenko government is illegitimate and violated the Constitution of Belarus. NAM stated that it would prefer the Constitutional Option, but proceed to the Legal Sovereignty Option if Lukashenko refused the Constitutional Option.

=== Constitutional Option ===
The Constitutional Option of power transition through public dialogue starts with a prerequisite of the "end of violence against civilians, [the] release of all political prisoners," and the opening of legal investigations into crimes by government agencies. The option would consist of public dialogue between Tsikhanouskaya, the Coordination Council, NAM, other political leaders, and representatives of Lukashenko, with mediation by international mediators. The aims of the talks would include:

- Lukashenko would lose his powers, which would be transferred to Tsikhanouskaya, who would become the Prime Minister of Belarus;
- all officials involved in crimes of violence or election fraud would resign;
- a new Central Election Commission would be created and a procedure for electing new president would be determined.

=== Legal Sovereignty Option ===
The Legal Sovereignty Option would be motivated by, in the words of NAM, "the fact that the only source of state power and bearer of sovereignty in Belarus is the people." Tsikhanouskaya would become president, select a transitional prime minister and cabinet, form a new Central Election Commission, and hold an election for a new president within 40–70 days.

=== Relation to United Transitional Cabinet ===
In 2022, the United Transitional Cabinet was created as a cabinet structure complementary to NAM, with Latushko as deputy head of the Cabinet, and holding responsibility within the Cabinet for the transition of power.

== Actions ==
=== Judiciary system ===
Following the beating to death of Raman Bandarenka in November 2020, NAM published data obtained from internal reports of the Belarusian Ministry of Internal Affairs, according to which 25,800 people had been detained between 9 August and 9 November 2020. The data excluded the 1000–1500 detentions of the 8 November march. Most (24,000) of the detentions are for "illegal gatherings and mass disturbances", risking two to fifteen years' imprisonment. The report also listed 4000 complaints of torture or other legal violations by security forces, none of which had been processed.

NAM aims to manage the documentation for legal actions for those "responsible for terror". Tsikhanouskaya called for the arrest of de facto president Aleksander Lukashenko, attributing to him "responsibility for terror and torture". She stated that anyone involved in detaining Lukashenko would receive an amnesty.

== See also ==
- Government in exile
- Rada of the Belarusian Democratic Republic
- United Transitional Cabinet
