= Kovalkov =

Kovalkov/Kovalkova is a Russian-language surname. Notable people with the surname include:

- Olga Kovalkova (born 1984), Belarusian activist
