= Liliya Vlasova =

Belarusian lawyer and pro-democracy activist

- Лілія Уласава; Лилия Власова
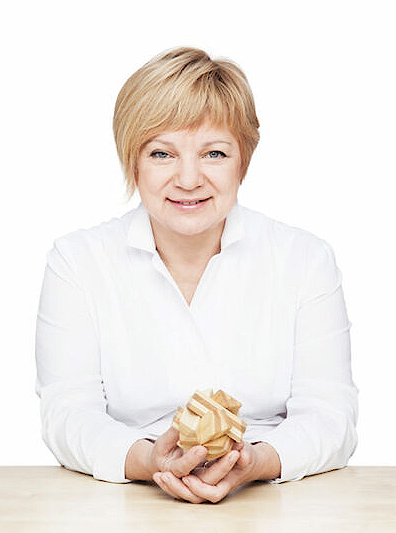
- Education: Belarusian State University, Saint Petersburg State University
- Occupation: Lawyer
- Known for: Member of the presidium of the Coordination Council of Belarus

Liliya Vladimirovna Vlasova (born 26 May 1953; Russian: Лилия Владимировна Власова; Belarusian: Лілія Уладзіміраўна Уласава) is a Belarusian lawyer well-known as a legal mediator. In August 2020, she became a member of the presidium of the Coordination Council that aims to coordinate a transition of political power in Belarus in the context of the 2020 Belarusian protests and the 2020 Belarusian presidential election. Vlasova was detained by Belarusian authorities on 31 August. She was shifted to house arrest on 16 October 2020 and fully released, with all charges dropped, on 24 October 2020.

== Education ==
Vlasova obtained an undergraduate legal degree at Belarusian State University and a PhD in law at St Petersburg University.

== Legal career ==
In 1990, Vlasova and Natalia Kozyrenko created one of the first private law firms in Belarus following the fall of the Soviet Union. The firm was first named Law Laboratory, and in 1996 was renamed as Vlasova & Partners. In 2007, Vlasova's firm was merged with Mikhel & Partners and in 2013 took the name VMP Vlasova Mikhel & Partners.

In 2011, Vlasova started her firm's bureau of legal mediation, for which she became well-known in Belarus. She created the Centre of mediation and negotiation in Minsk in 2012. The St Petersburg Mediators League awarded Vlasova the status of "best mediator of the year" in 2012. Vlasova is a mediation expert of the International Development Law Organization and the European Bank for Reconstruction and Development.

== 2020 election protests ==
During the phase of the 2020 Belarusian protests that followed the 2020 Belarusian presidential election, Vlasova joined the presidium of the Belarusian Coordination Council on 19 August. This body aims for a transition of power from president Alexander Lukashenko, whose claim to have won the election is disputed.

The following day, Prosecutor-General Alexander Konyuk initiated criminal proceedings against the members of the Coordination Council under Article 361 of the Belarusian Criminal Code, on the grounds of attempting to seize state power and harming national security.

On 31 August, Vlasova was detained by OMON. She was visible in a video of a meeting between Lukashenko and his imprisoned opponents that was broadcast on 10 October 2020. She was released from the pre-trial detention centre on 16 October 2020, but put under house arrest. On 24 October all charges were dropped and her case was closed.
