= Belarus Free Trade Union =

Trade union confederation in Belarus

SPB
- Belarus Free Trade Union
- Founded: 1991
- Dissolved: 2022
- Headquarters: Minsk, Belarus
- Location: Belarus
- Key people: Gennady Bykov, president

The Belarus Free Trade Union (SPB) was a trade union centre in Belarus. Its headquarters are located in Minsk. In October 2020, during the 2020 Belarusian protests, SPB was classified as "independent" of the government by Marina Vorobei of ProfSoyuz Online, a working group for independent trade union organising supported by the Coordination Council aiming at a transition of political power from Aleksander Lukashenko.

In July 2022, the Supreme Court of Belarus dissolved all the affiliated unions of the Belarusian Congress of Democratic Trade Unions, including the SPB, and the Congress itself, ostensibly for involvement in 'destructive activity' and 'disseminating extremist content'.
