= Andrei Ostapovich =

- Born: 1993
- Occupation: Police officer
- Known for: resignation from the Belarusian police; senior role in National Anti-crisis Management

Andrei Ostapovich (Russian: Андрей Остапович, Belarusian: Андрэй Астаповіч) is a former Belarusian police investigator who publicly resigned during the 2020 Belarusian protests, following the disputed 2020 Belarusian presidential election, in response to police violence that he called "criminal". He arrived in Poland on 3 September 2020 and sought political asylum. Ostapovich is a representative of the National Anti-crisis Management, which aims to constitute a transitional Belarusian shadow government.

== Childhood ==
Ostapovich was born in 1993 (age 31–32). Firemen and paramedics were impressed when Ostapovich, aged 15, saved a young boy from drowning in a lake. He graduated from a five-year study program in law and forensics at the Ministry of the Interior Academy of the Republic of Belarus.

== Police career to 2020 ==
Ostapovich was an official of the Investigative Committee of Belarus. He became well known after catching a "notorious pedophile" and investigating complex murder cases. He described the job as "exciting" when "suspects proved elusive". He stated that there was little political interference in his work.

Ostapovich stated that Belarusian police departments typically included "sinks used to wash away blood – the floor can get soaked with blood. ... after doing horrible things to people they'd sit with their mates and chat and laugh ... it looked like pure sadism to me. I know they enjoyed it, the excitement and the adrenaline."

== 2020 Belarusian crisis ==
=== Resignation and escape from Belarus ===
Following the disputed 2020 Belarusian presidential election and 2020 Belarusian protests in August 2020, Ostapovich resigned from the Belarusian police, stating that he refused to enforce criminal orders and calling on citizens to oppose Alexander Lukashenko, who claimed to have won the election. Ostapovich stated later, "I saw with my own eyes the lawlessness of the police and total disregard for the rule of law. I knew I wasn't going to take part in the crackdown..." He stated in his five-page resignation letter that riot police "were the only people who provoked violence" and that they carried out "criminal orders". Ostapovich posted a photograph of his resignation letter on Instagram. The post went viral.

Ostapovich left Belarus, going to Moscow. He drove to the Latvian border. Russian border police refused to let him cross due to COVID-19 pandemic restrictions. Latvians recommended that he apply for a visa in Pskov in Russia, which he did. While waiting for a visa, he was detained by Russian authorities on 21 August. After one night under detention, he was met by security forces that appeared to be FSB. He was blindfolded, put into a van and handcuffed to a kettlebell (or dumbbell). Ostapovich worried that he would be thrown in a river. Several hours later, Ostapovich was released without a blindfold in an area that the masked men said was on the border with Vitebsk Region in Belarus and informed that he was banned from entering Russia for five years.

Ostapovich ran into a forest to avoid Belarusian security. He threw away three mobile phones to avoid being located. He spent five days near the same location, surviving on chocolate bars and avoiding Belarusian police searching for him. After he felt the situation had "calmed down", he walked, in his estimate, about 70 km per day, arriving in Poland on 3 September. Incidents during his journey westward included falling into a swamp down to his waist and using his torch to frighten off wild boar, a "huge beast with tusks".

=== Transitionary government ===
Ostapovich applied for political asylum in Poland. As of December 2020, Ostapovich held a senior role in the National Anti-crisis Management, a shadow government proposed to coordinate administrative aspects of the transition of power from Lukashenko.

=== Sentence in Belarus ===
On February 15, 2024, Ostapovich was sentenced to 11 years in prison in absentia. Five other BYPOL founders received lengthy prison terms on the same day.
