= Coordination Council (Belarus) =

Representative body of the Belarusian democratic forces, formed in 2020

Coordination Council: Каардынацыйная рада (Belarusian); Координационный совет (Russian)

Type
- Type: Unicameral

History
- Established: 14 August 2020
- Preceded by: National Assembly of Belarus (claimed)

Leadership
- Speaker: Artsiom Brukhan, Coalition of Pavel Latushka and the Movement "For Freedom" since 20 June 2026
- First Vice-Speaker: Anatol Mikhnavets, Volya since 1 July 2026
- Second Vice-Speaker: Evgeny Andreichyk, Nastup since 3 July 2026
- Head of Secretariat: Aliaksei Kiryenka since 10 September 2026

Structure
- Seats: 80
- Political groups: Coalition of Pavel Latushka and the Movement "For Freedom" (34); European Choice (11); Volya (8); Nastup (8); United Civic Platform (6); Stop Being Afraid (5); Your Voice (4); Belarusians of Action (4)

Elections
- Voting system: Party-list proportional representation, online voting
- Last election: 11–19 May 2026
- Next election: 2028

Website
- rada.vision

The Coordination Council (Belarusian: Каардынацыйная рада, romanized: Kaardynacyjnaja rada; Russian: Координационный совет, romanized: Koordinatsionnyy sovet), originally the Coordination Council for the Transfer of Power, is the representative body of the Belarusian democratic forces. It was formed in Minsk in August 2020, during the protests that followed the disputed 2020 Belarusian presidential election, on the initiative of presidential candidate Sviatlana Tsikhanouskaya, who had been forced to leave Belarus for Lithuania on 11 August. Tsikhanouskaya herself has never been a member of the Council; its initial membership was assembled in Minsk by her representative Volha Kavalkova and lawyer Maxim Znak, and the Council was led by a seven-member presidium elected on 19 August 2020. Within a month, six of the seven presidium members had been detained, forced into exile or expelled from the country, and the Council's executive secretary and press secretary were forcibly taken across the Ukrainian border.

In 2022–2023 the Council was reorganised into a larger body of delegates from civil-society organisations, with a speaker elected in March 2023. Since 2024 it has been elected directly by Belarusian citizens by online vote for a two-year term: 6,723 voters took part in the May 2024 election and 2,113 in the May 2026 election, in which the coalition of Pavel Latushko and the Movement "For Freedom" won 34 of the 80 seats. The Council's speaker since May 2025 is Artsiom Brukhan.

On 20 August 2020 US Secretary of State Mike Pompeo urged the Belarusian government to engage with Belarusian society "including through the newly established Coordination Council", and in December 2020 the United States Congress passed the Belarus Democracy, Human Rights, and Sovereignty Act of 2020, which made it US policy to recognise the Council as a legitimate institution for a dialogue on a peaceful transfer of power. The European Parliament welcomed the Council in September 2020 as "the interim representation of the people demanding democratic change in Belarus", and the Lithuanian Seimas described it as the legitimate representative of the Belarusian people. In January 2025 the Senate of Poland declared that it treats the Council as the Belarusian parliament in exile, and a delegation of the Council took part for the first time in a session of the Parliamentary Assembly of the Council of Europe. The Belarusian authorities opened a criminal case against the Council's founders in August 2020 and designated it an "extremist formation" in January 2023.

== Creation ==
The creation of the Coordination Council was announced on 14 August 2020 in a video address by Tsikhanouskaya, who had left Belarus for Lithuania three days earlier. In the address she said that she had won the 9 August election, called on the international community to help organise a dialogue with the Belarusian authorities, and stated that applications from those wishing to join the Council would be collected by her representative Volha Kavalkova and lawyer Maksim Znak. A first list of 35 members was published on 17 August and expanded to 51 the next day.

On 18 August the Council held its first meeting and press conference in Minsk, at which Kavalkova, Znak, Maria Kalesnikava, Pavel Latushko and Sergei Dylevsky presented its aims: new elections and a peaceful transfer of power. Kavalkova described the Council as "the single representative body of Belarusian society" and said that it did not seek to take power unconstitutionally. On 19 August the Council elected a seven-member presidium and adopted a resolution with three demands: an end to violence and political persecution, the release of political prisoners, and the annulment of the 9 August election with a new vote under international standards. Tsikhanouskaya did not become a member of the Council. On the same day Lukashenko called the Council's members "outright Nazis", and former presidential contender Valery Tsepkalo complained that he had not been invited. On 20 August Prosecutor-General Alexander Konyuk opened criminal proceedings under Article 361 of the Criminal Code, alleging that the Council aimed at "seizure of state power"; presidium members Dylevsky and Znak were summoned for questioning the following day.

On 21 August, Tsikhanouskaya's lawyer Znak filed a formal protest concerning the presidential election with the Supreme Court of Belarus. Znak said that "A complaint has been submitted. A decision on when to start proceedings is due within three days." On 24 August, presidium members Dylevsky and Kovalkova were detained by OMON officers whilst attempting to support a wildcat strike at the Minsk Tractor Works factory. Presidium members Vlasova, Latushko, Alexievich, and Kolesnikova were also summoned for questioning. Both Kovalkova and Dylevsky were sentenced to 10 days' imprisonment the following day.

On 26 August, Ivonka Survilla, President of the Rada of the Belarusian People's Republic, expressed her support for Tsikhanouskaya. On 31 August, presidium member Vlasova was detained by the OMON. On 5 September, presidium member Kovalkova chose to leave Belarus rather than remain in detention over the Section 361 charges. On 7 September, presidium member Kolesnikova was detained by unidentified masked men in Minsk.

On 9 September 2020, the only member of the presidium not yet arrested or missing was Nobel Prize in Literature laureate Svetlana Alexievich. However, there were reports from Belarusian journalists that unknown men were knocking at the doors of her home. As of 9 August 2020, she was under round-the-clock guard by diplomats for several European countries, including ambassadors from Poland and Lithuania.

In September 2020, Lithuania, became the only sovereign state to recognize the Coordination Council for the Transfer of Power as the only legitimate representatives of the Belarusian people.

At a press conference in Poland, council member Pavel Latushko condemned the situation in Belarus, claiming that 10,000 people were subject to misconduct and imprisonment orchestrated by the security forces. He stated that 450 people were tortured, and protesters were put into jail on fake charges. Latushko and Olga Kovalkova invited the OSCE and United Nations to send observers to Belarus to assess the situation.

== Convocations ==
=== First Convocation (2020–2022) ===
Initially, the Council included about 70 members.

The Council elected a 7-member presidium on 19 August 2020. The members of the presidium were:

- Sviatlana Alexievich (Nobel Laureate in Literature)
- Sergei Dylevsky, leader of Minsk Tractor Works (MTZ) strike committee)
- Maria Kalesnikava, head of Viktar Babaryka's campaign
- Olga Kovalkova, Belarusian Christian Democracy party co-chair and representative of Sviatlana Tsikhanouskaya
- Pavel Latushko, former Minister of Culture; Latushko announced that he had quit the council in late February 2023.
- Liliya Vlasova (mediator and lawyer)
- Maxim Znak, lawyer, member of Viktar Babaryka's headquarters

Three people were added to the presidium later:

- Andrei Bastunets, journalist, chair of the Belarusian Association of Journalists
- Ales Bialiatski, human rights defender, chair of the Viasna Human Rights Centre
- Maksim Bogretsov, Vice President of EPAM Systems

The Council's day-to-day work was run by a secretariat headed by executive secretary Ivan Kravtsov, a coordinator of Viktar Babaryka's election campaign; Anton Radniankou served as press secretary. On the night of 7–8 September 2020 Kravtsov and Radniankou, together with presidium member Maria Kalesnikava, were taken by security officers to the Belarusian–Ukrainian border. The two men crossed into Ukraine, where they gave a press conference in Kyiv; Kalesnikava tore up her passport, refused to leave the country and was detained.

On 10 October 2020 Lukashenko met eleven detainees in the KGB pre-trial detention centre in Minsk, among them Babaryka and presidium members Liliya Vlasova and Maxim Znak; the participants agreed not to disclose the content of the meeting, and Council members Pavel Latushko and Maksim Bahratsou urged Belarusians not to trust Lukashenko or abandon the Council's demands. Vlasova was released to house arrest several days later. On 6 September 2021 a court in Minsk sentenced Kalesnikava to 11 years and Znak to 10 years in prison in a closed trial on charges of conspiracy to seize power, creating an extremist organisation and calls for actions damaging national security.

==== Presidium members: detentions and exile ====
Name	Detention in 2020	Left Belarus	Status (September 2026)
Alexievich	—	28 September 2020	In exile (Germany)
Dyleuski	24 August – 17 September 2020	October 2020	In exile (Poland); sentenced in absentia to 12 years on 6 March 2023
Kalesnikava	7 September 2020	13 December 2025 (expelled)	In exile (Germany); Sentenced to 11 years on 6 September 2021; released on 13 December 2025 and taken to Ukraine
Kavalkova	24 August – 5 September 2020	5 September 2020 (expelled to Poland)	In exile (Poland); sentenced in absentia to 12 years on 6 March 2023
Latushko	—	2 September 2020	In exile (Poland); sentenced in absentia to 18 years on 6 March 2023
Vlasova	31 August – 24 October 2020	—	Released to house arrest in October 2020
Znak	9 September 2020	13 December 2025 (expelled)	In exile (Poland);Sentenced to 10 years on 6 September 2021; released on 13 December 2025 and taken to Ukraine

=== Second convocation (2022–2024) ===
Valery Sakhashchyk, the Cabinet's Representative for Defence and National Security, reporting to the Council's hearings, Warsaw, 2 August 2023

On 9 August 2022, at the "New Belarus" conference in Vilnius at which the United Transitional Cabinet was announced, the Council adopted a decision to reorganise itself within the new configuration of the democratic forces, with the tasks of drafting programme and strategy documents, organising public debate, international cooperation and preparing concepts for the country's development. By February 2023 the reformed Council consisted of 22 members of the previous composition, 73 delegates from civil-society organisations and 15 self-nominated members. At its first session on 16 February 2023 the Council debated draft rules of procedure, including a proposal to give it the right to pass a vote of no confidence in the Cabinet, which the Cabinet's representative Valery Kavaleuski opposed. On 25 February 2023 Pavel Latushko announced that he was leaving the Council, objecting to discussion within it of a possible dialogue with the Lukashenko government and of easing sanctions.

On 13 March 2023 the Council elected political scientist Andrei Yahorau as its first speaker, in the third round of voting, and Alena Zhyvahlod, leader of the Honest People initiative, as vice-speaker, both for a one-year term. The second convocation held hearings on the Cabinet's representatives: in August 2023 it heard their reports before the "New Belarus" conference and recommended extending their mandates, and on 6 August 2023 it declined to approve Aliaksandr Azarau as Representative for the Restoration of Law and Order (11 votes in favour, 35 against, 30 abstentions), after which Tsikhanouskaya removed him from the post. In January 2023 the Belarusian Ministry of Internal Affairs designated the Council an "extremist formation", and in November 2023 more than 130 searches were carried out in Belarus at the homes of Council members and their relatives.

=== Third Convocation: First Coordination Council Election (2024–2026) ===
Seats by list after the May 2024 election Latushko's Team and the Movement "For Freedom" (28) Prakopyeu–Yahorau Bloc (13) Independent Belarusians (8) European Choice (8) Youth Offensive (8) Our Cause / Belarusian Christian Democracy (6) Volya (6) Stop Being Afraid (3)

In May 2024, a direct election was held for 80 seats on the Council. On 28 May 2024, the preliminary results of the elections to the Coordination Council's third composition were announced. The elections were held electronically from 25 to 27 May, verified through Belarusian passports. Altogether 6,723 voters participated in the election.

There were about 280 candidates, grouped in twelve electoral lists. The electoral lists had very similar goals to one another – restoring democracy and the rule of law in Belarus and preserving Belarusian independence, but differed regarding the relative priorities for "political, military, legal, international law, [or] economic means" of achieving the goals.

The numbers of seats allocated per list as a result of the May 2024 election were:

- Latushko's Team and the Movement "For Freedom": 28 (35,07 %)
- Prokopev-Yahorau Bloc: 13 (15,62 %)
- Independent Belarusians: 8 (9,16 %)
- European Choice: 8 (9 %)
- Youth Offensive: 8 (8,89 %)
- Our Cause/Belarusian Christian Democracy: 6 (7,27 %)
- Volya Bloc: 6 (6,43 %)
- Stop Being Afraid!: 3 (3,36 %)
- Vote of the Diaspora - Unity across Borders: 0 (2,74 %)
- Solidarity: 0 (1,55 %)
- Country for Life: 0 (0,91 %)

The Law and Order list of Aliaksandr Azarau was excluded prior to the vote for having violated the electoral rules. In the eleven non-excluded lists, there were 234 candidates.

On 11 July 2024 the delegates elected Anzhalika Melnikava of Latushko's list as speaker and Stanislava Hlinik of European Choice as vice-speaker; the Prakopyeu–Yahorau bloc declined to nominate candidates, arguing that Latushko's faction was subordinating the Council to Tsikhanouskaya's Office and the Cabinet. On 20 July 2024 Ivan Kravtsov was elected head of the secretariat for a third consecutive term.

The election organisers were criticised for providing too little information about the election in independent media and for providing information too late, just a few days before the election.

In March 2025 Melnikava disappeared; vice-speaker Hlinik acted as speaker until 14 May 2025, when the Council elected Artsiom Brukhan of Latushko's faction as speaker with 50 of 69 votes cast. The Council then amended its statute to create a second vice-speaker post: Lizaveta Prakopchyk was elected to it on 21 May 2025, and after Hlinik resigned in August 2025, Pavel Maryeuski was elected second vice-speaker on 25 September 2025. In July 2025 the Council formed a military commission and adopted a resolution calling for a "round table" between the democratic forces and the de facto authorities of Belarus.

=== Fourth Convocation (2026–present) ===
Seats by list after the May 2026 election Coalition of Pavel Latushka and the Movement "For Freedom" (34) European Choice (11) Volya (8) Nastup (8) United Civic Platform (6) Stop Being Afraid (5) Your Voice (4) Belarusians of Action (4)

On 20 January 2026, the election regulations for the 2026 election were announced, with proportional voting for lists of candidates ("electoral entities") and a minimum of 3% support required per list. Criteria to be an electoral entity included a gender quota of "at least 40% of persons of the underrepresented sex". In late March 2026, Uladzimir Mackievič proposed delaying the Council election to November in order to have time to run a campaign improving the political literacy of voters and candidates, "to explain to the wider public (potential voters) and candidates the meaning of representative power and the functions of a representative body". He also proposed removing quotas and halving the number of seats, and shifting to a mix between majoritarian and proportional voting. On 1 April, the electoral commission announced that there were 175 candidates for the 80 seats, and that the election would be held during 11–17 May.

In early May, the homes in Belarus of relatives of Council candidates were searched. The elections were held in May, ending on 19 May after an initial delay. The delay in voting was a result of DDOS cyberattacks, with 24 billion requests with 68 terabytes of traffic on the online voting system. Pavel Liber stated that the voting server was available for 95.2% of the 7-day voting period; 73 people were unable to vote for technical reasons.

According to the preliminary results announced on 19 May (subject to appeals), there were 2113 votes, much lower than the 6723 who voted in 2024, with the following seat allocations:

- Coalition of Pavel Latushko and the For Freedom Movement (leaders: Pavel Latushka, Yury Hubarevich): 34
- European Choice (leader: Valer Matskevich): 11
- Volya (leader: Mikita Zabuha): 8
- Nastup (leader: Lizaveta Prakopchyk): 8
- United Civic Platform (leader: Mikalai Kazlou): 6
- Enough Fear (leader: Tatsiana Martynava): 5
- Belarusians of Action (leader: Yury Ziankovich): 4
- Your Voice (leader: Andrei Kolas): 4
- Law and Order (leader: Siarhei Makar): 0

At its first session on 20 June 2026 the new convocation re-elected Artsiom Brukhan as speaker with 62 of the 66 votes cast; his opponent Andrei Kolas of Your Voice received four, and the United Civic Platform faction boycotted the vote, stating that several factions had not been properly informed of the nomination procedure. Anatol Mikhnavets of Volya was elected First Vice-Speaker on 1 July with 55 of 75 votes, and Yauhen Andreichyk of Nastup Second Vice-Speaker on 3 July with 44 votes in the second round against 35 for Pavel Maryeuski. On 10 August 2026 Ivan Kravtsov, who had headed the secretariat since 2020, stepped down and took up his mandate as a delegate; Yauhen Karaulau of Nastup served as acting head until 10 September 2026, when the Council elected Aliaksei Kiryenka, an IT specialist and long-standing member of the United Civic Party of Belarus, with 43 of 63 votes.

== Disappearance of Anzhalika Melnikava ==
In early February 2025 speaker Anzhalika Melnikava took leave from the Council's work; she left Poland on 26 February, and on 25 March her colleagues lost contact with her. The Council announced her disappearance on 28 March, and Polish authorities opened an investigation. The Council's statute commission later fixed 12 February 2025 as the date from which she had ceased to perform her duties, which under the statute set the election of a new speaker for 13 May. The President of the Parliamentary Assembly of the Council of Europe said he was "deeply alarmed" by the disappearance. In April it emerged that her former husband and daughters were in Belarus.

Acting speaker Stanislava Hlinik confirmed that Melnikava had applied to a donor on the Council's behalf for a grant of about €100,000 and had personally handled the application and the receipt of funds; on his election as speaker, Artsiom Brukhan promised to create a budget commission and to obtain a report on the finances of the second convocation. In May 2025 an investigation by The Insider, Polityka, the Belarusian Investigative Center, BYPOL and the Cyber Partisans concluded that her disappearance was connected to her relationship with an officer of the Belarusian KGB. Her whereabouts remain unknown.

== Objectives and structure ==
=== Objectives ===
The council stated that its primary goals are:

- To end the political persecution of citizens and for those responsible to be brought to justice.
- For the release of all political prisoners in Belarus.
- The annulment of the 9 August presidential election and for new elections to be conducted to international standards organised by a reconstituted central elections commission.

Council Presidium member Pavel Latushko stated that the Council does not want to radically change the course of Belarusian foreign policy, adding that it wants to maintain "friendly and profound" relations with Russia, as well as to have a good working relationship with the European Union and to act as a bridge between the east and west.

== Leadership ==
In its first convocation the Council had no speaker and was led collectively by a seven-member presidium. The posts of speaker and vice-speaker were introduced in the second convocation in 2023; a second vice-speaker post was added in 2025. Under the Council's statute the head of the secretariat may not simultaneously be a delegate.

Convocation	Speaker	Vice-speakers	Head of secretariat
I (2020–2022)	— (seven-member presidium)	—	Ivan Kravtsov (executive secretary, from August 2020)
II (2022–2024)	Andrei Yahorau (from 13 March 2023)	Alena Zhyvahlod	Ivan Kravtsov
III (2024–2026)	Anzhalika Melnikava (11 July 2024 – 2025; disappeared March 2025); Artsiom Brukhan (from 14 May 2025)	Stanislava Hlinik (July 2024 – August 2025; acting speaker March–May 2025); Lizaveta Prakopchyk (from 21 May 2025); Pavel Maryeuski (from 25 September 2025)	Ivan Kravtsov (re-elected 20 July 2024)
IV (2026–)	Artsiom Brukhan (re-elected 20 June 2026)	Anatol Mikhnavets (First), Yauhen Andreichyk (Second)	Ivan Kravtsov (until 10 August 2026); Yauhen Karaulau (acting, August–September 2026); Aliaksei Kiryenka (from 10 September 2026)

=== Members ===
An initial membership list, consisting of 35 members, was circulated on 17 August 2020 and expanded to 51 members on 18 August. The council had 59 members in its core membership group on 29 August 2020, increasing to 64 members as of 13 February 2021. In addition to the 7-member presidium, other members, as of 13 February 2021, include athlete Nadzeya Astapchuk, film director Jury Chaščavacki, civic leader Ales Bialiatski, politician Jury Hubarewicz, physicist Alexander Dabravolski, politician Andrei Egorov, Mikalai Kazlov of the United Civic Party of Belarus, Andrei Kureichik, politician Vital Rymasheuski, painter Uladzimir Tsesler, former EPAM Systems top-manager Maksim Bahratsou, independent analyst Siarhei Chaly. On 24 August 2020, the council included an "expanded" support list of 600 members. After the first Coordination Council elections in 2024, the council had 80 members.

=== Working groups ===
As of 16 October 2020, the Coordination Council included working groups on several socio-political themes:

- a trade union group ProfSoyuz Online for encouraging the creation of independent trade unions
- a women's group
- a support group for local initiatives in the districts of Belarus
- KOTOC: legal advice for interactions with and electoral participation in sub-national formal structures (oblasts, raion)
- an economic group
- a business support group
- Christian Vision
- a political prisoners and human rights group
- an education group
- a group for the Belarusian language and culture.

==== Truth commission ====
In late November 2020, the Council published a draft document for debating the creation of a truth and reconciliation commission for the purposes of transitional justice. The commission, termed a "special agency", would "consider the use of physical force, special equipment and weapons against citizens in connection with political positions" or the violation or calls for the violation of citizens' rights by public officials. The agency would only consider individual responsibility; membership of an organisation would not be grounds for prosecution. In cases in which no physical harm was involved, the accused would go through a conciliation procedure. Other cases would be prosecuted under administrative, "disciplinary," or criminal law. The showing of "effective remorse" or the lack of it would weaken or strengthen some of the financial and property penalties in the proposed legal definition of the agency's powers.

=== Factions ===
As of September 2024, the primary and fundamental form of interaction among the delegates of the Coordination Council is through factions. To enhance the efficiency of the Council's work, formalized interactions between groups of delegates can also take place through working groups and committees. A faction is a group of delegates who have come together to improve the effectiveness and efficiency of the Coordination Council in achieving its goals. The initial names, numbers, and composition of the factions correspond to the names, numbers, and composition of the electoral lists that secured seats in the Coordination Council. Delegates are free to move from one faction to another, leave a faction, or not belong to any faction. A faction may also be dissolved by a majority decision of its members. The creation of new factions or the re-establishment of dissolved factions is not permitted. A faction's name may be changed by a majority vote of its members, but no more than once every six months.

=== Representatives ===
On 31 August 2021 the Coordination Council presented a structure update that implies the election of representatives in key areas of development. Representatives of the Coordination Council should act as a liaison between international partners and national actors in certain areas, help establish professional ties, prepare analytical notes on the situation in their field, promote topics among international structures, participate in expert discussions, jointly develop support plans for certain sectors. Representatives are elected positions with a 6-month mandate. The candidates publicly present the program, which should be implemented in the next six months.

- Business and innovation economy - Tatsiana Marynich
- Eastern Partnership - Valery Matskevich
- Civil Society - Andrey Egorov
- Culture - Andrei Kureichik
- Political prisoners - Tatsiana Khomich (Maria Kalesnikava's sister)
- Human Capital Development - Olga Kovalkova
- Digital transformation - Alex Shkor
- Jurisprudence - Mikhail Kirilyuk
- Sports - Nadzeya Astapchuk

== "Extremist group" status ==
In January 2023, the Ministry of Internal Affairs of Belarus recognized the Coordination Council as an extremist organization. According to Belarusian legislation, members of extremist groups face imprisonment. Earlier, in 2021–2022, Belarusian courts recognized the Council's internet resources as extremist materials. In November 2023, more than 130 searches were conducted, and more than 145 properties were arrested during a massive raid conducted by the Belarusian criminal police against the members of the Coordination Council and their relatives. According to Belarusian human rights activists, people allegedly associated with the Coordination Council are approached with search warrants under six articles of the Criminal Code of the Republic of Belarus:

- "Treason to the state" – up to 15 years in prison;
- "Conspiracy or other actions committed to seize state power" – up to and including the death penalty;
- "Calls for actions aimed at harming the national security of the Republic of Belarus" - up to three years of imprisonment;
- "Creation of an extremist formation" – up to seven years;
- "Financing extremist activities" – up to six years in prison;
- "Promoting extremist activity" – up to six years.

On 23 January 2024, the Belarusian Investigative Committee announced that charges where brought against the Secretary of the Coordination Council Ivan Kravtsov, who has been accused of conspiracy or other actions committed to seize government power, creation of an extremist formation and other articles of the criminal code. Kravtsov headed the Council's secretariat from its formation in 2020 until August 2026.

== Relations with other opposition group structures ==
In late October 2020, the Pavel Latushko, a presidium member, created National Anti-crisis Management (NAM), that at the time was seen as a shadow government, to manage the detailed administration tasks of a peaceful transfer of power leading to the inauguration of a newly elected president. NAM published internal reports of the Belarusian Ministry of Internal Affairs, according to which 25,800 people had been detained between 9 August and 9 November 2020, and 4000 complaints of torture and other illegal actions had been lodged with the ministry and ignored.

In August 2024, the Coordination Council, the United Transitional Cabinet, Tsikhanouskaya and her administrative Office published an agreement describing principles of their respective roles, power relations, and dispute resolution procedures. Article 4.2 of the agreement states that the Coordination Council is elected democratically using proportional representation at least once every two years.

== International relations ==
=== Recognition and statements ===
On 20 August 2020 US Secretary of State Mike Pompeo urged the Belarusian government to engage Belarusian society "including through the newly established Coordination Council". On 28 August the European Union, in a statement to the OSCE Permanent Council, demanded an end to the criminal case against the Council's members, and on 7 September the EU High Representative Josep Borrell stated that the Council's members "must be protected from intimidation, forced exile, arbitrary arrest and violence".

On 10 September 2020 the Lithuanian Seimas described the Council as the only legitimate representatives of the Belarusian people. On 17 September 2020 the European Parliament adopted a resolution welcoming the Council "as an interim representation of the people demanding democratic change in Belarus", and on 21 October 2020 it recommended that the EU recognise the Council as the legitimate representative of the people demanding democratic change and freedom. In December 2020 the Sakharov Prize was awarded to the democratic opposition of Belarus, represented by the Council. The Belarus Democracy, Human Rights, and Sovereignty Act of 2020, passed by the United States Congress in December 2020, made it the policy of the United States to recognise the Council "as a legitimate institution to participate in a dialogue on a peaceful transition of power"; the 2023 and 2024 editions of the Act assign that role to the United Transitional Cabinet. Polish Prime Minister Mateusz Morawiecki referred to the Council as the right partner for the authorities to negotiate with.

On 22 January 2025 the Senate of Poland unanimously adopted a resolution on the Belarusian presidential election in which it declared its readiness to cooperate with the Coordination Council for the Transfer of Power in Belarus, "which we treat as the Belarusian parliament in exile". In October 2025 the European Parliament, in a resolution marking five years since the 2020 election, called for strengthened capacity-building for "the Office of the Elected President Sviatlana Tsikhanouskaya, the United Transitional Cabinet, the Coordination Council, and democratic political parties" and for the representation of the Belarusian democratic forces to be formalised in the parliamentary assemblies of the Council of Europe, the OSCE and NATO.

=== Parliamentary assemblies ===
In January 2025 a delegation of the Council took part for the first time in a session of the Parliamentary Assembly of the Council of Europe as part of the newly established representative delegation of the Belarusian democratic forces. The Assembly welcomed the delegation, and speaker Anzhalika Melnikava addressed the plenary during the debate on the Belarusian presidential election. The Council's delegation also participates in the Congress of Local and Regional Authorities of the Council of Europe. In November 2024 the Polish parliamentary group "For Free Belarus" agreed to develop plans for cooperation between the Polish parliament and the Council.

=== Russia ===
On 25 August 2020 a spokesperson for Russian President Vladimir Putin welcomed the Council's stated intention not to reduce ties with Russia. On 9 March 2021 the Russian ambassador to Belarus, Dmitry Mezentsev, said that the Council had asked him for a meeting, which he refused, describing its members as "people no one has ever elected".

=== Citizens' protest groups ===
On 1 November 2020, in the context of the October 2020 Polish protests, Polish citizens led by All-Poland Women's Strike created a Consultative Council that they said was inspired by the Belarusian Coordination Council.

== See also ==
- Belarusian democracy movement
- Belarusian partisan movement (2020–present)
- New Belarus passport project
- United Transitional Cabinet of Belarus
- Rada of the Belarusian Democratic Republic
