= Olga Kovalkova =

Belarusian activist (born 1984)

- Вольга Кавалькова; Ольга Ковалькова
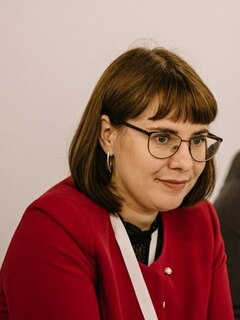
- Kovalkova in 2020
- Born: 26 January 1984 (age 42); Minsk, Byelorussian SSR, Soviet Union (now Belarus)
- Citizenship: Belarus
- Occupation: Lawyer
- Known for: Activist, dissident
- Political party: Belarusian Christian Democracy

Olga Kovalkova, also known as Volha Kavalkova (Belarusian: Вольга Аляксандраўна Кавалькова, romanized: Voĺha Aliaksandraŭna Kavaĺkova, Russian: Ольга Александровна Ковалькова; born 26 January 1984), is a Belarusian activist and a member of the presidium of the Coordination Council of Belarus that was formed by the presidential candidate Sviatlana Tsikhanouskaya to transition the political power in Belarus in the aftermath the 2020 Belarusian protests and the disputed 2020 Belarusian presidential election.

== Career ==
=== Political activity ===
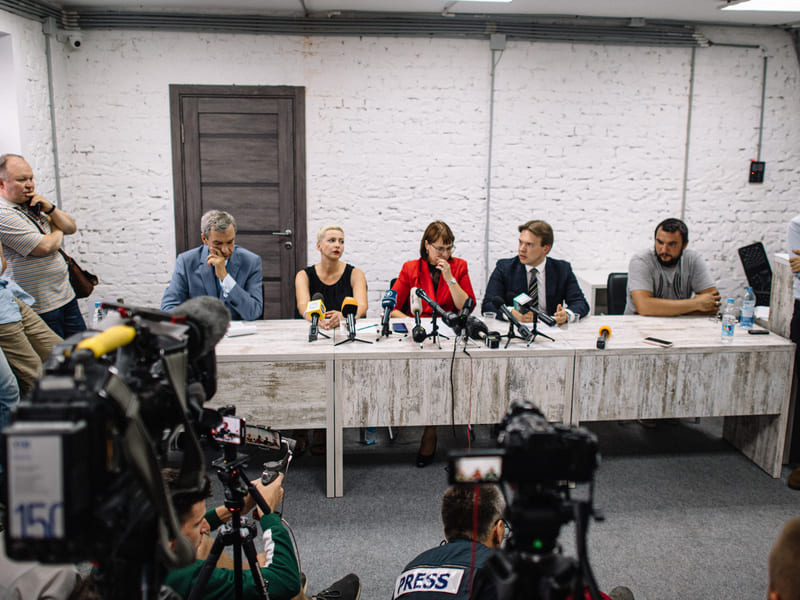
Press conference with Kovalkova

==== Belarusian Christian Democracy co-chair ====
In November 2019, Kovalkova announced her intention to run for President of Belarus at the next election. She said, "The authorities should see that there are more people who want change than those who are on the other side of the system. The opposition should have a task to unite people in a united tangible front for the authorities know that there are people who can dictate their conditions."

According to an interview from 2024, Kovalkova left the Belarusian Christian Democracy party and is not a Christian anymore.

==== Political activism ====
In February–May 2020, Olga Kovalkova participated in the opposition primaries to choose a single candidate. Scandalous deputy Kanopatskaya paid 500 euros for Kovalkova's participation in the primaries. However, the campaign failed due to Kovalkova's lack of fame in Belarus and lack of a team. She did not apply for the presidential election and did not take any part in the work of the united headquarters of the opposition in the 2020 election.

==== Post-election protests ====
In August 2020, Kovalkova joined the presidium of the Coordination Council which coordinates the transition of political power from president Alexander Lukashenko, who claims to have won the 2020 Belarusian presidential election. Kovalkova served as the representative of Sviatlana Tsikhanouskaya during the formation of the council.

On 20 August 2020, Alexander Konyuk, the Prosecutor-General of Belarus, initiated criminal proceedings against the members of the Coordination Council under Article 361 of the Belarusian Criminal Code on the grounds of attempting to seize state power and harming national security.

On 24 August 2020, Kovalkova and fellow presidium member, Sergei Dylevsky, were detained by the security services whilst attempting to support striking workers at the Minsk Tractor Works factory. Kovalkova was sentenced to 10 days imprisonment the following day.

On September 5, 2020, KGB officers took Olga Kovalka to the border with Poland, where she passed control and left Belarus. On 5 September 2020, Kovalkova had to leave for Warsaw, Poland, after her release from prison. She reported that authorities warned her of further arrests if she did not leave the country. Kovalkova was forcibly exiled by authorities from Belarus.

In March 2023, Kovalkova was convicted to 12 years in prison in absentia. Tsikhanouskaya and several other leaders of the 2020 protests were convicted in absentia on the same day.

== Awards and recognitions ==
In December 2020, Kovalkova was named among the representatives of the Democratic Belarusian opposition honored with the Sakharov Prize by the European Parliament.
