= Evgeny Andreichyk =

Belarusian civic and political activist

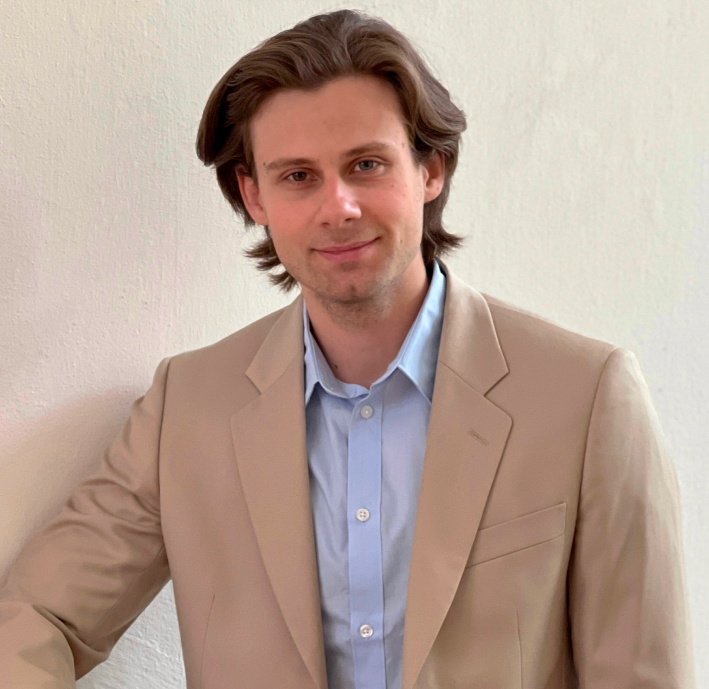
- Born: March 22, 1999 (age 27); Minsk, Belarus
- Citizenship: Belarus; Israel
- Education: University of Warsaw; Lazarski University; Coventry University

Evgeny Andreichyk (Belarusian: Яўген Ігаравіч Андрэйчык; also Yauhen Andreichyk, Yauheni Andreichyk) is a Belarusian civic and political activist. In July 2026, he was elected as the deputy speaker of the Coordination Council of Belarus. Since August 2026, he has been a member of the Belarusian democratic forces' delegation to the Parliamentary Assembly of the Council of Europe (PACE).

== Early life and education ==
Andreichyk was born in Minsk. He studied international relations and European studies at Lazarski University in Warsaw and Coventry University in the United Kingdom. He later studied a diplomacy program at the University of Warsaw. Before 2020, he worked in the information technology sector.

== Civic and political activity ==
In 2020, Andreichyk joined Voices from Belarus, a pro-democracy media organisation established during the political crisis that followed the 2020 Belarusian presidential election. He later became its editor-in-chief. He subsequently worked in communications for the Belarusian Solidarity Foundation. In 2023, he worked as an information policy adviser to the United Transitional Cabinet of Belarus.

In 2022, Andreichyk initiated a public campaign concerning the system used to book appointments at Polish visa centres in Belarus. He proposed identity verification as a way to restrict intermediaries who obtained and resold visa appointment slots.

In 2024, he was a candidate for the third convocation of the Coordination Council on the European Choice electoral list but was not elected. In December, Andreichyk announced that he was temporarily suspending his political activism and work related to Belarus.

In 2026, Andreichyk joined the Nastup electoral list for the fourth convocation of the Coordination Council and was elected as a delegate in May. In July, he was elected second deputy speaker of the fourth convocation of the Coordination Council. He received 44 votes in the second round; 79 of the council's 80 members took part in the vote.

In August 2026, the Coordination Council elected Andreichyk as a member of the Belarusian democratic forces' delegation to the Parliamentary Assembly of the Council of Europe (PACE), in the capacity of a substitute representative. The composition of the delegation was formally approved by the PACE Bureau on 28 September 2026.
