= Pavel Latushko =

Belarusian diplomat and pro-democracy activist

- Павел Латушка; Павел Латушко
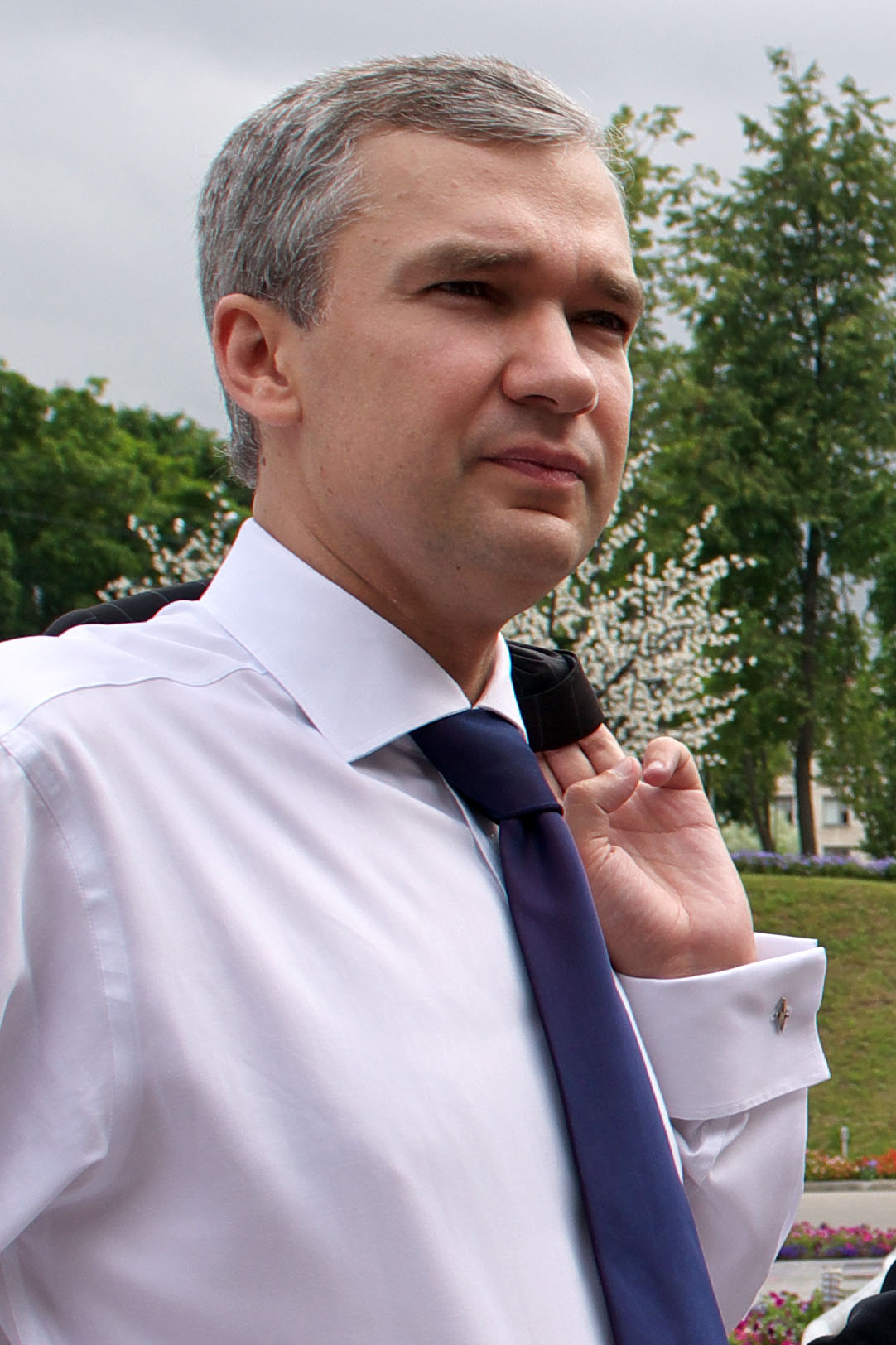
- Latushko in 2010

Head of National Anti-Crisis Management of Belarus
- Incumbent
- Assumed office 26 October 2020
- President: Sviatlana Tsikhanouskaya
- Preceded by: Position established

Minister of Culture
- In office 4 June 2009 – 16 November 2012
- President: Alexander Lukashenko
- Prime Minister: Sergei Sidorsky; Mikhail Myasnikovich
- Preceded by: Vladimir Fyodorovich Matveichuk
- Succeeded by: Boris Svetlov

Deputy Head and Representative for the Transfer of Power in the United Transitional Cabinet
- Incumbent
- Assumed office 6 August 2022
- President: Sviatlana Tsikhanouskaya
- Preceded by: Office established

Personal details
- Born: 10 February 1973 (age 53) Minsk, Belarusian SSR, Soviet Union (now Belarus)
- Citizenship: Belarusian
- Party: Latushko's Team and the Movement "For Freedom"
- Education: Belarusian State University; Minsk State Linguistic University

Pavel Pavlovich Latushko (Note: Belarusian: Павел Паўлавіч Латушка, romanized: Paviel Pawłavič Latuška, Russian: Павел Павлович Латушко, romanized: Pavel Pavlovich Latushko) (born 10 February 1973) is a Belarusian politician and former diplomat, currently a dissident. He was the Minister of Culture of the Republic of Belarus from 2009 to 2012.

In 2020, Latushko supported the Belarusian protests against Lukashenko. He became the head of the National Anti-Crisis Management, a "shadow-government-like" organisation. On August 9, 2022 Latushko became the Deputy Head and Representative for the Transfer of Power in the United Transitional Cabinet of Sviatlana Tsikhanouskaya.

In March 2023, a Belarusian court sentenced him in absentia to 18 years' imprisonment.

== Education ==
Latushko graduated from the law faculty of the Belarusian State University in 1995, and Minsk State Linguistic University in 1996.

== Diplomatic career under Lukashenko ==
From 1995 to 1996, he was the attaché of the contractual and legal department of the Ministry of Foreign Affairs of the Republic of Belarus. He then served from 1996 to 2000 as the Vice Consul, Consul of the Consulate General of the Republic of Belarus in Bialystok (Poland). Following that, he was the head of the information department and press secretary of the Belarusian Foreign Ministry from 2000 to 2002.

From 6 December 2002 to 31 October 2008, he was Ambassador Extraordinary and Plenipotentiary of the Republic of Belarus to the Republic of Poland. He then served as the Minister of Culture of the Republic of Belarus from 4 June 2009 to 16 November 2012. Since 16 November 2012, he served as Ambassador Extraordinary and Plenipotentiary of the Republic of Belarus to the French Republic, Permanent Representative of the Republic of Belarus to UNESCO. On 20 May 2013 he was appointed concurrently Ambassador Extraordinary and Plenipotentiary of the Republic of Belarus to the Kingdom of Spain and to the Portuguese Republic, and on 15 December 2016 he was also appointed concurrently Ambassador to Monaco. On 15 January 2019, he was relieved of his post as ambassador.

In March 2019, he was appointed director of the Yanka Kupala National Academic Theater.

== Criticisms ==
During the 2006 Belarusian presidential election, Pavel Latushko attracted media attention in Poland. In his role as Belarusian ambassador to Poland, Latushko took part in the program "24 hours" of the TVN24 news channel via teleconference. The host questioned him about the conduct of the election, access of opposition candidates to the media and arrests of activists. At the end of the teleconference, the operator forgot to turn off the camera. Latushko's statements later became public, "I will say this - I will never give an interview to your station again - it's a nightmare ... Your journalists are ... well ... what they did in the summer, and now they're starting again with the president ... It's just ... If I [weren't] an ambassador, I apologize and please pass it to him (the presenter), I would give it to him in the face." Latushko was summoned "on the carpet" to the Polish Foreign Ministry and recalled to Belarus for consultations. Some Polish politicians called for Latushko to be declared persona non grata.

== 2020 election protests ==
During the 2020 Belarusian protests, he supported the strike of the theater artists and spoke in favor of the resignation of Yury Karaev and Lidia Yermoshina. Because of his support, Latushko was fired on 17 August. Theatre artists applied en masse for the resignation in support of Pavel Latushko.

On 19 August, Latushko became a member of the presidium of Sviatlana Tsikhanouskaya's Coordination Council.

On 20 August, Alexander Konyuk, the Prosecutor-General of Belarus, initiated criminal proceedings against the members of the Coordination Council under Article 361 of the Belarusian Criminal Code, on the grounds of attempting to seize state power and harming national security.

In the closing days of August, Latushko moved to Poland after being questioned by authorities. "His departure came a day after Lukashenko warned that Latushko had crossed a red line and would face prosecution."

In late October 2020, Latushko became the head of National Anti-Crisis Management, a shadow government created by the Belarusian Coordination Council for the peaceful transition of power following the 2020 Belarusian presidential election.

On 9 August 2022, Sviatlana Tsikhanouskaya declared at a conference held in Vilnius, Lithuania, the declaration of the United Transitional Cabinet. Latushko is the responsible person for the transition of power in it.

In March 2023, a Belarusian court sentenced him in absentia to 18 years' imprisonment.

== Points of view ==
In October 2002 Pavel Latushko accused Russian physicist and opposition politician Boris Nemtsov of interfering in Belarusian internal affairs and supported his expulsion from Belarus. "Nemtsov's efforts to complicate the development of Belarusian–Russian relations, to slow down integration processes, his categorical disagreement with the policy of building the Union State harm not only Belarusian–Russian bilateral relations, but also the prospects of building the union".

== Ranks and classes ==
- Ambassador Extraordinary and Plenipotentiary of the 2nd class (6 December 2002).
- First-class civil servant (4 June 2009).
- Ambassador Extraordinary and Plenipotentiary (16 November 2012).

== Awards and honours ==
In September 2024, Latushko received relaunched Lech Wałęsa Solidarity Prize.

== Personal life ==
In addition to Russian and Belarusian, he speaks English and Polish. His ex-wife Natalia is married to Belarusian diplomat and statesman Maxim Ryzhenkov.
