= New Belarus passport project =

Alternative Belarusian passport

The New Belarus passport project (Note: Belarusian: Пашпарт «Новай Беларусі», romanized: Pashpart "Novay Belarusi"; Russian: Паспорт «Новой Беларуси», romanized: Pasport "Novoy Belarusi")) was initiated by the United Transitional Cabinet of Belarus (a government-in-exile) to provide legal identification for the citizens of Belarus emigrated for political reasons, in response to the decree of President Alexander Lukashenko forbidding the issuance and renewal of Belarusian passports abroad in 2023. For the oppoents of the Lukashenka regime, to return to Belarus for passport renewal means an imminent prosecution and detention.

== History ==
The exiled Belarusian opposition started discussing this idea in 2020. The Belarus opposition leader Sviatlana Tsikhanouskaya thought of it as a rather symbolic gesture. However, with the outbreak of the Russian invasion of Ukraine, in which Belarus was indirectly, but considerably involved, the treatment of the idea became more serious. Tsikhanouskaya first put forth this idea before the European Union and European countries in March 2023 and seeks support from them in this endeavor.

After the resignation of Valery Kavaleuski from the United Transitional Cabinet and the scandal in May 2024 around the contractor who was supposed to print the document, Lithuanian citizen Marius Gudelaitis began to oversee the New Belarus passport. The application process for the new passport was launched on 26 January 2025. The passport would be printed in-house by the Belarus Passport Center offices in Vilnius and other locations, and would cost 97 EUR. It also uses NFC and biometric technology, and is designed to be ICAO standard-compliant. Among the first recipients of the passport were lawyer and dissident Ales Michalevic (passport No. 321) and blogger Siarhei Tsikhanouski. On 31 December 2025, the first posthumous passport was issued to Larysa Hienijuš, who during her lifetime had refused Soviet citizenship. The document was received by her grandson Mikhail.

As of early February 2026, Nasha Niva reported that about 500 people had received their New Belarus passports. Concerning its legal status, Sviatlana Tsikhanouskaya stated that "the passport has not yet received formal recognition, but there are cases where it has helped people in the legalization process". She added: "We assume that the more passports are issued, the greater the chances of recognition". In April 2026, a Belarusian man was acquitted and had his international protection status re-instated by the Polish Foreigners' Affairs Office after it was initially revoked in February due to him using a New Belarus passport in applying for a new residence permit, since the authorities assumed that he received a new Belarusian government-issued (blue) passport. In an interview in February 2025, the deputy director of the Belarus Passport Center said that the New Belarus passport is unofficially accepted by the State Migration Service of Ukraine.

== Issues ==
While there are a variety travel documents issued by some states, such as laissez-passer, they cannot resolve a number of legal services. The authorities in Belarus also announced in September 2023 that Belarusian passports would no longer be issued or renewed in Belarusian embassies and consulates abroad. Therefore, the full-fledged passport is a rather pressing issue for the Belarusian opposition in exile.

The two fundamental issues to be resolved are the legal recognition and international security standards for the document, of which the legal recognition is the most complex issue. A related issue is that passports have to have a unique three-letter country code. There is a preliminary agreement with an undisclosed country that it would share its code.

Businessman Viktar Shevtsou (Viktor Shevtsov), an oligarch dubbed "Lukashenko's wallet", was indirectly connected with the project via Lithuanian passport printing companies called Garsų Pasaulis and GP Holographics. Garsų Pasaulis, selected to print the passports, claimed following the outbreak of the war, they severed all ties with him. However, he retains shares of related company GP Holographics. Both companies share the same address, administrator and accountant. Garsų Pasaulis also produces passports for Lithuania, who is now investigating the ties between GP and Shevtsov and whether the company should still be allowed to produce the passports, given the sanctions. Prime Minister of Lithuania Ingrida Šimonytė said that after the investigation was complete, a decision would be made regarding whether GP should be allowed to continue printing the passports. After the Shetsov case, the process in developing the new passport was taken over by Lithuanian citizen Marius Gudelaitis.

The fact that the cover of the new passport uses the Pahonia symbol caused sharp criticism among Lithuanian nationalists, who consider it a misappropriation of Lithuanian Vytis, especially in the context of the Litvinism dispute. They sent an open letter to the Seimas and the President of Lithuania to this end, calling against the official recognition of the new Belarus passport. Accordingly, in January 2025 the Seimas concluded that this passport is a symbolic document, not to be officially accepted in Lithuania.

== See also ==
- Nansen passport
