= Margarita Levchuk =

Belarusian opera singer

- Маргарыта Ляўчук
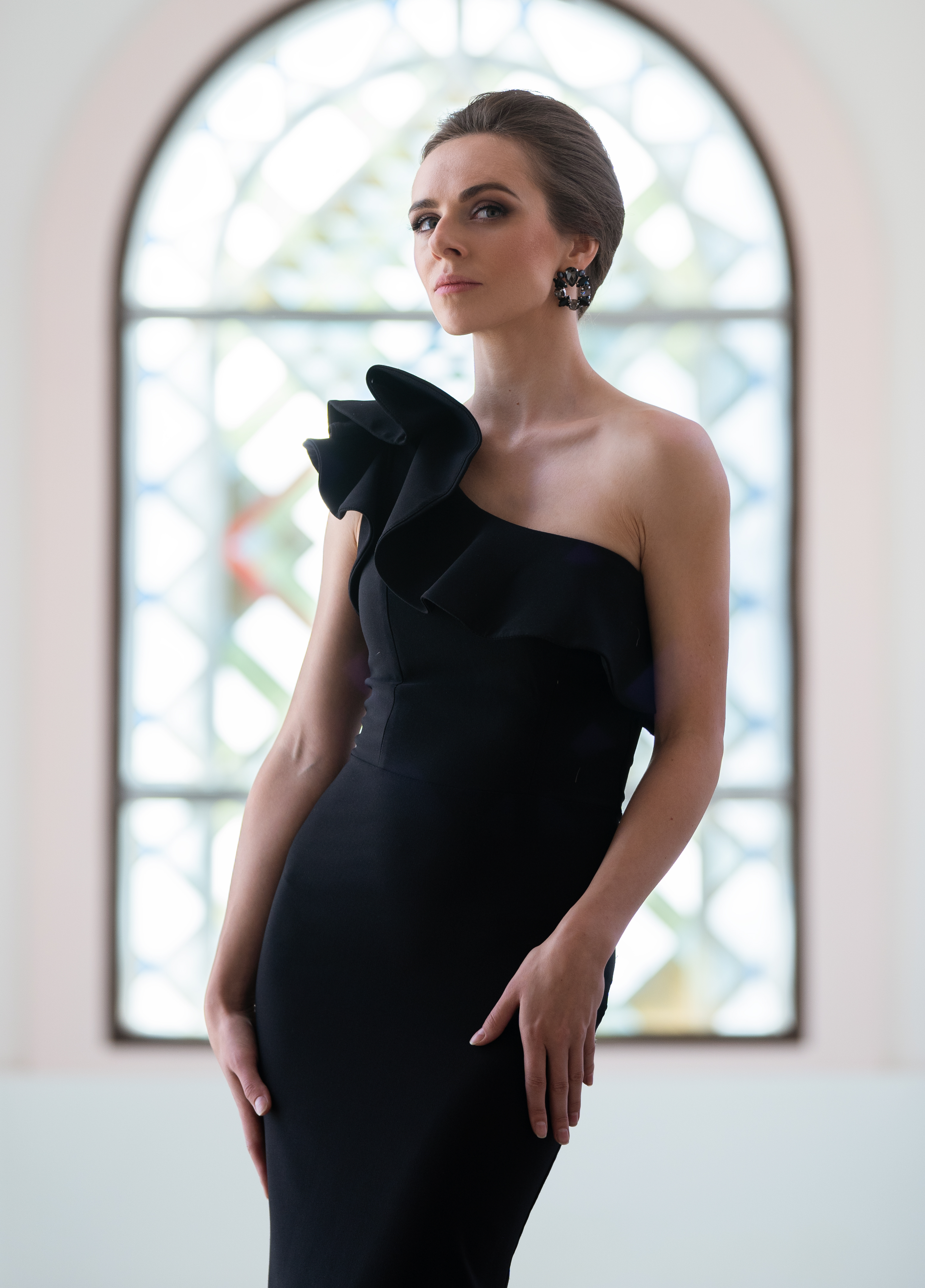
- Levchuk in 2021
- Born: 16 April 1990 (age 36); Stradzieč, Brest Region, Byelorussian SSR
- Occupation: Opera singer

Margarita Levchuk (Belarusian Маргарыта Аляксандраўна Ляўчук, Marharyta Liauchuk; born 16 April 1990) is a Belarusian opera singer (soprano). She is a soloist of the Musical House "Classics"; a soloist of the National Opera and Ballet of Belarus; the finalist of the project on the TV channel "Russia-K" "Big Opera" (2017). Levchuk is one of the most famous opera singers in Belarus.

== Musical career ==
Levchuk graduated from the Ryhor Shyrma Brest College of Music with a degree in choral conducting. In 2016, she graduated from the Belarusian State Academy of Music.

Since 2012, she has been a soloist in the Musical House "Classics." From 2016 to 2020, she was a soloist at the National Opera and Ballet of Belarus.

Levchuk performs in performances and concerts in Belarus, Russia, Lithuania, Poland, France, and Germany. As a guest artist, she appears on the stages of leading European opera houses.

== Politics ==
In late 2020, Levchuk was selected as the person responsible for culture and national heritage in National Anti-crisis Management, a shadow government created for Belarus during the 2020 Belarusian protests.

On June 24, 2024, it became known that the Brest Regional Court sentenced Levchuk in absentia to several years in prison and a fine.

== Opera ==
- Mozart's "The Magic Flute" - Queen of the Night
- "Rigoletto" Verdi - Gilda
- "The Marriage of Figaro" by Mozart - Barbarina
- "La Traviata" by Verdi - Violetta
