= Sergei Tikhanovsky =

Belarusian YouTuber and opposition activist (born 1978)

- Сяргей Ціханоўскі; Сергей Тихановский
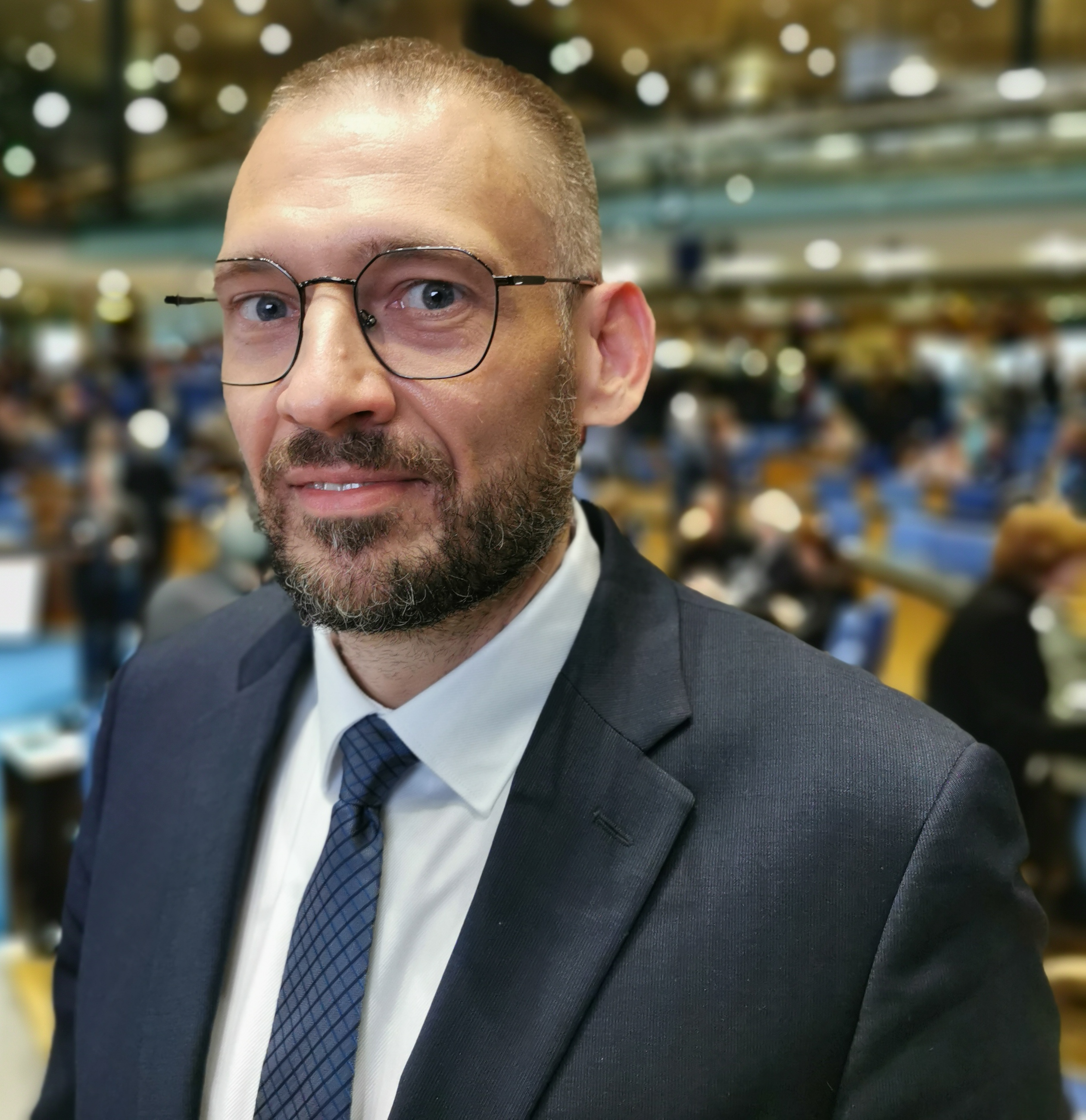
- Tikhanovsky in Bonn, 2025
- Born: Sergei Leonidovich Tikhanovsky; 18 August 1978 (age 48); Horki, Mogilev Region, Byelorussian SSR, Soviet Union (now Belarus)
- Occupations: YouTuber; politician
- Spouse: Sviatlana Tsikhanouskaya (m. 2004)

YouTube information
- Channel: stranazhizni
- Years active: 2019–present
- Genres: Politics; activism; business; entrepreneurship
- Subscribers: 231 thousand
- Views: 131 million
- Last updated: April 23, 2026

Sergei Leonidovich Tikhanovsky (Note: Russian: Серге́й Леони́дович Тихано́вский; Belarusian: Сярге́й Леані́давіч Ціхано́ўскі, romanized: Syarhey Leanidavich Tsikhanouski; also transliterated as Siarhei Tsikhanouski; Łacinka: Siarhiej Leanidavič Cichanoŭski) (born 18 August 1978) is a Belarusian YouTuber, video blogger, businessman, opposition leader and pro-democracy activist. He is primarily known for his activism against the government of Belarus's long-serving president, Alexander Lukashenko. In May 2020, he announced his intention of running for the 2020 presidential election, but he was arrested two days after the announcement, and his wife Sviatlana Tsikhanouskaya then ran in place of him as the main rival to Lukashenko in the contested election. On 21 June 2025, after five years of solitary confinement, Tsikhanouski was released from prison after US representative Keith Kellogg's visit to Belarus.

== Early life and education ==
Sergei Leonidovich Tikhanovsky was born in Horki, Mogilev Region, Byelorussian SSR (now Belarus), and raised in Gomel.

He studied at a physical and mathematical gymnasium, then graduated from the Faculty of Philology of the Francisk Skorina Gomel State University.

Tikhanovsky opened nightclubs in Gomel and Mazyr and organized concerts, and became engaged in video production, advertising, and music videos.

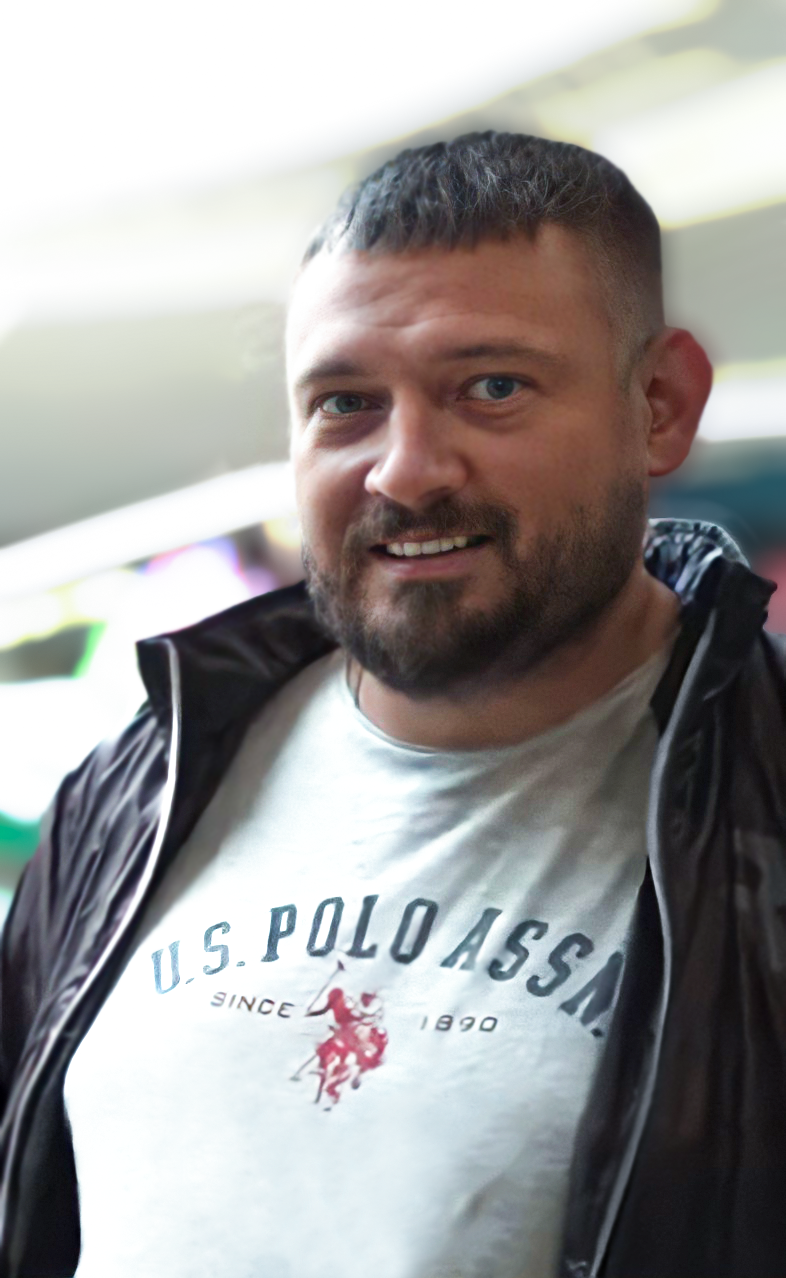
Tikhanovsky in 2019

== YouTube channel ==
Tikhanovsky says he became a blogger almost by accident. He organized a farmstead near Gomel and faced bureaucratic hurdles from local, regional, and national officials, then spoke of his difficulties with journalists.

The YouTube channel "Country for Life" (Страна для жизни) was launched in 2019. The channel is dedicated to stories of ordinary Belarusians and real cases of entrepreneurs "which will help to build a country for life". Tikhanovsky shoots a video on social and political topics and talks about the problems of people – mainly in the Belarusian regions.

Together with his team in a car with the logo "Real News", Tikhanovsky spent more than a month driving around Belarus and interviewing subscribers, who told him about the problems in the city and the country on camera. The most popular video on the channel (almost one million views as of 30 May 2020) is the story of a woman from the town of Hlybokaye about her life and her attitude toward Lukashenko. Tikhanovsky's YouTube channel also features video interviews with opposition politicians and businessmen. On trips around Belarus, Sergei Tikhanovsky was constantly followed by cars with people monitoring him, presumably employees of the Belarusian special services.

By May 2020, Tikhanovsky's YouTube channel had garnered 140,000 subscribers; by mid-July 2020, it had reached 243,000 subscribers, more than 12 times the number of subscribers to the state-run Belarus 24 satellite channel. Independent anti-Lukashenko bloggers (including Tikhanovsky) were seen by the government as a major threat to its rule as an alternative to state-controlled media, and many were targeted by the authorities.

== Political activity ==
=== 2019 Belarusian anti-Russian protests ===
Tikhanovsky was one of the most prominent opposition leaders during the protests that began in December 2019 and continued until January 2020. Demonstrations were directed against the Belarusian-Russian integration, and Tikhanovsky demanded to preserve Belarusian independence.

=== Anti-parade in Babruysk ===
On 9 May 2020, dozens of supporters of Sergei Tikhanovsky held an "Anti-parade" in Babruysk to express their disagreement with the Victory Day Parade in Minsk during the COVID-19 pandemic. The protest parade took the form of a protest motor rally. Police detained about 15 people after the motor rally. Tikhanovsky was detained.

=== 2020 election and protests ===
On 7 May 2020, Sergei Tikhanovsky announced on his YouTube channel that he intended to become a candidate for President of Belarus, challenging Alexander Lukashenko and his decades long rule. Prior to this event, on 6 May, he was detained by the Belarusian militsiya (police) in the vicinity of Mogilev; the police threatened to break the glass of Tikhanovsky's car, and failed to present a certificate to confirm that they were police officers. Prior to that, a crowd of Tikhanovsky's supporters in Mogilev released a member of Tikhanovsky's team from the police. A day later, allies of Tikhanovsky were arrested, including a blogger from Slutsk, Uladzimier Niaronski. The vans of Tikhanovsky's team including Niaronski were chased by road police and two vans with members of the AMAP special police forces.

After the arrests, Tikhanovsky's supporters held a series of protests throughout Belarus. According to the Radio Liberty, 20 to 30 people were detained in Gomel, the home town of Tikhanovsky. Viasna Human Rights Centre reports that at least 19 people who supported Tikhanovsky were brutally detained in Minsk.

After his arrest, Tikhanovsky was held at a temporary detention center in Gomel, nominally due to participation in the rally in Minsk on 19 December 2019 against the integration of Belarus with Russia. He was ultimately sentenced to 15 days' imprisonment: 15 days of arrest for "participating in an unauthorized protest action" in December 2019, and 30 days for meeting subscribers to his YouTube channel in Orsha and Brest. After his detention, Tikhanovsky announced on his YouTube channel that he intended to run for president of Belarus. However, the Central Election Commission of Belarus refused to register the initiative group to nominate him.

After the election commission refused to register Tikhanovsky's candidacy, his wife Sviatlana Tsikhanouskaya (Svetlana Tikhanovskaya), decided to run herself. The initiative group of Sviatlana Tsikhanouskaya was successfully registered by the Central Election Commission of Belarus. Sergei Tikhanovsky became the head of the initiative group to collect signatures for Sviatlana Tsikhanouskaya's participation in the presidential election.

On 20 May, Tikhanovsky was released from detention. Tikhanovsky explained that pressure from activist supporters helped to achieve his release. In an interview with him after the release, Deutsche Welle drew parallels between Tikhanovsky and both the Russian opposition leader Alexei Navalny and the Ukrainian actor Volodymyr Zelenskyy, who became the president of Ukraine. RTVI also drew a parallel between Tikhanovsky and Navalny.

Sergei Tikhanovsky began his trips around the country with pickets to collect signatures for Sviatlana Tsikhanouskaya. Tikhanovsky's pickets were very popular and gathered thousands of people. The queue to the picket in Minsk near Kamarouski market was half a mile. Several thousand people also attended the picket of Tikhanovsky in Gomel. Sergei Tikhanovsky announced that he was collecting signatures for fair elections in Belarus, without falsifications.

Sergei Tikhanovsky actively used the slogan "Stop, cockroach!" in his campaign, which was chanted by his supporters. The symbol of the Tikhanovsky's campaign was the slipper. The slogan "Stop, cockroach!" refers to the fairy tale "Cockroach" by Soviet poet Korney Chukovsky about how the "mustached cockroach" intimidated all the animals and became their ruler, referring here to President Lukashenko. Slippers are supposedly a traditional means of pest control. Euronews journalists referred to the events in Belarus as a "Slippers Revolution," quoting Belarusian activist Franak Viačorka using this phrase.

== Imprisonment and trial ==
On 29 May 2020, Tikhanovsky and other persons were arrested in the city of Grodno, in northwestern Belarus, while collecting signatures for Sviatlana Tsikhanouskaya's presidential candidacy, and charged with "organization or preparation for a grave breach of public order." Footage and witness accounts show that Tikhanovsky was detained following an incident after a woman aggressively followed and touched Tikhanovsky in an apparently deliberate attempted provocation; two police officers then "joined the woman in her pursuit of Sergei Tikhanovsky" and a scuffle with police ensued. According to the Viasna Human Rights Centre, at least 13 people were detained, including two members of Sviatlana Tsikhanouskaya's initiative group and three aides to Sergei Tikhanovsky. The Ministry of Internal Affairs of Belarus said that they had opened a criminal case for supposed "violence against police officers." Although Belarusian officials claimed that police were injured, there is no evidence in video footage of any injury.

In response to Tikhanovsky's detention on 29 May 2020, Sviatlana Tsikhanouskaya demanded the immediate release of her husband, condemning "the 'dirty' provocation" against him; declaring that "the picket was legal and peaceful in nature; and calling the arrest a politically motivated violation of her constitutional rights." Amnesty International and Human Rights Watch have condemned the Belarusian authorities' arrests of Tikhanovsky and the broader crackdown by Belarusian authorities on opposition figures, journalists, and bloggers ahead of the 2020 presidential election, including arbitrary arrest and detention and pretextual criminal charges. Amnesty stated that "The arrest and prosecution of Sergei Tikhanovsky and others detained alongside him are arbitrary, unwarranted and politically motivated" and considers the group to be "prisoners of conscience, as they are detained solely for peacefully exercising their human rights."

On 29 September 2020, Tikhanovsky's personal Telegram account noted that his prison sentence in Zhodzina had been extended by two more months. The decision was rendered without a hearing.

On 10 October 2020, Lukashenko spoke with the imprisoned Tikhanovsky and fellow candidate Viktar Babaryka in a four-hour meeting concerning changes to the Constitution. At that time, Tikhanovsky and Babaryka remained in custody.

On 30 November, it became known that Tikhanovsky's detention was extended for another 3 months. He was accused of a serious crime that carried a sentence of up to 12 years. Pending his conviction, he could be held in custody for up to 18 months.

On 11 March 2021, the Investigative Committee completed its criminal case investigation against Tikhanovsky, accusing him of using his blog to advocate for the violent overthrow of the Belarusian government. He faced four criminal charges with a sentence of up to 15 years. His trial began in Minsk on 24 June and he was found guilty. In December 2021, Tikhanovsky was sentenced to 18 years in prison. Five supporters (including Ihar Losik and Mikola Statkevich) were jailed for 14 to 16 years.

== Release ==
On 21 June 2025, Tikhanovsky was released from prison after US representative Keith Kellogg's visit to Belarus, along with 13 other political prisoners. All were transported to Lithuania, where they were receiving care. In a press conference held the following day, Tsikhanouski called on US President Donald Trump to request that all political prisoners in Belarus are released. He said that he had been completely isolated for five years: "You don't even get letters, not a single call. For five years, I couldn't even go to confession with a priest. No letters, no calls, no priest, no lawyer".

On 22 October 2025, Tikhanovsky and his wife were present in the European Parliament when another jailed Belarusian dissident Andrzej Poczobut received the Sakharov Prize. He told about a necessity to keep pressure on the Lukashenko regime.

After his release, Tikhanovsky settled down in Los Angeles.

== Recognition and awards ==
In December 2020, members of the Coordination Council of the Belarusian opposition, including the Tsikhanovskis, received the Sakharov Prize from the European Parliament.
