= Belarusian Congress of Democratic Trade Unions =

Trade union confederation in Belarus

BKDP
- Belarusian Congress of Democratic Trade Unions
- Беларускі кангрэс дэмакратычных прафсаюзаў
- Founded: 1993
- Dissolved: 2022
- Headquarters: Minsk
- Location: Belarus
- Members: 15,000
- Key people: Aliaksandr Yarashuk, President; Siarhei Antusevich, Vice-President
- Affiliations: ITUC
- Website: http://www.bkdp.org/

The Belarusian Congress of Democratic Trade Unions (Belarusian: Беларускі кангрэс дэмакратычных прафсаюзаў, romanized: Byelaruski kanhres demakratychnyh prafsayuzaw, Russian: Белорусский Конгресс демократических профсоюзов) was a confederation and center of trade unions in Belarus. It had 15,000 members in 4 affiliated unions and its headquarters were located in Minsk.

== Affiliates ==
The following trade unions are currently affiliated to BKDP:

- Belarusian Independent Trade Union
- Belarus Free Trade Union
- Free Metal Workers' Trade Union
- Belarusian Radio-Electrical Manufacturing Workers' Trade Union

== History ==
BKDP was founded in 1993.

In September 2020, during the 2020–2021 Belarusian protests, the Belarusian government arrested workers striking at Belaruskali. Some of the workers were members of BKDP-affiliate Belarusian Independent Trade Union, including its vice-president.

On April 7, 2022, the KGB declared the BKDP affiliate Belarusian Radio-Electrical Manufacturing Workers' Trade Union to be an extremist formation. This was the first time that Belarusian authorities had designated a registered trade union as extremist. On April 19, law enforcement agencies raided the offices of BKDP and several affiliated unions. They confiscated computers, paperwork and union flags. BKDP president Aliaksandr Yarashuk, vice-president Siarhei Antusevich and other officials from BKDP and affiliated unions were also arrested. The European Trade Union Confederation and the International Labour Organization condemned the arrests of the officials and demanded their release.

In July 2022, the Supreme Court of Belarus dissolved all the affiliated unions and the Congress itself, ostensibly for involvement in 'destructive activity' and 'disseminating extremist content'.

In late 2022 and early 2023, Belarusian courts sentenced the leaders of the independent unions to several years in prison.
