= Sviatlana Tsikhanouskaya =

Belarusian opposition leader (born 1982)

- Святлана Ціханоўская
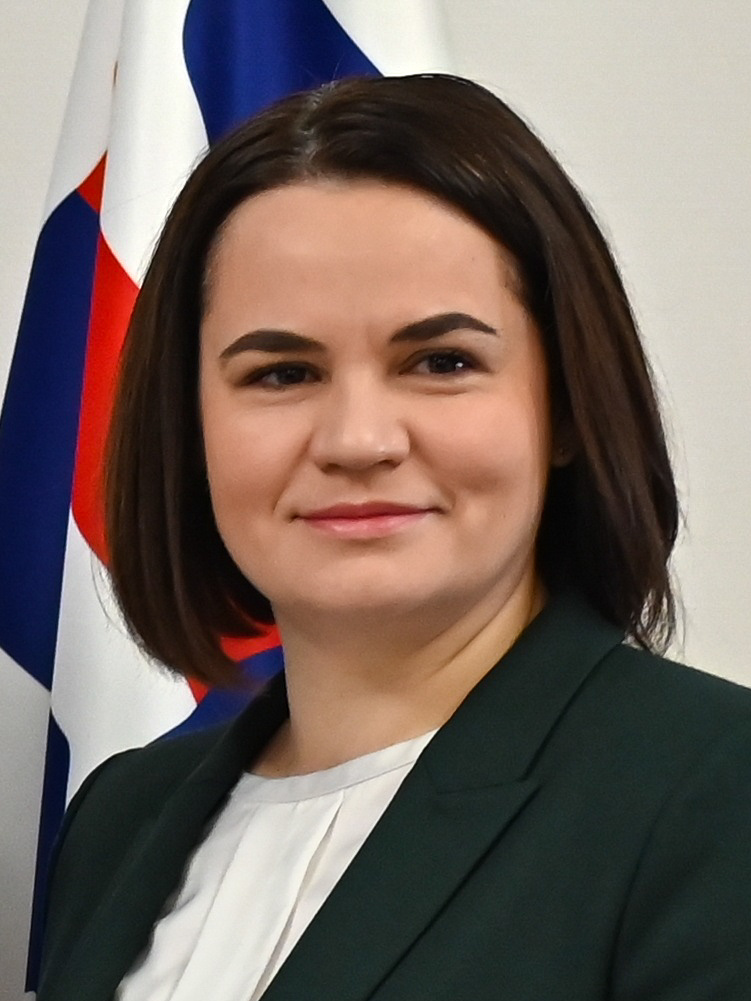
- Tsikhanouskaya in 2025

President of the Coordination Council
- Incumbent
- Assumed office 14 August 2020
- Cabinet Head: Herself
- Preceded by: Office established

Head of the United Transitional Cabinet
- Incumbent
- Assumed office 9 August 2022
- President: Herself
- Deputy: Pavel Latushko; Valery Kavaleuski (until 26 June 2024)
- Preceded by: Office established

Personal details
- Born: Sviatlana Heorhiyeuna Pilipchuk; 11 September 1982 (age 44) Mikashevichy, Byelorussia, Soviet Union
- Party: Independent
- Spouse: Sergei Tikhanovsky (m. 2004)
- Children: 2
- Education: Mozyr State Pedagogical University
- Website: tsikhanouskaya.org
- Sviatlana Tsikhanouskaya's voice Tsikhanouskaya on human rights abuses by the Belarusian government Recorded 13 August 2021

Sviatlana Hieorhiyeuna Tsikhanouskaya (Note: In this name that follows East Slavic naming customs, the patronymic is Heorhiyeuna and the family name is Pilipchuk.) (Note: Belarusian: Святлана Георгіеўна Ціханоўская, pronounced [sʲvʲaˈtlana ɣʲɛˈɔrɣʲijɛwna t͡sʲixaˈnɔwskaja]; Russian: Светлана Георгиевна Тихановская, romanized: Svetlana Georgiyevna Tikhanovskaya, pronounced [svʲɪˈtlanə ɡʲɪˈorɡʲɪ(j)ɪvnə tʲɪxɐˈnofskəjə]. Also romanized as Sviatłana Hieorhijeŭna Cichanoŭskaja in Łacinka and Svetlana Georgyevna Tikhanovskaya from Russian.) (née Pilipchuk; (Note: Belarusian: Піліпчук, pronounced [pʲilʲipˈt͡ʂuk]; Russian: Пилипчук, romanized: Pilipchuk, pronounced [pʲɪlʲɪpˈtɕuk]) born 11 September 1982) is a Belarusian opposition leader and political activist. Since running in the 2020 presidential election against President Alexander Lukashenko, she has led dissidence to his authoritarian rule through an alternate government operating from Lithuania and Poland.

Tsikhanouskaya became an opposition leader after her husband, Syarhei Tsikhanouski, sought to run in the 2020 presidential election. He was arrested, along with most other opposition leaders, and – since she could not file for presidential candidacy on his behalf – Tsikhanouskaya entered herself as a candidate. Lukashenko allowed her candidacy because he believed a woman could not create a legitimate opposition.

She ran on a platform of constitutional reform, seeking free and fair elections with term limits on the presidency, and she pledged to step down once those two goals had been implemented. After Lukashenko was declared the victor, she was held by Belarusian authorities and then forced into exile in Lithuania. Observers consider the election result to have been fraudulent, and Lithuania has recognized Tsikhanouskaya as Belarus's legitimate head of state.

Since fleeing to Lithuania, Tsikhanouskaya has established an opposition government. In 2020 she set up a Coordination Council and in 2022 a United Transitional Cabinet. As representative of a democratic Belarus, Tsikhanouskaya has met with several world leaders to negotiate sanctions against Lukashenko's government and to deny him recognition as a legitimate head of state.

Since the Russian invasion of Ukraine, she has advocated increased Western support for Ukraine, while warning that Russia's actions should not overshadow opposition to the dictatorship in Belarus. In 2023 Tsikhanouskaya was tried in absentia by the Belarusian government and sentenced to fifteen years in prison.

== Early life ==
Sviatlana Pilipchuk was born on 11 September 1982, in the village of Mikashevichy. Her father was a driver at a concrete factory, and her mother was a cafeteria cook. She grew up in a Soviet prefabricated apartment building, where she spent much of her time reading. Among her books were some from the United States, which she read to learn English and learn about the world outside of Belarus.

Pilipchuk's village was near the Chernobyl exclusion zone. When she was twelve years old, she was taken to Roscrea, Ireland, by the Chernobyl Lifeline charity, which helped children travel so as to reduce their exposure to radiation. Though Pilipchuk was not as affected by radiation as other students, her proficiency in school earned her a spot. While staying in Ireland, she would translate for the other children. Pilipchuk lived with a host family, the Deanes, who effectively became second parents to her. She returned over the following three summers, and she felt that Ireland was a more cheerful place than Belarus. Even after she stopped visiting Ireland, she has stayed in contact with the Deanes in adulthood.

Pilipchuk attended Mozyr State Pedagogical University to study teaching. While she was in Mazyr, she met nightclub owner Syarhei Tsikhanouski in 2003. They married in 2004, and she took the name Sviatlana Tsikhanouskaya. Together they had two children: a son and a daughter, about five years apart. Her son was born mostly deaf, and much of her time went to assisting him. She moved from Minsk to Gomel where he could receive treatment, including a cochlear implant. Until 2020, Tsikhanouskaya was an English teacher and interpreter. She retired so she had more time to raise her children. She pulled her children out of school when the COVID-19 pandemic developed, as the government had not taken any prevention measures.

== 2020 Belarusian presidential election ==
=== Background and building a campaign ===
In 2019, Tsikhanouskaya's husband started a YouTube channel, "A Country for Life", in which he interviewed people and challenged the rule of Belarusian president Alexander Lukashenko. He became a prominent opposition leader through his YouTube and Telegram presence, as well as his organization of political protests. He moved to challenge Lukashenko in the 2020 presidential election, and he was subsequently arrested for his protest activity days before the filing deadline. Tsikhanouskaya attempted to file for her husband by proxy but was rejected. In response, she filed for her own candidacy. She later said that she did this solely as a show of support for her husband. Tsikhanouskaya registered as an independent candidate on 14 July 2020.

Tsikhanouskaya initially had no interest in building a campaign. When her husband was released, he continued the campaign even though it was her name on the paperwork. He sometimes brought a life-size cutout of Tsikhanouskaya when he campaigned. She easily acquired the 100,000 signatures that were needed to run—a high limit that was expected to block opposition candidates from running. Her candidacy was confirmed on 19 July 2020. From this day, she travelled across Belarus to hold campaign events.

Tsikhanouski was arrested a second time, accused of assaulting a police officer in an incident that was later found to be staged. With her husband imprisoned, Tsikhanouskaya became the main opposition candidate against Lukashenko in the presidential election, making her a rare example of an opposition leader in an autocratic nation that arose through a political campaign. She aligned with Veronika Tsepkalo, the wife of opposition candidate Valery Tsepkalo who had fled the country, and Maria Kalesnikava, the campaign manager of opposition candidate Viktar Babaryka, who was arrested.

2020 was a time of political vulnerability for Lukashenko. He had grown more unpopular because of his mishandling of economic issues and his dismissive response to the COVID-19 pandemic in Belarus. Most opposition candidates were removed from the race, either through arrest or disqualification. Lukashenko allowed Tsikhanouskaya's candidacy, believing that as a woman she was not a significant political threat. He instead belittled her for being a female political candidate, using sexist language. Tsikhanouskaya leaned into the feminine aspects of her candidacy, emphasizing that she was a mother, and her gender may have indicated to voters that she was less likely to seek power for herself.

Instead of running as a protest candidate, encouraging a boycott as her husband had intended, she built a campaign. Tsikhanouskaya described herself as an "accidental candidate", and she said that she would only hold office until the Lukashenko dictatorship was seen to an end. Her role in the campaign was to serve as a face for the opposition movement rather than to engage in politics. Her role has been compared to Joan of Arc by the Belarusian press. She said of the campaign that "every day was full of fear".

=== Campaigning ===
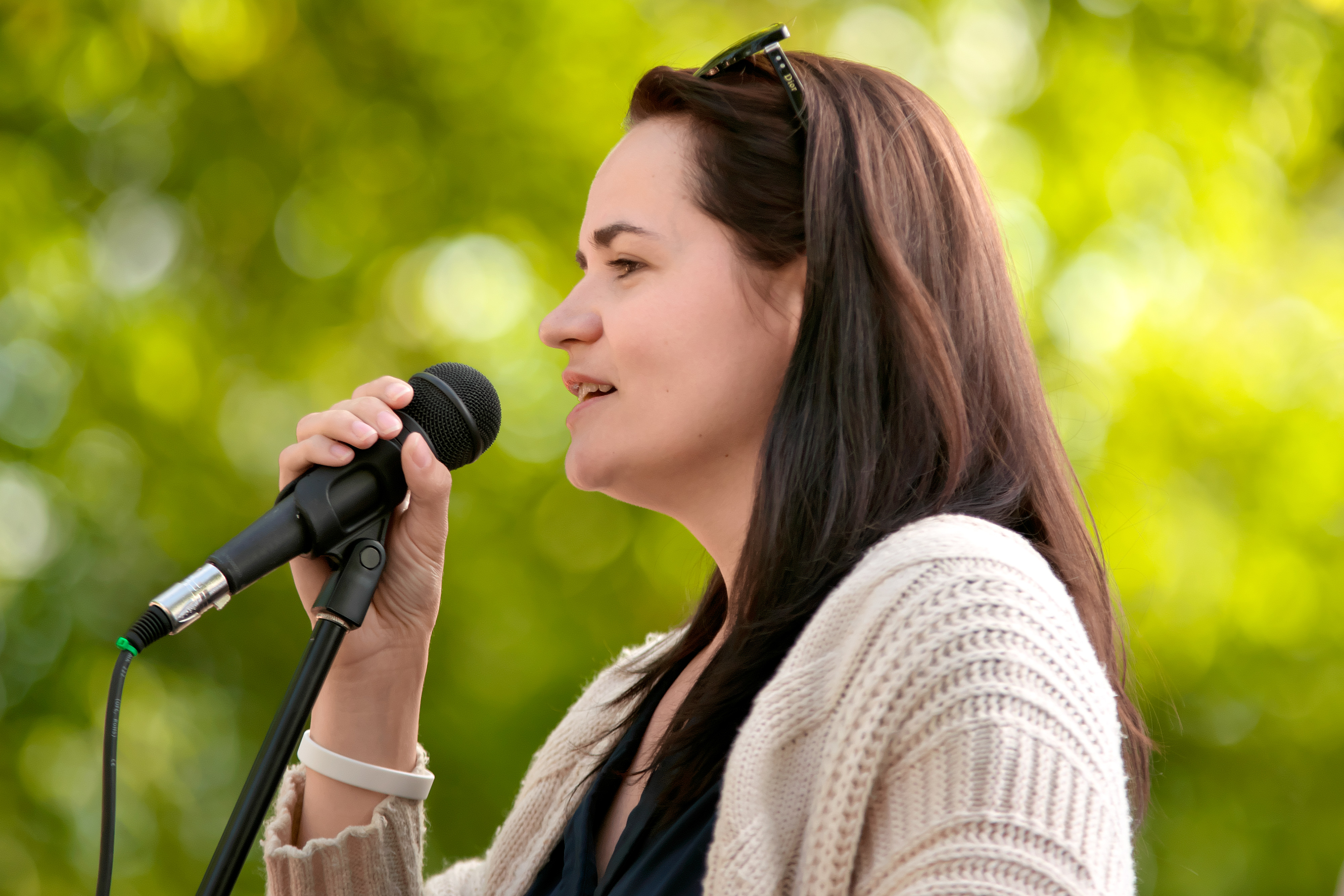
Tsikhanouskaya at a rally in Vitebsk on 24 July 2020

Though she was running as an independent candidate, Tsikhanouskaya attracted support from across the spectrum of Belarus's political opposition. Vital Rymasheuski, co-leader of Belarusian Christian Democracy, announced his party's support, as did the Belarusian Social Democratic Party (Assembly), United Civic Party of Belarus, and Belarusian Women's Party "Nadzieja". She also received support from 2010 presidential candidate Mikola Statkevich, and president of the Rada of the Belarusian Democratic Republic, Ivonka Survilla. Tsikhanouskaya's shared experience with the other wives of arrested dissidents earned her many supporters among women. Rallies in support of Tsikhanouskaya and in opposition to Lukashenko were the largest in the history of post-Soviet Belarus, attracting crowds of 20,000 in Brest and 220,000 in Minsk. Tsikhanouskaya had no political experience, and she had to be taught how to speak to the media. This endeared her to voters and protesters, who saw her as an ordinary citizen like themselves. Her open dislike of politics fuelled this response.

During the presidential campaign, Tsikhanouskaya was repeatedly threatened, recounting threatening phone calls from unknown numbers, which said, "We will put you behind bars and place your children in an orphanage". Tsikhanouskaya said she then decided to persevere in her campaign, saying that "there must be a symbol of freedom". Her campaign began as Amnesty International condemned Belarus's discriminatory treatment of women opposition activists, including threats of sexual violence and threats by authorities to take children away from opposition figures and send them to state-run orphanages. Worried for the safety of her children, Tsikhanouskaya had them hidden abroad in Lithuania.

Tsikhanouskaya said that she ran for president out of love, to free her husband from prison. She ran on only three political issues: the release of political prisoners, constitutional limitations on the presidency, and new elections. Once these three things happened, she said, she would step down from the presidency. To reform the constitution, she pledged to set a referendum on returning to the original draft of the 1994 Belarusian constitution, reinstating a limit of two terms for the president. She also vowed to move away from the union treaty with Russia. She said that her main goal was to establish free and fair elections. She viewed the election as illegitimate due to the government's refusal to register Lukashenko's main political opponents as candidates. She pledged to deliver a plan for transparent and accountable elections within six months of taking office.

Tsikhanouskaya's economic platform emphasized increasing the importance of small and medium-sized businesses in the Belarusian economy. She planned to offer interest free loans to small and medium-sized businesses, cancel state inspections of private entities, and provide legal protection for foreign investors. She planned to allow profitable state owned enterprises to continue to operate, while requiring unprofitable state owned enterprises to take advice from outside professionals.

=== Election day and departure from Belarus ===
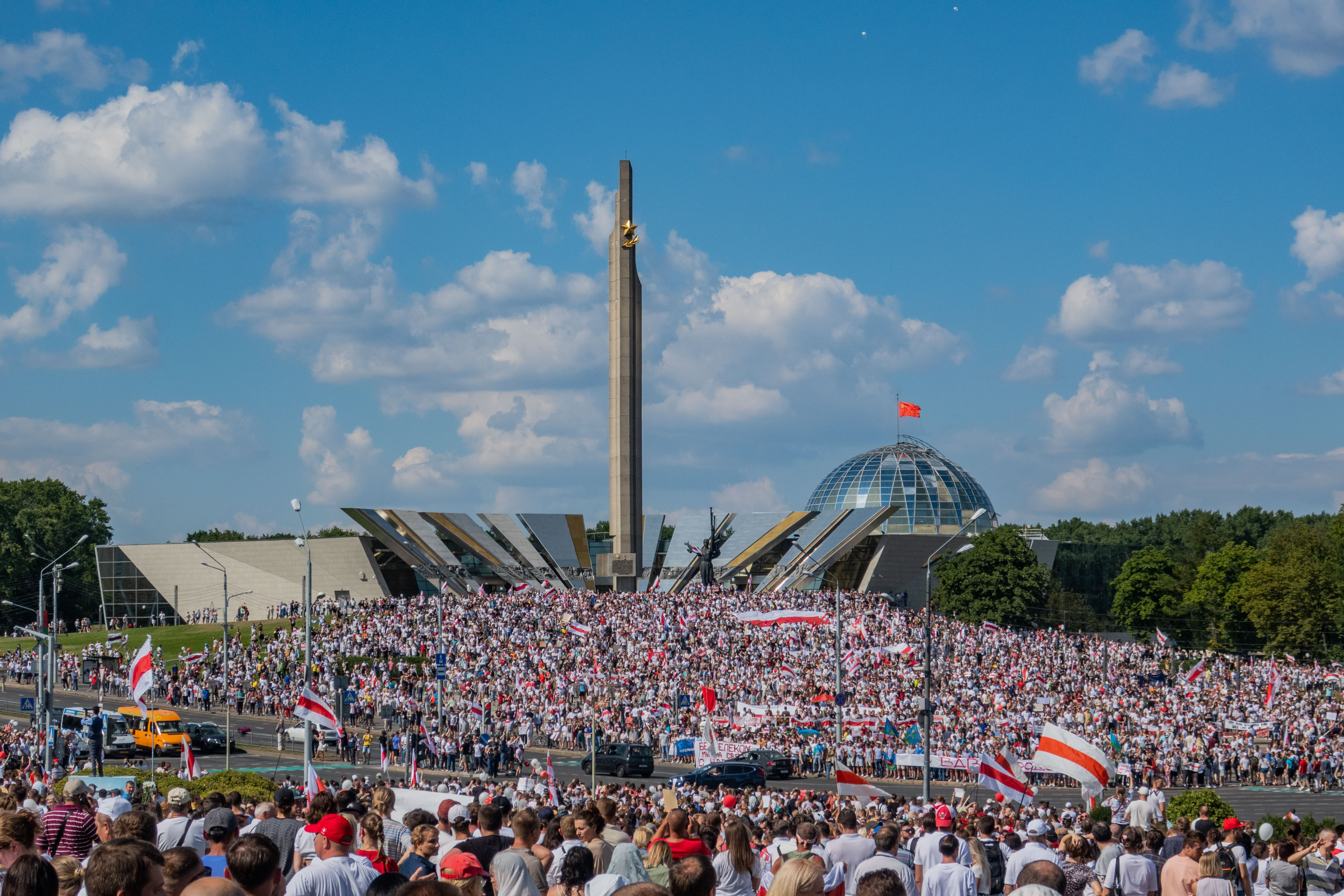
Protests in the centre of Minsk, 16 August 2020

The night before the election, police detained senior staffers from Tsikhanouskaya's campaign and she chose to go into hiding in Minsk, before re-emerging on election day at a polling station. When the results were announced, Tsikhanouskaya officially received only ten percent of the vote. Poll workers were required to engage in electoral fraud to ensure Lukashenko's victory over Tsikhanouskaya, and protests took place across Belarus in response. According to election monitor Golos and independent observers, Tsikhanouskaya was the legitimate winner of the election. After Belarusian state television released an exit poll showed Lukashenko winning by an overwhelming margin, Tsikhanouskaya said that she didn't trust that poll, saying, "I believe my eyes, and I see that the majority is with us".

Tsikhanouskaya and her lawyer went to the Central Election Commission the following day, where they were confronted by armed guards, and Tsikhanouskaya was forced to meet with Lukashenko's enforcer Andrei Pavlyuchenko. She was given an ultimatum to either leave the country, or to go to prison and have her children taken. They described to her in detail what life in prison would be like for her, where political prisoners were frequently tortured, and what life for her children would be like as wards of the state. She attempted to negotiate the release of her husband in exchange for ending her challenge and leaving the country. Her offer was refused, but instead she was able to negotiate the release of her campaign manager, Maria Moroz. Tsikhanouskaya and Moroz prepared to leave for Lithuania; Tsikhanouskaya collected her passport and her son's cochlear implant equipment, while Moroz arranged to have her own children escorted to Lithuania by her sister. The women also demanded that a Belarusian KGB agent escort them to the border in Moroz's car, to prevent the use of a car bomb.

A video was released of Tsikhanouskaya conceding to Lukashenko and asking the protesters to stand down. The stark change in demeanour and message led allies to say that the video had been coerced, with some going as far as to liken it to a hostage video.

== Exile ==
=== Establishing an opposition government-in-exile ===
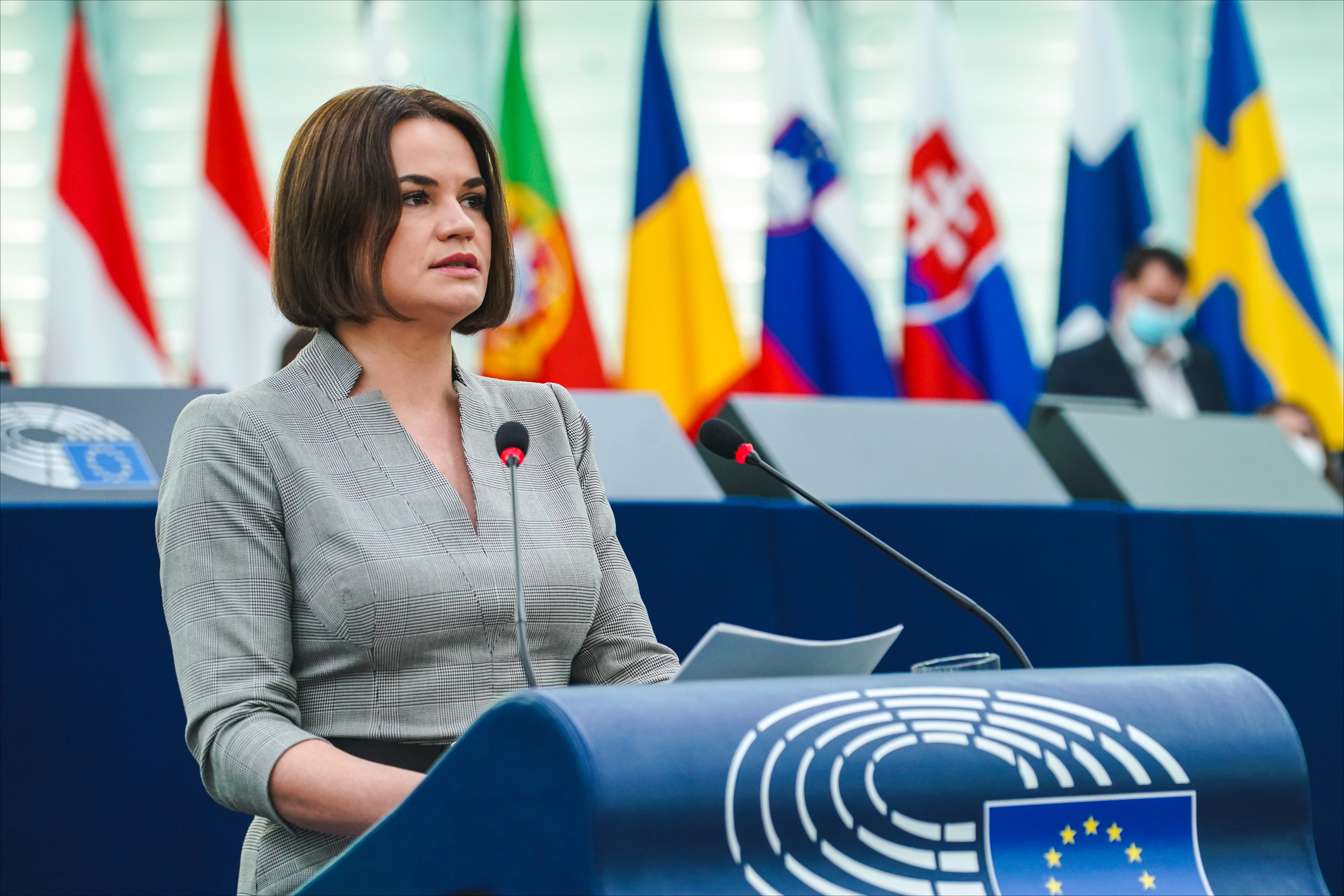
Tsikhanouskaya addresses the European Parliament in 2021

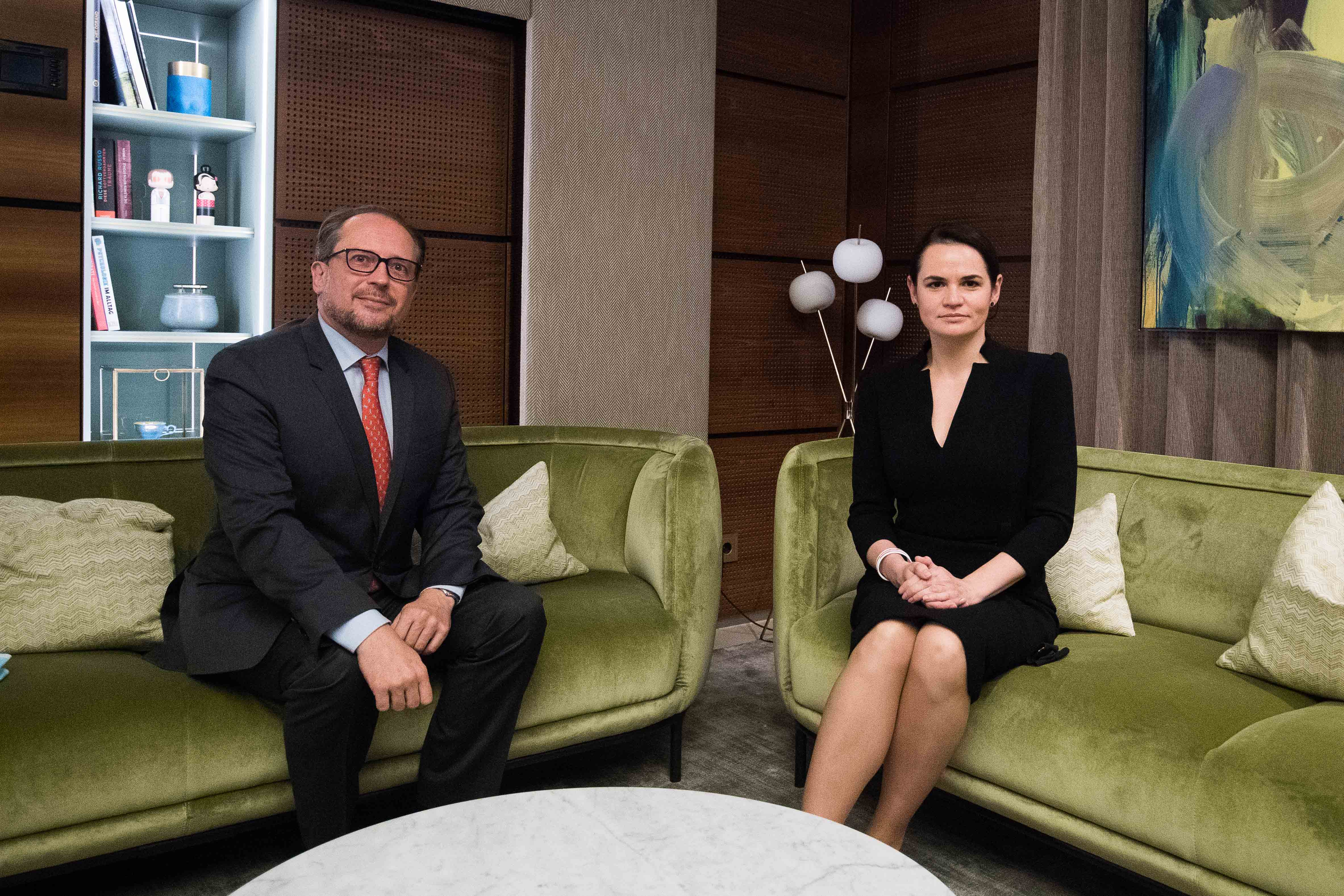
Sviatlana Tsikhanouskaya and Austrian Foreign Minister Alexander Schallenberg in Vienna in October 2020

On 11 August 2020, Lithuanian foreign minister Linas Linkevičius announced that Tsikhanouskaya was safe in Lithuania while also acknowledging that she had "few options". She felt that she had "betrayed" her supporters by leaving the country. The same day, the State Security Committee of Belarus (KGB) alleged that an attempt was being made on Tsikhanouskaya's life, saying that the protesters needed a "sacred sacrifice".

Days after she left the country, Tsikhanouskaya declared herself the "leader of democratic Belarus". To this effect, she announced the establishment of a Coordination Council to handle the transfer of power from Lukashenko. Applications for membership in the council were open only to Belarusian authority figures, such as respected professionals, authors, or sportspeople. Tsikhanouskaya considered herself to be an "interim-leader" of Belarus, but she has not claimed an entitlement to the presidency. She has indicated that she will not seek the presidency again, instead continuing her diplomatic work until fair elections can be held.

Tsikhanouskaya appealed to the international community to recognise her as the winner, travelling to various European capitals and meeting with world leaders, including President Joe Biden, Chancellor Angela Merkel, President Emmanuel Macron, President Ursula von der Leyen, President Charles Michel, Prime Minister Justin Trudeau. Western nations and the European Parliament have generally opted not to recognise Lukashenko's reelection. She has also sought sanctions against Belarus, speaking with world leaders in an effort to get them applied. After a period of protest, Lukashenko regained de facto control over the nation. Tsikhanouskaya has denied that she leads a government in exile, saying that she wished to create a "permanent opposition inside Belarus". The nation of Lithuania has recognized Tsikhanouskaya as the legitimate leader of Belarus.

On 31 January 2021, Norwegian parliamentarians Vervik Bulestad and Harek Elvesen nominated Svetlana Tikhanovskaya for the Nobel Peace Prize in 2022 for being a symbol of the ongoing struggle of Belarusian citizens for their freedom..

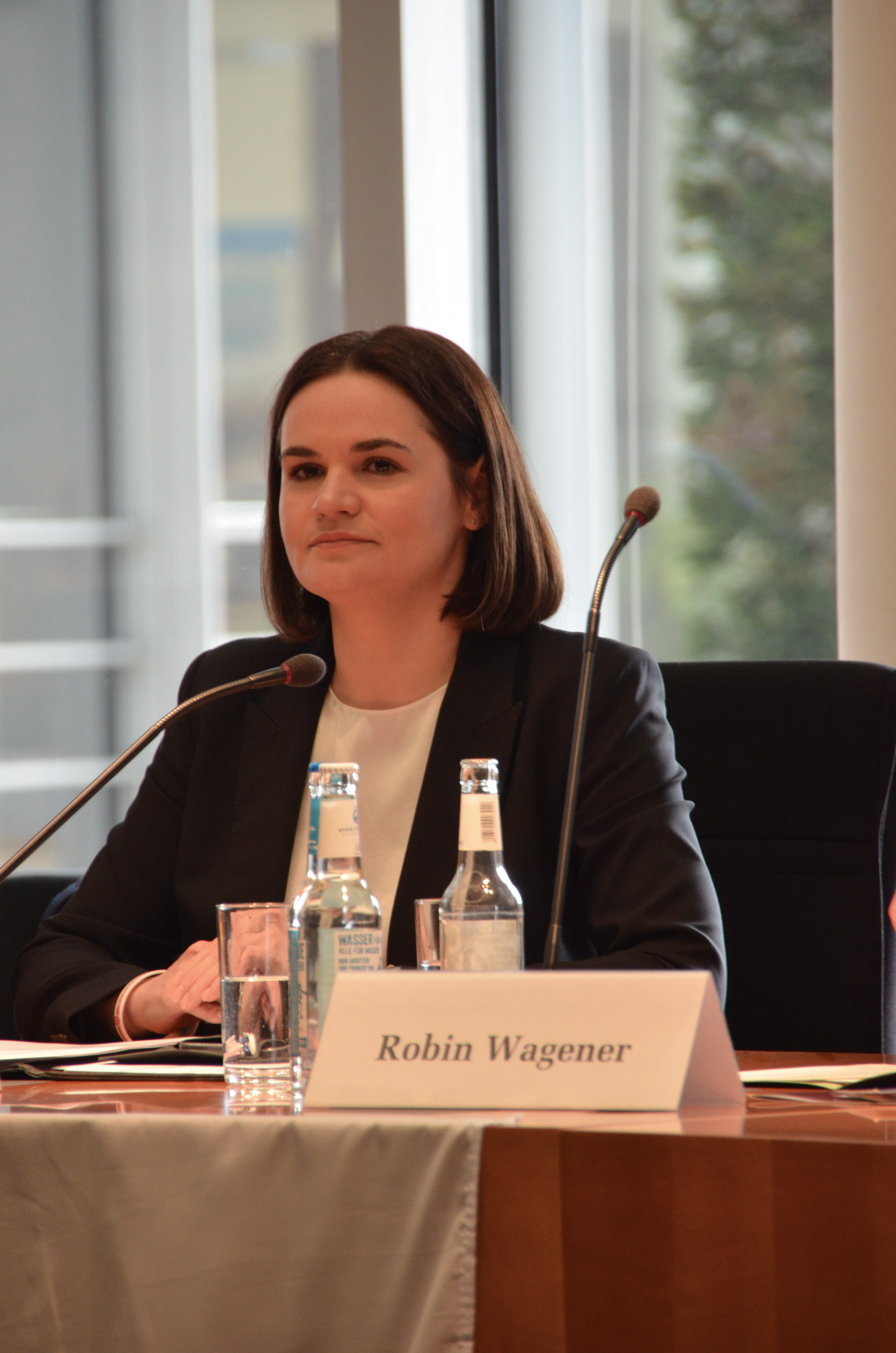
Tsikhanouskaya in the German Bundestag, 2023

On 9 August 2022, at a conference held in Vilnius, Tsikhanouskaya announced the creation of the United Transitional Cabinet. It initially consisted of Pavel Latushko (responsible for the transition of power), Aliaksandr Azarau (responsible for the restoration of law and order), Valery Kavaleuski (foreign affairs), and Valery Sakhashchyk (defence and national security). Belarus declared Tsikhanouskaya's organizations to be extremist formations in January 2023, making her subject to prison time should she be captured by the Belarusian government. Two months later, she was tried in absentia and sentenced to fifteen years in prison.

The European Parliament and several governments recognize Tsikhanouskaya and her structures as legitimate representatives of the Republic of Belarus. Tsikhanouskaya is often referred by foreign government representatives, diplomats and parliamentarians as "President", "President-elect", "Leader of Democratic Belarus", while her Cabinet is referred to as "government in exile." In August 2024, Tsikhanouskaya, her administrative Office, the Coordination Council, and the United Transitional Cabinet, negotiated an agreement describing principles and procedures of their respective roles, power relations, and dispute resolution procedures. Article 4.1 of the agreement defines Tsikhanouskaya as holding the role of National Leader, based on the 2020 presidential election, until "a free and fair election is held in Belarus" or until Tsikhanouskaya "decides to cease" her role.

The Council of Europe, the European Union and the United States have established formal cooperation with the structures led by Tsikhanouskaya.

Tsikhanouskaya's husband was one of fourteen Belarusian political prisoners who were pardoned and released on 21 June 2025. He joined her in Lithuania.

=== Russo-Ukrainian War ===
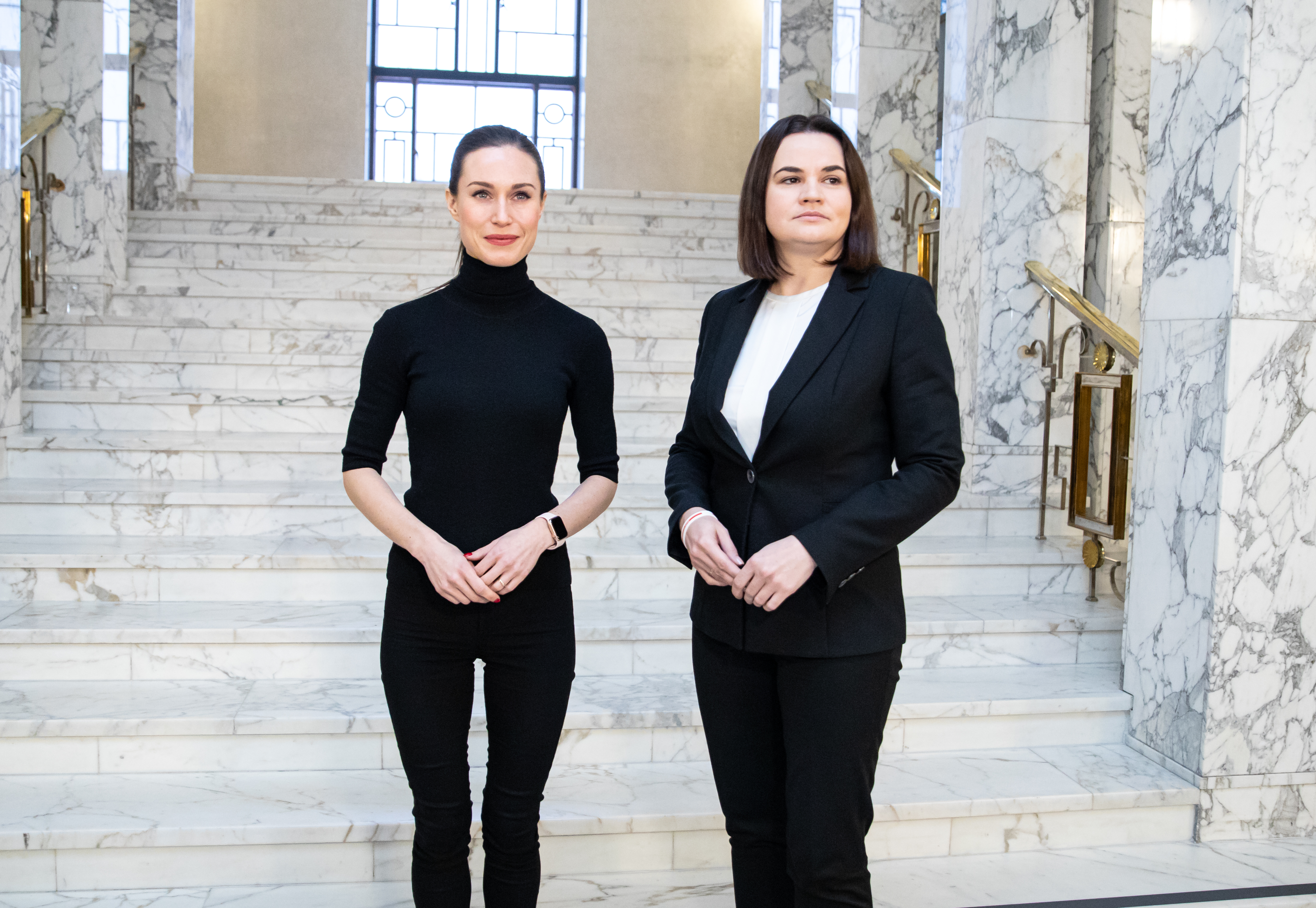
Tsikhanouskaya with Prime Minister of Finland Sanna Marin in Helsinki in 2022

When the Russian invasion of Ukraine took place in 2022, Tsikhanouskaya sought to promote the anti-war movement in Belarus. She has objected to the international framing of Belarus as merely a vassal state of Russia, alleging that it downplays the severity of Lukashenko's rule. Regarding Lukashenko's support of the invasion, Tsikhanouskaya accused him of treason.

Following Belarus's entry into the war, Tsikhanouskaya and her supporters developed the Pieramoha Plan (Victory Plan), a strategy involving underground dissidents in Belarus, engaging in information sharing and sabotage. She has said that the dissidents must wait until "the right moment", when instability allows for a change in power.

Tsikhanouskaya argues that the existence of a dictatorship in Belarus threatens the safety not only of Ukraine, but of the other states bordering Belarus: Latvia, Lithuania, and Poland, as Belarus has been used by Russia to attack neighbouring countries like Ukraine. She supports continued political and economic involvement by the West in support of Ukraine's efforts in the Russo-Ukrainian War. She has warned of war fatigue stymieing Western support for Ukraine and Belarusian dissidents.

On 25 January 2026, Ukrainian President Volodymyr Zelenskyy officially met with Svitlana Tikhanovskaya for the first time. Then the parties discussed support for Ukraine, the situation in Belarus, and the attitude of Belarusian society to the war.

On 25 May 2026, Tsikhanouskaya made her first working visit to Kyiv. During her visit, Tikhanovskaya attended the IV International Summit of Cities and Regions. On 26 May Svetlana Tsikhanouskaya met with Ukrainian President Volodymyr Zelenskyy. The two sides discussed Belarusian-Ukrainian relations.

== Awards ==
Tsikhanouskaya was on the 2020 list of the BBC's 100 Women, announced on 23 November 2020, and was included in the 2020 edition of The Bloomberg 50. Tsikhanouskaya and other Belarusian opposition leaders were awarded the European Parliament's 2020 Sakharov Prize for Freedom of Thought in a ceremony on 16 December in Brussels. Among dozens of distinctions, she is a recipient of the 2020 Globsec prize for freedom; 2022 International Four Freedoms Award; 2022 International Trailblazer Award; 2022 Tipperary International Peace Award, 2023 IDU Bush-Thatcher Award for Freedom; 2023 NATO PA “Women for Peace and Security” Award; 2023 Anna Lindh Prize laureate. She and other Belarusian opposition leaders won the 2022 Charlemagne Prize.

In 2021, she was nominated for the 2021 Nobel Peace Prize by Lithuanian president Gitanas Nausėda and multiple Norwegian members of parliament.

== See also ==
- 2020–2021 Belarusian protests
- Belarusian partisan movement (2020–present)
- New Belarus passport project
