= Alyaksandr Kanyuk =

Belarusian jurist and statesman

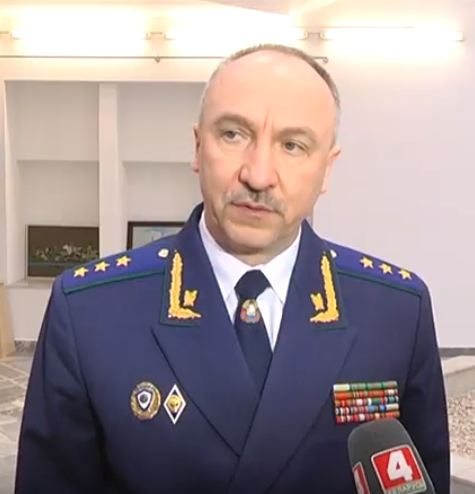
Alyaksandr Kanyuk, 2018

Alyaksandr Uladzimiravich Kanyuk (Belarusian: Аляксандр Уладзіміравіч Канюк, Russian: Александр Владимирович Конюк, romanized: Aleksandr Vladimirovich Konyuk) (born 1960) is a Belarusian jurist and statesman, former Prosecutor General of the Republic of Belarus (2011–2020).

Kanyuk graduated from the Belarusian State University in 1982. He was a military judge for a long time, and a Supreme Court of Belarus judge since 2009 before becoming the Prosecutor General.

After the disputed Belarusian presidential elections of 2020 he was sanctioned in relation to human rights violations in Belarus by the European Union.

In 2020 he was appointed ambassador to Armenia.
