= Yuri Gurski =

Belarusian IT entrepreneur

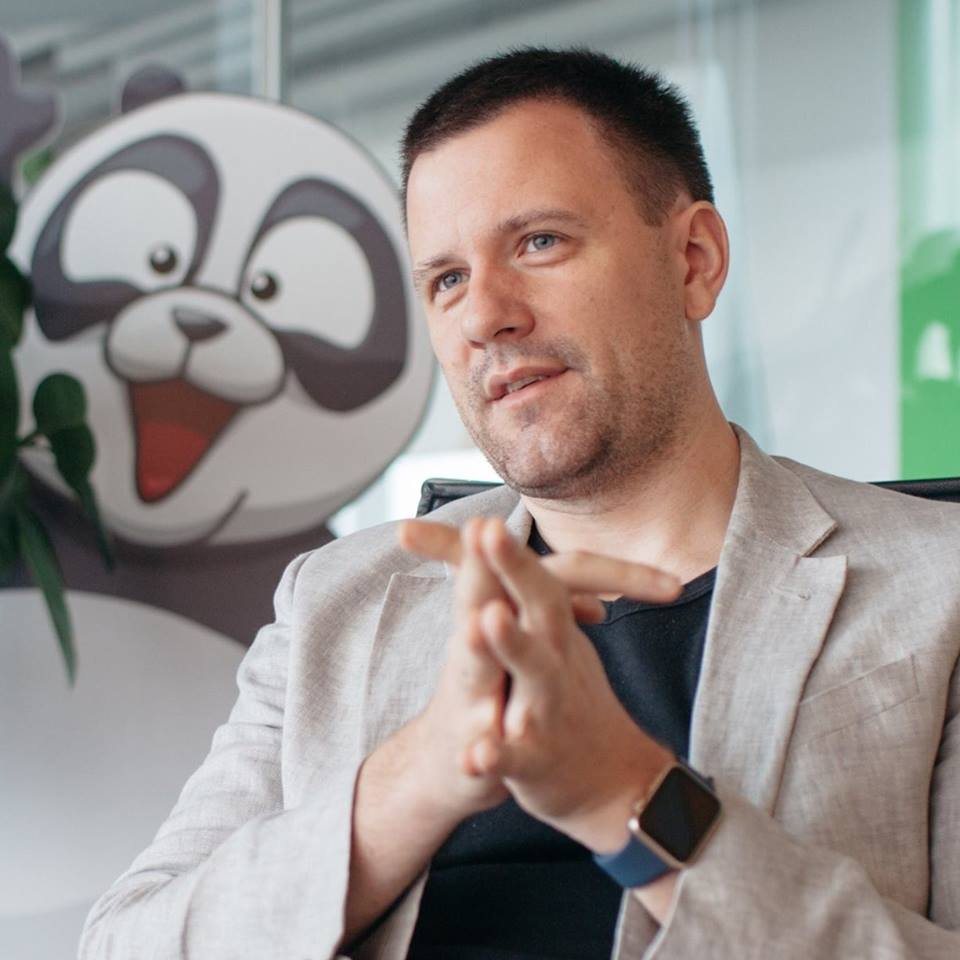
- Born: 23 January 1983 (age 43); Minsk, USSR (Now Belarus)
- Education: Belarusian State University, IPM Business School
- Occupation: IT entrepreneur
- Years active: Since 2006
- Spouse: Divorced

Yuri Gurski (Belarusian: Юры Анатол'евіч Гурскі; born 23 January 1983) is a Belarusian IT entrepreneur. He is the co‑founder and president of Flo Health and a number of other startups that were subsequently acquired by companies including Facebook, Mail.ru Group, and Google, as well as by the investor Teddy Sagi.

Gurski is also co‑founder and CEO of Palta.com (previously known as Haxus), a health and well‑being technology company. Its best‑known products include the Flo and Lensa mobile applications; Flo has since become one of the most widely used women's health apps globally.

In 2016, GoalEurope described Gurski as "the most successful IT entrepreneur in Eastern Europe."

== Life ==
Yuri Gurski was born on 23 January 1983 in Minsk, Belarus.

In 2000, he graduated from secondary school No. 219. In 2008, he completed a master’s degree in journalism from Belarusian State University. In 2010, he obtained an Executive MBA degree from the IPM Business School under the Kozminski University program (Warsaw, Poland).

Gurski worked as the CEO of the Piter M LLC (the representative office of the Piter Publishing House in Minsk) from September 2003 to December 2009.

In 2008, he co-founded Ideanomix book house in partnership with one of the largest CIS publishing houses, EKSMO. Since 2006, he has been working in the IT sector.

He has a twin brother, Dmitry, who is a CEO of Flo.

In 2016, Gurski and his family moved to Limassol, Cyprus. Gurski is a vegetarian.

== IT-Business ==
In 2009, Gurski co-founded Viaden Mobile, part of Viaden Media. The company’s main focus was the creation of fitness and gaming apps, including All-in Pedometer, Yoga.com, and All-in Fitness. In 2012, Viaden Mobile was acquired by Israeli billionaire Teddy Sagi.

In 2013, Gurski took over as CEO of Sport.com, which specialized in fitness apps. Under his leadership, the company became a resident of the Belarus High Technologies Park and developed several popular mobile applications for sports and fitness. He left the project in 2014.

In 2014, he became a mentor of the Maps.me project. During Gurski's two-year tenure, the project grew into a widely used offline mobile map for travelers, reaching over 90 million installations worldwide. Later that year, it was acquired by Mail.ru Group and integrated into its My.com brand.

Gurski also joined Mail.ru in November 2014. In 2016, he held the position of Vice President of new product development. He left Mail.ru Group on 29 July 2016. Representatives stated a conflict of interest as the reason, which was later resolved.

He was a mentor and investor of the MSQRD project, acquired by Facebook on 9 March 2016.

Gurski co-founded Palta, which in 2015 created the Flo, an AI-powered women’s health platform. In October 2018, Palta received a $200 million valuation. In subsequent years, Flo reached a valuation exceeding $1 billion, attaining unicorn status. As of 2021, it had more than 2.4 million active subscribers and employed over 600 people across its offices in London, Munich, Limassol, Vilnius, and Warsaw.

In July 2024, Flo Health raised over $200 million in a Series C funding round, reaching a valuation of over $1 billion. As of 2024, the app had approximately 70 million monthly active users and around 5 million paid subscribers worldwide. The company has expanded into broader health areas including fertility, pregnancy, perimenopause, and menopause.

In addition to Flo, Palta has developed a portfolio of health and wellness applications including Simple (nutrition and intermittent fasting) and Zing Coach, an AI-based fitness platform. It also operates Lensa, a neural network based photo editing app, which gained global popularity in 2022.

Gurski has also been active as an investor and mentor in the technology sector, supporting startups in artificial intelligence, mobile applications, and digital health.

In spring 2018, Gurski cooperated with Gagarin Capital, a venture capital firm focused on AI-driven projects, including Prisma.

In August 2021, Palta announced that it had raised $100 million in a Series B funding round led by Per Brillioth at VNV Global.

== Publications ==
Gurski was the owner of the Ideanomix publishing house, and an author of about 30 popular books on information technology, including a bestseller about Photoshop.

Selected works:

- Y. Gurski, A. Zhvalevski. Video Tutorial. Photoshop CS4
- Y. Gurski, G. Kondratyev. Photojokes with Photoshop
- Y. Gurski. Photoshop CS2: Tips and Tricks
- Y. Gurski, A. Zhvalevski, V. Zavgorodni. CG: Photoshop CS5, CorelDRAW X5, Illustrator CS5
- Y. Gurski. Digital Photography. Tips and Tricks

== Awards and recognition ==
- Ranked No. 1 in Top Belarusian Business People Under 40 in 2016 and 2017, Probusiness.by magazine
- Ranked No. 3 in Top 50 Personalities in the Belarusian IT World 2016, ITmentor
- Ranked No. 9 in Top Belarusian Business People Under 40 in 2015, Probusiness.by magazine
- “Mentor of the Year 2014", BEL.BIZ / Belarus High-Tech Park
- “Belarus Entrepreneur of the Year 2011"
