= Viaden Media =

- Company type: Private
- Industry: Entertainment
- Founded: 2001; 25 years ago
- Founder: Yuri Gurski
- Headquarters: Minsk, Belarus
- Area served: Belarus
- Key people: Viktor Prokopenya; Yuri Gurski
- Products: software
- Number of employees: more 100
- Website: http://viaden.com

Viaden Media is a software development company. It was founded in 2001 by the Belarusian businessman and investor Viktor Prokopenya. The company has grown into one of the largest producers of applications for iPhone and iPad in the Central and Eastern Europe region. In 2012, it was acquired by Teddy Sagi, the co-founder of Playtech. Later the company was divided into Sport.com and Skywind Group.

== History ==
In 2001, Viktor Prokopenya founded Viaden Media as an outsourcing developer of IT. In 2006, the company changed its focus and began to produce its own software products for the online entertainment industry. In 2009, the company launched a new division, Viaden Mobile, that began developing mobile applications for the new iOS platform, and later Android. Viaden Mobile was headed by Yuri Gurski.

In 2006, Viaden Media joined the World Wide Web Consortium (W3C) and then in 2007, the company became a resident of the Belarus High Technologies Park (HTP). In that same year, Viaden Media became the first Belarusian company to be a member of the International Chamber of Commerce (ICC).

By 2011, the company became the largest mobile phone software developer in the post-Soviet region, with an exceptionally strong position in the segments of online games and health monitoring applications software.

In 2011–2012, the company was sold to the Israeli businessman and billionaire Teddy Sagi, the founder of Playtech, the world's largest producer of software for gambling. According to the information in the press, Viaden Media was estimated at €95 million.

After the change in ownership, the company kept its development center in Minsk, Belarus. Later Viaden Media was divided into two companies: Sport.com (the largest developer of fitness applications and owner of portals sport.com and yoga.com) and the Skywind Group (who specialise in mobile and social games). The founder of the company, Viktor Prokopenya, focused on new projects, including his company exp(capital), that develops solutions for the algorithmic trading of financial instruments.

Yuri Gurski, head of Viaden Media, worked at Sport.com as its CEO until October 2014, when his contract expired. He has also acted as a business angel for Belarusian start-ups.

== Software ==
By 2010, Viaden had released 4 of 10 most financially successful entertainment applications for the iPad. In July of that year, their application All-in Fitness, became a leader in more than 40 countries, in the Healthcare & Fitness section of the AppStore. In the US, the application was included into the top-30 paid apps in the App Store. In Russia, All-in Fitness has become the most popular programme of all available applications.

Viaden Media was twice recognised in the annual App Store Awards given by Apple. In 2010 and 2011, the company was recognised for the App Store Rewind award in the Fitness category.

== Awards ==
Viaden Media supported the Belarusian Startup Weekend and other events for young entrepreneurs. The company has also sponsored many IT conferences. Due to this, in 2009, 2010 and 2011, the company was recognised as the ‘Best Entrepreneur of the Year’.

In 2011, Viaden Media became one of the top three companies according to feedback from its employees. The award was given by the Belarusian IT portal Dev.by.

In the same year, the Belarusian High Tech Park awarded the company with a ‘Golden Byte-2011’ award in the nominating category ‘Dynamically Developing IT Company’.

== Links ==
- Official website
