= Softeq =

Softeq Development Corp.
- Type: Private company
- Founded: 1997; 29 years ago
- Headquarters: Houston, Texas, United States
- Area served: Worldwide
- Key people: Christopher A. Howard (Founder & CEO)
- Services: Hardware; Embedded; Mobile; Web; Desktop; IoT; Blockchain; Robotics; AR/VR solutions; Game apps
- Number of employees: >500 (2023)
- Website: www.softeq.com

Softeq Development Corporation is a privately held company based in Houston in the US State of Texas that offers full-stack development company focusing on low-level programming (drivers, firmware,) hardware, (from PCBs to full-scale devices), and software apps for web, desktop, and mobile. Softeq builds end-to-end IoT and cloud infrastructure solutions, and provides technology business consulting services.

== History ==
Softeq was founded by Christopher A. Howard in Houston, Texas in 1997. The name “Softeq” is a combination of the terms "software" and "technical". That year, the company secured Compaq as its first client, developing the Compaq PC Theater during the early days of the convergence of computers and television technology. Softeq was involved in app development for the HP iPAQ handheld PDA. In 2001, Compaq was acquired by Hewlett-Packard.

In 2008, the company opened a full-stack research and development (R&D) center in High Tech Park located in Minsk, Belarus, which became its development center, and now has 300 employees.

In 2018, Softeq acquired NearShore Solutions GmbH. which was rebranded as Softeq Development GmbH and became Softeq's European sales office in Munich, Germany.

In 2020, Softeq established a sales office in London, United Kingdom. In November 2020, Softeq Innovation Lab was launched, which is a virtual lab with online boot camps for corporate executives and product teams.

In February 2021, Softeq opened a full-stack development center in Vilnius, Lithuania. Later that year, the company launched a startup accelerator program – Softeq Venture Studio.

In 2022, Softeq Venture Fund, was created to provide capital to the Softeq Venture Studio.

Softeq is a Gold Application Development Partner of Microsoft, Xamarin Authorized Consulting Partner, and an official member of Apple Inc.’s MFi Program.

== Brands ==
=== DURATEQ ===
DURATEQ is a handheld device designed for assistive listening and closed captioning in public venues. The system was developed with contributions from the WGBH Media Access Group (MAG) and the National Center for Accessible Media (NCAM).

The device has been deployed across multiple sites, including facilities operated by the National Park Service, as well as locations such as George Washington's Mount Vernon, Walt Disney Parks and Resorts, the World of Coca-Cola museum, the Hall at Patriot Place in Foxborough, Massachusetts, AT&T Stadium in Dallas, and the National Museum of the American Indian.

Softeq Venture Studio

Softeq Venture Studio is a startup accelerator established in 2021. The studio provides engineering support, startup development services, and funding to early-stage companies in exchange for equity. Participant enrollment began in October 2021. In 2022, the studio organized two cohorts, bringing the total number of participating startups to 49. Participating companies have included startups in areas such as wellness, medical technology, and sports technology.

Softeq Venture Fund

Softeq Venture Fund is a venture capital fund established in 2022 with a reported size of $40 million. The fund provides capital to companies associated with Softeq Venture Studio and participates in seed and Series A funding rounds. Jumana Capital, a Houston-based single-family office, invested in the fund in 2022, and Royal Eagle Capital Partners committed $3 million in the same year.

Softeq Innovation Lab

Softeq Innovation Lab is an initiative launched in 2020 in Houston, Texas. It includes training programs and collaborative projects for corporate teams working on product development and innovation. The program covers areas such as IoT, artificial intelligence, and computer vision, and includes collaboration with external participants.

== Spinoffs ==
=== Softeq Flash Solutions ===
Softeq’s spin-off became part of SK Hynix's R&D center for flash memory products. Softeq established a team of flash firmware and software engineers with experience in semiconductor and flash memory projects. The team was spun off as Softeq Flash Solutions. In 2014, South Korean SK Hynix, the world's second-largest memory chip maker acquired the NAND Flash memory development unit of Softeq in Minsk leading to the formation of Softeq Flash Solution LLC.

=== zGames ===
zGames LLC, the game development brand of Softeq, was launched in 2008. The company provides full-cycle game design and development services and makes casual, mixed reality, educational, and gambling apps for mobile, desktop, web, VR, and AR. zGames also remade several classic game titles, including Pong World and QIX Galaxy. In 2012, zGames won the Pong® Indie Developer Challenge by Atari, beating out over 100 other developers to recreate Pong for mobile gaming. zGames was spun off in 2012.
