= Flo (app) =

Menstruation and menopause tracking app

- Developers: Flo Health, Inc.
- Release: 2015; 11 years ago
- Operating system: iOS; Android
- Available in: 22 languages
- Website: flo.health

Flo is a period-tracking app that provides menstrual cycle, ovulation and pregnancy tracking as well as perimenopause symptom tracking that was developed by Flo Health, Inc. It has over 380 million downloads worldwide and over 70 million monthly active users as of November 2024.

In mid-2024, it reached unicorn status.

The company has been sued for sharing users' sensitive health data with third parties, like Google and Meta, without consent and misleading its users about data practices. Flo and Google decided to settle in court rather than go to trial and both paid a combined sum of $56 million, while Meta did not settle and was found guilty by a jury in 2025.

== History ==
Flo Health, Inc. was co-founded in 2015 by brothers Dmitry and Yuri Gurski, in Minsk, Belarus, where the company was originally headquartered. Dmitry serves as the company's CEO. The company's development hubs are in London, Amsterdam and Vilnius.

In 2016, the company raised $1 million in seed round funding from Flint Capital and Haxus Venture Fund. In 2017, Flo received an investment of $5 million from Flint Capital and model Natalia Vodianova with Vodianova helping develop an awareness campaign for the company. In 2018, Flo received an investment of $6 million from Mangrove Capital Partners, with participation from Flint Capital and Haxus, giving the company a valuation of $200 million. In mid-2019, Flo received an additional investment of $7.5 million led by Founders Fund.

In early September 2021, Flo announced it closed $50M in a Series B financing, bringing the total capital raised to $65 million and company valuation to $800M led by VNV Global and Target Global.

In July 2024, Flo announced it raised more than $200M in Series C financing from General Atlantic bringing its valuation beyond $1 billion. As of November 2024, the app had over 380 million downloads world wide, and over 70 million monthly active users.

In 2025, Flo adopted a data intelligence platform from Databricks to power its analytics and AI features, allowing users personalized cycle predictions.

== Features ==
Flo was initially created as a period and ovulation tracking application. It now provides reminders of upcoming menstrual cycles and a place to record various other health symptoms such as contraceptive methods, vaginal discharge (leukorrhea), water intake, pains, mood swings, and sexual activity.

The free version of Flo gives you access to period and ovulation tracking and predictions, symptom tracking, cycle history, and anonymous mode.

In Pregnancy mode, the app provides tracking features and educational material for pregnancy.

In September 2022, Flo released a feature called "Anonymous Mode". Flo said this mode allows users to access the app without any personal identifiers such as name, email address, or technical identifiers being associated with their health data. Flo said it uses a technology called Oblivious HTTP to help protect user privacy in Anonymous Mode.

In October 2023, Flo launched Flo for Partners, a feature on the app that allows users to share their Flo data with another user.

Flo is the only period-tracking app to have dual ISO 27001 and ISO 27701 certifications for security and privacy.

== Legal Issues ==
In 2020, the Federal Trade Commission alleged that Flo had misled users about its handling of health information to third parties including Google, Facebook, AppsFlyer, and Flurry since 2016. These allegations followed a 2019 report by The Wall Street Journal in reference to Facebook. The company reached a settlement in 2021 and was required to notify users of how their personal information was shared and obtain permission before any further information was shared. The agreement also required Flo to undertake an independent privacy audit, which it completed in March 2022.

In March 2024, the Supreme Court of British Columbia certified a class action suit against Flo for sharing intimate data with Facebook and other third parties without user knowledge. The certification application was heard in a second phase in February 2025, and on May 30, 2025, the court issued a further certification decision covering a national class excluding Quebec. Flo has appealed the certification; as of mid-2026, no hearing date had been set. A separate class action was authorized to proceed in Quebec on November 30, 2022.

A separate, consolidated U.S. class action, Frasco v. Flo Health, Inc. (N.D. Cal., filed 2021), named Flo, Meta, Google, and Flurry as defendants, alleging violations of the California Invasion of Privacy Act (CIPA), the California Confidentiality of Medical Information Act, and related privacy claims over data shared between November 1, 2016, and February 28, 2019. Flurry settled in March 2025 for $3.5 million, and Google agreed to settle for $48 million shortly before trial. Flo Health settled on July 31, 2025, midway through trial, agreeing to pay $8 million and to display a privacy-commitment notice on its website for one year following final approval.

== Recognition ==
Flo was named as one of Bloomberg’s Top 25 UK Startups to Watch for 2024.

Flo's Anonymous Mode feature was featured on Fast Company's World Changing Ideas 2023, and TIME's Best Inventions List 2023.

Flo is a CES 2019 Innovation Awards Honoree in the Software and Mobile Applications category.
