= Vsevolod Yanchevski =

Belarusian politician

Vsevolod Vyacheslavovich Yanchevsky
- Всеволод Вячеславович Янчевский
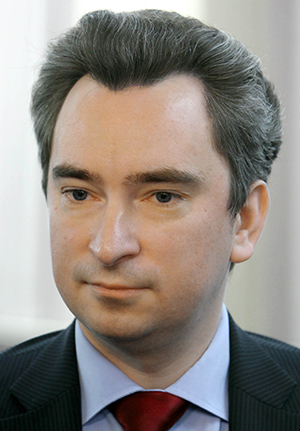

Director of the Administration, Chairman of Supervisory Board, Belarus High Technologies Park
- Incumbent
- Assumed office 2017, 2013
- President: Alexander Lukashenko
- Preceded by: Valery Tsepkalo

Advisor to President, Head of Main Ideology Department of the Presidential Administration of Belarus
- In office 2008–2017
- President: Alexander Lukashenko

Member of the National Assembly of Belarus
- In office 2000–2004
- President: Alexander Lukashenko

First Secretary of the Central Committee of the Belarusian Patriotic Youth Union
- In office 1996–1997
- President: Alexander Lukashenko

Personal details
- Born: April 22, 1970 (age 56) Barysau, Byelorussian SSR, Soviet Union
- Party: Slavic Union 'White Rus' (in mid-1990s)
- Awards: Order of Honor (Belarus)

Vsevolod Yanchevsky (Yanchevsky, Russian: Всеволод Вячеславович Янчевский, Belarusian: Усевалад Янчэўскі, Usievalad Yancheuski; born April 22, 1976) is a Belarusian politician and statesman. In 2008-17, he was Advisor of the President of the Republic of Belarus Alexander Lukashenko — Head of Ideology Department of the Administration of the President of the Republic of Belarus. In 2017-22, Yanchevsky was Director of the Hi-Tech Park.

== Career ==
=== Education and early career ===
Vsevolod Yanchevsky was born on April 22, 1976, in Barysau, Minsk Region. In 1998 he graduated from the Law Faculty of the Belarusian State University majoring in Politics and Public Administration. In 2000, he graduated from the Faculty of International Relations of BSU. Alexander Lukashenko was one of Yanchevsky's fellow students.

In 1994, Yanchevsky took an active part in the election campaign in the Republic of Belarus in Alexander Lukashenko's team. In 1995 he was a member of Stanislau Shushkevich's campaign office during the Belarusian Supreme Council election. In 1996, he was one of the founders and active members of youth organization "Priamoe deistvie" ("Direct action"), created in support of Alexander Lukashenko. From 1997 to 2001, Vsevolod Yanchevsky worked as a first secretary of the Central Committee of the public association "Belarusian Patriotic Youth Union", pro-governmental organization that involved youth policy divisions of local government.

In the fall of 2000, Yanchevsky was elected as a member of the House of Representatives of the National Assembly of the Republic of Belarus of the 2nd convocation (at the age 24). He was a member of the Standing Committee of Education, Culture, Science and Technical Progress.

Yanchevsky managed to convey his idea on reforming the state youth policy to Alexander Lukashenko. In 2002 the newly formed government-funded organization Belarusian Republican Youth Union was created.

In 2005-08, Yanchevsky worked as a chief editor of the "Planeta" magazine.

In the fall of 2000, Yanchevsky was elected as a member of the House of Representatives of the National Assembly of the Republic of Belarus of the 2nd convocation (at the age 24). He was a member of the Standing Committee of Education, Culture, Science and Technical Progress. Yanchevsky managed to convey his idea on reforming the state youth policy to Alexander Lukashenko. In 2002 the newly formed government-funded organization Belarusian Republican Youth Union was created.

From 2005 to 2007, Yanchevsky worked as a chief editor of the "Planeta" magazine.

=== Political career ===
In 2007 he was the First Deputy Head of Directorate General – the Head of Ideology Work Coordination Department of the Administration of the President of the Republic of Belarus. On April 18, 2008, Yanchevsky was appointed Advisor on ideology to President Lukashenko and the Head of the State Ideology Department of the Administration of the President of the Republic of Belarus.

On April 18, 2008, Yanchevsky was appointed Advisor on ideology to President Lukashenko and the Head of the State Ideology Department of the Administration of the President of the Republic of Belarus. He was the first is the Central Committee of the "Belarusian Patriotic Youth Union", who managed to get such a high position in the Administration of the President of the Republic of Belarus. However, Yanchevsky always had quite liberal views and rhetoric, he emphasised that his department "has the task of explaining public policy, not to spread propaganda". He spoke out strongly against any administrative pressure.

By Decree No. 531 of December 2, 2013, the President of Belarus entrusted Yanchevsky with the functions of supervisor of "unified state policy in the areas of informatization, information and communication technologies, telecommunication and high technologies" and appointed him Chairman of the Supervisory Board of the Hi-Tech Park. Yanchevsky was empowered to give binding instructions to state agencies within his competence and to control their implementation, he became in charge of personnel appointments in the Ministry of Communications (including the Department of Informatisation), the State Committee of Science and other agencies responsible for informatisation, as well as coordinating the activities of digital media. Soon, Yanchevsky was nick-named ‘All-Belarusian IT administrator’. His appointment was welcomed by the IT community for his liberal reputation, advanced knowledge of IT and his experience as a member of HTP Supervisory Board.

In 2017, Vsevolod Yanchevsky was listed in the Top 50 most influential politicians in Belarus according to the "Nasha Niva".

=== Hi-Tech Park Director ===
On March 2, 2017, Yanchevsky was appointed Director of HTP. Under his direction, the Park showed a dramatic increase in performance, in 2017-21 attracting more than a 1000 of new companies and start-ups, while its exports grew 3.7 times. In 2021, it hit the record of $3.2 bln. Yanchevsky was one of the protagonists of the biggest liberalization step in the country's legislation: the revolutionary Decree No. 8 "On the Development of Digital Economy" which was signed on December 21, 2017, and enforced on March 28, 2018. The Decree facilitated the performance of IT companies, it significantly reduced the bureaucratic formalities, established legal basis for the circulation of digital currencies, legalized smart contracts, etc. The Park became a sandbox for blockchain startups offering tax exemptions and relying on elements of English law in commercial matters.

In April 2023, HTP was restructured and Yanchevsky's post ceased to exist.

According to Nasha Niva, in 2023 he headed a legal entity in the United Arab Emirates, which was opened as a financial gateway for HTP residents.

== Honors and achievements ==
- Letter of Appreciation from the President of the Republic of Belarus;
- Order of Honor.

== Family ==
Married in 1998, has a daughter.

== Sources ==
- Alachnovič, Aleś; Korosteleva, Julia (2022). "Stolen decades: the unfulfilled expectations of the Belarusian economic miracle". CASE Working papers (17 (141)).
