= Valery Tsepkalo =

Belarusian politician, diplomat, and activist (born 1965)

- Валерий Цепкало; Валерый Цэпкала
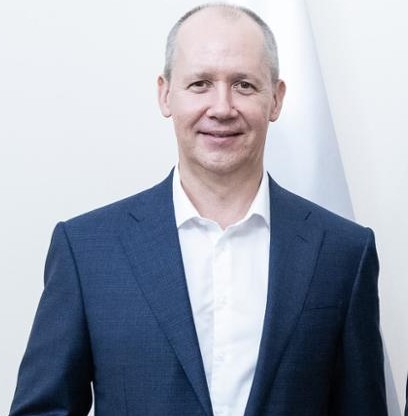
- Born: 22 February 1965 (age 61); Grodno, Byelorussian SSR, Soviet Union
- Education: Moscow State Institute of International Relations
- Occupations: Politician, diplomat, executive, tech entrepreneur
- Spouse: Veronika Tsepkalo
- Children: 2
- Website: tsepkalo.com

Valery Vilyamovich Tsepkalo or Valery Vilyamavich Tsepkala (Russian: Валерий Вильямович Цепкало; Belarusian: Валерый Вільямавіч Цэпкала; born 22 February 1965) is a Belarusian politician and entrepreneur. After graduating from the Moscow State Institute of International Relations with a doctoral degree in international law and serving in the embassy of the Soviet Union in Finland, Tsepkalo joined the staff of the Belarusian Ministry of Foreign Affairs. He later became an advisor on foreign political and economic relations to the Chairman of the Belarusian Parliament, Stanislav Shushkevich, and then a senior advisor to the Secretary General of the Commonwealth of Independent States.

He led Alexander Lukashenko's presidential campaign in the 1994 election and later took the post of First Deputy Minister of Foreign Affairs. From 1997 to 2002, Tsepkalo was the Belarusian Ambassador to the United States and Mexico. In 2005–2006 he was Presidential Plenipotentiary Envoy in the Parliament. In 2005 he established the Belarus High Technologies Park (HTP), and led it until 2017.

In May 2020, Tsepkalo joined the presidential race. He was considered to be a major challenger to incumbent president Alexander Lukashenko, who invalidated the majority of Tsepkalo's nomination signatures to bar him from running for president. In April 2023, he received a 17-year prison sentence in absentia. He acquired Albanian citizenship on 11 April 2025 along with his wife Veronika.

== Early life ==
Valery Tsepkalo was born in Grodno on 22 February 1965. He was the only child of chemical engineers William and Nina Tsepkalo, who came to Grodno to build the Grodno Azot nitrogen plant, where they worked all their lives. His father graduated from Odesa Polytechnic Institute, and his mother graduated from Kharkiv Engineering-Economic Institute.

Valery graduated from Grodno Secondary School No.14 with an advanced study of the English language. In 1982 he entered the Belarusian State Technological University in Minsk, but in 1984 he was drafted into the army and served in the Strategic Missile Forces for two years. Due to the Soviet–Afghan War, the deferment for university students at the time was lifted.

After completing his military service, Tsepkalo entered the Moscow State Institute of International Relations of the Soviet Ministry of Foreign Affairs and graduated with honors in 1991. He pursued a postgraduate program there, graduated with honors as well, lectured at MGIMO, and obtained his PhD degree in International Law.

== Diplomatic career ==
Tsepkalo started his diplomatic career in 1991 as a member of the Soviet Embassy in Finland. After the dissolution of the Soviet Union, he returned to Belarus and in 1992 took the position of second secretary in the Ministry of Foreign Affairs of Belarus. In 1993–1994 he was a foreign policy adviser to the Chairman of the Supreme Soviet Stanislav Shushkevich, who had a position of the President (Head of the State) at that time. After the resignation of Stanislav Shushkevich from the post of the Chairman of the Supreme Council of Belarus, the position of an advisor on foreign political and economic relations was replaced by the advisor on agriculture. Later Shushkevich recalled Tsepkalo as a "skillful psychologist and professional" and appreciated his help in times when Shushkevich was in disfavour. After resigning, Tsepkalo moved to work in the Commonwealth of Independent States Secretariat as an advisor to the Executive Secretary.

In 1994 during the presidential elections Tsepkalo left Shushkevich and joined the team of Alexander Lukashenko on the recommendation of Dmitry Bulakhov. Viktar Hanchar, Leonid Sinitzin and Alyaksandr Feduta, Yuri Zakharenko were also in Lukashenko's team. Tsepkalo was in charge of international affairs. He organized Lukashenko's trip to the Russian State Duma in Moscow where Lukashenko met head of the Communist Party of the Russian Federation Gennady Zyuganov, head of the Agrarians Nikolay Kharitonov, and Liberal Democratic Party of Russia leaders. The trip allowed Lukashenko claim an advantage over other candidates for the presidency regarding Russia–Belarus integration.

In August 1994 Tsepkalo was appointed First Deputy Minister of Foreign Affairs. He participated in the fulfilment of Soviet obligations on the START-II Treaty, the reduction of conventional forces in Europe, "Partnership for Peace" between NATO and former Soviet Republics, and the Cooperative Threat Reduction Treaty. He co-chaired with William J. Perry, the US Secretary of Defense, a joint US-Belarus commission to dismantle nuclear, chemical and biological weapons and associated infrastructure in the former Soviet States. He also co-chaired the joint commissions on border delimitation and demarcation with Lithuania and Latvia. He was also involved in the preparation of the Budapest Memorandum on Security Assurances according to which the United States, Russia, and the United Kingdom guaranteed the territorial integrity of three newly independent states that voluntarily refused to possess nuclear weapons and joined the Non-Proliferation Treaty.

From 1997 to 2002 he was the Ambassador of Belarus to both the United States and Mexico. While ambassador, he visited Silicon Valley and realized the importance of brain drain problem.

After diplomatic service in the US, Tsepkalo became the presidential adviser on science and technologies. During this period he worked as an Alternate Governor of Belarus to the International Monetary Fund and the World Bank and from February to October 2005 he was a representative in the National Assembly of Belarus. In 2005, he became the Governmental Expert for Secretary-General of the United Nations on communication and information technologies and data security. In 2009 he also joined the Global Alliance for Information and Communication Technologies and Development.

== High Tech Park ==
The idea to establish a Belarusian Silicon Valley first appeared when Tsepkalo was visiting Silicon Valley during his diplomatic service in the USA. He was impressed by the effectiveness of the ecosystem, which stimulated the development of technology companies. According to Tsepkalo, it took him a year and a half to persuade the Belarusian authorities to establish infrastructure and a centre of attraction for Belarusian IT companies. On the backdrop of the bursting of the Dot-com bubble, the establishment was very skeptical about the IT industry. He later described his work on popularization of high technologies among public officials in his book Belarus Hi-Tech Park: 10 Years of Development.

Lukashenko announced the creation of the High Tech Park in 2003, and saw it as a modernization tool to boost industries such as agriculture, education, health care and military defense. In July 2004, the head of the Presidential Administration Ural Latypov and Tsepkalo gave an online press conference where they described the future park's concept. The organization was established on 22 September 2005, and on 7 October 2005 Tsepkalo received the director's post. He saw the park as a tool to stop IT experts leaving the country, and as an enabling environment for Belarusian start-ups. In 2009 he called the park the "Belarusian Silicon Valley".

In 2005 the authorities provided 50 hectares of land near Uručča district in Minsk. In ten years the campus grew into a scientific-research centre with offices, conference centres, apartments, hotels and shopping malls. The government guaranteed a one-year $300,000 loan with a 17% interest rate to help get it up and running, which the HTP paid back in two years. The export performance was expected to reach $300–350 million by 2015. A special preferential tax regime was introduced for the HTP.

By 2014, 138 companies were registered in the Park, and its total production reached $650 million. The public image of programming careers rose rapidly; some public schools initiated additional education courses in it. According to Tsepkalo, IT industry growth in Belarus surpassed the world average several times and the HTP's net export exceeded the total of the national industrial plants.

In 2015 a conflict erupted between the government and the HTP administration when the authorities announced a 1% tax raise and tripled its contribution to the Social Security Fund. Tsepkalo warned the authorities of the brain drain danger and referred to data that even with reduced taxes a programmer from HTP paid three times the national average tax. The tax rates were locked until 2020 based on the agreement that the companies from HTP would benefit not only the IT industry but the Belarusian economics in general. Apart from the active defence of HTP residents and employees' interests, Tsepkalo supported detained IT entrepreneurs on multiple occasions. In 2016, he voted for the removal of an "illegal business practices" law from the Criminal Code of Belarus, saying that the rule was "a relic of the Soviet-era" that undermined Belarusian developers' position on foreign markets. Aliaksandr Kaniuk, who was the Prosecutor General then, declared that he was obliged to follow the letter of the law.

On 2 March 2017, Tsepkalo was dismissed from the director's post at the HTP by presidential decree. The news came without warning for HTP employees. According to Tsepkalo, his dismissal was in fact provoked by his active social position and a conflict with security officials. By early 2017 the software development industry annual turnover in Belarus reached $1 billion, with such companies as Wargaming.net, Maps.me, Viber among the HTP membership. In comparison to Ukraine's outsource industry, the Belarusian market was growing 9% faster, while the tax burden was three times higher. The total share of Belarus on the global market reached several basis points. According to the media, Tsepkalo's dismissal had been grounded on his unwillingness to redirect the HTP companies towards the development of other Belarusian industries. Noting Tsepkalo's merits in the creation and development of the HTP, analysts paid attention to its weaknesses: selectivity of the HTP residents, prevalence of outsourcing developers, excessive bureaucratization, and officialism.

After Tsepkalo left the HTP leadership, he was criticised by his successors. The new HTP director Vsevolod Yanchevski said in a media interview that Tsepkalo could have gone to prison even during his leadership of the HTP: charges of tax violations affected one of the companies, they were compensated and the case was closed.

After the HTP, Tsepkalo continued his career in international consulting on innovative enterprises. He consulted governments of the former USSR countries on the establishment of strong IT clusters and took part in a large IT project in Saudi Arabia. He contributed to the development of the Mirzo Ulugbek Innovation Center (ICSU) in Uzbekistan. In 2018 he founded Prabook.com, an online biographical library. His first active comeback to the Belarusian media was in 2018 when he commented on the intended growth of the HTP members' number. According to Tsepkalo, such a step would significantly damage the quality of provided services. Nevertheless, in 2018 HTP got 15 thousand new employees. By 2020, more than 25% of Belarusian start-ups resided in the HTP, innovative technologies accounted for more than a third of country's export.

== Presidential campaigns ==
=== 1994 presidential campaign ===
During the 1994 presidential campaign, Tsepkalo joined the team of Alexander Lukashenko, who was the youngest candidate in the race. Tsepkalo was in charge of international affairs. He organized Lukashenko's visit to Moscow, where he visited the State Duma and met with senior officials of the Liberal Democratic Party of Russia, the Agrarian Party of Russia, and the Communist Party of the Russian Federation. The trip was intended to disavow the Kebich team's statements that Lukashenka was going to break off relations with Russia. After Lukashenko's victory, Tsepkalo continued his diplomatic career.

=== 2020 presidential campaign ===
Tsepkalo announced his run for the Belarusian presidency on 8 May 2020, on his Facebook page. He called the existing regime "a dysfunctional system when the whole nation daily monitors the mood of one person". Tsepkalo affirmed his candidacy on 12 May, with a statement that society demanded reforms and the decades of Lukashenko's presidency had led the country into stagnation and indifference. In the meantime, HTP used a phone tree among the employees to emphasize Lukashenko's contribution to the enterprise's success.

Tsepkalo reiterated the need to modernize the economy, end the state assistance to inefficient enterprises, and increase investments in education and health industries. He offered to use the experience of Scandinavia and modernize Belarusian thermal power stations instead of building a nuclear power plant. Tsepkalo explained that the "battles for harvests" were useless and the most harm to economics was made by ineffective and outdated management. He promoted Court and Parliament independence, offered to reject the presidential system, and introduce a two-term limit for presidents. He stated his intention to establish a proper environment for education and life. He said that "Lukashenko was detached from society and unaware of people's needs and expectations". He cultivated a public image of a technocrat, who intended to bring his experience in the IT industry into the government. He offered to implement a transparent decision-making mechanism as a way to root out corruption in the government. At his first press conference, he stated that he would pursue a multifaceted foreign policy with a priority of friendly terms with all countries. He supported the Union State initiative in case some parts of the agreement would be altered. He intended to develop better relations with both the US and the EU. He emphasized that he saw no stereotypical difference between Russians, Ukrainians, and Belarusians, and wanted to keep the high status of the Russian language in case of victory in the elections.

Political experts, analysts, and public activists had different opinions regarding Tsepkalo's run for presidency. 'Belhard' director Igor Mamonenko considered him to be a compromise candidate from the establishment. Some analysts from the IT industry believed that Tsepkalo was a decoy candidate, approved by the Presidential Administration. The Carnegie Moscow Center described the nomination of two liberal candidates (Tsepkalo and Viktar Babaryka) as a sign of the growing social discontent of the urban middle class, because both candidates offered programs of mild reforms and economic liberalization.

In May 2020 Lukashenko announced that he had incriminating materials on Tsepkalo, regarding the reasons for his dismissal from the director's post at HTP. However, Lukashenko refused to reveal them. In one of the interviews, Lukashenko compared Tsepkalo to a hog, alluding to his wife Veronika Tsepkalo's use of in vitro fertilisation t(IVF) reatment. Tsepkalo responded by saying that his dismissal was linked to his protest against businessmen detentions and consecutive conflicts with the General Prosecutor and Investigating Committee. Tsepkalo called Lukashenko's comments "an ordinary practice in the current political system" and explained them as an awkward attempt to raise his ratings. Tsepkalo announced that he wanted to "reintroduce respect, return respect to all Belarusians". He also said that Lukashenko's security should be guaranteed after his resignation.

On 20 May 2020, 884 activists were registered by the Central Election Commission of the Republic of Belarus and started a campaign to collect signatures in Tsepkalo's support. By early July they collected about 220,000 signatures, 160,000 were approved and provided to the Election Commission. The Commission said only 75,249 were valid — less than the 100,000 needed. The Commission also claimed a discrepancy between Veronika Tsepkalo's declared and actual income. Almost all the signatures were rejected only because the signers did not put in the date. Experts highlighted that it was actually impossible to perform a thorough graphological examination of thousands of signatures in several days. Tsepkalo's team believed the rejection was groundless, disputed the Committee decision and challenged it in the High Court, but without success. The Committee acknowledged violations only in Babruysk; the results in the rest of the regions were described as "not having any grounds to be doubted". When the voters applied for a reexamination of the collected signatures and documents, the Committee refused on the pretext that there were no such procedures. Tsepkalo could not make a public appearance because he was in isolation after COVID-19 exposure. Meanwhile, Veronika Tsepkalo explained the difference between her actual and declared incomes. According to her, the Election Committee announced her income before interest and taxes and also included incomes in kind.

The European Union described the decision to deny Babariko and Tsepkalo spots on the ballot as "seemingly arbitrary." EU foreign policy chief Josep Borell said that it "limits the possibility for the Belarusian people to express their will and already undermines the overall integrity and democratic nature of the elections." According to the political analyst Pavel Usov, the authorities decided to remove Tsepkalo from the ballot first to disorient people and to create an illusion that Babaryka could succeed.

On 24 July 2020, Tsepkalo fled to Russia, Ukraine, then Poland and finally to Latvia with his children after receiving a tip that his arrest was imminent and the authorities were prepared to strip him of parental rights. In Minsk, Pruzhany, Gomel, and Brest people took to the streets in support of Babaryka and Tsepkalo. Large-scale detentions followed. On 16 June three opposition forces teamed up under the leadership of Maria Kalesnikava, Veronika Tsepkalo and Sviatlana Tsikhanouskaya, who had entered the race for the presidency after the detention of her husband, candidate Sergei Tikhanovsky. The united opposition called upon the people to vote and announced their intention to fight for an honest and open presidential election.

== Criminal prosecution ==
To finance the election campaign Tsepkalo sold his 418.3 m^{2} house on leaseback terms but did not stop using the premises. On 24 June 2020, a Belarusian businessman of Turkish origin Sedat Igdegji turned to the General Prosecutor's office with a lawsuit against Tsepkalo. According to Igdegji, when Tsepkalo was the director of HTP, he accepted a $200 thousand bribe in the form of building the mansion and $1 mln in cash and secured Igdegji a win of a construction contract for HTP. When Igdegji refused to pay additional money, Tsepkalo allegedly facilitated the annulment of the company's license. Igdegji claimed that he had $15 mln losses. Igdegji witnessed that Tsepkalo in private mentioned his offshores in Cyprus. Answering these accusations, Tsepkalo stated that Igdegji's company failed to uphold the tasks and was suspended by Prime Minister Mikhail Myasnikovich. Both sides accused each other of perjury and offense. In the letter to the General Prosecutor Igdegji claimed that his family members and he had received threats, though allegedly the sue had no connection to Tsepkalo's political activity. Igdegji confirmed that he reported the bribery with a few years delay and tried to prevent Tsepkalo from using the money on his election campaign. Tsepkalo believed the sue was a deliberate provocation. No Tsepkalo's representatives visited the first court session.

On 8 February 2021 the Investigative Committee of Belarus sent General Prosecutor's Office a request for Tsepkalo's extradition. He was accused of corruption and bribery. On 11 February 2021 the Latvian General Prosecutor was noted and requested to extradite Tsepkalo. Same requests were made according several other opposition leaders who left abroad. On 7 July 2021 Latvia officially refused to give any of them out.

In October 2022, "a group of citizens united under the general leadership of Valery Tsepkalo" was recognized as an extremist formation by the Belarusian Ministry of Internal Affairs.

On 7 April 2023 Valery Tsepkalo was sentenced in absentia by a court in Belarus to 17 years of prison, a fine and a five-year ban on holding public office.

== Exile ==
On 24 July 2020, Tsepkalo left for Moscow, fearing that he would be jailed and the children would be taken away from the family. Tsepkalo explained that the prosecutors visited his kids' school and initiated the procedures to deprive Veronika of her maternity rights. The authorities rejected these accusations. Knowing that the children could be used as a crackdown tool, Tsepkalo took them away from the country. During the investigations, the security forces detained and questioned Veronika and Tsepkalo's sister-in-law. The latter was detained at a parking lot by plain-clothes officers and for some time the relatives could not find or contact her.

Tsepkalo believed there were no reasons to extradite him from Russia but assured the readiness to come back to Belarus if the political situation heats up. For some time he made it a priority to give press conferences exposing the events in Belarus. He also wrote an open letter to more than 30 world leaders, including Donald Trump, Angela Merkel and Vladimir Putin, with a plea to help Belarus conduct honest elections.

On 2 August 2020, Tsepkalo moved to Kyiv, in a week followed by his wife. Her departure was urged by the detaining of Maria Kolesnikova, who was taken by mistake instead of Tsepkalo. Veronika Tsepkalo continued her political activity, she recorded a video statement with a claim to acknowledge Svetlana Tikhanovskaya an elected president and to stop 'the mayhem of violence'. To pursue these goals, on 11 August 2020 Tsepkalo announced the establishment of the 'National Salvation Committee'.

On 15 August 2020, a criminal case was brought against Tsepkalo, in Russia and Belarus a warrant was issued for his arrest. Tsepkalo called the case against him politically motivated and not supported by evidence. On the next day, Tsepkalo announced his plans to move to Poland and meet some influential politicians. He also announced the establishment of the 'National Salvation Committee' to unite people against Lukashenko's seizure of power. On her way to Kyiv, Veronika Tsepkalo was detained by border guards and kept for three hours; the situation was perceived as a political crackdown. The reunited family came to Warsaw on 18 August.

In October 2020, Tsepkalo and his family moved to Riga, Latvia. Since August 2021 the family has lived in Greece.

On 6 January 2021 Tsepkalo announced the creation of the Belarusian Democratic Forum that will be held online in response to the decision to convene the All Belarusian People's Assembly.

On 27 May 2021, soon after the Ryanair Flight 4978 incident and Roman Protasevich's arrest, Tsepkalo announced a new public initiative that crownfunded a reward for those military or civil activists who would capture 'N1 criminal', meaning Alexander Lukashenko.

== Criticism ==
On 12 May 2020, Belarusian IT-media Dev.by accused Valery Tsepkalo of pressuring the edition. According to Dev.by, in 2016 Tsepkalo was displeased with its publications and urged HTP companies to cease collaboration. The edition also stated that Tsepkalo tried to intimidate TUT.by editors office and personally the editor-in-chief Yuri Zisser. Tsepkalo denied all accusations and explained that as the director of HTP he was unhappy with articles on Dev.by which persuaded the programmers to emigrate. A lot of readers reacted to the controversial articles and commented on subjectivity and timing of the publications.

On 8 May 2020, Tsepkalo announced his run for presidency. Soon he gave an interview to Dev.by. As stated by the editors office, later Tsepkalo called off the text of the interview and sent with a courier a censored version with only 8 answers to the journalist's question, instead of 30. He also enclosed a written prohibition to publish the original version.

== Prabook ==
In November 2018, Valery Tsepkalo introduced Prabook.com, a biographical library that was created to secure "digital immortality". At launch, the project had the world's largest biographical database. The developers claimed that the machine-generated library is based on open-source texts and images. The project faced a controversial reception for its potential identity hazard because data were aggregated without permissions of affected people. As disclosed later, Tsepkalo used his director position to make HTP employees work on Prabook.

== Research and publications ==
Tsepkalo published three books:

- By the Road of Dragon, a book on economic development of newly industrialized nations of South-East Asia;
- Man Everlasting, a book dedicated to mysteries of death and resurrection;
- Hi-Tech Park: 10 Years of Development.

Tsepkalo published 80 articles on religion, world economy, and foreign policy, 20 articles on e-government, information technology, and intellectual property, including publications in Foreign Affairs.

He holds a patent on the method of searching people based on collateral features, that is used in Prabook project.

In 1998 he published an essay "The Remaking of Eurasia" in the Foreign Affairs magazine devoted to different conflict scenarios on the Eurasian continent, where predicted the failure of modernization in Russia and the possible conflict between Russia and Ukraine. He discussed the Russian way of privatization of state assets that resulted in the appearance of oligarchs with the former National Security advisor Zbignew Brzezinski, and foreign policy challengers for the New Independent States with the future National Security Advisor John Bolton. He had many discussions with Ian Bremmer, who was deeply involved in political risk assessments in the Newly Independent States.

== Family ==
Married to Veronika Tsepkalo. The couple has two children.

== Awards ==
- The Order of Honor was granted to Tsepkalo on 23 June 2014, for 'many years of fruitful work, exemplary performance, achieving high results in car industry, construction, agriculture; significant personal contribution to IT development, healthcare, social security, trading, sciences, art, sports, and culture'.
