= Belarus High Technologies Park =

Science park in Belarus

Belarus Hi-Tech Park (HTP) is a tax and legal regime in Belarus, often referred to as the "Silicon Valley of Eastern Europe". Established in 2005, the Park operates under the provisions of the Belarusian Decree No. 8 "On the Development of the Digital Economy" and offers its resident companies a significant amount of preferences: until January 1, 2049, residents of the Park are exempt from most taxes, including value-added tax and income tax. Their employees have a 30% reduction in personal income tax. HTP operates on the principle of extraterritoriality: the companies registered in it can enjoy all the advantages provided, regardless of the location of their Belarusian office. As of 22 September 2023, 1000 resident companies with over 60,000 employees were registered in the HTP.

The IT sector in general and specifically the HTP as its leader became the driver of the Belarusian economy in 2005-2020. In 2016, mobile applications developed by HTP residents were used by more than 1 bln people in more than 150 countries. By 2021, computer services accounted for 30% of the country's total exports. In 2020, HTP export reached $2.7 bln and hit the record $3.2 bln in 2021.

Through the years, HTP has been actively engaged in supporting innovative entrepreneurship as well as IT education for children and adults, launching and leading numerous courses and initiatives.

== History ==
=== HTP ===
The initiative of creating a Belarusian analogue of the Silicon Valley was put forward by Valery Tsepkalo and Mikhail Myasnikovich. On 22 September 2005, the President of the Republic of Belarus Alexander Lukashenko signed the Decree "On the Hi-Tech Park". Arkadiy Dobkin's and Leo Lozner's EPAM Systems became HTP's first resident company. At that point, Belarusian economy was in recession and required modernization as well as stronger connection to the world market. The HTP was designed as one of the important drivers to bring the Belarusian economy into the international arena, which would help attract foreign investments and projects to the country. As stated by researchers Alachnovič and Korosteleva, it "effectively marked the establishment of the Information and Communication Technology (ICT) industry in Belarus".

In 2013, HTP production volume amounted to $527 mln. By 2014, Park's residents had such clients as Barclays, Bank of America, Citibank, Western Union, the London Stock Exchange, Google, IBM, Expedia, BP, Chevron, Microsoft and Airbus, and many more. Some major international companies as Yandex and Google opened R&D centres in Belarus.

In 2013-18, the number of HTP resident companies was growing steadily by 12-15 new projects and 3000 employees per year. The average salary in HTP was almost four times more than the average in Belarus. The Park became a driver for the explosive growth of the Belarusian IT sector. Already in 2016, mobile applications developed by HTP residents were used by more than 1 billion people in more than 150 countries. According to HTP management, in 2016 HTP-developed software was delivered to customers in 67 countries, with 49.1% of exports going to Western Europe and 43.2% to the US.

=== HTP-2 ===
Appointed on March 2, 2017, Vsevolod Yanchevsky is referred to as the main figure behind the break-through in HTP performance. Famous for his liberal views, Yanchevsky initiated the work on modernization of Belarusian law in regards to the IT sector. This work was embodied in a single document: the presidential Decree on Development of Digital Economy. Passed in December 2017, the Decree further facilitated the performance of IT companies, it significantly reduced the bureaucratic formalities, established legal basis for the circulation of digital currencies, legalized smart contracts, etc. A new period in the history of HTP, the so-called HTP-2, is counted from this moment. The Park became a sandbox for blockchain startups offering tax exemptions and relying on elements of English law in commercial matters. As of 2017, the list of HTP residents included Wargaming, Viber, Apalon, MSQRD, Maps.me, Prisma, IBA Group, Intetics, Itransition, and many more. Six HTP residents were included into the 2017 Global Outsourcing 100 list: EPAM Systems, IBA Group, Ciklum, Intransition, Intetics, Bell Integrator.

The year 2018 was marked by explosive growth of HTP development. At that point, the IT sector contributed to 5.5% of the country's GDP. In 9 months of 2018, since the entry into force of the provisions of Decree No. 8, the HTP accepted about 200 new companies. In the first half of 2018, the HTP exports, excluding new companies, totalled BRL 1.4 billion, 40% higher than in 2017. 91.9% of the software produced in the Park was exported. In November 2018, the HTP management also approved documents that detailed the work of the cryptocurrency industry. Very soon, several cryptocurrency trading platform and dozens of blockchain-based startups were registered in HTP, effectively turning the country into a major crypto hub.

In 2019, Belarusian IT sector was thriving. In May 2019, 505 HTP residents exported IT services to almost 70 countries around the world. In April 2020, 818 companies with a total number over 61,000 employees were registered in HTP. Such support for the IT sector in 2019 increased the share of the IT sector, which provided half of the GDP growth. The export of IT services in 2017–2019 increased by 2.4 times. Production growth in the first half of 2019 reached 166%, while the total export of services of HTP residents exceeded $2 billion. At the end of the first half of 2020, the park's export volumes increased by 40% compared to the same period in 2019.

In the early 2020, US Secretary of State Michael Pompeo visited the Hi-Tech Park and shared a positive review on his Twitter: "Inspired by what I saw at Hi-Tech Park Belarus. A great example of how Belarus can seize its extraordinary growth potential by embracing forward-looking economic policies and smart regulation. It’s clear how impactful American investment can foster prosperity across the globe". The year also was marked with a record $2.7 bln export of Belarusian IT sector.

In January 2020, the HTP had a total of 758 companies with more than 58 thousand employees. In April 2020, the number of resident companies in the Park was 818 with a total of more than 61 thousand employees. In July 2020, the number of residents of the Park increased by 71 companies. In October 2020, another 83 companies became residents of the Hi-Tech Park. Thus, in October 2020, the number of residents of the Park totals 969 companies, which employ more than 65 thousand specialists.

Computer Services Exports
	2006	2011	2016	2017	2018	2019	2020	2021	2022
Total export of computer services in Belarus, mln USD	47,9	274,1	956,8	1456,4	1853	2299,5	2685	3022.4	
Share of computer services in Belarus total exports	2%	5%	14%	18,6%	18%	21,9	29.5%	30%	
HTP exports, mln USD	21,9	215,2	820,6	1025	1414	2200	2700	3200	2700
Share of HTP in Belarus computer services exports	46%	79%	86%	70,38%	76,3%	87%			

=== 2020-present ===
The scandalous 2020 presidential election and the following crackdown compromised the progress in the country's economic transformation and undermined the performance of HTP. In 2020-21, not less than 15,000 IT specialists left the country. Still, in March 2021, 65 new companies were registered as HTP residents. In 2021, HTP residents exported services for a sum of more than $3.2 billion.

The second wave of IT workers' migration took place after the 2022 Russian invasion of Ukraine. Such major HTP residents as Wargaming, PandaDoc, and EPAM relocated entire businesses and closed Belarusian offices. Others, like Softswiss, Flo, WorkFusion, OneSoil, Wannaby, Kreosoft and Playtika, helped to relocate most employees or downsized operations. According to Dev.by, more than 170 companies and 22,000 specialists left HTP in 2022-23. 2022 became the first year in HTP history when the export declined in comparison to the previous year with a $700 mln drop. In 2022-23, the contribution of HTP residents to Belarus' gross domestic product has fallen to about 4% from 4.8%.

On 12 April 2023, Lukashenko signed a decree No. 102 "On Development of the High Technologies Park". According to it, the Park's Administration was restructured, a new Secretariat body was created to take charge of interaction with foreign partners and expanding to new markets. Together with the old legal entity, Yanchevsky's position also ceased to exist, he was dismissed and replaced by Alexander Bazanov, a former KGB officer. As before, Administration of HTP reports to the Council of Ministers. However, the Decree No.102 also made the Secretariat responsible for interacting with state military officials, among the rest, in questions of "recruitment for service in special IT units". In 2023, HTP had around 1000 resident companies and more 60,000 employees.

In 2024, the Administration of HTP added a new clause to the contract with residents. It obliges them to prevent ‘the dissemination of information discrediting the Republic of Belarus’. As explained by the journalists, it is basically a ban on revealing any information on working conditions in Belarus.

== Profile ==
=== Management ===
HTP is headed by the Director of the HTP Administration. Two Boards manage the Park: the Expert Board and the Supervisory Board. HTP's Administration is subordinate to the President of the Republic of Belarus and reports to the Council of Ministers. It's a legal entity at the national level and a nonprofit state institution. HTP's Administration is responsible for creating conditions favorable for HTP residents, promoting domestic and foreign investments in information technologies and creating a modern infrastructure.

In 2005-2017, HTP was directed by one of its co-founders, Valery Tsepkalo. On March 2, 2017, Vsevolod Yanchevsky was appointed HTP's Director, following the dismissal of Valery Tsepkalo. At that point, Park's Supervisory Board was chaired by Inessa Kontsevaya and included Mikhail Batura, Mikhail Kovalev, Alexander Kurbatski, Victor Laptev (Deputy Chairman of the Minsk City Executive Committee), Anna Ryabova (Deputy Minister of Communications and Informatization), Alexander Tuzikov (General Director of the United Institute of Informatics Problems of the National Academy of Sciences of Belarus), Dmitry Shedko – First Deputy Minister of Communications and Informatization, Konstantin Shulgan (Deputy Head of the Operative Analytical Center Under the President of the Republic of Belarus).

In August 2023, a former KGB officer Alexander Bazanov became the new director of HTP, he was appointed Head of the Secretariat of the Park's Supervisory Board.

In May 2025 it was reported that Anna Ryabova was appointed head of the Secretariat of the Supervisory Board of the Hi-Tech Park; from March 2016 she served as Deputy Minister of Communications and Informatization of Belarus, overseeing digital development.

=== Infrastructure ===
Despite the extraterritorial principle of registration of resident companies, HTP has a headquarters in Minsk with a total of 50 hectares of land for the further construction. The territory of Hi-Tech Park is located near the main thoroughfares of the capital: the central avenue, the Minsk ring road, the road to the National International Airport (distance to the airport is 40 km), and the Berlin-Minsk-Moscow railway line. According to the general development plan, HTP should become a high-tech city with comfortable conditions for the inhabitants to live, work and rest in.

As of 2022, HTP district included several office buildings of major resident companies, a residential area with several multi floor buildings, a kindergarten and a primary school, and a shopping mall. Visiting the district in 2022, blogger Denis Blishch discovered that it contrasted radically with HTP's concept that is based on innovations and progress. The district has inherited all the typical mistakes of Soviet mass housing, public spaces and urban design are non-existent.

=== Educational initiatives ===
HTP is active in the promotion of technical education. On 12 January 2012, an India-Belarus Digital Learning Centre named after Rajiv Gandhi was opened. The Centre is dedicated to train IT-specialists and to upgrade qualification of the professors of Belarusian technical universities.

With the participation of HTP residents, HTP Educational Center was established to provide re-education for adults who wanted to start a career in the IT industry, as well as training for employees of IT companies willing to enhance their knowledge and skills. 1,629 people received training there in 2016, with 340 of them getting jobs in HTP companies. For children of 6–15, HTP launched the iTeen Academy. Since 2019, the HTP has been publishing an electronic guide to applicants for IT specialties. In 2021-22, more than 9000 kids from 50 state kindergartens participated in HTP's initiative "IT for beginners: Informatics without a socket".

As a part of long-term collaboration, in 2021, HTP resident companies supported about 80 joint laboratories in Belarusian technical universities. By 2023, this number has grown up to 90. Every summer, HTP hosts an 'IT-vacations' initiative that helps high school students get to know the HTP work environment.

== See also ==
- Decree on Development of Digital Economy

== Sources ==
- Zlotnikov, Leonid (2009). "The Belarusian 'economic miracle' – illusions and reality" (PDF). European Union Institute for Security Studies.
- Alachnovič, Aleś; Korosteleva, Julia (2022). "Stolen decades: the unfulfilled expectations of the Belarusian economic miracle". CASE Working papers (17 (141)).
- Kolkin, Dzmitry (2018). "Belarus: Comparative Research on Industrial Parks and Special Economic Zones" (PDF). European Bank for Reconstruction and Development.
