= Viktor Prokopenya =

British entrepreneur and investor

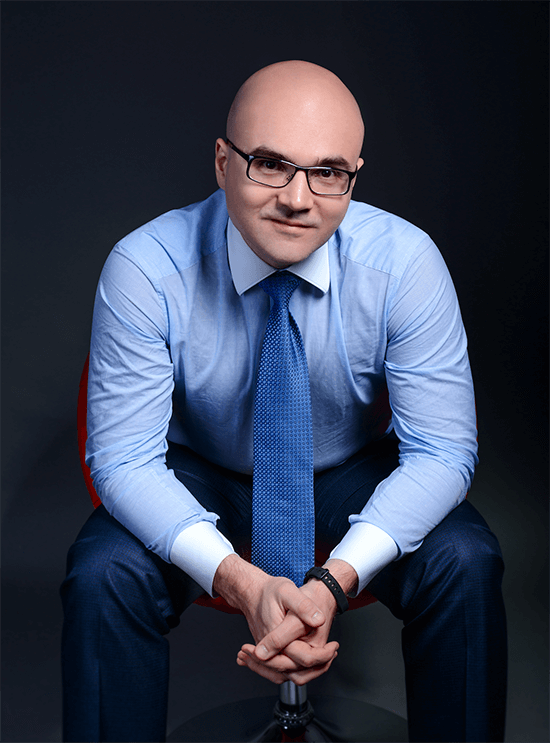
- Born: July 21, 1983 (age 43); Minsk, Byelorussian Soviet Socialist Republic
- Occupation: Executive Director at VP Capital (2012—present)

Viktor Prokopenya (Belarusian: Віктар Міхайлавіч Пракапеня; born 21 July 1983 in Minsk, Byelorussian SSR) is a Belarusian and British technology entrepreneur and investor. He began his career as a technology entrepreneur in 2001, and since 2011 has been investing in fintech companies, including Capital.com. He has been a visiting professor at the University of Leeds since 2023 and a trustee of the Natural History Museum in London since 2026.

== Education ==
Viktor Prokopenya was born on 21 July 1983 in Minsk to a family of scientists: his mother was a mathematician, and his father held a doctorate in physical and mathematical sciences, working at the Belarusian State University and later at the Belarusian National Technical University. He attended School No. 2 and School No. 130, graduating from the latter with distinction. He earned a bachelor's degree in information technology from the European Humanities University (2004), a qualification in software development from the Belarusian State University of Informatics and Radioelectronics (2006), a bachelor's degree in law from the Belarusian State University (2010), and an MBA from the Minsk IPM Business School (2010). He continued his education in the United States, obtaining a master's degree in internet marketing from Full Sail University (2012), completing an executive education course in strategic marketing at the Stanford Graduate School of Business (2016), and earning a Master of Finance from Northeastern University in Boston (2016). In 2017, he completed his doctorate in business administration at SBS Swiss Business School.

== Entrepreneurship ==
=== Viaden Media ===
Viktor Prokopenya's father left the field of science to pursue a career in business. He died in a car crash when Viktor was 16. Upon his father's death, Viktor assumed responsibility for providing for his family. This led him into IT consulting, and in the early 2000s, he founded IT outsourcing developer Viaden Media, initially as an IT consultancy that developed web applications for major U.S. and European companies. By 2006, the company moved away from IT consulting to focus on product development.

From 2009, Viaden developed mobile applications for iPhone and iPad, creating over 100 top-rated apps like All-in Fitness, Smart Alarm Clock, and Yoga.com. For a long time, All-in Fitness was highly ranked in AppStore's Healthcare & Fitness category across 40+ countries. By 2011, Viaden had achieved over 200 million app installations, becoming Eastern Europe's largest mobile software developer. Prokopenya sold Viaden in 2011 to Playtech's founder for an estimated €95 million.

=== VP Capital ===
In 2012, Prokopenya founded VP Capital, an investment firm focused on the tech and fintech sectors. Some of its early investments included exp(capital), a fintech firm focused on developing solutions for banks and brokers. Exp(capital) was ranked the best employer in 2014, and IG Holdings later acquired its mobile app department. Prokopenya also established VP Capital Real Estate, focusing on central street assets. By 2017, the company had become Minsk's largest private owner of such real estate.

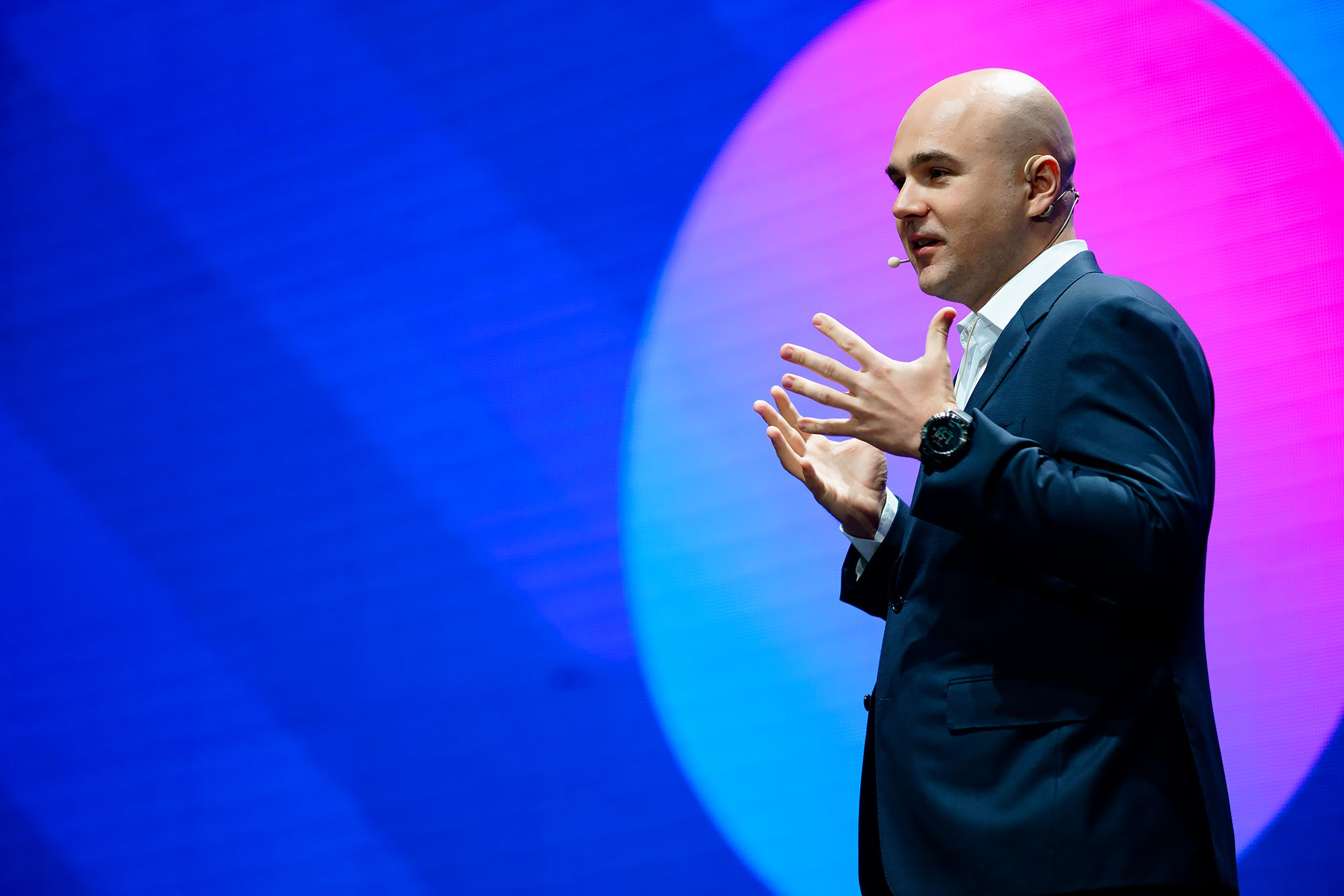
Viktor Prokopenya, May 2018

In 2017, VP Capital negotiated the acquisition of several Ukrainian and Belarusian banks, but Prokopenya subsequently postponed these plans due to poor market conditions. In December 2016, Larnabel Ventures Fund and VP Capital announced plans to invest in computer vision, augmented reality, and AI startups. They reported several investment agreements between 2017 and 2019, but the two investors parted ways by 2021. Shortly after the split in 2021, VP Capital acquired Larnabel's shares in Capital.com and Currency.com, while Larnabel's shares in Banuba were sold to private investors and the management.

Prokopenya's current main project is Capital.com, launched in 2016. Capital.com is a global fintech firm providing online trading services in contracts for difference (CFDs), share dealing, futures trading, and options on futures. The company has subsidiaries in the UK, Cyprus, and Australia and is regulated by FCA (UK), CySEC (Cyprus), SCB (Bahamas), and ASIC (Australia). Capital.com positions itself as a fintech company using AI for online financial trading. By early 2023, Capital.com is the third largest broker in Europe and had 7 million accounts.

== Legal and social initiatives ==
Prokopenya participated in developing legislation aimed at stimulating the IT industry in Belarus. He began proposing for changes in 2017, which would later materialise into the Decree on Development of Digital Economy, designed to be a mutually beneficial legal framework for IT businesses in post-Soviet countries.

Prokopenya advocated for digitalizing schools, presenting 600 students with tablets in December 2018. In 2019, he proposed reforms to the state education system, including the introduction of electronic paperwork, virtual tutorials, personalized teaching methods, career guidance, and modernizing of teachers’ remuneration. He also pushed for greater focus on English in schools while supporting Belarusian language development with various sponsorships. He sponsors «Вяселка» (‘Vyaselka’) magazine for children, Jerzy Giedroyc Literary Award, and «Наша Гiсторыя» (‘Our History’) publication.

Prokopenya highlighted the limited number of IT specialists and low IT education levels among university graduates, proposing a $15 million initiative from the High Tech Park fund to support IT education, which would benefit thousands of students annually. However, authorities did not support these initiatives.

== Academic and public roles ==
In September 2023, Prokopenya became a visiting professor of Practice in Innovation and Entrepreneurship at the University of Leeds.

In 2026, Prokopenya was appointed a co-opted trustee of the Natural History Museum in London for a four-year term.

== Media relations ==
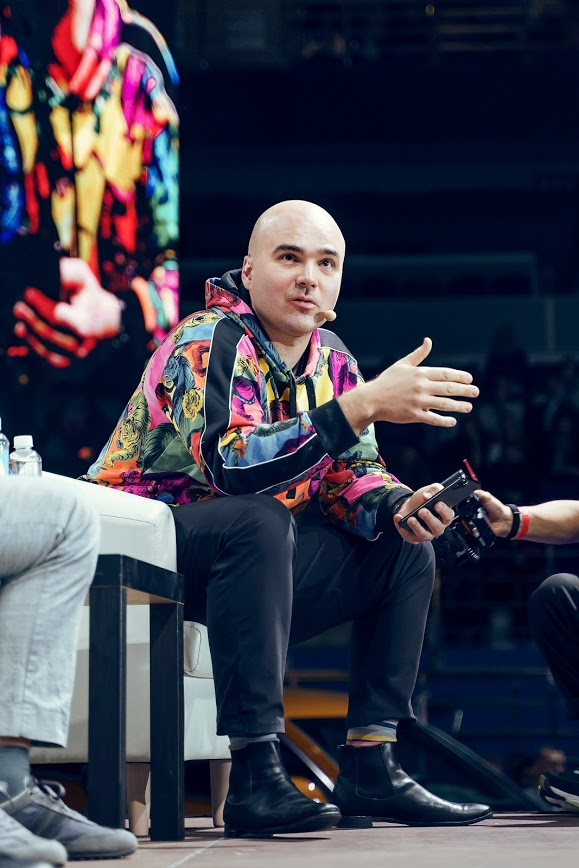
Viktor Prokopenya

Prokopenya has publicly defended independent media against state pressure. In 2018, he opposed blocking Charter 97 and Belarusian Partisan sites and asked Belarusian authorities to release detained journalists and editors from TUT.BY, BelaPAN, and other media outlets.

In the spring of 2015, Prokopenya was detained by Belarusian authorities for allegedly generating $650,000 of profits through unregistered business activity. He denied the allegations, and the IT community and media defended him. UK ambassador Bruce Bucknell called the case a 'disastrous sign.' Prokopenya was released on bail in late 2015, and all allegations were dropped in 2016. He then moved to London.

His story gained widespread press coverage in Belarus. In 2017, Prokopenya's legal advisors requested corrections to old publications containing inaccurate information. Some media complied, sparking discussion on journalistic ethics.

In 2017, VP Capital invested $500,000 in Dev.by media. In 2020, the authorities detained Dev.by's editor-in-chief Natalya Provalinskaya, and the team relocated to Ukraine, launching Dev.ua. In 2021, Prokopenya invested an additional $500,000 in a joint project with Dev.media. In 2022, Dev.by's director, Vitaly Andros, and his wife were detained in Belarus, with criminal charges announced later. Pro-government sources accused Andros of incitement to a coup and Dev.by of provoking negative sentiment against the Lukashenko regime.

== Charity ==
During the COVID-19 pandemic, Prokopenya criticized Lukashenko's authorities for ignoring the disease and not implementing quarantine measures. Prokopenya launched the 'Help the Doctors' initiative and donated $100,000 to fight the coronavirus.

After the scandalous 2020 Belarusian presidential election, Prokopenya condemned violence against protesters, donated $100,000 to victims of law enforcement abuse, and urged the business community to join this initiative. He, along with 300 IT CEOs, threatened to move their businesses out of the country if authorities didn't hold re-election and stop the violence. VP Capital allowed employees to leave the country and transfer to offices abroad.

After the 2022 Russian invasion of Ukraine, Prokopenya condemned the aggression. His company, Currency.com became the first trading platform to stop working with clients from Russia, facing a large-scale DDoS attack afterward. Prokopenya donated $1 million to Ukrainian relief efforts, distributed across four charity organizations. Prokopenya signed a VC and startup petition condemning the bloodshed in Ukraine and attended the Munich Security Conference in 2023.

In 2025, Capital.com, founded by Prokopenya, pledged £1.5 million to the University of Oxford's Saïd Business School to support a five-year research programme on improving financial literacy.

The Prokopenya Family Foundation is involved in children's education, helping disadvantaged families, and empowering young women.

== Personal life ==
Prokopenya resides in London. He holds British citizenship. His hobbies include diving, cycling, and reading.

== Publications ==
- Ben-David, Itzhak; Birru, Justin & Prokopenya, Viktor (2018). "Uninformative Feedback and Risk Taking" (PDF). Review of Finance. doi:10.1093/rof/rfy022.
