= List of Prisma (app) filters =

A picture of a cat processed via the Speed filter.

This is a list of filters for the photo-editing application Prisma to render images with an artistic effect.

== Artists ==
Artists represented through the app via the filters include Marc Chagall, Hokusai, Wassily Kandinsky, Roy Lichtenstein, Isaac Levitan, Hayao Miyazaki, Piet Mondrian, Alphonse Mucha, Edvard Munch, Francis Picabia, and Pablo Picasso.

== List of Prisma filters ==
Title	Description
Abstract Portrait	As of September 1, 2016, this filter was available in offline mode.
Aviator	
Bobbie	The filter is based on Canadian artist Bobbie Burger.
Candy	
Canyon	The filter is based on Hokusai's One Hundred Views of Mount Fuji.
Caribbean	
Coloured Sky	
Composition	
Curly Hair	As of September 1, 2016, this filter was available in offline mode.
Curtain	Stuff's Sam Kieldsen described it as one of the "Impressionist-style brush stroke filters."
Dallas	
Dancers in Blue	
Dancers in Pink	
Daryl Feril	As of September 1, 2016, this filter was available in offline mode.
Dreams	As of September 1, 2016, this filter was available in offline mode.
Electric	Stuff's Sam Kieldsen described it as one of the "Impressionist-style brush stroke filters."
Femme	Aussie Network News's Cat Suclo described the filter as "a smoothly painted over portrait."
Flame Flowers	
#FollowMeTo	The filter is based on Russian photographer Murad Osman.
#GettUrban	
Gothic	As of September 1, 2016, this filter was available in offline mode.
Heisenberg	This is intended for portraits that convert color images to black-and-white. Stuff's Sam Kieldsen described it as "a black-and-white ink sketch filter," while The Telegraph's Pramita Ghosh and Riddhima Khanna said it was "bold and heavy B&W strokes" suggesting not to use pictures with bad lighting. The filter uses an image of Walter White from television series Breaking Bad. As of September 1, 2016, this filter was available in offline mode.
Ice Cream	
Illegal Beauty	The filter is based on artist Natalie Ratkovski.
Impression	The filter was sponsored by soap-maker Palmolive.
Light Summer Reading	As of September 1, 2016, this filter was available in offline mode.
Love	The filter sets images to a philanthropic style and asks users to donate to the Elbi Charity. As of September 1, 2016, this filter was available in offline mode.
Marcus D – Lone Wolf	As of September 1, 2016, this filter was available in offline mode.
Mark	The filter is based on artist Marc Chagall.
MIOBI	Stuff's Sam Kieldsen described it as one of the "Impressionist-style brush stroke filters."
Mondrian	The filter is based on the artist Piet Mondrian.
Mononoke	The filter is based on Hayao Miyazaki's Princess Mononoke. Aussie Network News's Cat Suclo described the filter as "[i]f you’re feeling more artsy than usual but do not want a too abstract look." As of September 1, 2016, this filter was available in offline mode.
Mosaic	The filter is based on the artist Alphonse Mucha.
Paper Art	
Peace	
Raoul	The filter is based on artist Raoul Dufy.
Red Head	
Robots	
Roland	The filter is intended for landscape or scenery images.
Roy	The filter is based on Roy Lichtenstein's Go for Baroque. As of September 1, 2016, this filter was available in offline mode.
Running in the Storm	
The Scream	The filter is based on Edvard Munch's The Scream As of September 1, 2016, this filter was available in offline mode.
Speed	
Tears	Aussie Network News's Cat Suclo described the filter as "the modern newspaper dot-embossed effect."
Tokyo	The Times of India's Anandi Mishra as a "Japanese-themed" filter. As of September 1, 2016, this filter was available in offline mode.
Transverse Line	The filter is based on Wassily Kandinsky's Transverse Line. As of September 1, 2016, this filter was available in offline mode.
Udnie	The filter is based on Francis Picabia's Udnie.
Urban	As of September 1, 2016, this filter was available in offline mode.
Wave	The filter is based on Hokusai's The Great Wave off Kanagawa.
We can do it!	The filter is based on J. Howard Miller's We Can Do It!.

== Reception ==
In July 2016, Wiknix's Jay Bokhiria called Candy, Dreams, Gothic, Mosaic, and Roland the best Prisma filters. The Telegraph's Pramita Ghosh and Riddhima Khanna picked out five filters: Heisenberg, Marcus D – Lone Wolf, Mosaic, Roland, and Udnie. India TV said Bobbie, #FollowMeTo, Mondrian, The Scream, and Udnie were the best filters while "you can ignore the rest." Stuff's Sam Kieldsen favored the Curtain, Electric, and MIOBI filters with "work well with almost any sort of shot you use" as well as Heisenberg "can be brilliantly effective when used with the right base shot." However, Kieldsen critiqued the filters Impression and Mondrian with "rarely seem to produce anything worth looking at." The Kitchn's Ariel Knutson used the filters Candy, Gothic, Femme, Ice Cream, Mononoke, Mosaic, Raoul, Tokyo, and Udnie for various food photography. Knutson called Gothic "the most bold of all the filters." Knutson called Udnie "my favorite filter for the whole app." Aussie Network News's Cat Suclo ranked Femme, Mononoke, and Tears as the three best filters.

In August 2016, The Times of India's Anandi Mishra called Bobbie, #FollowMeTo, Mononoke, The Scream, Tokyo, and Udnie as popular filters.
