= DeepArt =

Art creation website

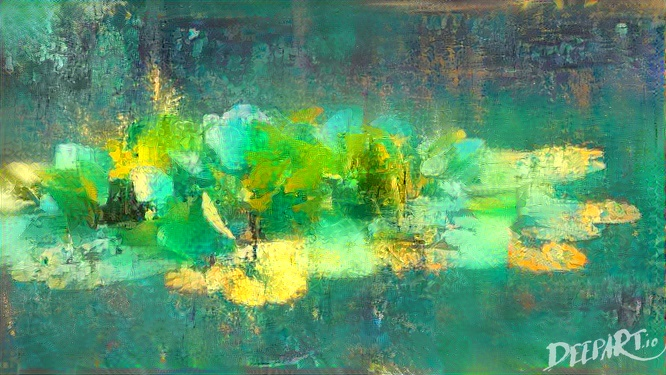
- Lillies in Green, taken in the Deadwater Valley, processed by DeepArt using the CAG green colours style
- Original authors: Matthias Bethge, Alex Ecker, Leon Gatys, Łukasz Kidziński, Michał Warchoł
- Developer: DeepArt UG (haftungsbeschränkt)
- Release: 1 October 2015; 11 years ago
- Operating system: Web application
- Type: Photo and video
- License: Freeware
- Website: deepart.io

DeepArt or DeepArt.io was launched as an online tool that allowed users to generate stylized images by combining the content of one image with the artistic style of another. The service was an early public implementation of neural style transfer, allowing non-technical users to experiment with machine learning-generated artwork. The website became inaccessible by August 2022.

== History ==
DeepArt was developed as an online platform that allowed users to create artistic images by using an algorithm to redraw one image using the stylistic elements of another image.

The service was based on a Neural Style Transfer algorithm derived from the research paper "A Neural Algorithm of Artistic Style".

Using the DeepArt platform, users uploaded a source image and selected another image to provide stylistic features. The algorithm then generated a new image that combined the content of the first image with the artistic style of the second, allowing users to create images resembling the styles of other artists.

The website became inaccessible sometime in or after August 2022.

A similar program, Prisma, later launched as an iOS and Android app, used comparable neural style transfer technology.

== See also ==
- Computational creativity
