= Veronika Tsepkalo =

Belarusian pro-democracy activist

- Вероника Цепкало; Вераніка Цэпкала
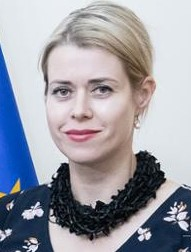
- Tsepkalo in 2020
- Born: 7 September 1976 (age 49); Mogilev, Byelorussian SSR, Soviet Union (now Belarus)
- Citizenship: Belarus
- Education: Belarus State Economic University
- Occupations: Business manager, political activist
- Spouse: Valery Tsepkalo
- Children: 2

Veronika Valeryevna Tsepkalo or Veranika Valereuna Tsepkala (Russian: Вероника Валерьевна Цепкало; Belarusian: Вераніка Валер’еўна Цэпкала; born 7 September 1976) is a Belarusian political activist.

== Early life ==
Tsepkalo's mother is Evgenia Shesterikova, sister is Natalya Leonyuk. Her grandfather Peter Shesterikov, was a writer, who has a street name in Mogilev named in his memory.

In 1998, Tsepkalo graduated from the Faculty of International Relations of the Belarus State University with a degree in International Relations. In 2004–2006 she studied at the Higher School of Management and Business of the Belarusian State Economic University. In 2008, she studied at the National Institute of Small and Medium Enterprises in Hyderabad, India.

Tsepkalo works as a business development manager for Microsoft.

== 2020 election activism ==
When Tsepkalo's husband Valery Tsepkalo (a former Belarusian ambassador to the United States) announced his participation in the 2020 Belarusian presidential election, Tsepkalo accompanied him on his trips. On 14 July 2020, Valery was denied registration as a presidential candidate in Belarus. Soon after that, the three chief opposition candidates—Valery Tsepkalo, Sviatlana Tsikhanouskaya, and Viktar Babaryka–united their campaigns. Since the unification of these campaigns, Veronica became her husband's representative at the campaign rallies of Tikhanovskaya, while Valery and his children left the country fearing for their safety. In addition, throughout the campaign, Veronica was constantly under pressure from the government: from collecting information in the school where children study. Her sister Natalia Leonyuk was summoned to testify against Valery Tsepkalo.

On 30 July 2020, during a rally in Minsk, Veronica spoke about the personal affairs of her family, and cited the falsification of a criminal case against her mother, who at that time was already in a serious medical condition. Fearing the loss of her freedom as a result of political persecution, she fled the country on the eve of the 2020 Belarusian presidential election, joining her husband in Moscow. She cast her vote at the Belarusian embassy in Moscow.

Following the rigged August 2020 presidential election, in which incumbent President Alexander Lukashenko declared victory, Tsepkalo said that the "only legitimate President is Svetlana Tikhanovskaya" and called upon other countries to recognize Tikhanovsakaya as the legitimately elected president of Belarus.

On 19 August 2020, it was reported that Tsepkalo was in Poland with her husband and children. As of October 2022 Tsepkalo and her family remained in exile in Poland.

In the summer of 2024, the Belarusian authorities sentenced Veronika Tsepkalo in absentia to 12 years in prison.

== Awards ==
The International Republican Institute (IRI) honored Tsepkalo with its John S. McCain Freedom Award (2020), and its Jeane J. Kirkpatrick Award (2021); the latter award recognizes contributions to the advancement of women in politics and civil society. She received the German Lutherstadt's Das unerschrockene Wort ("The intrepid word") prize (2021)

In 2021, the European Parliament honored the democratic Belarusian opposition by collectively awarding it the 2020 Sakharov Prize; Tsepkalo was one of the representatives of the honorees.

Svetlana Tikhanovskaya, Maria Kolesnikova, and Tsepkalo were awarded the Csoklich Democracy Prize by the Styria Media Group in 2021. The same three Belarusian opposition leaders were awarded the International Association of Political Consultants Democracy Medal (2021), and the Charlemagne Prize (2022).
