= Decree on Development of Digital Economy =

2017 Belarusian presidential decree

- Ratified: 21 December 2017
- Signatories: Alexander Lukashenko
- Purpose: to liberalize the conditions for conducting business in the sphere of high technologies in the Republic of Belarus

The Decree No. 8 'On the Development of Digital Economy' is a presidential decree in Belarus that created favourable legal conditions for the information technology (IT) sector, stimulating the inflow of international investments and local startups development. The idea of the document was proposed and formulated by the High-Tech Park, a core organization in Belarusian IT. The Decree was signed on 21 December 2017, and came in force on 28 March 2018. Decree No. 8 adopted the widespread institutions of UK law like convertible bonds and non-compete agreements, but also has preserved some features of continental law based on the principles of good faith and reasonableness, thus creating a favourable environment for starting and running a business.

As a result of the Decree introduction, Belarus became the first country in the world to legalize smart contracts and cryptocurrencies. As a result, the number of HTP resident companies increased by 600 by 2020, and Belarus' IT exports exceeded $3 bln as of the same year.

== History ==
=== Proposal ===
By early 2017, the Belarusian IT Belarusian IT community and, first of all, the High-Tech Park resident companies were concerned that the existed model of work created the conditions for the growth of custom software development and IT outsourcing, but did not help companies that create their software products thus preventing Belarusian IT from rapid growth. The lack of a system and a legal framework for venture financing also obstructed the development of Belarusian startups.

In January 2017, the President's assistant Vsevolod Yanchevsky, well-known for his liberal views, was appointed to lead the project of drafting a decree that would help create a more favourable environment for the development of the IT sector. On 13 March 2017, Alexander Lukashenko visited HTP residents and held a meeting with the managers, who voiced to the President the reasons why a legislative framework was essential to stimulate the growth of IT businesses and outlined their main ideas in this regard. A month later, on 21 April, in his annual address to the parliament and the Belarusian people, Lukashenko ordered to develop a new decree on the High-Tech Park, which would attract international companies engaged in the most promising areas—driverless transport, artificial intelligence, digital currencies.

To develop a new decree, the Administration of the High-Tech Park engaged representatives of the IT industry and expert community, held dozens of meetings with technology companies, as well as Belarusian and international legal and consulting firms, including Aleinikov & Partners, Vlasova, Mikhel & Partners, Baker Tilly Bel, and others. Denis Aleinikov, a Belarusian lawyer, is referred to as the main creator of the Decree, he and his company developed a legal framework for smart contracts and proposed to implement certain institutions of English law to boost venture capital financing in Belarus.

The draft was first published in several sources in July 2017. It sparked widespread discussion among specialists and market participants. After much debate, in September 2017, the draft was submitted to Alexander Lukashenko as a part of a package of liberal reforms of business legislation. The President suggested rethinking the title of the document, as its provisions affected not only the High-Tech Park, but also the Belarusian economy at large.

=== Discussion ===
The draft and the key points of the Decree were published in June 2017, welcomed by the members of the IT industry and harshly criticized by some economists. Critics opposed to the new decree argued that the draft's authors should have focused on the overall development of civil law reform so that the beneficial effect would influence all sectors of the economy; they criticized the orientation of Belarusian IT companies to foreign markets and argued that unmanned cars were irrelevant to Belarusian reality, that crypto-currencies could be risky economic bubbles, and that the technology of the blockchain is technically not legal, and is only applicable to the operation of cryptocurrencies. Meanwhile the supporters responded that the reform should start in a test box which would be used later for overall reform, so the authors of the Decree focused on the IT sphere they understood and the obstacles to its growth. They emphasized the significance of modern technologies for the country's future; they also noted that the expanded list of HTP work areas was drawn up taking into account the main contemporary trends, and the Decree creates the legal basis necessary for the development of breakthrough technologies.

=== Signing ===
By the beginning of December, a document called the "Decree on the Development of Digital Economy" had been approved by all authorized official bodies and again submitted to the President. The Decree was signed by the President on 21 December 2017, and came in force on 28 March 2018.

== Key points ==
The provisions of the Decree "On the Development of Digital Economy" established a legal basis for the circulation of digital currencies and tokens based on blockchain technology, so that resident companies of HTP can provide the services of stock markets and exchange offices with cryptocurrencies and attract financing through the ICO. For legal entities, the Decree confers the rights to create and place their own tokens, carry out transactions through stock markets and exchange operators; to individuals, the Decree gives the right to engage in mining, to own tokens, to acquire and change them for rubels, foreign currency and electronic money, and to bequeath them. According to the Decree, the residents were allowed to exclude revenue and profits from operations with tokens from the taxable base until 1 January 2023. The decree authorises individuals to buy and sell tokens without elevating this activity to the rank of entrepreneurial activity and exempting them from the need to declare tokens and income from transactions with them. The peculiarity of the introduced regulation is that all operations must be carried out through the resident companies of the High Technology Park. The Decree also sets legal basis for driverless car technology.

In addition, the decree includes:

- Extension of the validity period of the special legal regime of the High-Tech Park until 1 January 2049, and expansion of the list of activities of resident companies. Under the new rules, developers of blockchain-based solutions, developers of machine learning systems based on artificial neural networks, companies from the medical and biotechnological industries, developers of unmanned vehicles, andsoftware developers and publishers can become HTP residents. The list of promising areas is unlimited and can be expanded by the decision of HTP's Supervisory Board.
- Preservation of existing benefits for resident companies in the High-Tech Park, including the cancellation of the profit tax (instead of which a contribution of 1% of the gross revenues proceeding to the Administration of the Park is applied), reduced to 9% of the personal income tax rate for employees, and the right to contribute to the Social Protection Fund according to the national average figures, and not the actual salaries.
- Exemption of foreign companies providing marketing, advertising, consulting, and other services to the residents of the High-Tech Park from paying value-added tax, as well as paying income tax, which allows the promotion of IT products of Belarusian companies in foreign markets. To encourage investments, the Decree also exempts foreign companies from the tax on income from the alienation of shares, stakes in the authorized capital and shares in the property of residents of the High-Tech Park (subject to continuous ownership for at least 365 days).
- Introduction of individual English law institutions for residents of the High-Tech Park, which will make it possible to conclude option contracts, convertible loan agreements, non-competition agreements with employees, agreements with responsibility for enticing employees, irrevocable powers of attorney, and other documents common in international practice. This measure is aimed at simplifying the structuring of transactions with foreign capital.
- Simplification of the regime of currency transactions for residents of the High-Tech Park, including the introduction of a notification procedure for currency transactions, the cancellation of the mandatory written form of foreign trade transactions, the introduction of confirmation of the conducted operations by primary documents drawn up unilaterally. Also, the decree removes restrictions on resident companies for transactions with electronic money and allows opening accounts in foreign banks and credit and financial organizations without obtaining permission from the National Bank of the Republic of Belarus.
- Simplification of the procedure for attracting qualified foreign specialists by resident companies of the Hi-Tech Park, including cancellation of the attraction permit, simplification of the procedure for obtaining a work permit, and visa-free regime for founders and employees of resident companies with a period of continuous stay of up to 180 days.
- Abolition of subsidiary liability for HTP residents. This means that in case of bankruptcy of a company established by an HTP resident, its liabilities cannot be settled at the expense of the resident's "property owner, founders and other persons, including directors". This is one of the most important measures to attract foreign investors to the country and for major local players to invest in startups.

== Results and influence ==
Decree No. 8 was called revolutionary by Belarusian and foreign experts. According to Aleinikov, the introduction of the institution of English law, combined with a system of continental law based on the principles of good faith and reasonableness, has created a "superlaw", a unique legal hybrid of the best legal constructs, familiar and attractive to foreign venture capitalists. Decree No. 8 facilitated a major export breakthrough for the IT sector and made Belarus one of the IT leaders among the post-Soviet states. As an immediate result, in 2018 almost 200 companies joined HTP, two times more than in the entire history of the Park. IT exports in the first half of 2018 grew by more than 40% year-on-year. In 2019, HTP exports grew by another 50%. By the end of 2020, more than 600 companies had joined the Park. Of these, more than 200 worked on the domestic market in the interests of local enterprises, and, as noted by Vsevolod Yanchevsky, Director of the HTP Administration, the volume of this work almost tripled in 2018-20. Meanwhile, exports in the IT sector exceeded $3 bln. By legalizing cryptocurrencies, Belarus became one of the most progressive blockchain jurisdictions in the world, which attracted large foreign investments.

Media outlet Tut.by reported that due to one of the tax benefits provided by the decree, social benefits are charged to employers and paid to employees of IT-companies not based on their real salary (which is much higher than the national average), but are calculated and paid based on the size of the average salary in the country. This leads to low social payments to IT employees for sick leaves, consequently, IT employees prefer not to take sick leave. Some experts criticized the Decree for creation of the framework for the circulation of cryptocurrencies as a separate financial system, parallel to the national currency, and that with the use of cryptocurrencies could lead to an increase in fraud schemes.
