= Prisma Labs =

Company that owns apps that generate images using artificial intelligence

- Industry: Artificial intelligence
- Founded: 2016; 10 years ago
- Founders: Andrey Usoltsev; Alexey Moiseenkov
- Headquarters: Sunnyvale, California, US
- Key people: Andrey Usoltsev; Alexey Moiseenkov
- Products: Prisma, Lensa
- Website: prisma-ai.com

Prisma Labs is a software company based in Sunnyvale, California that is known for developing Prisma and Lensa.

== History ==
Prisma Labs was founded in 2016 by Andrey Usoltsev, Alexey Moiseenkov, and a team of Russian developers. Usoltsev is also the CEO. In 2016, the company launched the Prisma app, which uses artificial intelligence to duplicate photos in various artistic styles. In 2018, the company launched the Lensa AI app, which is a photo and video editing app. In late November 2022, Lensa's "magic avatars" feature was launched, which, for a fee, uses artificial intelligence and users' uploaded selfies to create portraits of the users in various styles and settings within minutes.

Lensa uses Stable Diffusion, an open source text-to-image model launched by Stability AI in August 2022. The company says it uses user photos to train its AI, and its user agreement states that Lensa can use the photos, videos, and other user content for "operating or improving Lensa" without compensation. The Lensa app has been criticized for producing hypersexualized images of women and girls, including non-consensual pornographic content, a bias not present when processing images of men.

== Datasets ==
Prisma Labs uses the Stable Diffusion generative engine to power the Lensa apps’s Magic Avatar feature. Stable Diffusion is open source and was trained on the LAION 5B dataset, which utilized 5.85 billion CLIP-filtered image-text pairs from Common Crawl to create the dataset.
