= IBA GROUP =

IT company

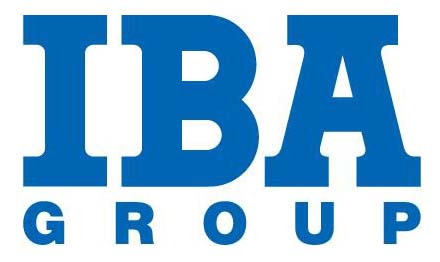
- Industry: IT
- Founded: 1993
- Headquarters: Prague
- Number of locations: 15 (2023)
- Revenue: 1,450,769,000 Czech koruna (2022)
- Operating income: 1,399,000 Czech koruna (2022)
- Net income: 6,092,000 Czech koruna (2022)
- Total assets: 2,511,410,000 Czech koruna (2022)
- Number of employees: 2,000

IBA GROUP is an international IT company founded in 1993. The company's focus areas include enterprise applications, mainframe systems, SAP solutions, cloud technologies, and RPA/ML/AI solutions.

Since 2005, the head office has been located in Prague, Czech Republic. The company has offices in 16 countries and development centers in ten countries.

== History ==
IBA GROUP was founded in 1993 as a joint venture between IBM and local IT organizations. Since 1998, the company started opening international offices, such as IBA USA in Mountain View, California. In 1999, the IBA CZ development center was launched in Prague, Czech Republic. In 1999, IBM withdrew as a part owner of IBA, while remaining its major business partner. In 2000, the IBA IT GmbH office opened in Düsseldorf, Germany.

In 2005, the head office of IBA Group was opened in Prague and at the same time IBA CZ office expanded to include a branch in Brno, Czech Republic. In 2010, an office was opened in Astana. In 2012, IBA Ukraine was opened in Kyiv, and in 2013, IBA South Africa was established in Johannesburg.

In 2014, IBA Group joined the International Association of Outsourcing Professionals (IAOP).

In 2015, IBA Group opened an office in Bratislava, Slovakia. In 2017, IBA CZ moved to a new office in Prague. In the same year, IBA Group opened a development center in Bulgaria.

In 2018, IBA Group joined the UN Global Compact network. In 2021, the company became a resident of Astana Hub Technopark and opened a development center in Wrocław, Poland - IBA Poland. In 2022, the company opened an office in Warsaw, Poland, and IBA ME, an office in the United Arab Emirates.

In 2022, the company began rebranding its Belarus-based parent. Representative offices and development centers were opened in Georgia, Croatia, Lithuania, and Serbia.

== Technology ==
IBA Group has a proprietary cloud platform and data centers to provide cloud services, and a robotic solution that automates development, deployment, running, and monitoring of software robots.

Based on its long-term cooperation with VISA Corp, IBA Group developed a series of mobile payment solutions.

=== tapXphone ===
TapXphone is a hardware-free digital payment acceptance solution that turns any NFC-enabled Android smartphone into a payment terminal. Using tapXphone, SMEs and individual entrepreneurs can accept contactless payments by Visa, MasterCard, American Express, China UnionPay, and other payment schemes. Developed by IBA Group, the solution is based on the VISA Tap to Phone technology. - TapXphone is PCI CPoC and PCI MPoC-compliant, and Visa and MasterCard-certified.

IBA Group implemented tapXphone in Ukraine, Kazakhstan, Moldova, Slovakia, Latvia, Lithuania, Estonia, Serbia, Bulgaria, Azerbaijan,Greece, Kosovo, Croatia, Albania, and Nigeria.
