= Flint Capital =

International venture capital firm

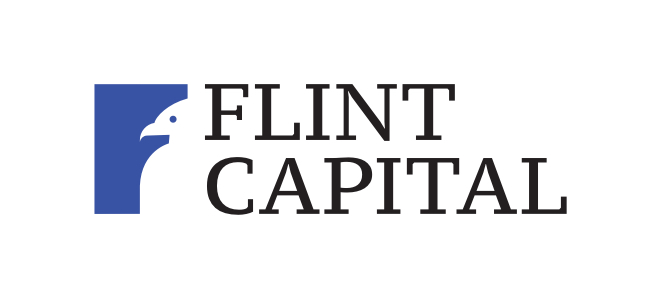
- Industry: venture capital
- Founded: 2013; 12 years ago
- Headquarters: Boston, United States
- Areas served: Europe, United States, Israel
- Key people: Dmitry Smirnov; Sergey Gribov; Andrew Gershfeld; (managing partners)
- Website: flintcap.com

Flint Capital is an American-Israeli venture capital firm focused on startups in health technology, cybersecurity, consumer technology, and SaaS. Founded in 2013, the firm is headquartered in Boston, United States. Flint Capital's managing partners are Dmitry Smirnov, Sergey Gribov, and Andrew Gershfeld.

== History ==
Flint Capital, whose name pays homage to Robert Louis Stevenson's Treasure Island novel, was established in 2013 by Dmitry Smirnov.

Flint Capital focuses on a wide array of technology sectors, including digital health, financial technology, cybersecurity, DevOps, SaaS, and more. It pays special attention to startups launched by immigrant entrepreneurs from Eastern Europe and Israel, and around a half of its funding goes towards Israeli companies.

By 2022, Flint Capital had two $100-million funds under management, over 45 portfolio companies, including three unicorns, and 13 successful exits. Its most successful investments included Socure (valued at $4.5 billion), Flo (valued at $800 million), and WalkMe (valued at $2.5 billion), each returning over $100 million on initial investments—more than the respective funds had raised.

== Management ==
Flint Capital's investment team includes Dmitry Smirnov, Sergey Gribov, and Andrew Gershfeld. The firm operates a head office in Boston, United States and an office in Tel Aviv, Israel, led by David Feldman.

== Funds ==
- Flint Capital I is a $107-million fund launched in 2013 to invest from $0.5 to $2 million on average in the early stage. The fund claims to have TVPI (total value to paid-in, the total value of the fund's holdings related to capital raised) among the top 10% venture funds globally.
- Flint Capital II is a $103-million fund raised by 2020. It's focused on seed and Series A and B rounds, with an average check size between $1 and $3 million. By the end of 2021, the second fund had made 18 investments, leading no less than 8, and had two successful exits.
- Flint Capital closed its third fund in 2024 at $160 million to be split between early and late stage investments.
