= Prisma (app) =

Photo-editing application

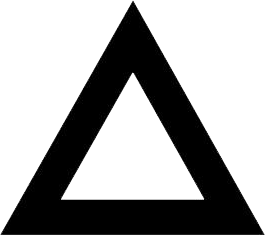

- An image of a cat rendered via the app.
- Original authors: Alexey Moiseenkov, Oleg Poyaganov, Ilya Frolov, Andrey Usoltsev
- Developers: Prisma Labs, Inc.
- Release: 11 June 2016; 10 years ago
- Operating system: iOS 8.0 or later; Android 4.1 or later;
- Type: Photo and video
- License: Freeware
- Website: prisma-ai.com

Prisma is a photo-editing mobile application that uses neural networks and artificial intelligence to apply artistic effects to transform images. Developed by Prisma Labs, the app was first released in 2016 for iOS and Android platforms.

Prisma became one of the most downloaded applications on the Apple App Store in multiple countries within its first few weeks. Its image-processing technology is based on neural style transfer, a machine learning technique that recreates images in the style of established artworks rather than applying simple visual filters.

== History ==
Prisma was developed by a team led by Alexey Moiseenkov (Russian: Алексей Моисеенков). Moiseenkov previously worked at Mail.Ru and later resigned from his job to dedicate his time to the development of the app. Moiseenkov also founded Prisma Labs, based in Sunnyvale, California. He later stated that development took approximately one and a half months and that the team did not initially do anything to promote the product.

The company's first investor was Alexey Gubarev, the owner of the data centre operator XBT Holding (Servers.com), who supported the project's growth by providing server infrastructure. In autumn 2016, Gubarev founded a new company, Haxus, and in early 2017 Haxus acquired Prisma's stake from XBT Holding.

The app was launched in June 2016 as a free mobile app. It became one of the most downloaded apps on the Apple App Store in Russia and neighboring countries. Within a week of its release, Prisma had been downloaded more than 7.5 million times and reached over 1 million active users by July 2016.

On July 19, 2016, Prisma Labs a beta version of the app for Android, which the developers closed a few hours later after receiving feedback from users. The Android version was officially released publicly on July 24, 2016 on Google Play.

In July 2016, the developer announced a video and virtual reality version of the app was under development.

On 7 July 2017, Prisma launched a new app called Sticky which turns selfies into stickers for sharing to social feeds.

In 2019, Mail.ru Group and Prisma Labs co-founder and former CEO Alexey Moiseenkov ceased to be shareholders in the developer of the Prisma photo-editing app. The company's largest shareholder became the investment firm Haxus, owned by Alexey Gubarev and Yuri Gurski. Haxus acquired the stakes held by Mail.ru Group and by Prisma co-founder and former CEO Alexey Moiseenkov.

== Features ==
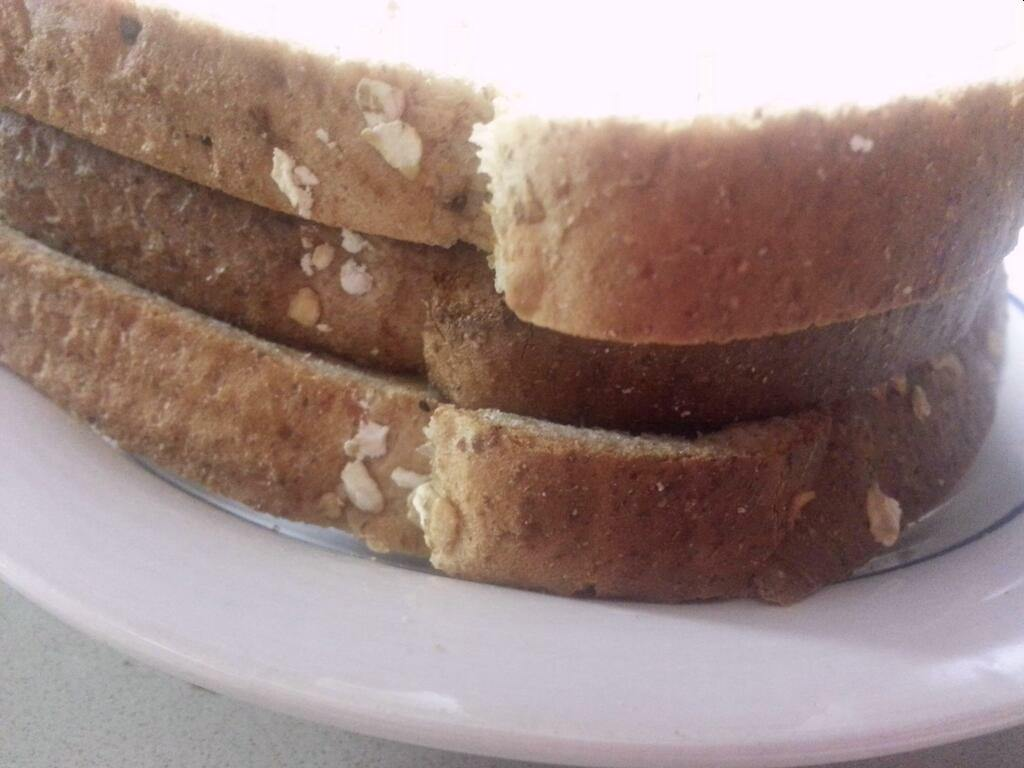
Original image

After being processed by Prisma

An image of a toast sandwich rendered via the Tokyo filter.

The algorithm that powers the app is based on the open source programming and algorithms behind DeepArt.

Users can upload pictures and select a variety of filters to transform the picture with an artistic effect. At launch, the app offered twenty different filters. Additional filters are added daily. In July 2016, Moiseenkov stated that the app will offer forty filters by the end of the month.

The image rendering takes place in Prisma Labs' servers and uses a neural network with artificial intelligence to add the artistic effect. The result is delivered back to the user's phone. Unlike other photo editing apps, Prisma renders the image by going through different layers and recreating the image rather than inserting a layer over the image.

In August 2016, the iOS version of the app was updated to edit image offline by utilizing the phone's processor for image rendering.

== Reception ==
=== Downloads ===
One week after its debut on iOS App Store, the app was downloaded over 7.5 million times and received over 1 million active users. It also became the top listed app in Russia and its neighboring countries. In the end of July 2016, it was installed over 12.5 million devices with over 1.5 million active users worldwide. According to App Annie, it was listed in the top 10 apps on the App Store in 77 different countries.

Image of Maynooth University captured through prisma

On the first day of the Android version release, it received over 1.7 million downloads with 50 million pictures processed by the app.

== Research and technology ==
The research paper behind the Prisma App technology is called "A Neural Algorithm of Artistic Style" by Leon Gatys, Alexander Ecker and Matthias Bethge and was presented at the premier machine learning conference: Neural Information Processing Systems (NIPS) in 2015. The technology is an example of a Neural Style Transfer algorithm. This technology used in Prisma was developed independently and before Prisma, and both the university and the company have no affiliation with one another.

The code for the previous papers is available at no charge at GitHub for research purposes.

== See also ==
- DeepArt
- List of Prisma (app) filters
