= Belarusian partisan movement (2020–present) =

Ongoing partisan movement in Belarus

- Part of Belarusian democratic movement, Russo-Ukrainian War and Post-Soviet conflicts
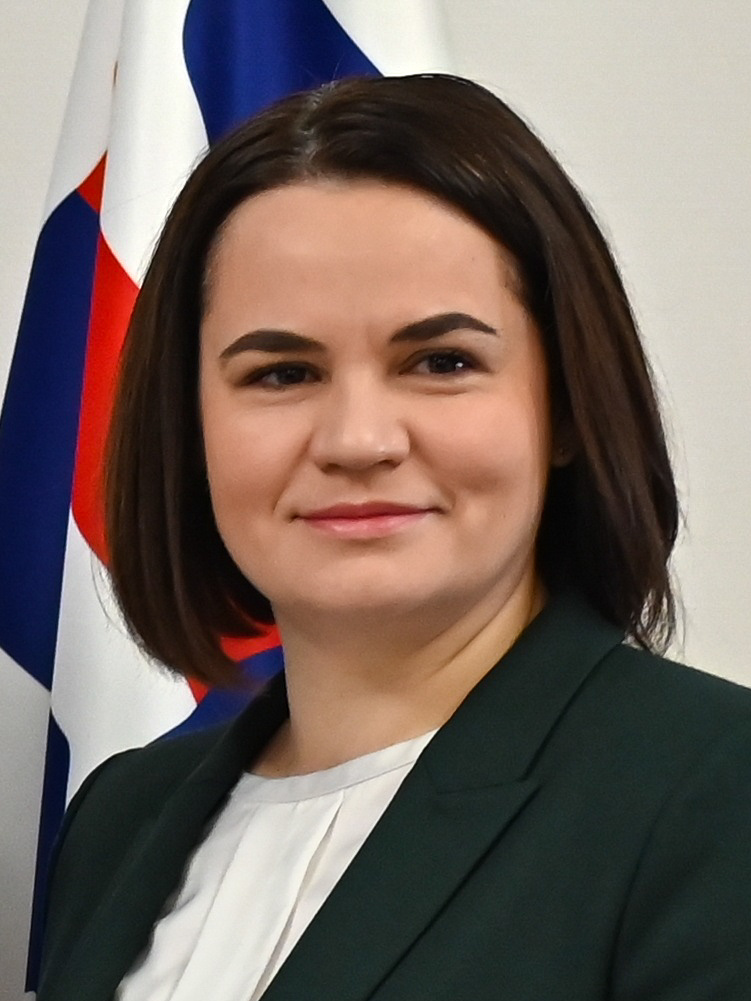
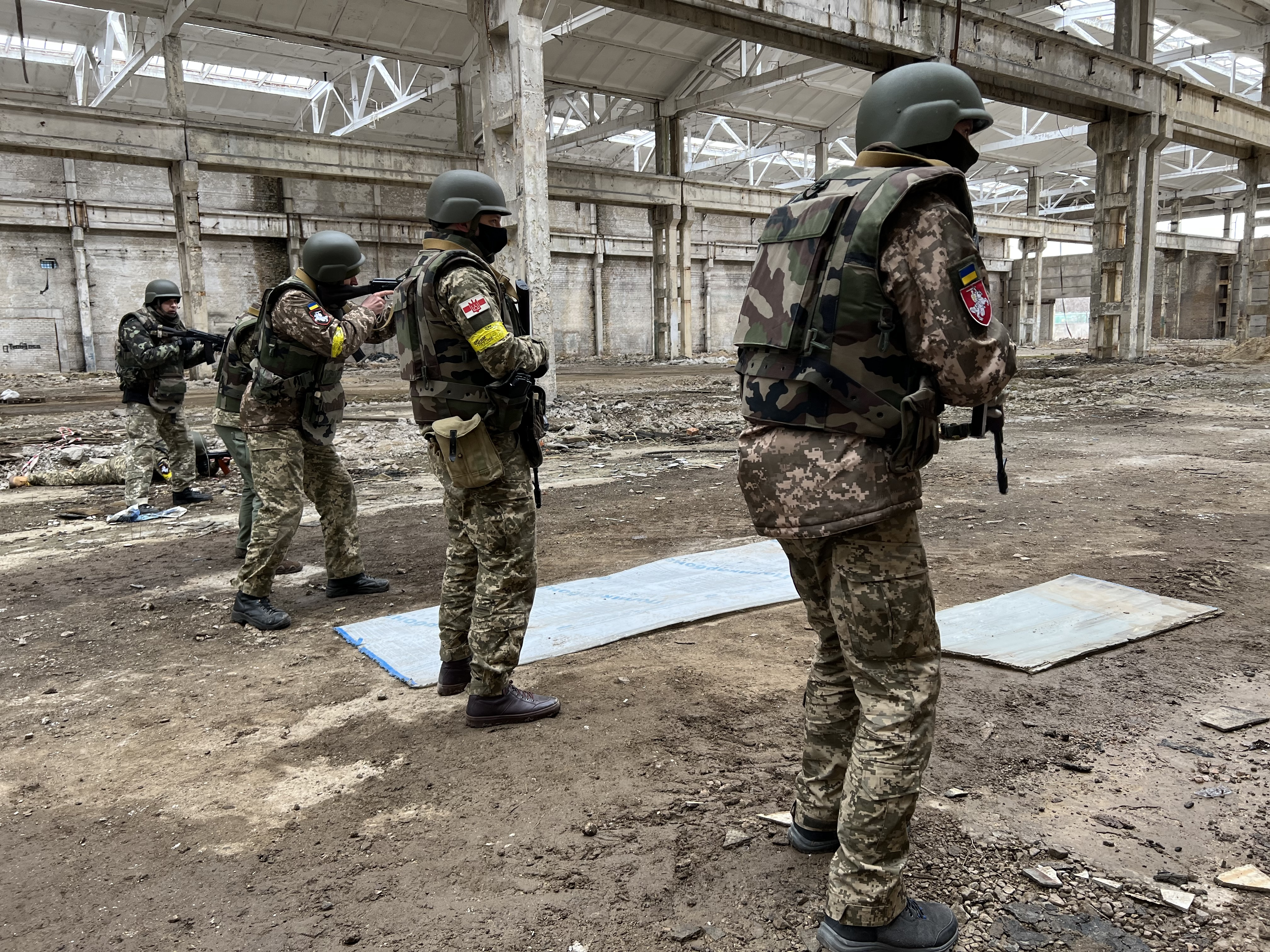
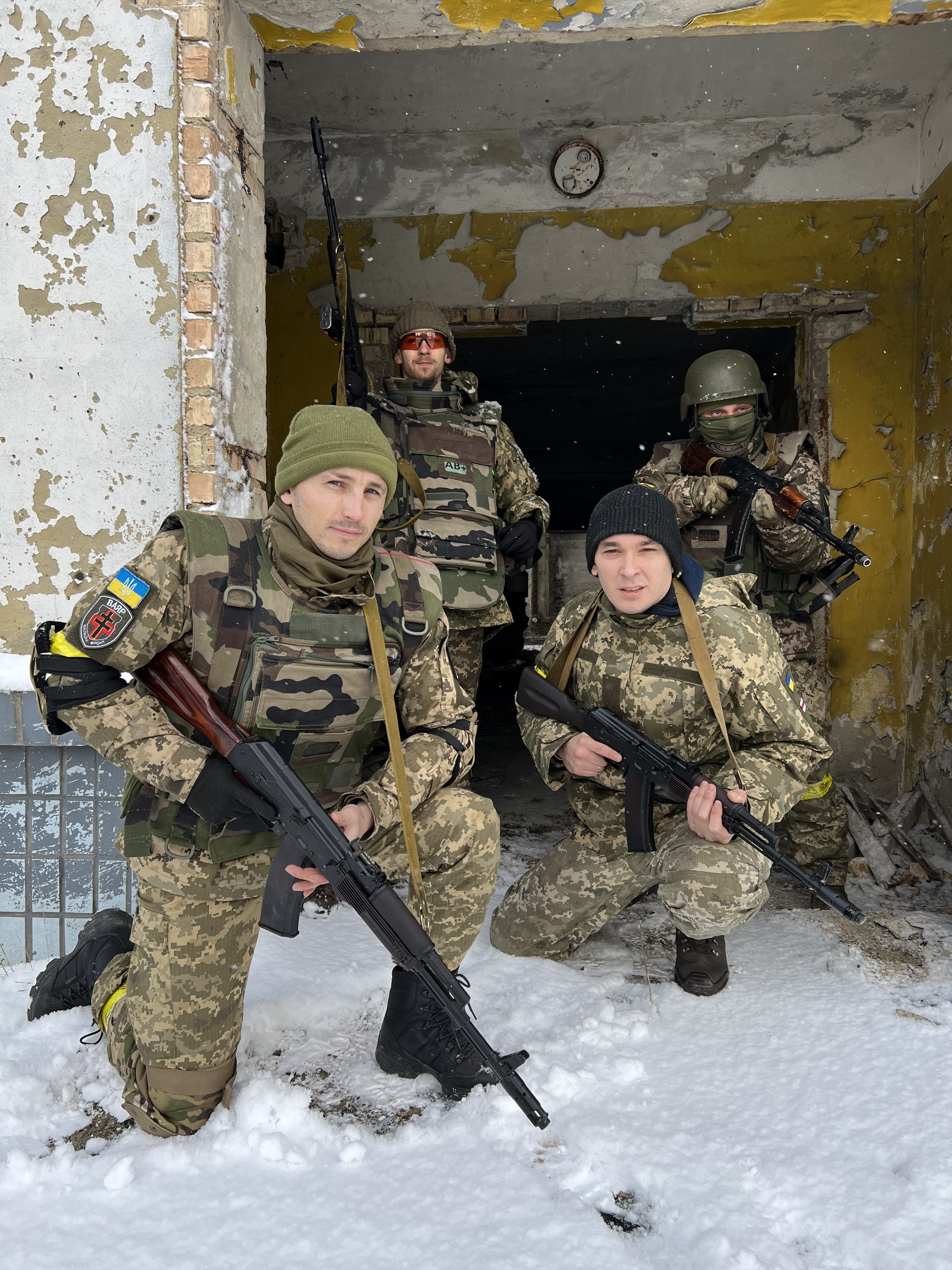
- Top left: Belarusian opposition leader Sviatlana Tsikhanouskaya, Top right: authoritarian Belarusian President Alexander Lukashenko, Bottom left: Kastuś Kalinoŭski Regiment training in Ukraine in 2022, Bottom right: Belarusian volunteers fighting against Russians in Ukraine
- Date: 9 August 2020 – present (6 years, 3 months, 1 week and 1 day)
- Location: Belarus, Russia, Ukraine, Poland, Lithuania, Latvia
- Caused by: 2020–2021 Belarusian protests, Russian invasion of Ukraine
- Goals: Removal of Alexander Lukashenko; Return of Sviatlana Tsikhanouskaya to lead provisional government; Democratization and regime change; Removal of the Russian troops stationed on the Belarusian soil; Removal of nuclear weapons in Belarus; Restoration of 1994 constitution; Restoration of the national symbols of Belarus; Derussification of Belarus; Freeing political prisoners
- Methods: Sabotage; Amateur drone attacks; Cyberattacks; Public protests; Military training abroad
- Status: Ongoing low intensity conflict as of 2026

Parties
Belarusian opposition; Coordination Council; United Transitional Cabinet; Belarusian partisans: Supraciŭ; Cyber Partisans; People's Self-Defense Brigades "DNS"; Busly liaciać; BYPOL; "Paspalitaje rušeńnie"; Community of Railway Workers of Belarus; Kastuś Kalinoŭski Regiment (in Ukraine); Independent dissidents (incl. within Belarusian security forces)	Government of Belarus; Ministry of Defence; Armed Forces; KGB; Alpha Group; Ministry of Internal Affairs; Militsiya; Almaz; OMON; Internal Troops; GUBOPiK; Presidential Security Service

Lead figures
Sviatlana Tsikhanouskaya; Sergei Tikhanovsky (Note: Imprisoned in Belarus from 2020 to 2025); Pavel Latushko; Aliaksandr Azarau; (Ukraine) Siarhiey Biaspalau; (Ukraine) Dzianis Procharaŭ	Government of Belarus: Alexander Lukashenko; (Belarus) Roman Golovchenko (until 2025); (Belarus) Alexander Turchin (since 2025); Viktor Gulevich (until 2024); Pavel Muraveiko (since 2024)

Casualties
- Deaths: Unknown, at least 1
- Injuries: Several
- Arrested: At least 60

The Belarusian partisan movement, sometimes called the pro-democratic insurgency in Belarus, is an ongoing campaign of resistance against the authoritarian Alexander Lukashenko. It began in response to the violent suppression of the 2020–2021 Belarusian protests. The partisans aim to depose Lukashenko's government and expel Russian troops from Belarus.

== History ==
=== 2020 ===
Lukashenko was declared the winner of the 2020 presidential election on 9 August 2020, intensifying the ongoing protests against his administration. In response the Coordination Council led by Sviatlana Tsikhanouskaya was formed on 14 August.

Several key opposition groups aligned with the Coordination Council were formed in the autumn of 2020, such as the Cyber Partisans, Busly liaciać, and BYPOL.

=== 2021 ===
In January, a Belarusian was arrested after an arson attack against a T-72 tank at Ściapianka railway station in Minsk. The Cyber Partisans conducted a campaign of cyberattacks on the government's internet infrastructure in mid-2021, including the release of personal information of thousands of government officials, police, military, and pro-Lukashenko propagandists. On September 25, a partisan cell under Busły liaciać attacked an OMON base in Uručča with an incendiary mixture dropped from a drone, and in December, another cell attacked a training base of the Ministry of Internal Affairs in Valoŭščyna. Throughout the year, partisans participated in blocking railways, destroying CCTV, damaging infrastructure used by the government, and actions against government officials.

=== 2022 ===
Partisan activity increased in the buildup to the 2022 Russian invasion of Ukraine. In mid-January, the Cyber Partisans launched a cyberattack on infrastructure of Belarusian Railways, severely delaying the movement of Russian transport in Belarus; they stated they would decrypt the systems upon the release of 50 prisoners and Russian troops being removed from Belarus. During the Battle of Kyiv, BYPOL and Belarusian partisans published information on how to disable railway signalling boxes, which severely disrupted the Russian logistic network. In March near Babrujsk, government security services fired on partisans who set fire railway signals; and by late April there were at least 11 partisans detained.

The rail war in Belarus began in February 2022. Signaling equipment was destroyed in three Belarusian regions, and railway lines were blocked. As a result of these operations, the work of several branches of the Belarusian railway was disrupted.

After the formation of the Kastuś Kalinoŭski Regiment, and their assurances that they will liberate Belarus, representatives of BYPOL stated that they would welcome a national liberation of Belarus if circumstances allow it.

=== 2023 ===
On the 26th of February, 2023, an AWACS Beriev A-50U spy aircraft of the Russian Air Force at Mačuliščy air base was reportedly damaged as two explosions were heard. BYPOL claimed that Belarusian partisans were responsible for the disabling of the aircraft, saying via telegram that the explosions were a result of a drone attack by members of the group. Exiled Belarusian dissident Sviatlana Tsikhanouskaya responded to news of the attack stating, "I am proud of all Belarusians who continue to resist the Russian hybrid occupation of Belarus & fight for the freedom of Ukraine."

Same year an organization known as Paspalitaje Rušeńnie (People's Self-Defence) has been created in exile by a Belarusian veteran Sieržuk Kiedyška with goal of, once the occasion arises, liberating the Belarusian territory through military means. It cooperates with the Kastuś Kalinoŭski Regiment, United Transitional Cabinet as well as "Litvins' Club". There are several People's Self-Defence departments in Polish and Lithuanian cities where Belarusian exiles' diasporas exist. Recruited volunteers undergo military training there and swear on oath of loyalty to free Belarus with the traditional national emblems present.

=== 2024 ===
On 16 February 2024, a group of alleged Belarusian and Ukrainian saboteurs in possession of explosives were detained after crossing into Belarus from Ukraine. In a speech responding to the incident, Lukashenko said that the country was regularly stopping attempted incursions by these kinds of armed groups, around "two or three times a week".

On 28 February, BYPOL told Belgian media that a coup against Lukashenko was being actively planned and would be executed "at the right time". The group said it was training officers in Polish military camps and that 200,000 volunteers had registered to participate in simultaneous resistance actions during the coup (such as marches, blockades, and the installment of barricades in strategic areas). Of these, 5,000 volunteers were preparing to carry out "special operations" such as sabotage.

=== 2025 ===
On March 25 2025, the Cyber Partisans reported another breach of state systems, this time targeting the national CERT infrastructure under Lukashenko’s Operational and Analytical Center.

== Exiles ==
It is believed that between 200,000 and 500,000 Belarusians left Belarus around and after the time of the 2020 election and are living in exile in many countries.

Many are described as politically displaced persons by the Parliamentary Assembly of the Council of Europe, which is looking at issues of them possibly becoming stateless and issues of visas and residence permits.

== Reactions ==
The Belarusian government responded harshly to violent incidents. Belarusian courts have charged Partisans with terrorism, a charge which carries the death penalty in Belarus.

In September 2023 a Belarusian law forbade the renewal of official documents at embassies outside of Belarus, aiming to penalise exiled Belarusian citizens by leaving them without valid ID documents. Belarusians in exile are at risk of statelessness, as the New Belarus passport project is still in development.

== See also ==
- Elections in Belarus
- 2020 Belarusian presidential election
- Russian partisan movement (2022–present)
