= Tatsiana Zaretskaya =

Belarusian software executive and entrepreneur

- Occupation: Businessperson
- Website: tatsianazaretskaya.com

Tatsiana Zaretskaya (Belarusian: Таццяна Зарэцкая; born 1994) is a Belarusian entrepreneur and the co-founder of the software firm Laava Tech. Zaretskaya was nominated to the Belarusian United Transitional Cabinet in September 2022, with responsibility for Finance and Economy. On 2 November 2022, she announced that she had resigned from the Cabinet as a result of weeks of threats to her family, friends, and employees. Following her resignation, independent media published investigations raising significant doubts about the viability and legitimacy of her business.

In 2024, the European Public Prosecutor's Office (EPPO) launched a criminal fraud investigation into Zaretskaya and Laava Tech, demanding the return of over €2 million in European Union subsidies.

== Childhood and studies ==
Tatsiana Zaretskaya was born in 1994 in Minsk, Belarus, to a family of chemists. She initially studied international relations at the Belarusian State University before transferring to an educational program in Estonia. She also has training as a lawyer.

== Laava Tech ==
At the age of 23, Zaretskaya co-founded Laava Tech, a software firm based in Tallinn that claimed to develop software and hardware for minimizing energy use in LEDs for indoor farming. Zaretskaya described Laava Tech's system as providing a fully automated system for controlling lighting, air flows, and irrigation, using Internet of things sensors for monitoring. She claimed the technology could reduce electricity consumption by 75% while simultaneously improving crop yields by 20%. Based on these pitches, Laava Tech secured a European Union grant of around €2.4 million.

== United Transitional Cabinet ==
On 9 September 2022, Zaretskaya was announced as the member of the Belarusian United Transitional Cabinet responsible for Finance and Economy. Prior to her appointment, she passed a polygraph test administered by the BYPOL initiative and a security check by the Estonian Ministry of Foreign Affairs.

Two months later, on 2 November 2022, Zaretskaya announced her resignation from the Cabinet, citing severe pressure and threats to people around her. She stated that there had been "a barrage of anonymous messages, letters, calls, direct threats" to her friends, relatives, employees, partners, and investors.

Following the resignation, Zerkalo and Nasha Niva attempted to interview Zaretskaya about the threats, as well as the technology, revenue, and overall success of Laava Tech. Zaretskaya answered questions regarding the threats but avoided providing any detailed answers concerning her business, and reportedly threatened journalists with lawsuits for investigating her company.

Democratic leader Sviatlana Tsikhanouskaya later admitted that the Cabinet made a mistake by failing to conduct a thorough background check and proper due diligence on Zaretskaya's business claims before appointing her.

== Scrutiny and fraud investigation ==
In November 2022, an independent investigation by Nasha Niva highlighted numerous "red flags" regarding Zaretskaya's background and business. Financial analysts pointed out that her startup lacked scientific proof for its technological claims, had no verifiable prototypes or visible commercial clients, and showed significant discrepancies between publicly claimed revenues and official financial reports. It was also revealed that Zaretskaya had participated in a fraudulent investor conference in Monaco organized by a known scammer. Furthermore, it was alleged that Laava Tech manipulated its EU grant conditions by creating a temporary shell company in Poland, obtaining a small Polish government grant, and transferring it to the Estonian parent company to falsely simulate "commercialization" required to unlock the next EU funding tranche.

By mid-2024, open-source registries showed that Laava Tech had effectively ceased operations, failing to submit required financial statements in Estonia and shrinking to just one employee, having failed to sustain itself after the EU grant tranches ended.

In 2025, Zaretskaya officially relocated to the United Arab Emirates, becoming a tax resident there. She subsequently rebranded herself as a networking intermediary, offering European startups paid introductions to supposedly high-level Saudi Arabian investors and royal family members for fees ranging from $45,000 to $110,000.

In February 2026, it was publicly disclosed that the European Public Prosecutor's Office (EPPO) had opened a criminal investigation into Zaretskaya and two other suspects regarding the activities of Laava Tech. The EPPO suspects that the project was fraudulent and caused nearly €450,000 in direct damages to the EU. Additionally, Brussels demanded the return of over €2 million from the previously issued subsidy. Following the investigation, an Estonian court seized Zaretskaya's bank accounts and placed a ban on the disposal of her assets in Estonia up to the amount of €1.8 million.

== Recognition ==
Zaretskaya was included in a Forbes 30 Under 30 list in 2020 and in an Innovators Under 35 list in 2022.
