= Aliaksandr Azarau =

Belarusian police investigator

- Аляксандр Азараў
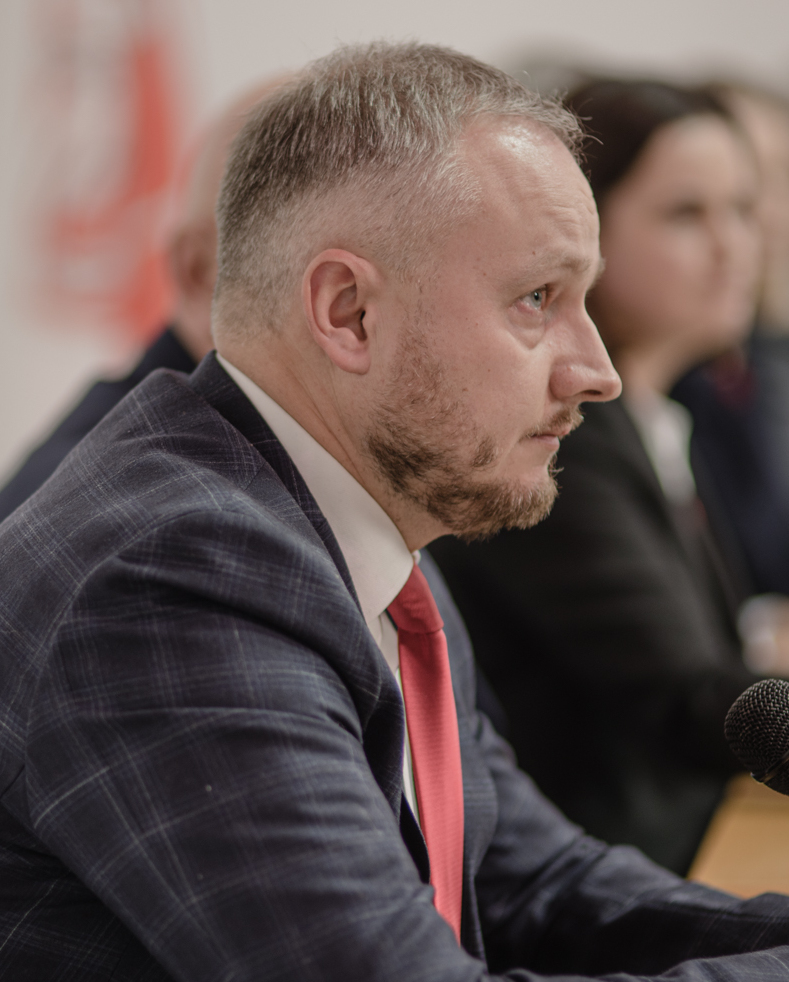
- Aliaksandr Azarau at a conference in Warsaw in 2022.

Representative of the United Transitional Cabinet for Law and Order
- In office 9 August 2022 – 6 August 2023
- President: Sviatlana Tsikhanouskaya
- Preceded by: Valery Kavaleuski

Public Representative of BYPOL
- Incumbent
- Assumed office May 2021 Serving with Stanislau Luponosau

Personal details
- Born: 4 February 1977 (age 49) Minsk, Byelorussian SSR, Soviet Union
- Education: Minsk State Linguistic University; Belarus State Economic University; Belarus Institute of Law
- Police Career
- Department: Investigative Committee of Belarus; GUBOPiK
- Service years: 2000–2020
- Rank: Lieutenant Colonel of Police

Aliaksandr Aliaksandravich Azarau (Belarusian: Аляксандр Аляксандравіч Азараў, Russian: Александр Александрович Азаров) is a former police investigator in Belarusian security services including the Investigative Committee of Belarus and GUBOPiK. As of 2022, he is head of the Belarusian opposition police group BYPOL. Azarau was responsible for law and order as a member of the United Transitional Cabinet of the Belarusian opposition from August 2022 to 6 August 2023.

== Childhood and early education ==
Azarau was born in Minsk in 1976 or 1977 (age 49–50). He was brought up in Frunzyenski District in Minsk. His father, a construction worker, died from electrocution when Azarau was 11 and his mother was an engineer. Azarau expected to become a banker.

Azarau graduated in law at Belarus Institute of Law in 2000.

== Police officer ==
After obtaining his law degree, Azarau started work in the police as an investigator at the Investigative Committee of Belarus. He obtained degrees from Belarus State Economic University and Minsk State Linguistic University while working as an investigator.

Azarau worked at GUBOPiK, a Belarusian security service, from 2008 to around 2018, as a specialist in investigating human trafficking. Azarau claims that from 2015, he "openly defended Ukrainians" within his service, leading to internal conflict. He reached the status of lieutenant-colonel as head of a GUBOPiK unit.

Following his time at GUBOPiK, Azarau was shifted to the Academy of the Minister of the Interior, becoming a lecturer.

== BYPOL and United Transitional Cabinet ==
Azarau resigned from official police duties and joined BYPOL (Association of Security Forces of Belarus), an organisation of Belarusian former security officers who oppose the Alexander Lukashenko presidency of Belarus. Azarau was the head of BYPOL Foundation when it was created in May 2021.

As head of BYPOL, Azarau judged BYPOL's role in the 2022 rail war in Belarus as having helped to reverse the 2022 Russian military offensive that aimed to conquer Kyiv, the capital of Ukraine.

In August 2022, Azarau was appointed to the United Transitional Cabinet, with responsibility for law and order.

In August 2023, the Belarusian Coordination Council exercised the principle of separation of powers by withdrawing confidence in Azarau as Representative for Law and Order. Tsikhanouskaya implemented the Council's decision by dismissing Azarau from the Cabinet. Sviatlana Tsikhanouskaya, announced the dismissal on 6 August 2023. Azarau retained a role of work with the Cabinet in implementing the "Victory" plan.

== Relation to Lukashenko government ==
Azarau sees himself as having never "supported Lukashenko" and aimed to serve the interests of Belarusians. He stated that he personally saw fraud in the 2020 Belarusian presidential election and illegal orders of repression in the protests that followed the election.

In May 2021, Azarau estimated that many members of the official Belarusian security forces did not wish to support activities of repression, but worried about being unemployable if they resigned. He predicted that at a "critical moment", only a small number of security forces would defend Lukashenko, and employees who "doubt [and] silently go to work" would support the anti-Lukashenko opposition.

== Criticisms ==
Belarusian politician and activist Andrei Sannikov stated that because of Azarau's past role in GUBOPiK, Sannikov didn't see how Azarau could be trusted.

On 16 June 2023, Natallia Radzina (Russian: Наталья Радина) alleged in NV.ua that there were suspicions of Azarau working for Belarusian secret services. Radzina stated that after hundreds or thousands of Belarusians registered for the "Peramoga" plan of preparing resistance to the Lukashenko government, many were arrested. She stated that GUBOPiK, Azarau's former employer, had frequently broadcast videos of people who stated that they had been arrested for participation in Peramoga. In July 2023, the group Joint Resistance Staff accused Azarau of working for the Belarusian intelligence directorate (GRU).

== Personal life ==
As of 2022, Azarau lives in Warsaw with his wife and two daughters who attend school there.

=== Harassment ===
Belarusian authorities seized Azarau's Belarusian bank accounts in 2021. Security forces searched Azarau's mother's home, confiscated her electronic devices, and visited people who had telephoned her. Azarau interpreted the events as harassment, that effectively frightened friends and family from contacting his mother.

Azarau believes that Belarusian spies were sent to Poland to spy on Azarau and "eliminate" BYPOL leadership.

On 15 February 2024, Azarau was sentenced to 25 years in prison in absentia. Five other BYPOL founders received lengthy prison terms on the same day. Later that year, he was sentenced again, for the Machulishchy air base attack.
