= Alina Koushyk =

Belarusian journalist

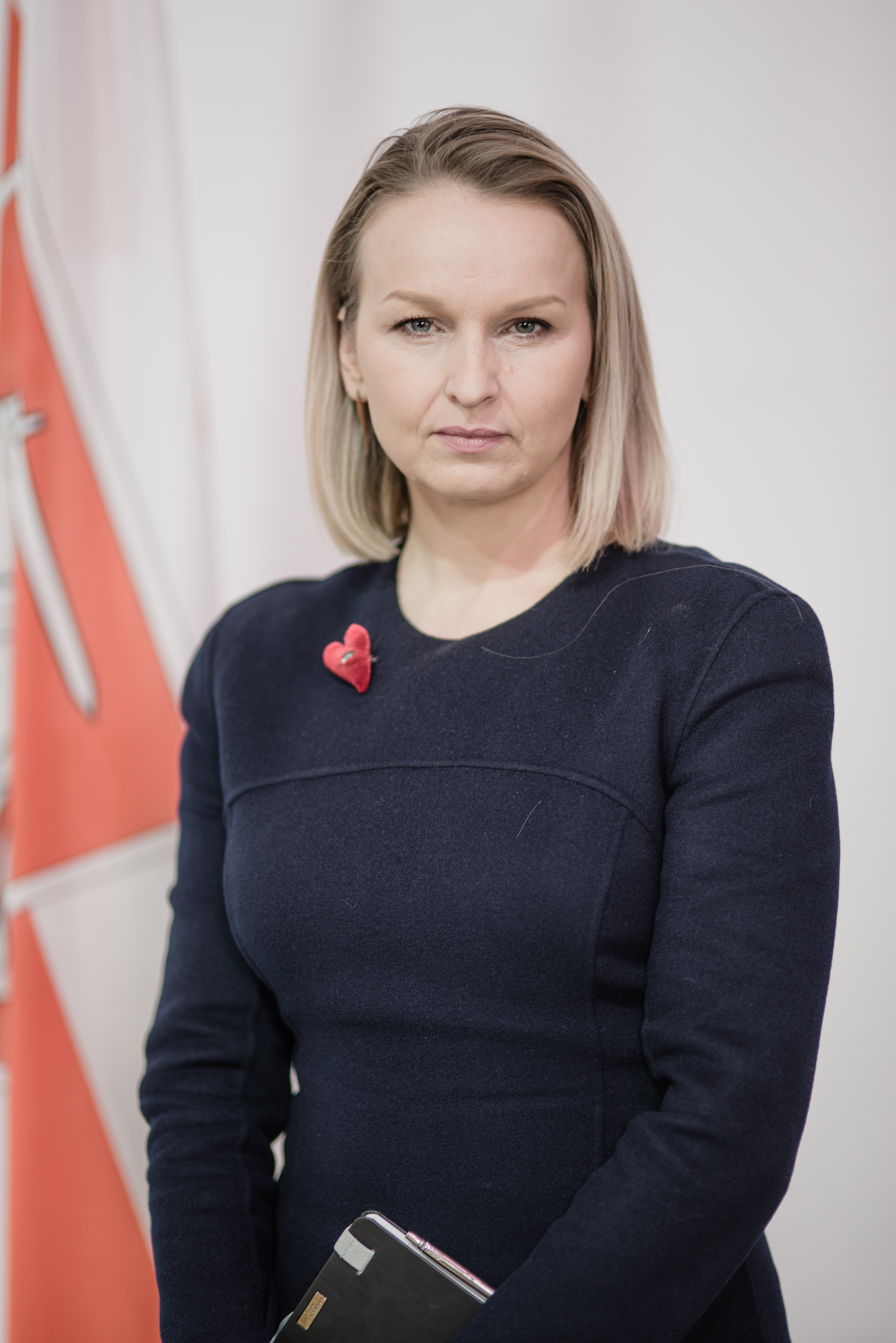
- Alina Koushyk (2022)
- Born: Grodno
- Education: University of Warsaw
- Occupations: Journalist, television presenter
- Employer: Belsat TV (2007–)
- Website: 1000i1koushyk.blogspot.com

Alina Kouszyk is a Belarusian journalist and TV host for Belsat TV. She was a member of the Belarusian United Transitional Cabinet with responsibility for National Revival from 16 September 2022 to early 2025.

== Childhood and education ==
Kouszyk studied history and teaching English at Yanka Kupala State University of Grodno and politics at the University of Warsaw.

== Television ==
Kouszyk started work for Belsat TV around 2007, as a host of TV shows including Belsat Studio, PraSvet and 54% and as a journalist.

== Cultural organising ==
Kouszyk organised Belarusian cultural activities in Warsaw, including the co-founding of the Centre for Belarusian Solidarity and InBelKult 2.0.

== United Transitional Cabinet ==
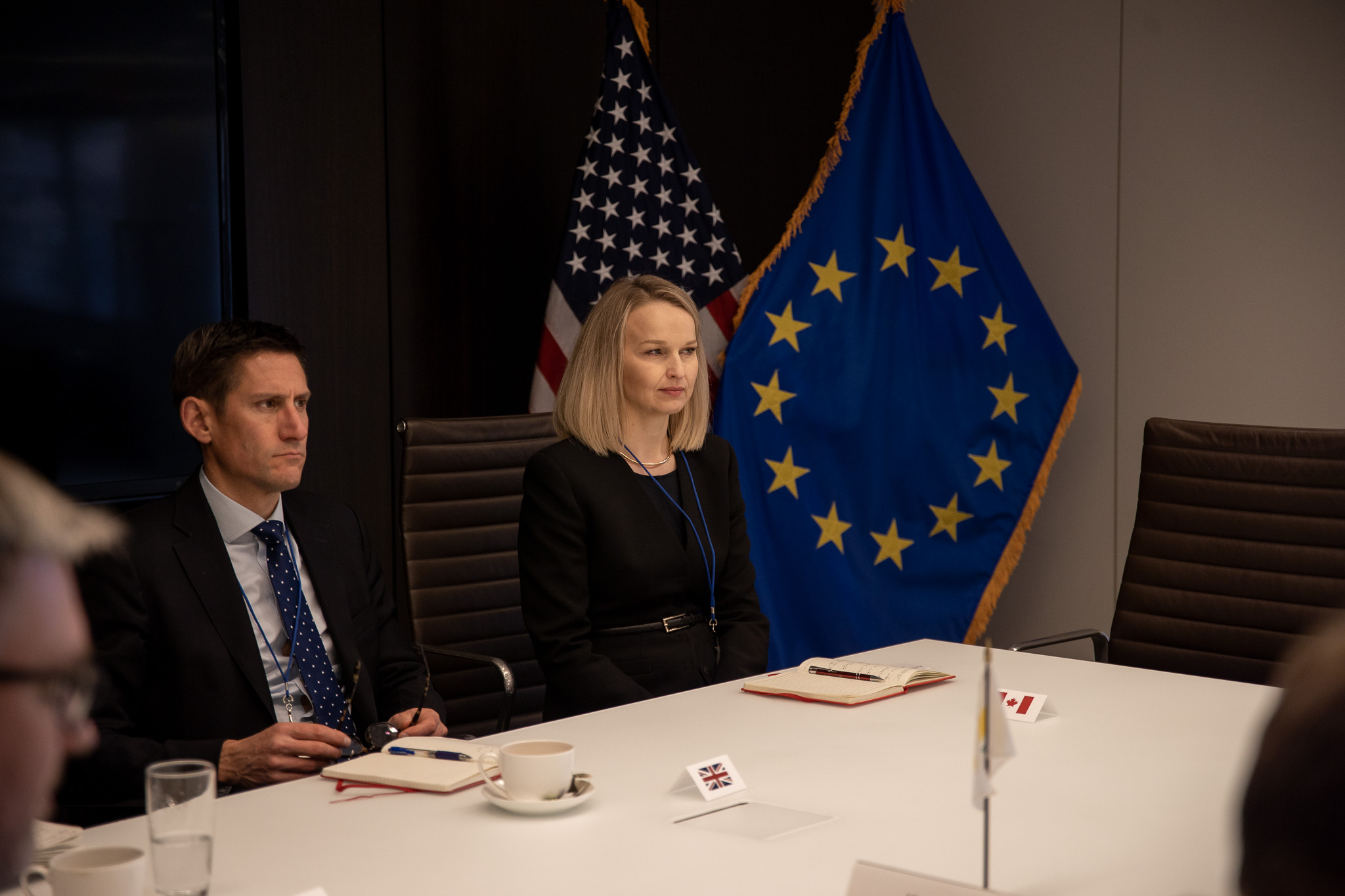
During a working visit to the US on 27 March 2023

On 16 September 2022, Kouszyk was nominated to the Belarusian United Transitional Cabinet with responsibility for National Revival, to develop Belarusian culture and education. Koushyk finished her term around early 2025, and was replaced by Pavel Barkouski.
