= Machulishchy air base attack =

2023 opposition attack in Belarus

Coordinates: 53.780°N 27.578°E

- Part of the Belarusian partisan movement (2020–present) the Russian invasion of Ukraine and the Opposition to Russian invasion of Ukraine
- Aircraft A-50U (RF-50608) in the year 2011
Date	February 26, 2023
Location	Belarus, Minsk region, Machulishchi airport
Result	BYPOL victory

Belligerents
Belarusian opposition	Russia
BYPOL	Russian Aerospace Forces

Commanders and leaders
(Belarus) Aliaksandr Azarau	Vladimir Putin

Casualties and losses
None	1 Beriev A-50 damaged

The Machulishchy air base attack occurred on February 26, 2023, at the Machulishchy military airfield, around 12 km (7.5 mi) from Minsk, a Russian A-50 early warning military aircraft was damaged as a result of explosions. BYPOL claimed responsibility for the drone attack. Belarusian president Alexander Lukashenko acknowledged the attack only a week later, stating that the damage to the aircraft was minor. Later, he admitted that the A-50 still had to be sent to Russia for repairs.

== Russian A-50 in Belarus ==
Alexander Lukashenko, being an ally of Russian president Vladimir Putin, allowed Russia to use the territory of Belarus as a launching pad for the invasion of Ukraine in February 2022. After the beginning of the invasion, the resistance members from Belarus, who called themselves "partisans", began to carry out sabotage on the railways used by Russian troops. At the time of the incident in Machulishchy, Belarusian partisans claimed involvement in 17 major railway sabotages.

According to the publication Military Balance, for 2022 the Russian Air Force had three A-50's and six A-50U's. The cost of such an aircraft is estimated at $330 million. According to the monitoring group "Belarus Gayan" A-50U aircraft with registration number RF-50608 flew to Belarus on January 3, 2023, and by the time of the incident made 12 flights. According to the Belarusian authorities, this long-range radar detection and control aircraft was used by them to monitor their border. According to the Belarusian partisans, who was stationed in their station. In this regard, the Ukrainska Pravda noted that aircraft carrying Kinzhal hypersonic missiles usually took off from the Machulishchi airfield, which is why an air force was declared in Ukraine.

== The course of the attack ==
On the morning of February 26, 2023, at the Belarusian military airfield "Machulishchi", located 12 km from Minsk, there were explosions. After that, activists from BYPOL reported that as a result of at least two explosions, a Russian military transport aircraft and snowplows were damaged. It was reported that in the area of the airfield, local residents observed a large number of military and traffic police crews, They checked all passing cars. Later, BYPOL reported that sabotage was committed at the military airfield, as a result of which the Russian military long-range radar detection aircraft A-50 was seriously damaged - its front and central parts, as well as avionics and radar, were damaged.

The incident was initially denied by both the Belarusian and Russian sides. However, a month later, Alexander Lukashenko acknowledged the attack, saying that the damage to the plane was minor. Later, he nevertheless admitted that the A-50 had to be sent to Russia for repairs.

== Organizers ==
Responsibility for the drone attack was claimed by the Association of Security Forces of Belarus (BYPOL), the core of which is made up of former military men who disagree with the policy of the country's authorities. BYPOL works closely with the team of the leader of the Belarusian opposition in exile, Sviatlana Tsikhanouskaya. BYPOL leader Aliaksandr Azarau said in an interview with Belsat, that all the people who carried out the attack were able to leave Belarus safely and confirmed that it was carried out by drones.

Alexander Lukashenko announced the arrest of the perpetrator of the attack, a dual citizen of Ukraine and Russia, along with more than 20 accomplices and accused them of having links with the Ukrainian special services. BYPOL and the Ukrainian authorities rejected accusations of Kyiv's involvement. BYPOL leader Aliaksandr Azarau said that the person named by Lukashenka as the executor is not familiar to him.

== Reaction and aftermath ==
BYPOL leader Aliaksandr Azarau said that the group is preparing other operations to liberate Belarus "from Russian occupation" and liberate Belarus from the Lukashenka regime, noting that they now have a "two-headed enemy".

Ukrainian authorities have rejected accusations of involvement in the incident.

The ONT TV channel, citing the deputy head of the Investigative Directorate of the KGB of Belarus, Konstantin Bychek, reported that in the case of the incident with the plane at the military airfield in Machulishchy - about 30 defendants, they may face death. It is known about the detention of IT specialist Dmitry Mostovoy. All the detainees were charged under the article on the terrorist attack.

The Human Rights Center "Viasna" reported that the former deputy minister of communications of Belarus and assistant to the chairman of the board of the Eurasian Economic Commission (EEC) was detained in Russia, Dmitry Shedko, who could be associated with people involved in sabotage in Machulishchy.

According to the calculations of military expert Ilya Kramnik, quoted by Radio Liberty, at the end of November 2022, Russian A-50 reconnaissance aircraft spent about 40 hours in the air in the war zone in Ukraine, this means that most of the time the Russian army already received insufficient information from them, while the Ukrainian army was supplied with intelligence information by NATO countries.

In November 2023, it became known that Belarusian IT specialist Dmitry Mostovoy was sentenced to 10 years in prison, having been accused of organizing an online broadcast from the Machulishchy air base shortly before the attack.

In June 2024, Nikolai Shvets, a Ukrainian national, detained by Belarusian security forces for the attack in Machulishchy, was released as part of an exchange between Russia and Ukraine.

On 4 October 2024, a court convicted 12 people, seven of them in absentia (including Azarau and Shvets), over their role in the attack and sentenced them to up to 25 years' imprisonment. Four of the defendants were convicted for terrorism.
