= Vladzimir Astapenka =

Belarusian diplomat

- Уладзімір Астапенка
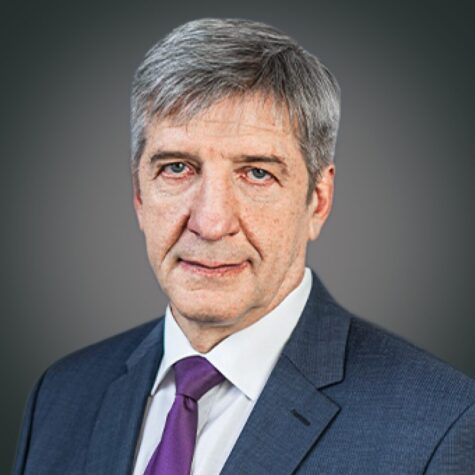

Deputy Representative of the United Transitional Cabinet for Foreign Affairs
- In office 1 September 2022 – 4 August 2024 Serving with Valery Kavaleuski
- President: Sviatlana Tsikhanouskaya
- Preceded by: Office established

Representative of the United Transitional Cabinet for Foreign Affairs
- Incumbent
- Assumed office 4 August 2024
- President: Sviatlana Tsikhanouskaya
- Preceded by: Valery Kavaleuski

Personal details
- Born: 13 November 1962 (age 63) Minsk, Byelorussian SSR, Soviet Union
- Education: Belarusian State University

Vladzimir Arkadyevich Astapenka (Belarusian: Уладзімір Аркадзьевіч Астапенка, romanized: Uladzimir Arkadzevich Astapenka) is a Belarusian diplomat who was ambassador to Cuba, Argentina, Chile, Paraguay and Peru in the 2010s. Astapenka resigned in September 2020 in alignment with the 2020–2021 Belarusian protests that followed the 2020 Belarusian presidential election He was nominated to several positions in the Belarusian opposition, including Deputy Representative for Foreign Affairs of the Belarusian United Transitional Cabinet. and head of the Mission for Democratic Belarus in Brussels in October 2022.

== Birth and education ==
Vladzimir Astapenka was born on 13 November 1962. He studied Moscow State Institute of International Relations from 1980 to 1985. In 2000, he obtained his Candidate of Sciences degree (equivalent to a PhD) in international law for his thesis on "Evolution of the European Union in the light of the provisions of the Amsterdam Treaty of 1999".

== University administration ==
In 2002 and 2003, as Vice-President for International Relations of Belarusian State University (BSU), Astapenka promoted Belarusian interests in relation to European transport links and the 2004 enlargement of the European Union. He has also held the positions of Vice Rector and Head of the Chair of International Private and European Law at BSU.

== Diplomat ==
Prior to 1991, Astapenka started work at the Ministry of Foreign Affairs as the Third Secretary of the Byelorussian Soviet Socialist Republic.

After Belarus became the Republic of Belarus in 1991, Astapenka became Vice Minister for Foreign Affairs. He spent time as a diplomat in Belgium and The Netherlands. During the 2010s, Astapenka was Belarusian ambassador to Cuba. In 2019, he was Belarusian ambassador to Argentina and Chile. In 2020, he was simultaneously Belarusian ambassador to Argentina, Chile, Paraguay and Peru.

=== 2020–2021 Belarusian protests ===
Astapenka submitted his resignation from his ambassadorial positions on 23 September 2020, the day of Alexander Lukashenko's formal inauguration as re-elected president, during the 2020–2021 Belarusian protests that followed the 2020 Belarusian presidential election. Astapenka described the date when he submitted his resignation was symbolic, and stated, "I believe in a better future for the Belarusian people!"

In May 2021, when chairing a panel discussion organised by members of the European Parliament, Astapenka described Lukashenko as governing with a "dictatorial style" with an "illegitimate regime ... waging a war against the people of Belarus[,] throwing hundreds of peaceful protesters to jails and terrorizing the population."

=== Belarusian opposition ===
Astapenka was appointed deputy head of National Anti-Crisis Management, an opposition group aiming to coordinate a Belarusian transition to democracy. In September 2022, Astapenka was appointed Deputy Representative for Foreign Affairs of the Belarusian United Transitional Cabinet. In 2024, he was appointed Acting Representative, and then Representative of the Cabinet for International and European Cooperation.

In October 2022, he was appointed as head of the Mission for Democratic Belarus in Brussels. Aims of the Mission include hosting Belarusian non-governmental organizations and representatives of the Belarusian diaspora and taking on the role of "Free Belarus". As of October 2022, the Mission aimed to obtain diplomatic status with Belgian authorities. Astapenka was a speaker at the October 2022 1st European Political Community Summit held in Prague.

When asked about Belarusian involvement in the 2022 Russian invasion of Ukraine in December 2022, Astapenka stated that direct Belarusian military involvement in attacking Ukraine would be resisted by Belarusian soldiers and citizens, and risked destabilising Lukashenko's hold on power. Astapenka predicted that if Russia lost its war in Ukraine, then Lukashenko's power would be greatly weakened.

== Legal case ==
On 21 December 2022, special proceedings (a trial in absentia) began against Astapenka at a court in Minsk, with charges under Chapter 1, Article 14 and Chapter 3, Article 210 of the Criminal Code of Belarus. In early 2023, he was sentenced in absentia to five years in prison (the sentence was immediately reduced by one year under an amnesty due to the National Unity Day) and a fine of 18,500 Belarusian rubles.
