= United Transitional Cabinet of Belarus =

Belarusian government in exile since 2022

- Аб’яднаны Пераходны Кабінет Беларусі; Abjadnany Pierachodny Kabiniet Bielarusi
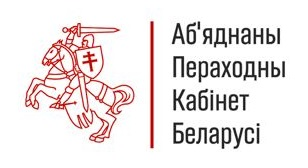
- Flag Logo

Overview
- Established: 9 August 2022
- State: Belarus
- Leader: Sviatlana Tsikhanouskaya
- Appointed by: Coordination Council
- Responsible to: Coordination Council
- Headquarters: Vilnius, Lithuania (in exile)
- Website: https://belaruscabinet.org

The United Transitional Cabinet of Belarus (Belarusian: Аб’яднаны пераходны кабінет Беларусі, romanized: Abjadnany pierachodny kabiniet Biełarusi) is a government in exile for Belarus that was formed in August 2022.

== Creation ==
Following the disputed 2020 Belarusian presidential election, opposition forces, led by presidential candidate Sviatlana Tsikhanouskaya formed a Coordination Council to facilitate a transition to democracy in the country. Tsikhanouskaya and several other members of the council were forced to leave Belarus or were placed under arrest during protests that broke out following the election.

The United Transitional Cabinet was formed on 9 August 2022 during a two-day conference in Vilnius after members of the Belarusian opposition requested Tsikhanouskaya to form "a united interim government".

== Aims and guidelines ==
The stated aims of the United Transitional Cabinet are as follows:

- "Defend the independence and sovereignty of the Republic of Belarus, represent the national interests of Belarus."
- "Carry out the de facto de-occupation of Belarus."
- "Restore constitutional legality and the rule of law."
- "Develop and implement measures to thwart the illegal retention of power, ensure the transit of power from dictatorship to democracy, and create conditions for fair and free elections."
- "Develop and implement the solutions needed to secure a democratic change in Belarus."

In August 2024, the Coordination Council, the United Transitional Cabinet, Tsikhanouskaya and her administrative Office published an agreement describing principles and procedures of their respective roles, power relations, and dispute resolution procedures. Article 4.3 of the agreement defines the powers of the "National Leader" (initially Tsikhanouskaya based on the 2020 presidential election) and of the Coordination Council in relation to appointing and dismissing cabinet members. Both the National Leader and the Coordination Council need to give the other 15 days for responses to proposed appointments or dismissals; the National Leader makes the final decision.

== Activities ==
In August 2022, activities of the Cabinet included the preparation of legal documents to define structures, responsibilities, decision-making methods, and selection of staff. During a meeting with European Parliament President Roberta Metsola, Tsikhanouskaya announced plans for the Cabinet to issue alternative passports for Belarusians in 2024.

The Cabinet issued some awards:

- the Cross of Good Neighbourhood (Belarusian: Крыж добрасуседства, romanized: Kryž dobrasusiedstva, Russian: Крест добрососедства, romanized: Krest dobrososedstva) - to be awarded to outstanding individuals who significantly help the cause of Belarusians. Recipients include Roberta Metsola, Stefan Eriksson and Þórdís Gylfadóttir.
- the Medal of Honor and Dignity - (Belarusian: Медаль За гонар і годнасць, romanized: Miedaĺ Za honar i hodnasć, Russian: Медаль Почета и Достоинства, romanized: Medal' Pocheta i Dostoinstva) posthumously awarded to families of Belarusian soldiers fighting for Ukraine.

== Reaction ==
The European Parliament passed a resolution welcoming the formation of the United Transitional Cabinet on 24 November 2022.

The European Union did not recognise Lukashenko's claimed victory in the 2020 presidential election in Belarus stating that "These elections were neither free nor fair. The European Union considers their results falsified and therefore does not recognise the election results announced by the Central Election Commission of Belarus.

Some leaders of the democratic movement in Belarus, including former presidential candidates, have not recognised the United Transitional Cabinet. Their main arguments are that no one elected the cabinet members, and therefore in their opinion the UTC does not represent the people. One former presidential candidate of 2010, Andrei Sannikov, called the members of the cabinet "impostors". Another former presidential candidate for 2020 Valery Tsepkalo stated that Tsikhanouskaya's office, the Cabinet and the Coordination Council are "fake structures", "appointed by one person", because the Belarusian people did not participate in choosing the members of these structures and did not authorise them to develop programs. They claim that many members of the cabinet are unknown in Belarus.

On 30 August 2022, the KGB designated the Cabinet as an extremist group. A few months later, the Cabinet's Telegram channel was added to the list of extremist materials. The United Transitional Cabinet was designated as a "terrorist organisation" the Belarusian Prosecutor General's Office said on July 9 2025.

== Members ==
Membership of the Cabinet was initially (in August 2022) planned to be for terms of six months. The former and current members of the transitional cabinet are as follows:

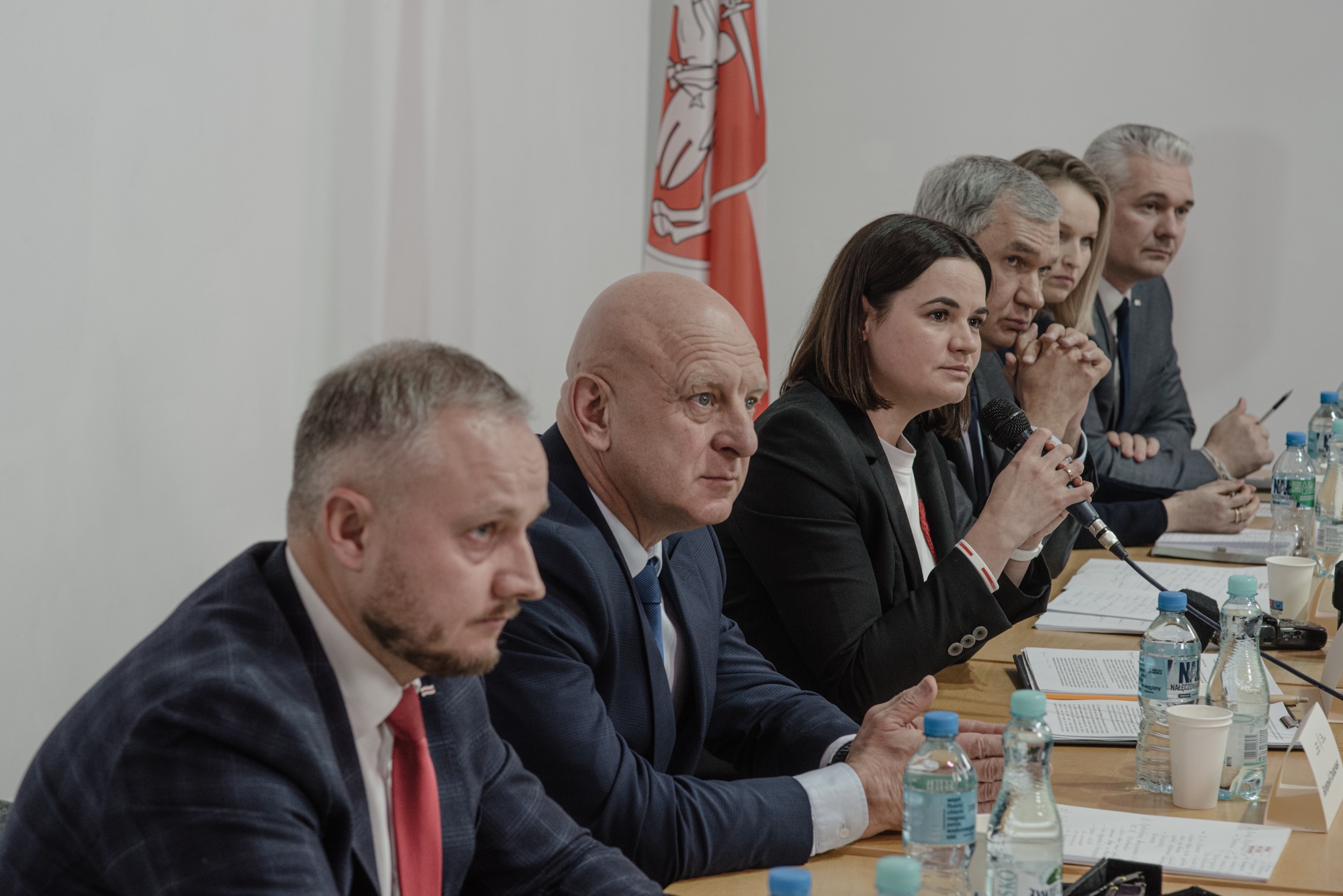
Sviatlana Tsikhanouskaya and United Transitional Cabinet Representatives at a press conference in Warsaw (2 December 2022)

Portfolio	Name	Photo	Dates
Head	Sviatlana Tsikhanouskaya		9 August 2022–present
Deputy Leader and Representative for the Transfer of Power	Pavel Latushko		9 August 2022–present
Representative for Foreign Affairs (Note: (pre-Aug-2024))/International and European Cooperation (Note: (post-Aug-2024))	Valery Kavaleuski (Note: Kavaleuski was also Deputy Head.)		9 August 2022–26 June 2024
Representative for Foreign Affairs/International and European Cooperation	Vladzimir Astapenka; Deputy Rep. for Foreign Affairs, 1 Sep 2022–4 Aug 2024		4 August 2024–present
Representative for Law and Order	Aliaksandr Azarau		9 August 2022–6 August 2023
Representative for Defence and National Security	Valery Sakhashchyk		9 August 2022–August 2024
Representative for Defence and National Security	Vadzim Kabanchuk		4 August 2024–present
Representative for Finance and Economy	Tatsiana Zaretskaya (Note: Resigned.)		9 September–2 November 2022
Representative for Finance and Economy	Alisa Ryzhychenka		11 August 2025–present
Representative for National Revival	Alina Koushyk		16 September 2022–11 August 2025
Representative for National Revival	Pavel Barkouski		11 August 2025–present
Representative for Social Issues	Volha Harbunova		26 December 2022–20 September 2024
Representative for Social Issues	Volha Zazulinskaya		20 September 2024–Aug 2026
Representative for Social Issues	Veranika Stankevich		9 October 2026–present
Representative for Youth Policy	Marharyta Vorychava		4 August 2024–present

=== Cabinet reshuffles ===
By 2023, the Belarusian Coordination Council had started taking a role as a proto-parliament. In August 2023, it exercised the principle of separation of powers by withdrawing confidence in Aliaksandr Azarau as Representative for Law and Order. Tsikhanouskaya accepted the Council's decision and Azarau was dismissed from the Cabinet. In August 2024, the name of the Foreign Affairs portfolio, run by Valery Kavaleuski until June 2024, was changed to "European and International Cooperation", with Vladzimir Astapenka taking the position.

On 11 August 2025, Alisa Ryzhychenka was announced by Svitlana Tsikhanouskaya as the new Representative for Finances and Economy. Pavel Barkouski was appointed as the new Representative for National Revival, replacing Alina Koushyk. Irena Katsialovich and Andrei Larukhin were announced as Deputy Representatives of National Revival, being responsible for culture and education/science respectively. Tsikhanouskaya stated that she was looking to re-establish the position of Representative for Law and Order, a position that was given to Aliaksandr Azarau until his dismissal.

== See also ==
- Belarusian democracy movement
- Coordination Council (Belarus)
- Rada of the Belarusian Democratic Republic
- Belarusian partisan movement (2020–present)
