= Veranika Stankevich =

Belarusian activist and politician

- Occupations: Human rights defender, politician
- Employer: United Transitional Cabinet of Belarus (2026–)

Veranika Stankevich (also Veronika, Belarusian: Вераніка Станкевіч) is a Belarusian human rights activist who became Representative for Social Issues in the United Transitional Cabinet of Belarus in October 2026.

== Youth and education ==
Stankevich's parents are engineers. Stankevich started studies at Belarusian State University (BSU), during which she attended theatre activities. Her mother wanted Stankevich to become an English teacher and was "unenthusiastic" about film and theatre, so Stankevich chose radio and television studies in the BSU Faculty of Journalism, where she made long-term friendships, and decided that she didn't want a career in journalism. She started earning money in advertising during her studies.

== Activism ==
Stankevich describes herself as apolitical prior to the 2020 Belarusian presidential election and protests and repression that followed. She joined a volunteer group "Honest People", and then the public relations team of National Anti-Crisis Management. In response to the risks of government repression, Stankevich left Belarus in December 2020, initially intending to leave "only for three months".

In April 2026, Stankevich was the coordinator of the group "Volnyja" (or Volnyia), involving a dozen paid employees and 180 volunteers, which aims to help former political prisoners. Stankevich stated that Volnyja had helped about 500 people with resocialisation, adaptation, and in some cases with financial support.

== Politics ==
In late 2026, the Latushka Coalition and For Freedom Movement faction of the Belarusian Coordination Council nominated Stankevich as a candidate for the position of Representative for Social Issues in the United Transitional Cabinet of Belarus. Yuliya Mitskevich was also nominated as a candidate for the position. On 8 October, the Coordination Council interviewed Stankevich, Mitskevich, and a third candidate, ranked the three candidates, and recommended Stankevich based on the ranking. On 9 October, Sviatlana Tsikhanouskaya, head of the United Transitional Cabinet, appointed Stankevich as recommended by the Coordination Council.
