= Marharyta Vorychava =

Belarusian activist (born 2001)

- Born: 6 June 2001
- Occupation: Politician, social activist
- Parent(s): Inesa Vorychava

Marharyta Vorychava (Belarusian: Маргарыта Паўлаўна Ворыхава; also Margarita Vorikhova, Marharyta Vorykhava, Margo Vorykhava) is a Belarusian activist and politician. In August 2024, Vorychava was nominated as Representative for Youth in the United Transitional Cabinet of Belarus.

== Activism ==
Vorychava's activist priorities are gender equality, gender diversity and European integration.

Vorychava was active in the European Youth Parliament, the Belarusian Students' Association, and the Council of Europe Contact Group on Belarus.

== Political appointments ==
In the context of Belarusian opposition political structures, Vorychava was appointed as Advisor to Sviatlana Tsikhanouskaya on Youth Policy and Students and is a member of the Belarusian Coordination Council.

Vorychava was elected as a member of Council of Europe's Advisory Council on Youth in 2023, and in April 2024 was elected as vice-chair of the bureau (the governing body) of the Advisory Council.

In August 2024, Vorychava was nominated as Representative for Youth in the United Transitional Cabinet of Belarus.

== Repression ==
On 30 November 2023, Vorychava's mother, Inesa Vorychava, was detained for four hours of questioning by authorities in Novopolotsk. Marharyta Vorychava interpreted the questioning as a form of repression in retaliation for her political activism.

== Points of view ==
In 2024, Vorychava described her views on Belarusian nationalism as seeing it as a process that should evolve with context, with key ideas being freedom, independence and equality.

In late August 2024, Vorychava criticised a proposal by Belarusian president Alexander Lukashenko to build a "Harvard-style 'educational hub" to convince Belarusians not to emigrate. She stated, "We don't need another 'hub' or empty promises. We need to rebuild the country from the ground up, starting with the restoration of democracy, respect for human rights, and the release of all political prisoners."

== Awards ==
Vorychava was given the "Young Women of Europe" award for 2023 by the Women of Europe Awards group of European Movement International.
