= Alisa Ryzhychenka =

Belarusian politician

- Alma mater: Belarus State Economic University; University of Vienna
- Occupation: Politician

Alisa Ryzhychenka (Belarusian: Аліса Віктараўна Рыжычэнка) is a Belarusian politician who became the Representative for Economy and Finance in the United Transitional Cabinet of Belarus in August 2025. Ryzhychenka's role in the cabinet is to plan for economic and financial strategy in the hypothetical transition from the Alexander Lukashenko presidency of Belarus to a democratic system. She proposes economic liberalization along with training and job offers for people losing their jobs. Ryzhychenka lives in Austria as of August 2025.

== Youth and education ==
Ryzhychenka grew up in Polotsk. Her mother is Russian, born in Germany, and worked as an engineer. Her father, who worked at Rosneft in Novopolotsk was Belarusian. He died when Ryzhychenka was 14, leaving the family in poverty. Ryzhychenka sees herself in childhood as having "always [fought] for justice".

Ryzhychenka obtained a master's degree in economics at Belarus State Economic University and a master's degree in political sciences at the University of Vienna. As of August 2025, she intended to submit a university thesis in Austria by around October 2025.

== Administration ==
Ryzhychenka studied public administration, and worked at a bank and a real estate agency, achieving a management position. During her graduate studies, she found inefficiencies in the administration of real estate commerce that, in her view, led to major lost revenue for the state. According to Ryzhychenka, she made proposals that were seen as positive at lower administrative levels, but at level of the Presidential Administration were unofficially rejected because the proposed reforms would have blocked corruption. Ryzhychenka felt dissuaded from working in public administration, and continued in the private sector in Belarus until 2018.

== Activism ==
Ryzhychenka stated that while in Austria, she helped Belarusians obtain political asylum. Since 2020, she was active in several Belarusian non-governmental organisations.

== United Transitional Cabinet Representative ==
In July 2025, the Belarusian Coordination Council recommended appointing Ryzhychenka as Representative for Economy and Finance in the United Transitional Cabinet of Belarus, with 36 votes in favour, five against, and eight abstentions. She was appointed to the position on 11 August 2025.

As Representative for Economy and Finance, Ryzhychenka's role should cover plans for economic and financial strategy during a transitional period, cooperating with experts and international institutions. Initial steps would include assessing Belarusian state assets and analysing weaknesses in the Belarusian economy.

Ryzhychenka viewed part of her role as reducing the risk that economic plans would be imposed during a transition, stating, "If we don't offer our vision of a help plan, everyone will decide for us." She favoured a pro-European rather than pro-Russian economic vision for Belarus.

According to Sviatlana Tsikhanouskaya, European Commission President Ursula von der Leyen promised a €3 billion assistance fund for Belarus during a democratic transition. Ryzhychenka stated that European Union (EU) norms and standards should be implemented in Belarusian legislation.

Ryzhychenka stated that she was in favour of economic liberalization, tax reform, debt restructuring via the European Investment Bank and the International Monetary Fund, deregulation for small and medium enterprises, and the "abolition of policy planning". She stated that she was in favour of privatization "on a scale that won't harm society". She proposed that this by done via an international audit of public companies. Efficient ones would be given "crisis managers", and inefficient ones would be closed or privatized. Workers losing their jobs would be offered training or job transfers.

Ryzhychenka described the Belarusian pension system in August 2025 as being an unviable pyramid scheme. She expected that a reform would take 7–10 years.

Ryzhychenka proposed removing the budget allocation for "patriotism", which was spent on military uniforms for children, arming children with automatic weapons, hanging flags, coats of arms and portraits of Lukashenko.

Ryzhychenka stated that she favoured reduced energy dependence on Russia. She this as especially important during a transition period from the Alexander Lukashenko administration, since Russian authorities could cut off the supply of natural gas during a transition.

In August 2025, Ryzhychenka stated that she expected to have "signed road maps with international partners" with "specific figures, deadlines, and ... an action plan" ready within eighteen months, so that if democratic changes became possible in Belarus, the democratic groups in exile would be ready to compete with pro-Russian groups.

Ryzhychenka described the financing of independent media as a "cross-cutting" issue during a transition, which would need to be discussed with international partners.

== Coordination Council ==
In May 2026, Ryzhychenka was elected as a delegate to the fourth convocation of the Coordination Council from the European Choice faction.

== Views ==
=== Shock therapy ===
Ryzhychenka views economic shock therapy in Poland as having been successful.

=== Lukashenko administration ===
In September 2024, Ryzychenka viewed the economy of Belarus as being in difficulty, and stated that Belarusian private businesses were being "given" to Russian owners as a consequence of the Lukashenko government receiving help from Russia.

In August 2025, Ryzhychenka stated that all big business, above a turnover of US$1 million, necessarily paid bribes to Lukashenko. She stated that she was opposed to corruption, and that "the rules of the game" should be changed to prevent corruption in Belarus.

She viewed Lukashenko as being uniquely motivated by corruption in the interests of his family, himself, and his friends, based on 30 years of evidence.

=== Sexism ===
Ryzhychenka stated that she had experienced sexism throughout her life, in relation to taking leadership positions and speaking out. She viewed sexism as traditional in Belarus.

=== Immigration ===
In July 2024, Ryzhychenka criticised the immigration of workers to Belarus from Asia, expressing concern that the immigrants might not have the appropriate skills, and that, as Islam is a major religion in Asia, social tensions could increase due to islamophobia ("a completely different mentality").

== Personal life ==
Ryzhychenka and her husband, who had one son together, divorced after she moved to Austria in 2018. Formalising her legal status in Austria took four years.

Ryzhychenka stated in August 2025 that she took precautions against the risks to Belarusian politicians-in-exile, and felt safe in Austria.
