= Machulishchy =

Urban-type settlement in Minsk Region, Belarus

Machulishchy Мачулішчы (Belarusian) Мачулищи (Russian)
- Urban-type settlement
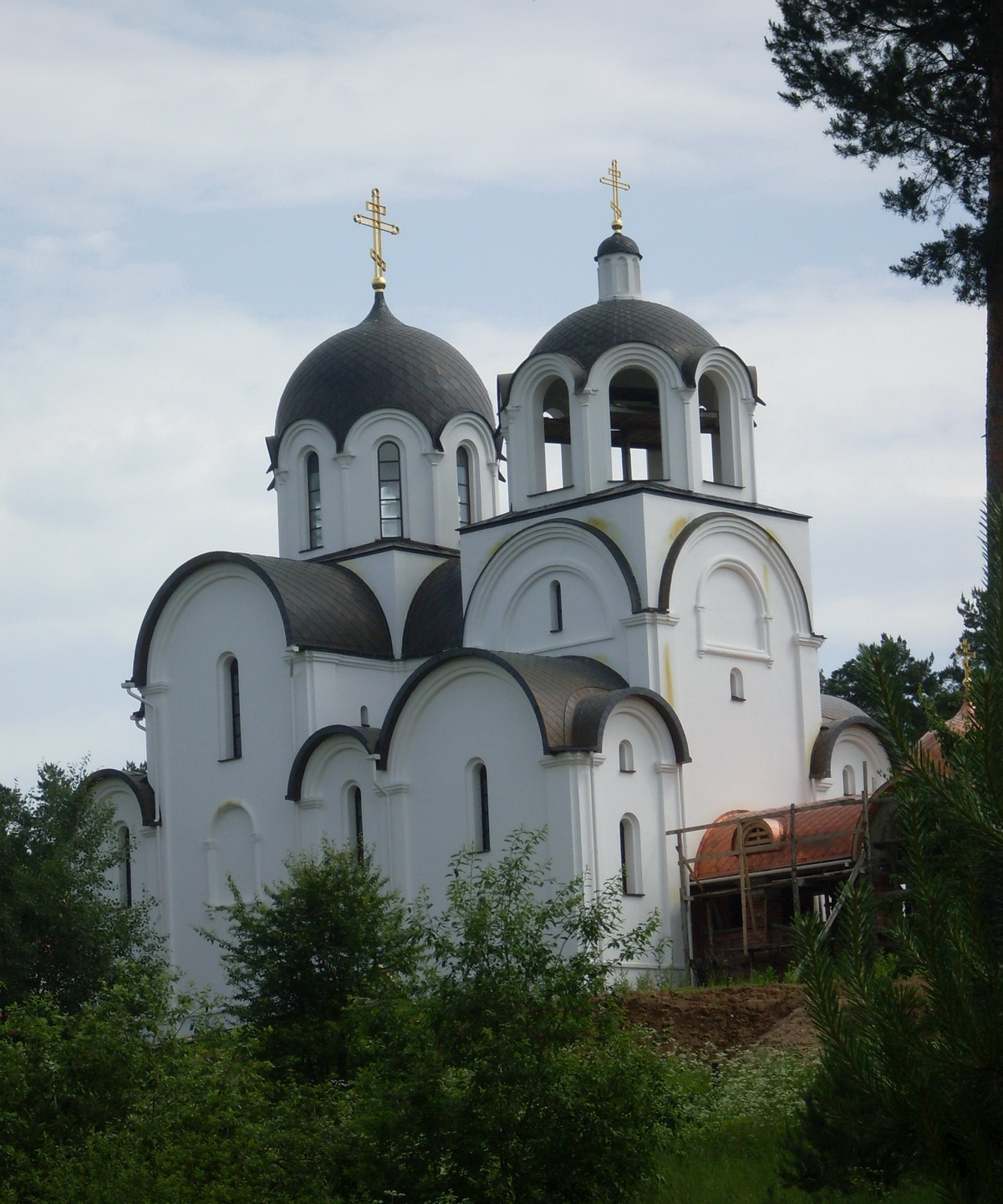
- Orthodox church of St. Pantaleon

- Location within Belarus
- Coordinates: 53°46′53″N 27°35′45″E
- Country: Belarus
- Region: Minsk Region
- District: Minsk District
- Founded: 1590
- Elevation: 228 m (748 ft)

Population (2026)
  - Total: 10,869
- Time zone: UTC+3 (MSK)
- Postal code: 223012
- License plate: 5
- Website: Official website

Machulishchy (Note: Belarusian: Мачулішчы, romanized: Mačuliščy; Russian: Мачулищи, romanized: Machulishchi; Polish: Moczuliszcze.) is an urban-type settlement in Minsk District, Minsk Region, Belarus. In 2010, it had a population of 7,300. As of 2026, it has a population of 10,869.

== History ==
The settlement was first mentioned in 1590. In 1997, it received the status of urban-type settlement (Russian: городской посёлок).

== Geography ==
Situated in southern suburb of Minsk, it is served by a railway station on the Minsk-Babruysk-Gomel and by the M1 highway. A major Soviet air base operated adjacent to the west side of the town during the Cold War.

== Gallery ==
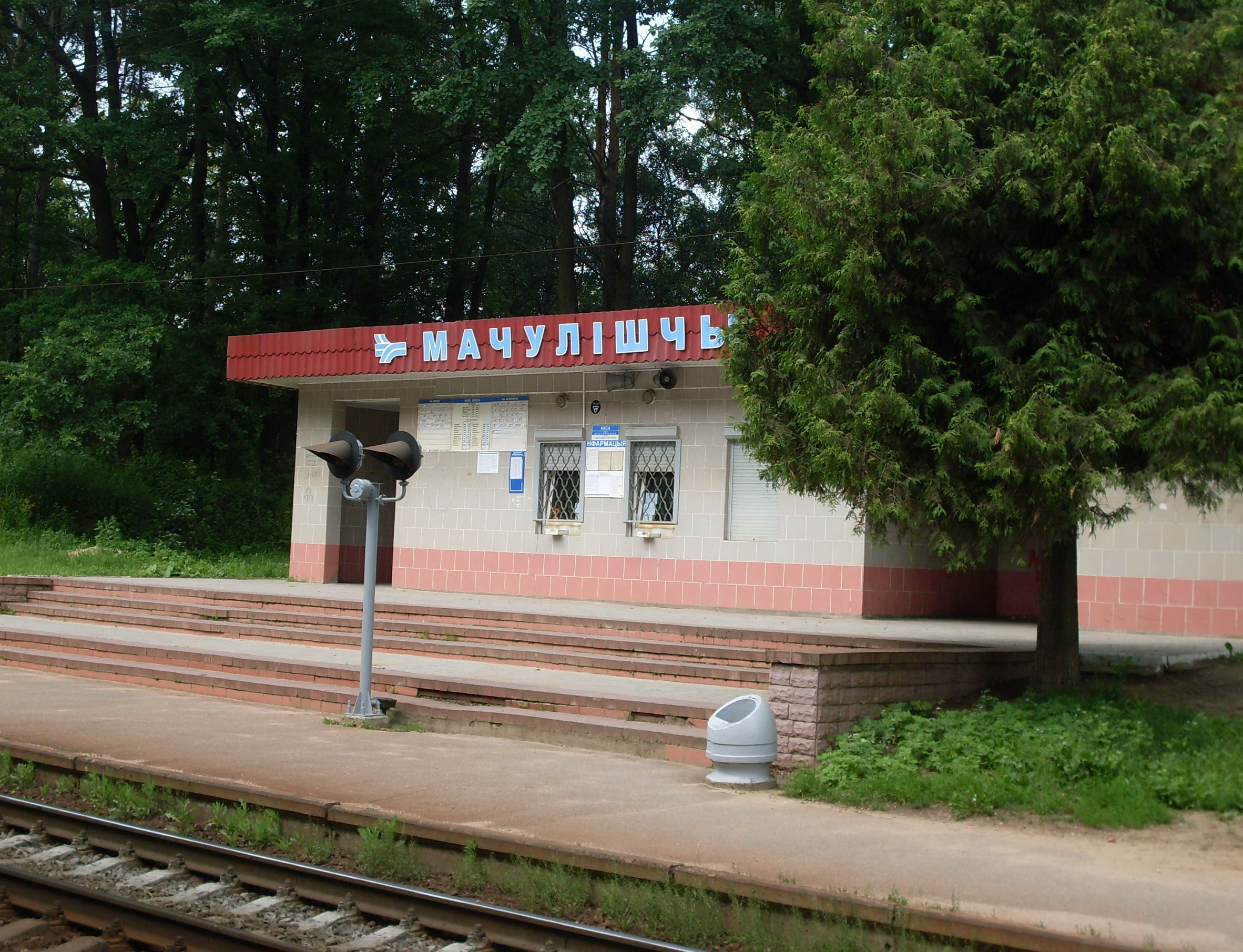
Railway station

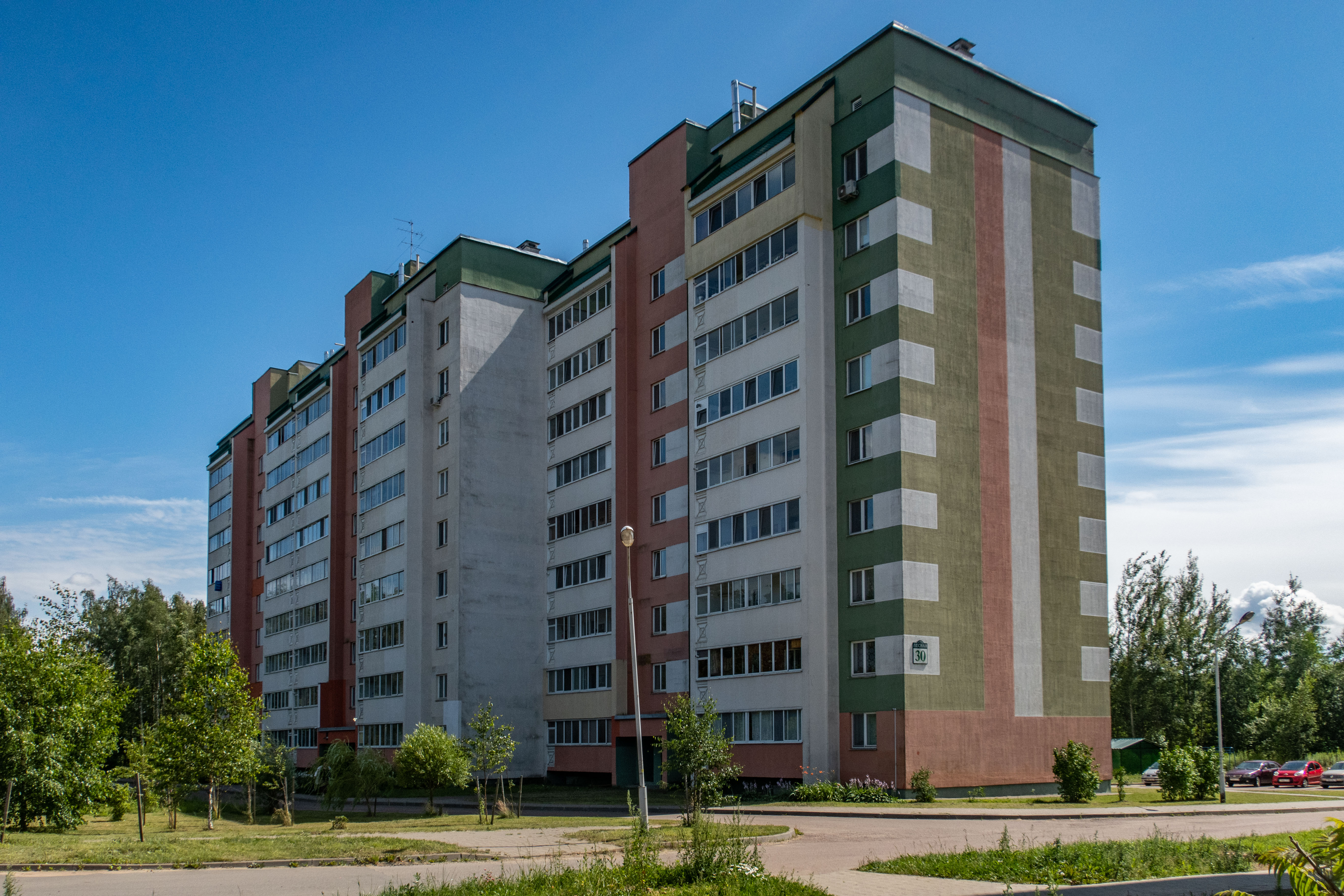
Multi-storeyed buildings

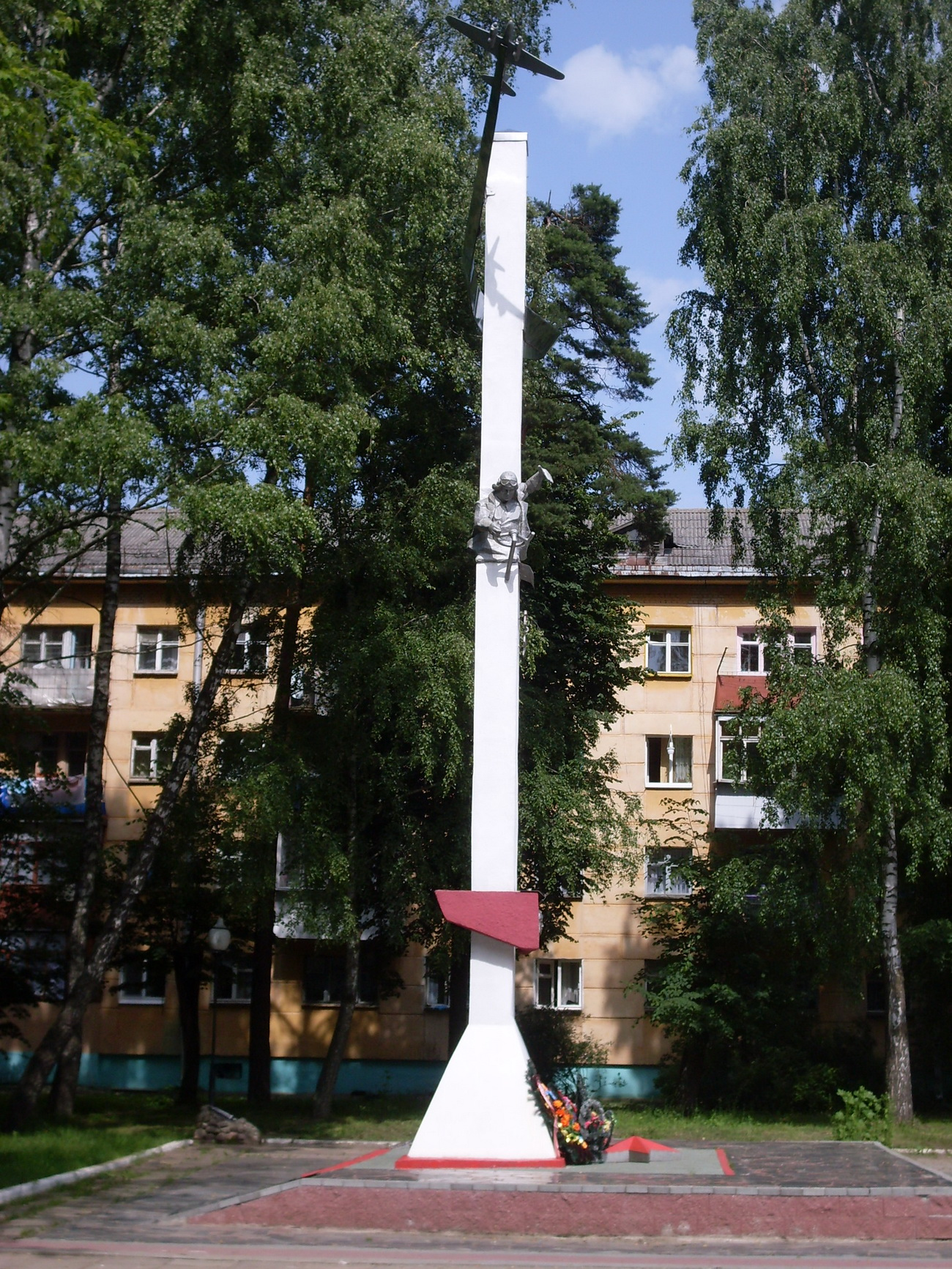
Memorial obelisk devoted to World War II veterans

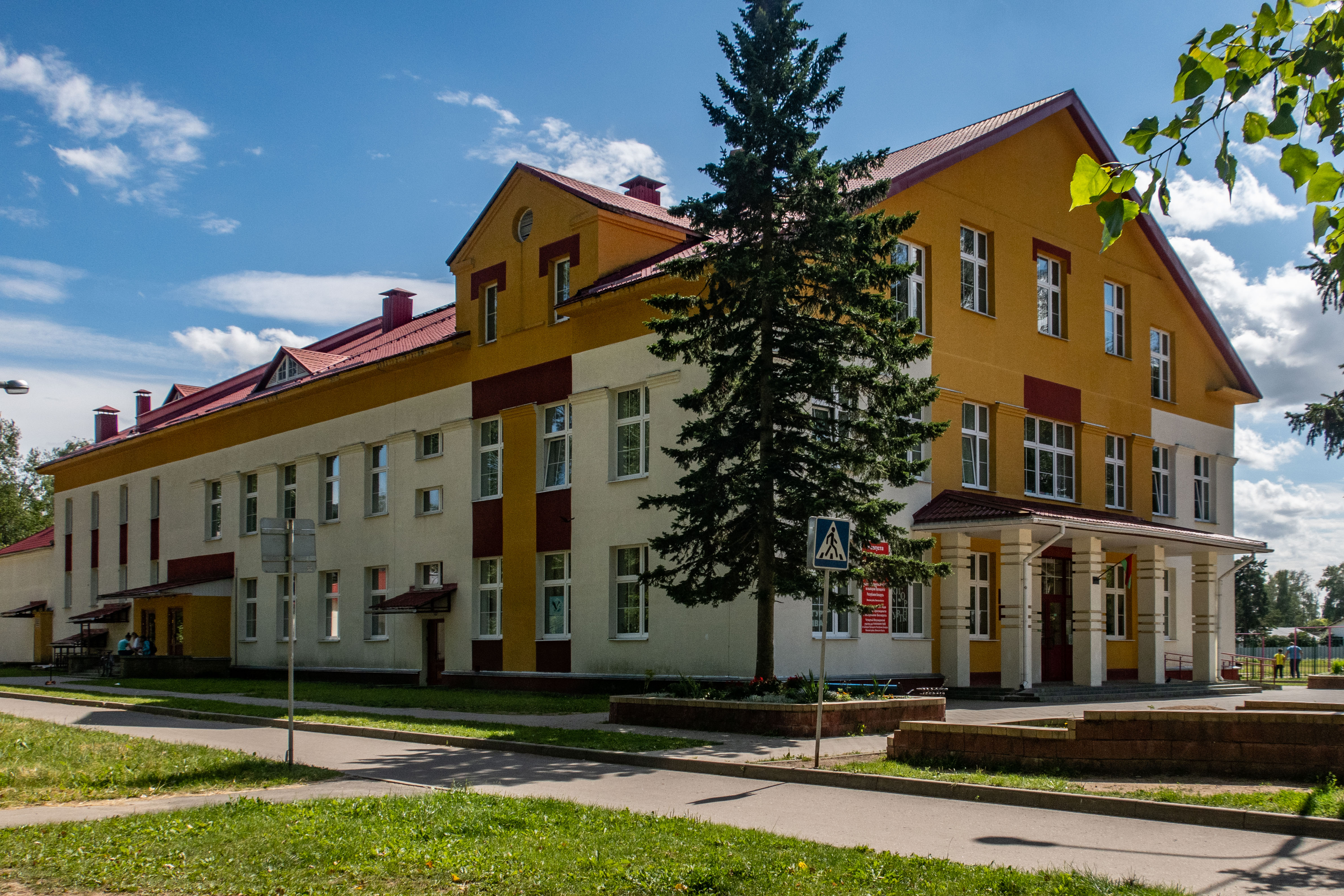
House of culture

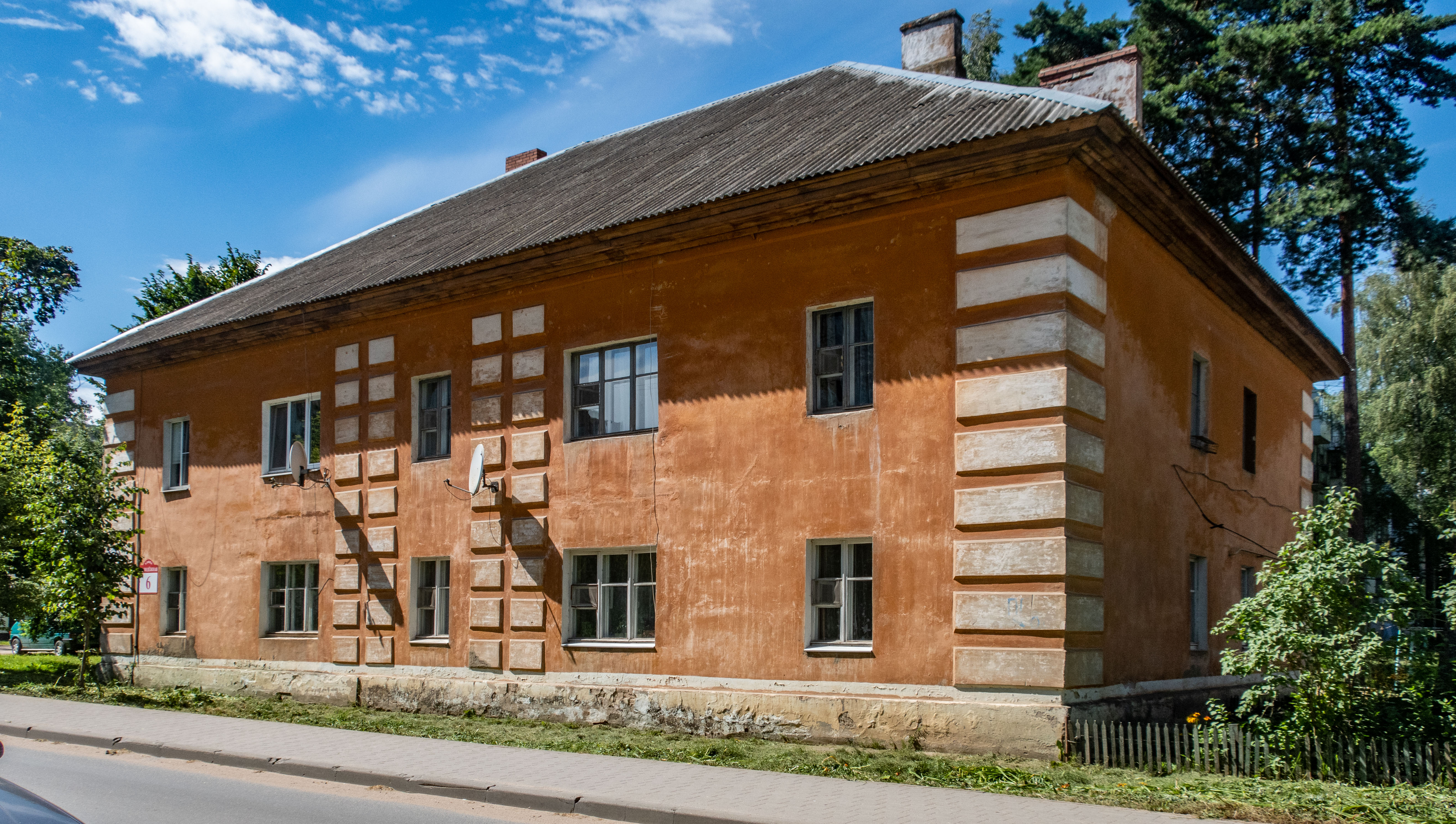
Older buildings
