= BYPOL =

Belarusian human rights non-governmental organization

- Association of Security Forces of Belarus
- Аб'яднанне сілавікоў Беларусі
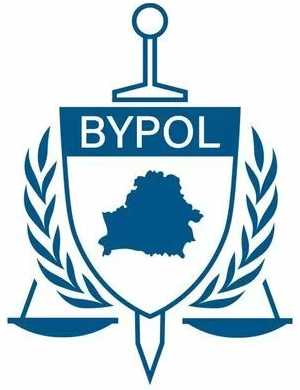
- Formation: 20 October 2020
- Headquarters: ul. Długa 29, 00–238 Warsaw, Poland
- Fields: 2022 rail war in Belarus Machulishchy air base attack
- Public representatives: Aliaksandr Azarau; Vladimir Zhygar; Matvey Kupreychik; Stanislav Luponosov; Oleg Talerchik
- Website: bypol.org

The Association of Security Forces of Belarus (Belarusian: Аб'яднанне сілавікоў Беларусі, romanized: Abjadnannie siłavikow Biełarusi), also known as BYPOL, is a Belarusian organization that was created by former employees of Belarusian law enforcement agencies to counter the Belarusian authorities. The association has channels on YouTube and Telegram, on which it publishes various videos related to the security forces, and also doxes law enforcement officers.

The initiative opposes President Alexander Lukashenko, and also does not recognize his legitimacy. Former security officials consider Sviatlana Tsikhanouskaya to be president.

In June 2023, the BYPOL association split in two organizations. While one continues to operate under the name BYPOL, another association of former employees of law enforcement agencies is called BELPOL.

== Background ==
On 9 August 2020, after the announcement of the results of the presidential election, mass protests began throughout the country. During clashes between some protesters and law enforcement officers, the police used tear gas, stun grenades, water cannons and rubber bullets. The excessive cruelty with which security forces treated protesters became public. Some law enforcement officers did not agree with the policy of Alexander Lukashenko, as a result of which they resigned. Some of the employees stayed in Belarus, some emigrated to other countries.

== Creation ==
On 20 October 2020, in Warsaw, at the Center of Belarusian Solidarity, Svetlana Tikhanovskaya met with former employees of law enforcement agencies, "who went over to the side of the people." This meeting was attended by Captain of Justice Andrei Ostapovich, Major of Justice Igor Loban, senior lieutenant of militia Matvey Kupreichik, lieutenant of militia Vladimir Zhigar. It was at this meeting that they announced their intention to create a trade union of law enforcement agencies. Tikhanovskaya supported the creation of the initiative and proposed "holding a separate closed meeting on the issue of transferring law enforcement officers to the side of the Belarusian people".

== Goals ==
- The unification of law enforcement officers who do not support the government into an organized structure, ready to overthrow the current government in Belarus.
- Creation of an independent trade union of law enforcement agencies.
- Development of provisions for the future reform of law enforcement agencies.
- Collection of evidence on crimes committed against protesting Belarusian citizens.
- Collection of information about alleged corruption.
- Cooperation in the international arena in the investigation and judicial review of alleged crimes against humanity, sanctions and criminal prosecution of identified persons at the international level.

== Leadership and members ==
BYPOL's initial leader, at its creation as a foundation under Polish law in May 2021, was Aliaksandr Azarau.

In August 2022, Azarau claimed that members of the Lukashenko government's official security agencies from the Ministry of Internal Affairs, the Armed Forces, the Investigative Committee, the Ministry of Emergency Situations and the Border Guard Service, "of various ranks", were working with BYPOL.

== Publications ==
External videos
- Обращение Владислава Ботяна

The very first publication on the YouTube channel of the initiative was the appeal of the 4th year cadet of the police department of the Academy of the Ministry of Internal Affairs Vladislav Botyan. In it, against the background of a white-red-white flag, he spoke about his dismissal from the internal affairs bodies. He appealed to the cadets of the Academy of the Ministry of Internal Affairs and urged them to quit their studies and "take the side of the people." by attempting to overthrow the government of Belarus. Botyan also spoke about how he witnessed ballot stuffing during early voting.

Then two videos appeared on the channel called "Heroes in balaclavas." In the first part, the protesters are roughly shoved into a paddy wagon, some are beaten. Everyone is put on their knees on the floor of the van. On the way, the security forces mockingly question some men and study the contents of their phones, in particular, their Telegram subscriptions. The second part shows footage from one of the protests in Minsk.

On 2 December, the initiative published a video of Lukashenko's approach to OMON officers. The video captures the events of the "March of New Belarus", which took place on 23 August and forced Lukashenko to fly over Minsk in a helicopter. Then the head of state, under the supervision of the OMON, with the support of his son Nikolai and a personal doctor, "took part in dispersing" several people who accidentally lingered at the palace after the March had already ended by that time. After the "cleansing" of the territory, Lukashenka generously expressed his gratitude to the security forces, promising not to remain in debt for the "feat" they had accomplished. The security forces are heard joking, cursing and laughing at Lukashenka.

On 10 December, the initiative published a video in which OMON officers insult protesters, using foul language, thereby violating the order of the Ministry of Internal Affairs No. 67 "On the Rules for the Professional Ethics of Police Officers." The video was filmed on August 23 near the Independence Palace in Minsk.

On 17 December, a video about bullying in the Frunzensky District Department of Internal Affairs was published on the YouTube channel. The video is dated 12 August. The footage shows how the detainees, including women and minors, are kneeling or lying face down on the floor with their hands twisted back. During interrogation, people are beaten in the stomach or kidneys and forced to lick a club. During interrogations, people are intimidated and threatened. Some of the detainees were badly beaten, with hematomas, abrasions and bruises on their faces. While another interrogation is going on, in the background, an unknown person in civilian clothes and a balaclava is seen beating a man with a truncheon. Blows and screams are heard in the background on the video.

On 28 December, the initiative published the materials of its investigation into the criminal prosecution of Sergei Tikhanovsky. The initiative claims that Tikhanovsky's case is politically motivated. According to the initiative, long before the arrest of Tikhanovsky and members of his team in connection with their socio-political activities, the Main Directorate for Combating Organized Crime began developing operational records within the framework of the case, which was in the production of the senior detective of the 2nd department of the 3rd department Ivan Tarasik. The general management of this development was carried out by the head of the 3rd department, Mikhail Bedunkevich. As a result, the department failed to find grounds for initiating a criminal case. In this regard, they decided to organize a provocation. The verbal order, according to the initiative, was given by the then Minister of Internal Affairs Yury Karayeu.

On 7 January, in its Telegram channel, the initiative published a secret report on the state of affairs in the structure of the Ministry of Internal Affairs. It contains information on the number of certified employees as of 1 October and other data "for official use".

On 14 January, the initiative published a recording where a man with a voice similar to the voice of the ex-head of the GUBOPiK, and now the deputy minister of internal affairs, the commander of the internal troops, Nikolay Karpenkov, tells how Alexander Taraikovsky died, as well as about a meeting with Alexander Lukashenko, where law enforcement officers what to do with protests and protesters. Presumably the recording was made at the end of October. On the recording, a man with a voice similar to Karpenkov says that the head of state has security forces "covered from all sides in terms of the use of weapons," and also reports that Alexander Taraikovsky died from a rubber bullet that "flew into his chest." He also quotes instructions on how to deal with protesters from the "president". Pavel Latushko stated that this recording will be submitted to the UN Security Council, the European Union, the OSCE and the authorities of Russia and the United States.

In early February, BYPOL spread information that the Belarusian authorities were gathering a peacekeeping contingent of 600 soldiers to be sent to Syria. As stated in the message, the Western and Northwestern operational commands have already received a directive on the selection of military personnel. In this regard, according to the BYPOL group, soldiers allegedly began to leave the armed forces en masse. The Ministry of Defense of Belarus denied this information. Non-state sources, such as Tut.By, also doubted the BYPOL message.

On 2 February, TUT.BY received the results of a phonoscopic examination of a recording published by BYPOL, which is of "great public importance" and caused a resonance not only in Belarus, but also abroad. The audio recording talks about the murder of Alexander Taraikovsky, the use of lethal weapons and "camps for sharp-hoofed." The examination confirmed that the voice on the recording belongs to Nikolai Karpenkov, and did not reveal any signs of editing.

On 4 March 2021, on its YouTube channel, the initiative publishes another audio recording with a voice that allegedly belongs to the former head of the Ministry of Internal Affairs of Belarus Karaev, in which he calls on the security forces to brutally crack down on opposition representatives: "Which threatens you and me, officials. Well, especially if you. Drop everything, find this creature and clean it up. Here is my advice to you.".

== Cooperation with other structures of the Belarusian opposition ==
The initiative took part in the development of the Unified Book of Crime Registration platform. The association also helps to investigate what it considers to be "crimes". BYPOL also has a representative in the National Anti-Crisis Management administration. Together with the administration, they identify those responsible for unjustified and unlawful violence during protests.

== Actions ==
=== Rail war ===
At the beginning of March 2022, there were reports in the media about terrorism against Belarusian railways to interfere with the movement of military trains. Signaling equipment was destroyed in three Belarusian regions, and railway lines were blocked. According to BYPOL, as a result of this operation, the work of several branches of the Belarusian railway was disrupted. Russian Railways has allegedly banned the movement of its rolling stock, including military trains, through the territory of Belarus at night, and Belarusian machinists are allegedly refusing to drive locomotives and travel to hauls. According to BYPOL:

It is our duty – and within our power – to do real things to stop [the war], free ourselves from the occupation of Russian troops and restore the good name of our ancestors. "Rail War" is the knowledge that we inherited, this is what we can do and what each of us can do.

=== Pieramoha Plan ===
In June 2022, BYPOL leader Azarau stated that BYPOL had 200,000 people registered with its Pieramoha Plan (Pieramoha meaning 'victory'; also spelled as Peramoha or Peramoga) to replace the Lukashenko government, with 5,000 people registered for sabotage actions. By October 2022, 800 people had registered for Pieramoha Plan training centres in Poland.

The main tool used to collect data on protest activists was the plan's bot "Peramoga." A user of the messenger Telegram could register in it and expect to receive a mobilization order. During registration, the bot recognized the ID of the Telegram account, street of residence, profession and place of work.

According to OSH Information Group, the data collected by the "Peramoga" bot were sufficient for the authorities to identify some of the protesters by comparing them with data from Belarusian Interior Ministry databases. Natallia Radzina (Russian: Наталья Радина) alleged in NV.ua that there were suspicions of Azarov working for Belarusian secret services. She referred to GUBOPiK broadcasts of videos of people stating that they had been arrested for participation in the Pieramoha Plan.

=== Machulishchy air base attack ===
The organization claimed responsibility for the February 2023 attack on a Russian aircraft at the Machulishchy air base.

== Reactions ==
=== Lukashenko government ===
On 6 March 2021, a criminal case was initiated against the activists of the initiative for inciting hatred. The Prosecutor General's Office of the Lukashenko government stated that a case had been opened against Oleg Talerchik, Igor Logan "and other persons".

On 22 April 2021, the court of the Zheleznodorozhny district of Gomel included the BYPOL telegram channel in the list of extremist materials, and on 12 January 2022, the same court recognized other Internet resources of the initiative, including the Unified Crime Registration Book, as extremist materials. In November 2021, the Belarusian authorities recognized BYPOL as an extremist group. In August 2022, the Supreme Court of Belarus designated the group as a terrorist organization.

On February 15, 2024, Azarau and five other BYPOL founders received lengthy prison terms in absentia.
