= Pavel Barkouski =

Belarusian academic and politician (born 1978)

- Барковский, Павел Владимирович
- Born: 12 December 1978; Minsk
- Education: Faculty of Philosophy and Social Sciences of the Belarusian State University
- Occupations: Philosopher, politician

Pavel Vladimirovich Barkouski (also Barkovsky; Belarusian: Павел Уладзіміравіч Баркоўскі; born December 12, 1978) is a Belarusian philosopher. He was appointed as Representative for National Revival of the United Transitional Cabinet of Belarus in August 2025.

== Youth and education ==
Barkouski was born on December 12, 1978 in Minsk. He obtained an undergraduate degree in philosophy at Belarusian State University (BSU) in 2000 and defended his PhD, "The Theory of Understanding as a Research Project in Contemporary Epistemology", in Minsk in 2005.

== Philosopher ==
Barkouski continued his activities as a philosopher. He was a faculty member of the Faculty of Philosophy and Social Sciences at BSU. He organised a book festival "Pradmova". In September 2020, he resigned from BSU in protest against political pressure on BSU physicist Sviatlana Vovchak. He described the situation in Belarus at the time as a "total regime of violence and lies".

Following his resignation from BSU, Barkouski continued organising the "Pradmova" book festival, continued teaching philosophy at the Belarusian Collegium, and was employed to write advertisements for a computer firm. In August 2025, he was a visiting professor at the Institute of Philosophy and Sociology of the Polish Academy of Sciences.

== United Transitional Cabinet ==
After having been a deputy for Alina Koushyk as Representative for National Revival in the United Transitional Cabinet of Belarus (UTC), Barkouski became the acting representative in November 2024 when Koushyk resigned. In August 2025, he was formally appointed to the position.

In December 2025, Barkouski described his view of the state of Belarusian culture within Belarus and among the diaspora, and actions of the UTC to support Belarusian culture. He viewed much of the production of Belarusian culture, especially including music, theatre and the visual arts, as being repressed within Belarus by self-censorship and institutional censorship, developing well among the diaspora, and permeating back into Belarus by online communication. He cited "Swan Song" by Fyodor Ozerov, shown at the Berlin International Film Festival, as a success of independent Belarusian films, and culture festivals such as the "Northern Lights film festival, Bulbamovie" which became "Tutaka" – a festival of the awakened, in Podlasie.

Barkouski called for Europe to support Belarusian culture as part of the defence against Russia. He stated that the UTC had supported several Belarusian cultural institutes, had successfully applied for three million euros of funding for Belarusian culture from the European Commission. Ongoing UTC cultural projects included the development of a database of Belarusian cultural organisations in Poland and Lithuania that accepted donations as tax deductions under the Polish 1.5% and Lithuanian 1.2% rules, and supporting weekend classes in Belarusian culture for diaspora children.
