= Valery Kavaleuski =

Belarusian diplomat (born 1976)

- Валерый Кавалеўскі
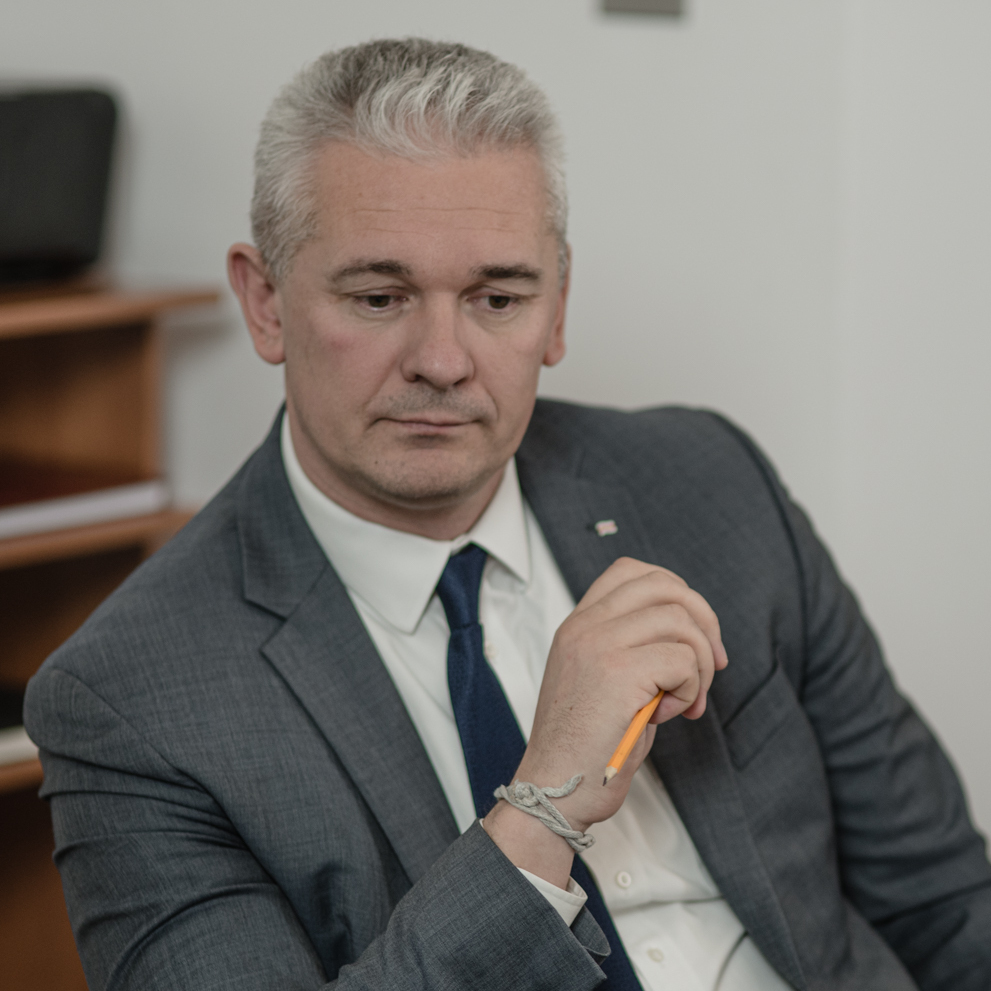

Representative of the United Transitional Cabinet for Foreign Affairs
- In office August 9, 2022 – June 26, 2024
- President: Sviatlana Tsikhanouskaya
- Succeeded by: Vladzimir Astapenka

Personal details
- Born: 1976 (age 49–50) Bieražnoje, Byelorussian SSR, Soviet Union
- Education: Belarusian State University; Walsh School of Foreign Service

Valery Kavaleuski is a Belarusian diplomat and politician. On 9 August 2022, Sviatlana Tsikhanouskaya appointed Kavaleuski as Deputy Head and Representative for Foreign Affairs in the United Transitional Cabinet of Belarus that is opposed to the de facto government of Alexander Lukashenko.

== Childhood and education ==
Valery Kavaleuski was born in the village of Bieražnoje in the Palesse area in southern Belarus in 1976 and graduated from the Berazhnoe Secondary School in 1993.

Kavaleuski obtained a specialist (equivalent of bachelor's) degree in international relations in the Belarusian State University in 1998, an Executive MBA at Kozminski University in 2008, and a Master of Science in Foreign Service (MSFS) degree from the Walsh School of Foreign Service in Georgetown University in 2014.

== Diplomatic service and life in Washington ==
Kavaleuski worked in the Belarusian Ministry of Foreign Affairs from 1998 to 2006. He specialised in Belarus–United States relations and later dealt with human rights issues in multilateral organisations. In June 2005, he represented Belarus at the Council of Europe in Strasbourg as a counsellor in the Division for Human Rights, Department for Humanitarian Cooperation and Human Rights at the ministry. In September 2005, he represented the ministry at a meeting of the International Organization for Migration in Geneva.

From 2001 to 2004, Kavaleuski was seconded to the Belarusian embassy in the United States as first secretary to work on political issues. In 2002, he briefly served as the chargé d'affaires of Belarus in the US. Kavaleuski resigned from diplomatic service during the Jeans Revolution, when Lukashenko remained in power for a third term after the disputed 2006 Belarusian presidential election.

Before joining Sviatlana Tsikhanouskaya's team in December 2020, Kavaleuski worked in the World Bank Group in Washington, DC. Before then, Kavaleuski was an international journalist at Voice of America.

== Socio-cultural activities ==
In 2015, Kavaleuski was Director for Strategy and Public Affairs of the Belarusan-American Association.

== Opposition activities ==
In January 2011, Kavaleuski was arrested by the Belarusian KGB for supporting Andrei Sannikov, who had been a leading candidate in the 2010 Belarusian presidential election. He spent 12 days of administrative arrest in Okrestina Detention Centre and three days in a KGB prison.

On 16 September 2014, Kavaleuski participated in a protest in Washington, D.C. near the Belarusian embassy, calling for information about Viktar Hanchar and Anatol Krasouski, who were forcefully disappeared in 1999 in Minsk.

In 2015, Kavaleuski argued that the Russian–Belarusian agreement for Russia to establish an airbase in Belarus was a violation of the Belarusian Constitution, was against the wishes of Belarusians, and placed Belarus into the "line of conflict" between Russia and the West, at a time when Russia had "become fully committed to a dangerous geopolitical agenda undermining international security".

=== 2020–2021 Belarusian protests ===
Kavaleuski returned from the US to Minsk in August 2020 and participated in the 2020–2021 Belarusian protests that followed the disputed 2020 Belarusian presidential election. He was thrown to the ground during a protest on 22 November 2020 and detained for several days. He joined Sviatlana Tsikhanouskaya in exile in Lithuania in December 2020.

In November 2021, in Canada, Kavaleuski discussed the Belarusian situation with Amnesty International, The Canadian Press and the Halifax International Security Forum.

In July 2022, during the 2022 Russian invasion of Ukraine, Kavaleuski headed Tsikhanouskaya's office in Kyiv. He negotiated conditions for allowing Belarusians supporting Ukraine to stay in Ukraine with Dmytro Lubinets, the Ukrainian Human Rights Ombudsman.

=== The United Transitional Cabinet of Belarus ===
Kavaleuski was appointed to the Belarusian United Transitional Cabinet, a government-in-exile, on 9 August 2022. In October, Kavaleuski and Tsikhanouskaya started negotiating an alliance with the Ukrainian government against the possibility of Russia taking full control of Belarus.

On 26 June 2024, Kavaleuski resigned from the UTC. He referred to differences on strategic approaches and tactical matters among his reasons for resigning.

== Other administrative roles ==
As of August 2024, Kavaleuski is the head of the Euro-Atlantic Affairs Agency, officially launched on 1 August 2024.

== Points of view ==
In November 2021, Kavaleuski described the Belarusian situation, stating, "What's happening in Belarus, it's like black and white. People want democracy and freedom, and there is no geopolitical undertone."
