= GUBOPiK =

Belarusian state security service

Main Directorate for Combating Organized Crime and Corruption
- Галоўнае ўпраўленне па барацьбе з арганізаванай злачыннасцю і карупцыяй Haloŭnaje ŭpraŭliennie pa baraćbie z arhanizavanaj zlačynnasciu i karupcyjaj
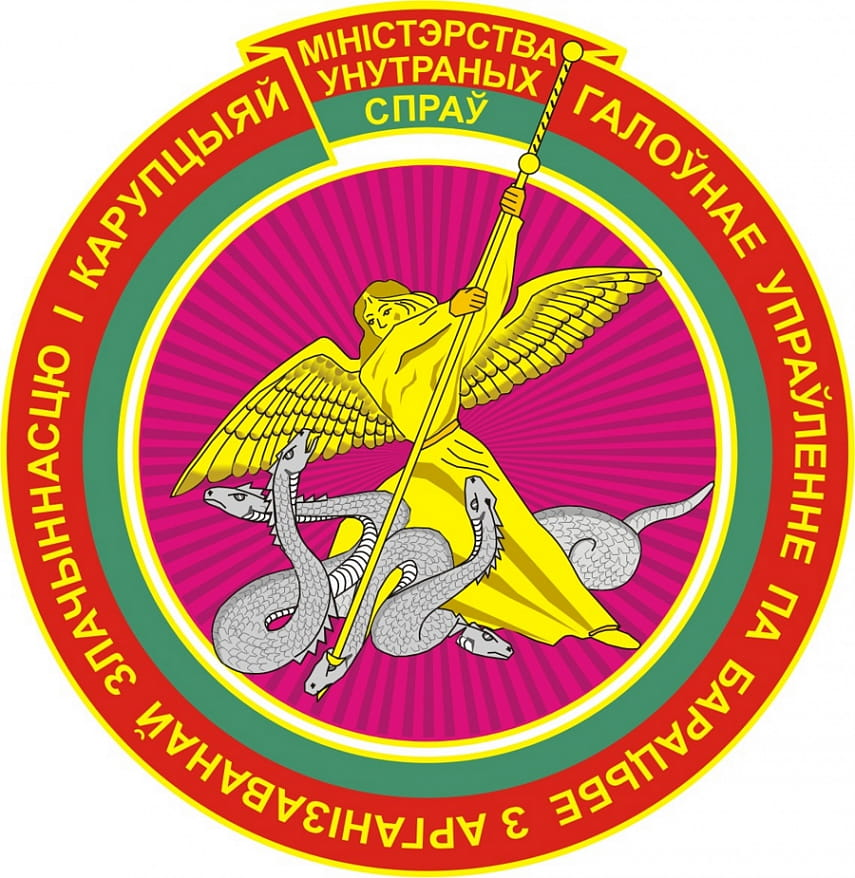
- Emblem

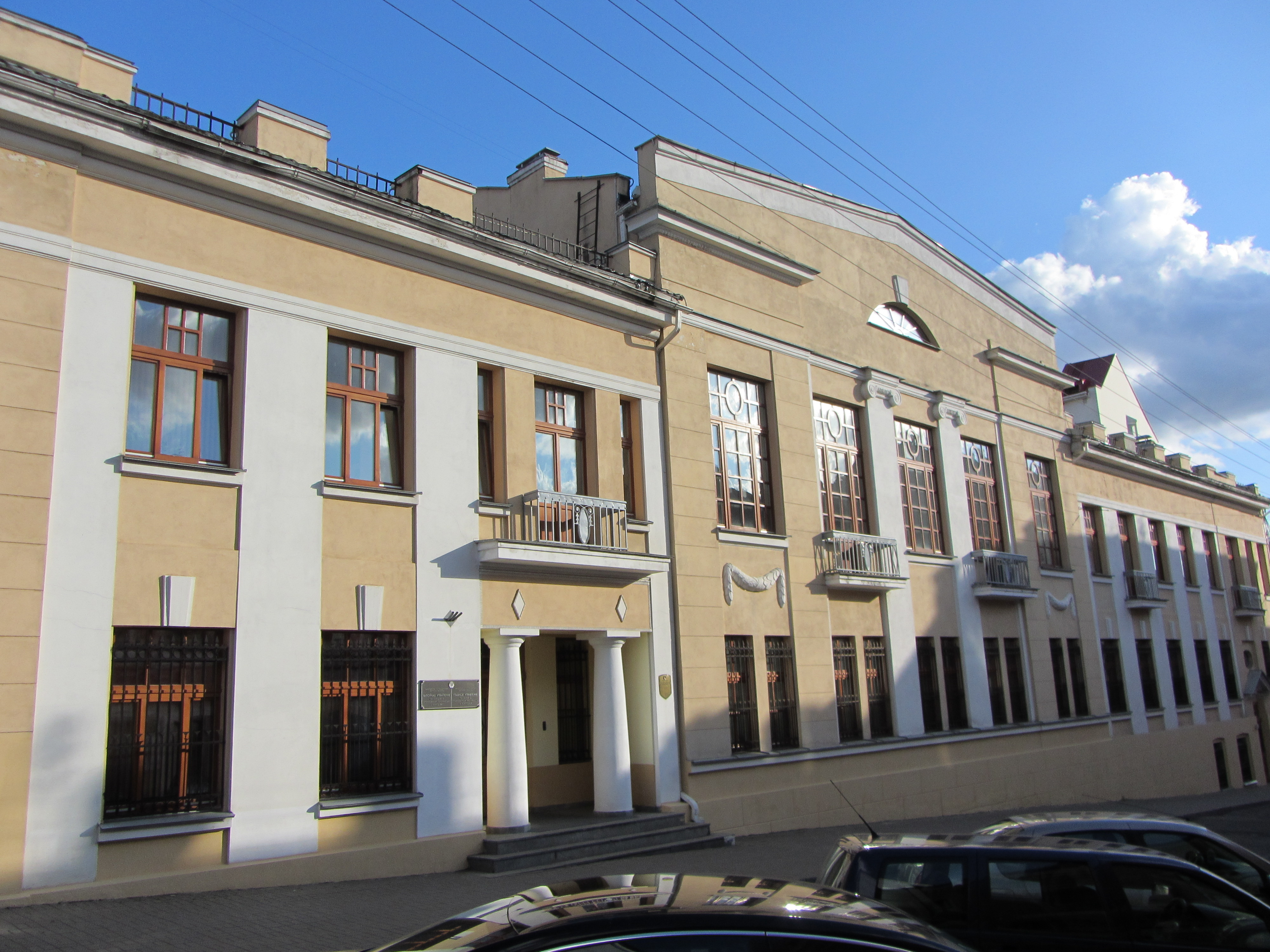
- Headquarters

Special service overview
- Formed: 1 May 1992
- Type: law enforcement
- Jurisdiction: Belarus
- Headquarters: Minsk, Belarus
- Special service executives: Andrey Ananienka, Chief; Dzmitry Kovach, 1st deputy; Dzianis Chamadanau, Deputy; Mikhail Biedunkievich, Deputy
- Parent department: Ministry of Internal Affairs

The Main Directorate for Combating Organized Crime and Corruption (Note: Russian: Главное управление по борьбе с организованной преступностью и коррупцией МВД Республики Беларусь, romanized: Glavnoye upravleniye po borʹbe s organizovannoy prestupnostʹyu i korruptsiyey, abbreviated ГУБОПиК (GUBOPiK), Belarusian: Галоўнае ўпраўленне па барацьбе з арганізаванай злачыннасцю і карупцыяй, romanized: Haloŭnaje ŭpraŭliennie pa baraćbie z arhanizavanaj zlačynnasciu i karupcyjaj, abbreviated ГУБАЗіК (HUBAZiK)) is a directorate of the Ministry of Internal Affairs of Belarus, founded in 1992.

It serves as one of the state security services of Belarus and has been accused of numerous acts of political repression, violence and torture of political opponents of Alexander Lukashenko's regime.

== History ==
HUBAZiK (GUBOPiK) has been referred by the media as "one of the main bodies responsible for political persecution" in Belarus". Historically, it was known for pressuring informal right-wing and left-wing groups and for cruel treatment of detained persons.

In 2020 and 2021, during the mass protests that followed a controversial presidential election, HUBAZiK (GUBOPiK), including its commander Mikalai Karpiankou personally, has been involved in harassment, persecution and torture of human rights activists as well as protesters against the regime of Alexander Lukashenko.

In 2020 and 2021, HUBAZiK (GUBOPiK) has been carrying out raids in the homes and offices of political activists, human rights activists, journalists.

On 7 September 2020, GUBOPiK has abducted the politician Maria Kalesnikava. On 9 September 2020, HUBAZiK (GUBOPiK) has reportedly raided the office of presidential candidate Viktar Babaryka.

In the second half of 2020, HUBAZiK (GUBOPiK) officer Stanislau Lupanosau sided with the opposition, passed on a large amount of inside information to the movement for free elections and left Belarus. In 2021, a criminal case against Luponosov was opened in Belarus; in April 2023, the Minsk City Court sentenced him in absentia to 18 years in a penal colony and a fine.

In May 2021, HUBAZiK (GUBOPiK) officially confirmed to the public the arrest of blogger Raman Pratasevich after a forced landing of Ryanair Flight 4978 in Minsk following a fake bomb threat.

On 1 June 2021, political prisoner Stsiapan Latypau attempted suicide in courtroom after stating that he had been intimidated by GUBOPiK.

HUBAZiK (GUBOPiK) has reportedly tortured and severely beaten the political prisoner Mikola Dziadok arrested in November 2020

In July 2021, the Belarusian Helsinki Committee, Viasna Human Rights Centre, Belarusian Association of Journalists and several other organisations called for an investigation into alleged torture of at least eight political prisoners by the GUBOPiK.

== International sanctions ==
In November 2020, Sviatlana Tsikhanouskaya, leader of the Belarusian democratic opposition and former presidential candidate, has proposed to the international community to officially designate HUBAZiK (GUBOPiK) as a terrorist organisation.

On 21 June 2021, GUBOPiK and its former commander Mikalai Karpiankou were added to Specially Designated Nationals and Blocked Persons List of the US Treasury for its role in the crackdown of the protests of 2020-2021:

The Main Directorate for Combating Organized Crime and Corruption of the MVD of the Republic of Belarus (GUBOPiK) continues to play a leading role in the post-election crackdown, including deploying specialized "Attack" units created to perpetrate violence against protesters. For instance, GUBOPiK was involved in a raid on an opposition presidential candidate’s office and the abduction of opposition figure Mariya Kalesnikava. Pratasevich was also in GUBOPiK custody following his arrest.

On the same day, Karpiankou was also sanctioned by the European Union, the United Kingdom, and Canada. On 7 July 2021, Switzerland also joined sanctions against him.

On 2 December 2021, Andrei Parshyn, head of HUBAZiK (GUBOPiK), and its other high-ranking officials were added to the Specially Designated Nationals and Blocked Persons List by the United States Department of the Treasury as well as to the Canadian sanctions list. On that same date, Parshyn was also targeted by financial sanctions of the United Kingdom. In June 2022, Parshyn was blacklisted by the European Union and Switzerland.

In the summer of 2024, the European Union and Switzerland imposed sanctions against the head of the HUBAZiK (GUBOPiK), Andrei Ananenko, and two of his deputies.

In January 2025, the United Kingdom joined the sanctions against the HUBAZiK (GUBOPiK) commanders Ananenko and Bedunkevich, and Canada joined the sanctions against HUBAZiK (GUBOPiK) and Ananenko.

== Commanders ==
- Mikalai Karpiankou (2014-2020)
- Andrei Ananenko (since 2022)
