= Svetlana Kalinkina =

Belarusian journalist (born 1970)

- Born: September 12, 1970 (age 55); Minsk, Byelorussian SSR
- Occupation: Journalist
- Awards: CPJ International Press Freedom Award (2004)

Svetlana Mikhailovna Kalinkina (Russian: Светлана Михайловна Калинкина; Belarusian: Святлана Міхайлоўна Калінкіна, romanized: Svyatlana Mikhaylowna Kalinkina; born 12 September 1970) is a Belarusian journalist known for her critical reporting of President Alexander Lukashenko.

== Editorship of Belorusskaya Delovaya Gazeta ==
In 2003, she was editor of Belorusskaya Delovaya Gazeta (BDG), a popular business daily based in Minsk. The paper began to publish reports and features critical of Lukashenko's government, including articles covering the trials of Vikto Kazeko, former director of the state food company, and Mikhail Leonov, former director of Minsk Tractor Works. One edition also included a poll asking readers whether it was appropriate for Lukashenko to use his presidential plane for personal journeys.

Soon the paper was reportedly subject to a campaign of official harassment, including "politically motivated tax inspections, death threats and detentions". Belarus's Information Ministry began to harass any printer that agreed to work with the paper, forcing BDG to print in Russia. The print edition of BDG had largely disappeared from Belarus by September 2004, leaving only the website.

Kalinkina then took a leave of absence from the paper to work against a national referendum that would eliminate presidential term limits, allowing Lukashenko to serve indefinitely. The referendum passed.

== Editorship of Narodnaya Volya ==
Kalinkina then accepted an editorship at the independent newspaper Narodnaya Volya (English "The People's Will"), Belarus's largest-circulation opposition daily. In October 2005, pressure from the Information Ministry prevented Belarusian printers from working with the paper, forcing Kalinkina again to contract with a printer in Smolensk, Russia. Beginning on 1 January 2006, the Belarusian post office refused to distribute the paper, and an entire print run of 30,000 copies was confiscated by police on 9 January. When citizens of Salihorsk began a petition on the paper's behalf, police made visits to the homes of the signatories to interrogate them.

On 13 March 2006, a week before the presidential election that would usher in Lukashenko's third term, Narodnaya Volya, BDG, and Tovarishch had their print runs abruptly cancelled by their Smolensk supplier. Kalinkina told The New York Times that she believed Belarusian government pressure to be responsible, saying, "When, a week before the election, someone refuses to print three papers, it is clear there are political reasons."

In April 2010, computers were seized from Kalinkina and fellow Narodnaya Volya reporter Marina Koktysh, as well as Charter 97 editor Natalya Radina and Novaya Gazeta journalist Irina Khalip as part of an investigation into a slander case filed by Ivan Korzh. The four were also brought to a police station for questioning. In September, Kalinkina wrote an article investigating the recent suspicious death of Charter 97 editor-in-chief Aleh Byabenin, and received several death threats shortly after, prompting the human rights organization Norwegian Helsinki Committee to issue an alert on her behalf.

On 29 April 2011, the Information Ministry again attempted to shut down Narodnaya Volya, filing a motion with the Supreme Economic Court of Belarus for the newspaper's closure.

After 11 years in Narodnaya Volya, Kalinkina resigned in 2016. According to her statement, she left on friendly terms with the editors office and will continue to collaborate with the newspaper as a journalist.

== Recognition ==
In 2004, the Committee to Protect Journalists awarded Kalinkina its International Press Freedom Award, "an annual recognition of courageous journalism". The award citation praised her "critical reporting on various government abuses" in the face of "years of legal and bureaucratic harassment from Belarusian authorities".

In 2015 Kalinkina received the award "For Personal Courage" from the Charter 97 organization.
