= Alexander Otroschenkov =

Belarusian pro-democracy activist and journalist

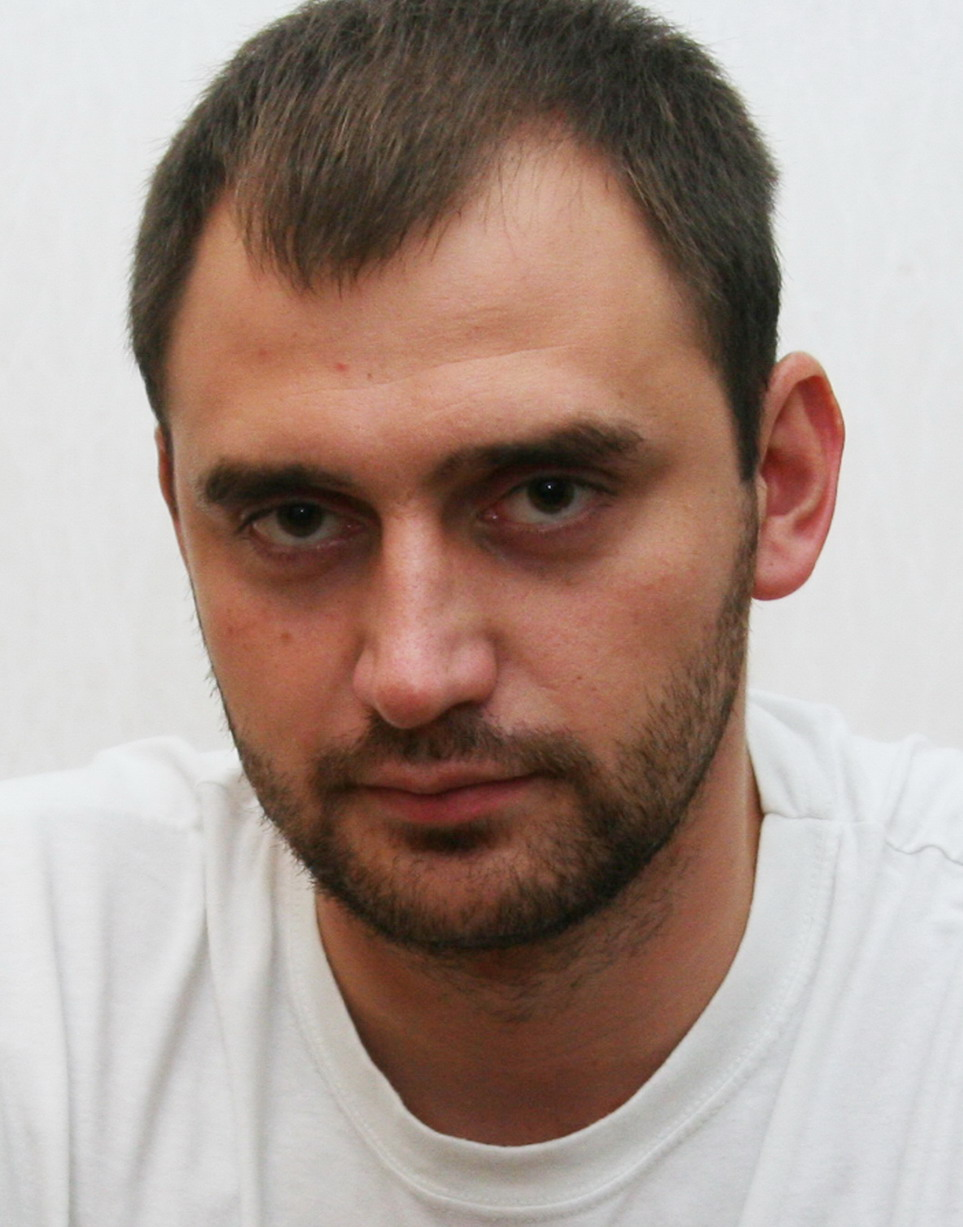

Alexander Otroschenkov (Аляксандр Атрошчанкаў, Александр Отрощенков, also transliterated as Alyaksandr Atroshchankau or Aleksandr Atroshchenko) is a Belarusian political activist and journalist. In 2011 he was sentenced to four years in prison after he covered a protest rally as a journalist. He was listed by Amnesty International as a prisoner of conscience.

== History of activism ==
He was a member of the Zubr movement of youth. In 2001 he was arrested after the police took a Zubr badge off his jacket at a soccer game. In the same year he was arrested and charged with Article 156 of the Belarusian penal code, "petty hooliganism", after the police confiscated Zubr flags from his friends and arrested 15 people.

He was the press secretary for the Zubr movement. He was one of many people charged with "slandering the president" (Article 367, par. 1 of the penal code) around the time of the 2001 Belarusian presidential election. The Center for Journalism in Extreme Situations said he felt his treatment was related to the invitation he had received from Amnesty International to travel to Germany. In mid-2002 he was jailed for 5 days for participating in the protests of 19 April in the same year.

He has worked as a journalist for Charter 97 for 10 years. He also was a spokesman for the group named European Belarus.

In 2012 Belarusian authorities prohibited Aliaksandr Atroshchankau to leave Belarus form calling to sanctions against regime of Aliaksandr Lukashenka

Since 2018 Aliaksandr Atroshchankau cooperates with Belarusian media Reform.by as an author of interviews with experts, diplomats and opinion-makers, also worked as a reporter ar NATO HQ

He is an expert in iSANS, an international expert initiative established in 2018 and aimed at detecting, analysing and countering hybrid threats against democracy, rule of law and sovereignty of states in Western, Central and Eastern Europe and Eurasia.

== Elections of 2010 and prison sentence ==
During the Belarus presidential election campaigns of 2010, he was the press secretary for candidate Andrei Sannikov. Sannkov's previous press secretary, Oleg Bebenin, had been found hanged; the government claimed it was suicide but his friends suspected otherwise.

On 19 December 2010, Atroshchankau was working as a journalist covering the mass protests of the election results. Many of these protests took place at Nezalezhanstsi Square in Minsk. He was working for Lithuanian Delfi, a news portal. He was one of several hundred people arrested on 19/20 December, and one of a few dozen eventually charged with offenses by the government. Amnesty International put him on a list of many Belarusian prisoners of conscience arrested during the protests. Daria Korsak, his wife, has stood picket outside of the KGB building in Minsk.

Atroshchankau was charged with violating part 2 of article 293 of the Belarus penal code (organizing and taking part in mass riot). The court also alleged that he was "part of the mob" and "forcefully tried to burst into the House of Government". According to Belsat TV he pleaded not guilty.

Aliaksandr Atroshchankau was subjected to tortures in KGB pretrial detention center for refusal to become KGB informant and testify against his colleges and himself.

The trial lasted from 1 March to 2 March. It was in the court for the Frunzenski district of Minsk. The judge was Cherkas Tatsiana Stanislavauna and the prosecutor was Tatsiana Maladtsova. Atroshchankau's trial was held at the same time as Aliaksandr Malchanau and Dzmitry Novik.

On 2 March, Atroshchankau was sentenced to four years in prison. The Human Rights Centre Viasna wrote that the sentence was "politically motivated and unlawful". It also claimed that the evidence against Atroshchankau and others did not show any violation of article 293.

At the time of his arrest he was a student of International Law (Международное право) at the European Humanities University. The university said that it would work to help him with his education despite the circumstances.

On 14 September 2011 Atroshchankau was released along with ten other political prisoners by a resolution of the president. According to Atroshchankau, he did not appeal for a release.

== See also ==
- 2010 Belarusian presidential election
- Andrei Sannikov
- Charter 97
