= Narodnaja Volya (newspaper) =

Belarusian independent opposition newspaper

- Type: Daily newspaper
- Format: broadsheet
- Founded: 1995
- Political alignment: opposition to Alexander Lukashenko
- Language: Belarusian, Russian
- Headquarters: 34a Engelsa str., Minsk, Belarus
- Circulation: 55,000
- Website: www.nv-online.info

Narodnaja Volya (Belarusian and Russian: Наро́дная во́ля; Belarusian pronunciation: [naˈrodnaja ˈvolʲa]; English: "The People's Will") is a Belarusian independent opposition newspaper founded by Iosif Siaredzich.

Since its launch, it was opposed to the Alexander Lukashenko regime and served as a tribune for critics of the government. For that reason, Narodnaja Volya was always harassed by authorities, survived several closures and numerous huge fines. The journalists received death threats, were arrested and questioned by the police and KGB.

Through the years such prominent persons as oppositionist Andrei Sannikov, journalists Ivan Makalovich, and Alyaksandr Feduta, writer Semen Bukchin, professor Vyacheslav Orgish, oppositionist Anatol Labiedzka, and future advisor to the President of Ukraine Mykhailo Podolyak were among Narodnaja Volya's authors.

== Establishment and early years ==
On March 17, 1995, Belarusian president Alexander Lukashenko fired Iosif Siaredzich from his post of the editor-in-chief at Narodnaja Gazeta. However, according to the state's law, only the Parliament could reappoint chief editors. After the dismissal, Siaredzich launched his independent newspaper and called it Narodnaja Volya.

The first issue of Narodnaja Volya was published on July 11, 1995. The publication had to use print shops in Vilnius, Lithuania, from December 1995 to early 1998. The pressure from the International community forced Belarusian authorities to allow printing within the country. By November 1997, its circulation was 55,000. The printing was moved to Minsk, Belarus in the private publishing house "Magic". It became the largest independent newspaper in Belarus. Siaredzich served as the editor-in-chief, and the deputy chief editor was Ivan Makalovich.

== 2000s ==
=== Lawsuits and fines ===
By 2001 Narodnaja Volya circulation reached 50,000. In August 2001 the authorities halted publication of the regular issue. On June 18, 2002, a Belarus district court froze Narodnaya Volya bank account because of defamation charges brought by two judges from Zhodzina. The judges sought 2,500,000 Belarusian rubles in damages.

On November 17, 2003, the Minsk City Court on 17 ordered Narodnaya Volya to pay Br 50,000,000 (approx. US$23,000) in damages for libel against Yahor Rybakou, the chairman of the Belarusian State Television and Radio Company (BDT). The Court also ordered Narodnaya Volya journalist Maryna Koktysh and former television host Eleanora Yazerskaya to pay Br 3,000,000 each to Rybakou. After an appeal, the fines for the journalists were reduced to Br 1,000,000, but the fine for the newspaper wasn't changed. On June 11, 2004, more than 400 people gathered on the October Square in Minsk to show their support to Narodnaya Volya.

In 2005 the court ordered the newspaper to pay Br 100,000,000 (approx. US$46,500) to head of the Liberal Democratiс Party Sergei Gaidukevich. Gaidukevich sued after an article on his alleged links to Saddam Hussein and receiving $1 mln from the Iraqis dictator.

In 2007 Leninsky District Court ordered Narodnaya Volya to pay a fine of Br 25,000,000 to the chief of the Main Ideological Administration of the President of Belarus Oleg Proleskovsky, reporter Marina Koktysh was personally fined Br 2,000,000.

Meanwhile, only in 2011 more than three times the newspaper claims were rejected by Belarusian courts.

=== Crackdown ===
In 2004 International Press Freedom Award laureate Svetlana Kalinkina accepted an editorial position at Narodnaja Volya. In 2004 Iosif Siaredzich wrote letters to Minsk court in protection of Leonid Svetik, a high school teacher and political activist, who was prosecuted by authorities for criticizing the government.

In 2005 the weekly circulation was around 150,000 copies. On September 20, 2005, without any notification, bailiffs entered the editors office and distrained all its property, Narodnaya Volya's bank account was arrested. The pressure from the Information Ministry prevented Belarusian printers from working with the paper. On October 1, 2005, Belsouzpechat and Krasnaya Zvezda printing house cancelled unilaterally the agreements with Narodnaja Volya. Almost 20 more publications were banned in the same way. Narodnaja Volya could no longer be distributed via newsstands or subscription. The editors office was forced to use the loophole in state law and print in Russian Smolensk. Border forces arrested three print runs and advised the editors office not to bring any more copies until the presidential election is over. OSCE representative said that the closure made the country lose two-thirds of its independent press, BAJ called it lawless. The Union of Right Forces Russian political party offered the newspaper to finance its work. Many years later Siaredzich recalled that the situation with printing and distribution was so desperate, that he even signed an agreement with some Lithuanian aeronautic company in to deliver Narodnaja Volya print runs across the state border from foreign print shops by aerostats. Meanwhile, in May 2007 at a press conference Lukashenko refused to acknowledge any oppression against authorities upon opposition and non-governmental media.

On October 19, 2005, Narodnaja Volya freelance journalist Vasiliy Grodnikov was found dead with a head wound. Retiree Grodnikov wrote articles on the most actual topics from Belarusian life.

Beginning on 1 January 2006, the Belarusian post office refused to distribute the paper, and an entire print run of 30,000 copies was confiscated by police on 9 January. When citizens of Salihorsk began a petition on the paper's behalf, police made visits to the homes of the signatories to interrogate them.

In March 2006 in Minsk several thousand copies of the newspaper were confiscated by the police. On 13 March 2006, a week before the presidential election that would usher in Lukashenko's third term, Narodnaja Volya, BDG, and Tovarishch had their print runs abruptly cancelled by their Smolensk supplier. Kalinkina told The New York Times that she believed Belarusian government pressure to be responsible, saying, "When, a week before the election, someone refuses to print three papers, it is clear there are political reasons." In the same week the publication was shut down.

Since November 2005 the runs dropped from 70 to 15 thousand. In Autumn 2006 the web site was launched. In December 2008 the newspaper was allowed to be sold through subscription and state newsstands. The circulation boosted from 9 to 19 thousand in a few days.

On December 11, 2009, a bomb threat call was made to the editors office, causing an evacuation of the staff. During the evacuation chief editor Svetlana Kalinkina's office had been broken into.

== 2010s ==
The presidential election 2010 in Belarus was scheduled on December, 19. The election period was marked with severe oppression of press and independent media. In April 2010, computers were seized from Kalinkina and Koktysh, as well as Charter 97 editor Natalya Radina and Novaya Gazeta journalist Irina Khalip as part of an investigation into a slander case filed by Ivan Korzh. The four were also brought to a police station for questioning. In September, Kalinkina wrote an article investigating the recent suspicious death of Charter 97 editor-in-chief Aleh Byabenin, and received several death threats shortly after, prompting the human rights organization Norwegian Helsinki Committee to issue an alert on her behalf.

=== Harassment of press and journalists ===
In 2010 the newspaper received four official warnings from the government.

On April 7, 2010, the picket of veterans took place in front of the editors office. The veterans, supported by unknown sportive-looking young men, protested against the publication of chapters from Ilya Kopil's book on the Second World War, accusing it for propaganda of fascism and falsification of history. The book described how some German soldiers showed mercy to the Belarusian civilians during the war, while some of Belarusian partisans were former hardened criminals and kept the local villagers in fear. Svetlana Kalinkina met with the protesters and offered them to publish their opinions in the next issue of Narodnaya Volya. Government-owned TV channels covered the picket as 'people outrage against detractors from the opposition'. The second picket took place on 14 April, initiated by Minsk State Youth Union. Kalinkina came to the protesters again and explained the value of uncensored war memoirs and its historical significance.

On February 17, 2011, deputy editor Marina Koktysh was questioned by the police, the editors office was searched. On February 26, Kalinkina's apartment was searched by the police, her computer was seized. The attention from authorities was allegedly linked to the recent investigation of high ranking KGB officials, published by Narodnaja Volya. Kalinkina and Natalya Radina had their calls and e-mails tapped by law enforcement, they received numerous kill threats.

On 29 April 2011, the Information Ministry again attempted to shut down Narodnaja Volya and another independent newspaper Nasha Niva, filing a motion with the Supreme Economic Court of Belarus for the newspaper's closure. On May 13, 2011, the preliminary court hearing took place of the Narodnaja Volya case. The official reason to close the newspaper was the distribution of unsound information. On May 12 the similar hearings were held of the case against Nasha Niva. The actual reasons were the reports on anti-government demonstrations after the presidential elections. Due to high international resonance, the Ministry dropped the case but immediately started the new ones on administrative offences. These cases ended with fines of Br 14,000,000. At a press conference in June 2011, Lukashenko said that "they [Narodnaya Volya and Nasha Niva] had it coming".

In 2008 Marina Koktysh was refused journalist accreditation to the House of Representatives of the Belarusian parliament. She unsuccessfully sued the government several times. Only in 2014, the UN Human Rights Committee asserted Koktysh's rights.

Through the years, she was forcibly removed from a train from Vilnius by Belarusian border control, had her car and computers arrested, phone calls surveilled, called to question in KGB and the General Prosecutors Office. In October 2011 Koktysh suffered from a phone attack - the constant calls from unknown numbers dropped as soon as she answered, so the journalist couldn't work or contact her friends or family. At a press conference on December 23, 2011, Koktysh asked Lukashenko if he would sleep better if the accused of treason oppositionist Andrei Sannikov and Mikola Statkevich pleaded for absolution. Belarusian president avoided an answer with a sarcastic comment that one should sleep with him to know the quality of his sleep.

In 2015 at a press conference Lukashenko said to Siaredzich that he knows nothing about any oppression against the newspaper and he would not prosecute it for publishing the opposition views.

=== Temporary liberalization ===
On April 1, 2016, Svetlana Kalinkina resigned from her post of editorial director. According to the mutual agreement with the editor's office, she kept cooperating with Narodnaja Volya as a journalist. In July of the same year the paper started using bigger fonts to improve readability for the sake of senior readers. On the New Year's Eve 2017 Nobel laureate Svetlana Alexievich sponsored a 6-month subscription on Narodnaja Volya to 108 regional libraries in Belarus.

In 2017 Iosif Siaredzich was invited for a private meeting with Alexander Lukashenko, where the president reassured that no oppression on independent and opposition press would be done. Lukashenko said that his blood boiled when he read 'false news and reports' in Narodnaja Volya, but still, he promised to return 8 publications in state subscription catalogues.

In December 2018 the newspaper launched a crowdfunding campaign to subscribe all rural, district and regional libraries to Narodnaja Volya. The initiative aimed to give access to the publication to people with low income, who couldn't afford to buy the newspaper.

=== Further pressure ===
On August 25, 2020, the Belarusian Press House refused to print the latest issue of Narodnaja Volya, as if due to a breakdown of the printing press. Within the same timeframe and for the same reason, three issues of Komsomolskaya Pravda in Belarus and one for BelGazeta and Svobodnye Novosti Plus each were not published – all four newspapers covered the 2020–21 Belarusian protests.

In August 2021 Siaredzich was refused accreditation to the annual 'Big Talk' press-conference with Alexander Lukashenko.

== Awards ==
- Marina Koktysh won Gerd Bucerius Press Prize (2010);
- Marina Koktysh won the Love Belarus award in Journalism (2012);
- Winner of BAJ Free Word Competition (2012);
- Iosif Siaredzich received honorary diploma from BAJ for 'Many years of outstanding work for freedom of speech and professional journalism' (2019);

== Sources ==
- Fedotova, N.; Kulinka, N. (2014). Время несбывшихся надежд [The Time of Unfulfilled Hopes]. Minsk. ISBN 978-609-8147-10-0.
- "Monopolizing the Media and Information Flows". Human Rights Watch.
- "Response to Representative on Freedom of the Media, Miklos Haraszti" (PDF). United States Mission to the OSCE. 2010-03-04.
- Pina, Frederica (2003-10-19). Pressure, Politics and the Press: the State of Media Freedom in Belarus, Moldova and Ukraine (PDF). Article 19 European Programme. p. 158. ISBN 1-902-598-61-X.
- Индивид v. государство: практика обращения в договорные органы ООН применительно к Республике Беларусь [Person vs. State: Practice of Appealing to UN Treaty Bodies in Belarus] (PDF) (in Russian). Vol. 2. Vilnius: Boris Zwozski Belarusian Human Rights House. 2013. p. 698. ISBN 978-609-95300-2-4.
- Reva, E. K.; Kazeeva, K. S. (2014). ""Образ России как информационный конструкт в постсоветском пространстве (на материалах газеты "Народная воля")" [Image of Russia as an Informational Construct in Post USSR Space (Based on 'Narodnaja Volya' newspaper)]. Penza State University Journal (in Russian). 2 (6): 19–24.
- "Media in Belarus, 2011" (PDF). Minsk: BAJ. 2012. Archived from the original (PDF) on 2020-11-27.
