= Belorusskaya Delovaya Gazeta =

Russian-language newspaper in Minsk, Belarus

- Type: Daily newspaper
- Founder: Piotr Martsau
- Editor: Svetlana Kalinkina (2003-04)
- Founded: 1992
- Language: Russian
- Headquarters: Minsk, Belarus
- Circulation: 70,000 per week
- Website: https://bdg.news

Belorusskaya Delovaya Gazeta (Russian: Белорусская деловая газета, BDG; English: "Belarusian Business Newspaper", Belarusian: Беларуская дзелавая газета) was a business-oriented bi-weekly Russian-language newspaper based in Minsk, Belarus.

Closed by the state authorities, the print version of the newspaper ceased to exist in 2006. The publication continues to operate as a website.

== History ==
The newspaper was founded by Piotr Martsau in 1992.

In 2003, its editor was Svetlana Kalinkina. The paper began to publish reports and features critical of Lukashenko's government, including a series on the trial of Viktor Kazeko, former director of the state food company, a story on the corruption trial of former Minsk Tractor Works director Mikhail Leonov, and a poll asking readers whether Lukashenko should be allowed to have his presidential plane for personal use. Reporter Iryna Khalip's articles on official corruption led to a brief suspension of the newspaper's printing rights for "insulting the honor and dignity of the president".

Soon the paper was reportedly subject to a campaign of official harassment, including "politically motivated tax inspections, death threats and detentions". On 28 May, 2003, the publication was suspended for three month by the Ministry of Information, following legal action for defaming Lukashenko. Later, Belarus's Information Ministry began to harass any printer that agreed to work with the paper, forcing BDG to print in Smolensk, Russia. In January 2004, Belpochta and Belsayuzdruk state distributors cancelled their contracts with the newspaper. The print edition of BDG had largely disappeared from Belarus by September 2004, leaving only the website.

Kalinkina then took a leave of absence from the paper to work against a national referendum that would eliminate presidential term limits, allowing Lukashenko to serve indefinitely. The referendum passed, and Kalinkina took a new position at Narodnaya Volya.

In 2004, the Committee to Protect Journalists awarded Kalinkina its International Press Freedom Award, "an annual recognition of courageous journalism", for her work with BDG. The award citation praised her "critical reporting on various government abuses" in the face of "years of legal and bureaucratic harassment from Belarusian authorities".

== Print run cancellation ==
On 13 March 2006, a week before the presidential election that would usher in Lukashenko's third term, BDG, Narodnaya Volya, and Tovarishch had their print runs abruptly cancelled by their Smolensk supplier. Kalinkina told The New York Times that she believed Belarusian government pressure to be responsible, saying, "When, a week before the election, someone refuses to print three papers, it is clear there are political reasons."

Shortly after, increasing financial pressures forced the closure of paper BDG.

== Website ==
In 2016, at a press conference in Minsk president Lukashenko received a question from BDG journalist and was surprised to learn that the newspaper still worked online. Headed by Alena Nestsiarovich, the online version of BDG turned into an informational and analytical resource with a focus on quality analytical longreads.
