= 2010 Belarusian presidential election =

- 19 December 2010
- Registered: 7,105,660
- Turnout: 90.65% (▼2.29 pp)
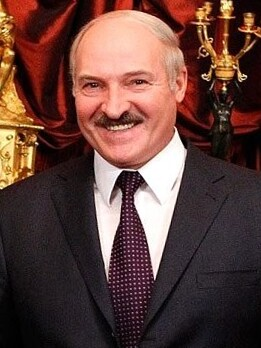

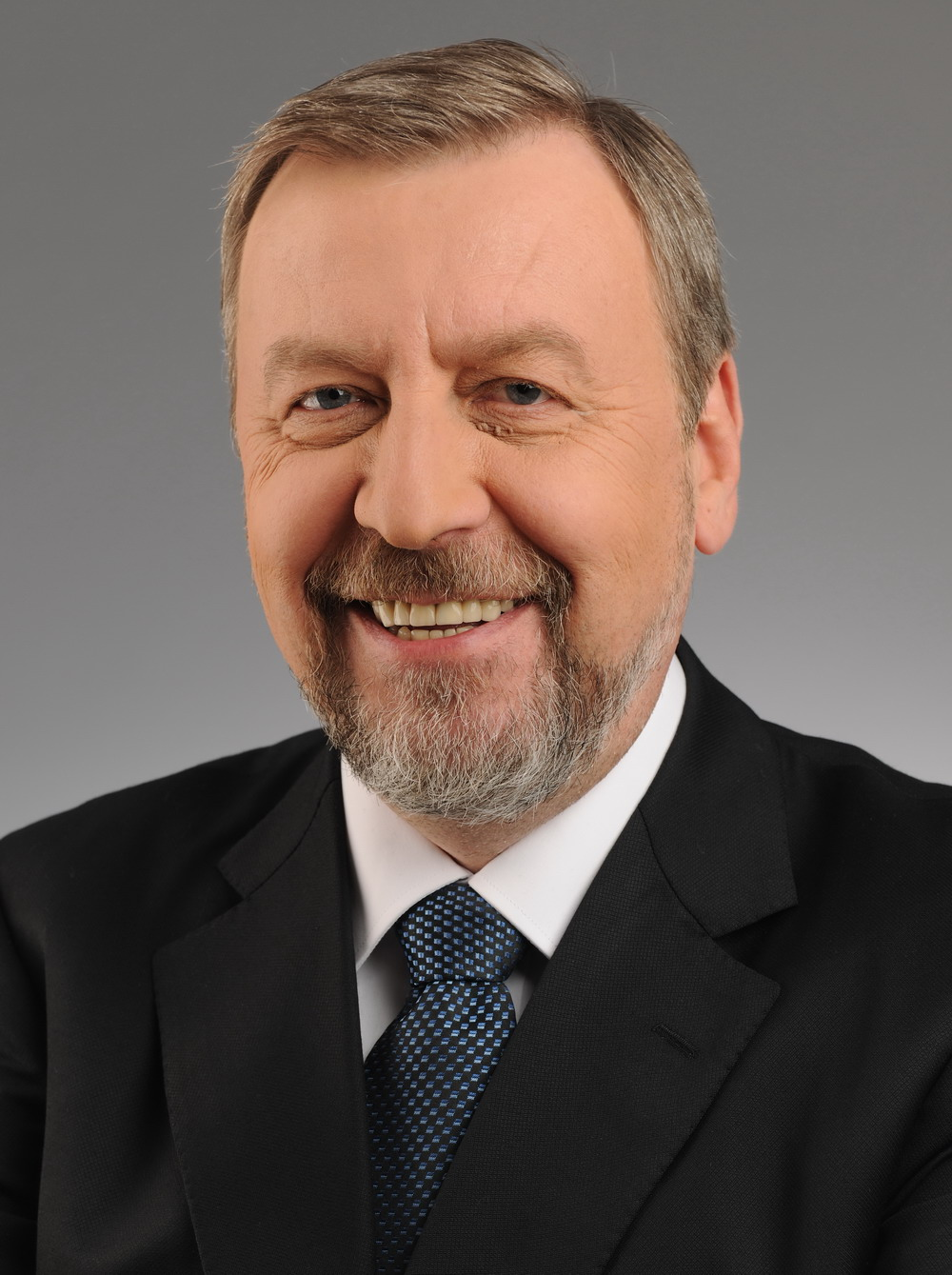
| Nominee | Alexander Lukashenko | Andrei Sannikov |
| Party | Independent | Independent |
| Popular vote | 5,130,557 | 156,419 |
| Percentage | 80.44% | 2.45% |
- Results by region Lukashenko: 65–70% 80–85%
President before election
Alexander Lukashenko
Independent
Elected President
Alexander Lukashenko
Independent

The Belarusian presidential elections were held on 19 December 2010 and were condemned by international observers. Incumbent President Alexander Lukashenko secured his fourth term, defeating nine opposition candidates.

President Lukashenko had been in office since 1994, consolidating his power and abolishing presidential term limits in a 2004 referendum. The United States and the European Union criticized him for a poor human rights record and authoritarian rule, especially noting the violent suppression of mass protests after his prior re-election in 2006. Relations between Belarus and Russia had deteriorated following the 2007 winter gas dispute, the 2008 Russo-Georgian War, and subsequent conflicts over the recognition of Abkhazia and South Ossetia. This provided Alexander Lukashenko with an opportunity to normalize relations with the West. The further rapprochement depended on the election being recognized as free and fair by Western observers, which led Lukashenko to partially liberalize the electoral process.

Of the ten candidates, incumbent President Alexander Lukashenko was declared the winner by the Central Election Commission with over 80% of the vote. After an opposition protest against electoral fraud was violently suppressed by riot police the night after the elections, hundreds of protesters and seven presidential candidates were arrested by the Belarusian KGB, including runner-up Andrei Sannikov.

Western countries decried the election as a farce and an egregious affront to democracy and human rights. The United States and the European Union called for the release of all imprisoned candidates. By contrast, countries such as Syria, China, Vietnam, and Russia congratulated the re-elected incumbent.

== Background ==
Lukashenko was elected as the first President of Belarus in 1994. In 1996, he held a referendum to adopt changes to the Constitution that consolidated his power. In 2004, he conducted another to abolish term limits. His rule has been described as authoritarian, and no elections since 1994 have been deemed free and fair by Western observers. The 2006 elections led to mass protests, labeled the "Jeans Revolution", as well as condemnation of Lukashenko's government and the introduction of sanctions by the USA and the EU.

Russia and Belarus formed the Union State in 1999, but initial enthusiasm for deeper integration stalled as early as 2003. Soon after the 2006 elections, Russia initiated an effort to obtain a share of Beltransgaz, the Belarusian gas monopoly. This led to Lukashenko considering an energy alliance with neighboring, pro-Western Ukraine. The conflict culminated in the 2006-2007 winter gas dispute, which led to a three-day cutoff of oil flow via the Druzhba pipeline. This experience led Lukashenko to declare his Russia-oriented foreign policy a mistake. Russia threatened to cut gas flow again in June 2007, and Lukashenko responded by saying he wouldn't kneel to the Kremlin.

During the Russo-Georgian War of 2008 Belarus didn't recognize the independence of South Ossetia and Abkhazia, the Russian ambassador in Belarus criticized Minsk for insufficient support of Russia. Shortly after Lukashenko released the last political prisoners, in October travel sanctions by the EU against most Belarusian officials were suspended and Belarus started negotiations on loan from the IMF to deal with the 2008 financial crisis. Shortly after Lukashenko eased censorship and allowed printing of the two oppositions newspapers, Nasha Niva and Narodnaya Volya.

In May 2009, Belarus took part in the EU's Eastern Partnership summit. In June, Russia engaged in a short-term trade dispute with Belarus, banning the import of dairy products. In April 2010, the ousted President of Kyrgyzstan Kurmanbek Bakiyev found refuge in Belarus, for which Russian president Dmitry Medvedev sharply criticized his Belarusian counterpart. In June 2010, the two countries had another energy dispute, which led to a temporarily lower amount of oil shipped via Belarus and a delay in the signing of the Customs Union between Russia, Belarus, and Kazakhstan.

In domestic politics, Lukashenko limited coverage of Russian TV. Following recommendations from the OSCE, he liberalized election laws, making meetings and funding easier and allowing candidates to debate each other on TV. Western countries, on their part, limited funding of pro-democracy NGOs and promised further financial assistance in case the 2010 elections were free and fair according to Western monitors.

== Electoral system ==
Presidential elections in Belarus were conducted via two-round system. Candidates were required to get 50% of all ballots cast to win in the first round, otherwise the second round should be held. For an election to be valid, over 50% of registered voters must participate.

To be eligible for President one must be Belarusian-born citizen at least 35 years old and resided in the country at least 10 years prior to the election.

The election date was set by the lower house of parliament. It had to be scheduled no later than five months and conducted no later than two months before the end of the President's current term.

The 2010 election followed this timeline:

| 14 September 2010 | The House of Representatives officially announced the election date |
| 27 September 2010 | Registration of initiative groups by the CEC |
| 18 November 2010 | Registration of candidates by the CEC |
| 19 December 2010 | Election Day |
| 24 December 2010 | The CEC declared Alexander Lukashenko as the elected President |
| 21 January 2011 | Inauguration Day |

== Candidates ==
=== Death of Aleh Byabenin ===
In the first week of September 2010, candidate Andrei Sannikov's campaign press secretary Aleh Byabenin was found hanged. Biabienin had been a key member of Sannikov's campaign, and was also director and co-founder of Charter97 – an opposition group and website and one of the few outlets for information on opposition candidates during the election. The official investigation ruled the death as suicide, but Sannikov expressed suspicion; saying that Biabienin had been in good mental health, there was no suicide note, and there were unexplained injuries on the body.

=== Lukashenko ===
President Lukashenko (who had been serving his third term), when addressing the press in February 2007, stated that his health permitting, he would run in 2011. According to the result of a referendum in 2004, Lukashenko was declared the first President of Belarus and therefore had no term limits. On 4 May 2010, in an interview with Reuters, he stated: "I have not yet decided whether I will run [...] There are no factors now that would force me to refuse to participate".

=== Official registration information ===
| Name | Occupation, party | Number of people in initiative group | Number of signatures accepted |
|---|---|---|---|
| Ryhor Kastusiou | Deputy Chairman of the Belarusian People's Front | 1,306 | 100,870 |
| Alexander Lukashenko | president | 8,403 | 1,110,149 |
| Ales Michalevic | lawyer, leader of the Modernization Union | 1,795 | 111,399 |
| Uladzimir Nyaklyayew | poet, leader of the "Tell the Truth!" movement (Руху "Гавары праўду!") | 3,271 | 180,073 |
| Jaroslav Romanchuk | economist, deputy chairman of the United Civil Party of Belarus | 1,461 | 123,206 |
| Vital Rymasheuski | co-chairman of the Belarusian Christian Democracy party | 1,698 | 102,817 |
| Andrei Sannikov | leader of the "For a European Belarus" movement (Руху "За Еўрапейскую Беларусь"), former Deputy Foreign Minister of Belarus | 2,001 | 142,023 |
| Mikola Statkevich | chairman of the Belarusian Social Democratic Party | 1,545 | 111,159 |
| Viktar Ciareschanka | economist | 1,301 | 109,012 |
| Dzmitry Wus | lawyer and businessman | 1,355 | 104,102 |
| Uładzimier Pravalski | businessman | 186 | 118 |
| Piatro Barysaŭ | pensioner | 110 | Supported Rymašeŭski |
| Sergei Gaidukevich | Liberal Democratic Party | 10,443 | Withdrew his candidacy |
| Jury Hłušakoŭ | Belarusian Green Party | 243 | Withdrew his candidacy |
| Siarhiej Ivanoŭ | unemployed | 129 | Withdrew his candidacy |
| Ivan Kulikoŭ | scientist | 107 | Withdrew his candidacy |
| Siarhiej Ryžoŭ | manager | 123 | Withdrew his candidacy |

Alaksandar Milinkievic, of the "For Freedom" movement (Руху "За Свабоду"), initially announced his bid, but canceled it in September.

The CEC issued a warning to Uladzimir Nyaklyayew's "Say the Truth!" movement for violating the Electoral Legislation when his organisation gathered signatures of ineligible constituents for "subscription lists."

There were rumors that only three candidates besides Lukashenko managed to gather the 100,000 required signatures.

== Campaign ==
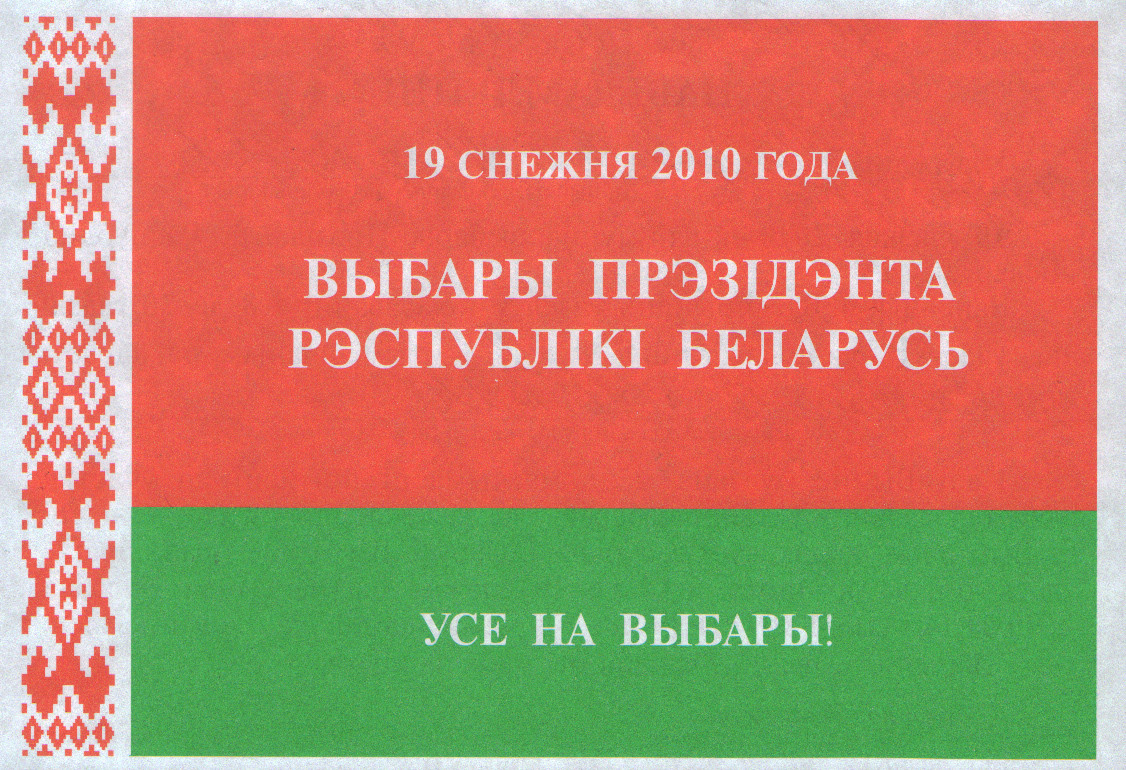
Official government-printed "invitation to participate" in the 2010 presidential election.

=== Conduct ===
Campaigning officially began on 19 November. Candidates held one-to-one meetings across the country and could use Belarusian state media for their TV and radio broadcasts They could also participate in a live media debate, which occurred for the first time since 1994. However, contrary to the Electoral Code, these debates were not aired during primetime. The media environment remained biased in favor of Lukashenko; he received 90% of coverage both on state TV and in state newspapers.

Changes in the law allowed candidates to establish their individual campaign funds and use their own money or supporters' contributions to fill them. Lukashenko received €30,500 this way, Nyaklyayew €25,000, and Sannikov €4,200. Additionally, all candidates were given €19,500 for print campaign materials.

During the election, there was no need to obtain permission for mass events; only notifying authorities was required. Lukashenko conducted 57 mass events, Nyaklyayew 40, and Sannikov 23, while other candidates held no more than a dozen.

On 15 December 2010, Andrei Sannikov filed two legal complaint applications with the Central Election Commission, demanding the withdrawal of Alexander Lukashenko's registration for electoral violations and the removal of Lidia Yermoshina, the chairwoman of the CEC, for conflict of interest. Both complaints were denied.

=== Russia ===
The run-up to the campaign was marked by a series of Russian media attacks upon the incumbent Alexander Lukashenko. NTV television broadcast throughout July a multi-part documentary entitled 'The Godfather' highlighting the suspicious disappearance of opposition leaders Yury Zacharanka and Viktar Hanchar, businessman Anatol Krasoŭski and journalist Dzmitry Zavadski during the late 1990s, as well as highlighting a statement Lukashenko had made seemingly praising Adolf Hitler.

Lukashenko referred to the media attack as "dirty propaganda". He also accused Russia of funding his opposition, to which Dmitry Medvedev responded by saying that Lukashenko lacked basic human decency. Broadcasts of Russian media critical of the Belarusian President were censored.

== Opinion polls ==
Prior to the election, Belarusian pollster IISEPS regularly asked citizens to indicate their preferred candidate if elections were held tomorrow.

Electoral rating of Lukashenko (open question)
| Apr 2006 | Sep 2006 | Dec 2007 | Mar 2008 | Jun 2008 | Sep 2008 | Dec 2008 | Mar 2009 | Oct 2010 | Dec 2010 |
|---|---|---|---|---|---|---|---|---|---|
| 60.3% | 44.9% | 39.9% | 42.5% | 38.9% | 42.5% | 40.2% | 39.2% | 44.0% | 53.0% |

Polls typically include those who do not vote, meaning a candidate's stated share of votes will be lower than what would be observed in an actual election. For instance, 51.1% in a December poll translates to 58.0% at the ballot. The Central Election Commission said that all nine opposition figures were likely to get less than half the vote total incumbent Lukashenko would get. Nine organizations were allowed to conduct opinion polls about the elections, among them SOCIUM and TNS-Ukraine, but not IISEPS.

| Pollster | Date | Lukashenko | Nyaklyayew | Sannikov | Romanchuk | Statkevich |
|---|---|---|---|---|---|---|
| IISEPS (Note: Who did you vote for in the presidential elections on December 19?) | 2-12 June 2011 | 37.0% | 29.5% | | | |
| IISEPS | 2-12 March 2011 | 46.6% | 9.6% | 6.3% | | |
| IISEPS | 21-31 December 2010 | 51.1% | 8.3% | 6.1% | 3.2% | 1.7% |
| EcooM (Note: Has ties to the government) | Exit poll | 79.1% | 2.4% | 2.6% | 3.1% | 0.8% |
| INSIDE (Russia) | Exit poll | 38.1% | 11.7% | 11.6% | 9.9% | 3.8% |
| SOCIUM | Exit poll | 40.2% | 19.8% | 11.5% | 5.8% | 7.2% |
| TNS-Ukraine | Exit poll | 42.2% | 17.7% | 13.2% | 4.2% | 8.9% |
| Official results | 19 December 2010 | 80.4% | 1.8% | 2.5% | 2.0% | 1.1% |
| SOCIUM | 1-10 December 2010 | 35.2% | 18.4% | 9.9% | 6.2% | 5.1% |
| SOCIUM | 11-22 October 2010 | 31.4% | 11.2% | 9.8% | 6.0% | 3.1% |
| IISEPS (Note: Respondents were asked whether they were willing to vote for a candidate, with the option to choose more than one.) | 14-24 October 2010 | 48.2% | 16.8% | 8.6% | 6.1% | 5.8% |
| IISEPS | 2-12 September 2010 | 43.6% | 5.1% | 3.0% | 2.6% | 2.8% |
| IISEPS | 2-12 June 2010 | 48.3% | 1.6% | 0.5% | 1.0% | 0.8% |

According to a December 2010 IISEPS poll, 57.5% believed that Lukashenka had won in the first round while 23.5% disagreed. The poll also asked about a potential second round, finding that 57.1% would have voted for Lukashenko and 23.9% for Nyaklyayew.

June 2011 poll from IISEPS also provided detailed voter demographics

Voter demographics
| Demographic subgroup | Lukashenko | Other candidate | % of total vote |
|---|---|---|---|
| Total vote | 55.6% | 44.4% | 100% |
Gender
| Men | 42.1% | 57.9% | 45.4% |
| Women | 66.3% | 33.7% | 54.6% |
Age
| 18–29 years old | 39.9% | 60.1% | 23.2% |
| 30–49 years old | 41.4% | 58.6% | 36.3% |
| 50 and older | 72.0% | 28.0% | 40.5% |
Educational attainment
| Less than general secondary | 89.4% | 10.6% | 13.4% |
| General secondary | 54.1% | 45.9% | 36.7% |
| Vocational or higher | 45.8% | 54.2% | 49.9% |
Employment
| Private | 27.1% | 72.9% | 23.4% |
| Public | 53.6% | 46.4% | 40.4% |
| Student | 39.2% | 60.8% | 6.1% |
| Retiree | 83.5% | 16.5% | 25.1% |
Region
| City of Minsk | 39.4% | 60.6% | 19.4% |
| Minsk | 36.3% | 63.7% | 15.1% |
| Brest | 62.8% | 37.2% | 14.4% |
| Grodno | 76.6% | 23.4% | 11.3% |
| Vitebsk | 53.2% | 46.8% | 13.3% |
| Mogilev | 67.1% | 32.9% | 11.7% |
| Gomel | 78.9% | 21.1% | 14.8% |
Area type
| >50,000 pop. | 53.3% | 46.7% | 56.4% |
| Rural | 58.5% | 41.5% | 43.6% |
How would you vote in a Belarus-Russia unification referendum today?
| For | 57.6% | 42.4% | 31.4% |
| Against | 47.0% | 53.0% | 47.8% |
| Would not participate | 79.0% | 21.0% | 12.9% |
How would you vote in a EU membership referendum today?
| For | 27.5% | 72.5% | 45.1% |
| Against | 77.0% | 23.0% | 32.4% |
| Would not participate | 81.0% | 19.0% | 14.9% |

After the election, Belarus experienced an economic crisis for which 61.2% blamed the President personally. This led to a collapse in his electoral rating, from 53% in December 2010 to 20.5% in September 2011.

== Election Day ==
The Central Election Commission of Belarus (CEC) said it was ready to cooperate with the OSCE's Office for Democratic Institutions and Human Rights in monitoring the election.

Though opposition figures alleged intimidation and "dirty tricks" were being played, Al Jazeera reported that the election was seen as comparatively open as a result of desire to improve relations with both Europe at-large and the United States.

The elections were observed by 36,096 domestic and 1,032 international observers, including 490 from the OSCE. The OSCE praised Lukashenko for improving the security of early voting; in the 2010 elections, 27.9% of eligible voters cast their ballots this way. On Election Day, observers positively assessed the voting process at 94% of observed polling stations.

However, less than one percent of electoral commission members were appointed by the opposition, and vote counting was assessed negatively in half of the cases. These shortcomings led to the conclusion that Belarus failed to meet its OSCE commitments regarding the election.

The Russia-led CIS delegation assessed the election as free and fair.

== Results ==
| Candidate | Party | Votes | % |
|---|---|---|---|
| Alexander Lukashenko | Independent | 5,130,557 | 80.44 |
| Andrei Sannikov | Independent | 156,419 | 2.45 |
| Jaroslav Romanchuk | United Civic Party | 127,281 | 2.00 |
| Ryhor Kastusiou | BPF Party | 126,999 | 1.99 |
| Uladzimir Nyaklyayew | Independent | 114,581 | 1.80 |
| Viktar Ciareščanka | Independent | 76,764 | 1.20 |
| Vital Rymasheuski | Belarusian Christian Democracy | 70,515 | 1.11 |
| Mikola Statkevich | Belarusian Social Democratic Party (Assembly) | 67,583 | 1.06 |
| Ales Michalevic | Independent | 65,748 | 1.03 |
| Dzmitry Wus | Independent | 25,117 | 0.39 |
| Against all | | 416,925 | 6.54 |
| Total | | 6,378,489 | 100.00 |
| Valid votes | | 6,378,489 | 99.03 |
| Invalid/blank votes | | 62,542 | 0.97 |
| Total votes | | 6,441,031 | 100.00 |
| Registered voters/turnout | | 7,105,660 | 90.65 |
Source: REC

=== Results by region ===
| Region | Lukashenko | Sannikov | Romanchuk | Kastusiou | Nyaklyayew | Ciareščanka | Rymasheuski | Statkevich | Michalevic | Wus |
|---|---|---|---|---|---|---|---|---|---|---|
| Brest | 82.22% | 2.77% | 1.89% | 1.45% | 1.59% | 1.08% | 1.37% | 1.03% | 1.25% | 0.49% |
| Vitebsk | 83.12% | 3.10% | 1.58% | 1.67% | 1.76% | 1.20% | 1.12% | 1.03% | 0.97% | 0.38% |
| Gomel | 82.86% | 0.99% | 0.92% | 2.96% | 0.91% | 0.73% | 0.77% | 0.69% | 0.73% | 0.27% |
| Grodno | 82.99% | 2.86% | 2.97% | 1.05% | 1.93% | 1.16% | 1.29% | 0.96% | 0.87% | 0.36% |
| Minsk | 81.52% | 1.53% | 1.69% | 1.60% | 1.23% | 1.18% | 0.91% | 0.94% | 1.04% | 0.34% |
| Mogilev | 85.65% | 2.71% | 1.50% | 0.94% | 1.91% | 1.13% | 0.93% | 0.95% | 0.79% | 0.24% |
| City of Minsk | 68.31% | 3.46% | 3.38% | 3.50% | 3.17% | 1.86% | 1.37% | 1.71% | 1.44% | 0.62% |
| Belarus | 80.44% | 2.45% | 2.00% | 1.99% | 1.80% | 1.20% | 1.11% | 1.06% | 1.03% | 0.39% |
Source: Central Election Commission

== Aftermath ==
=== Protests and crackdown ===
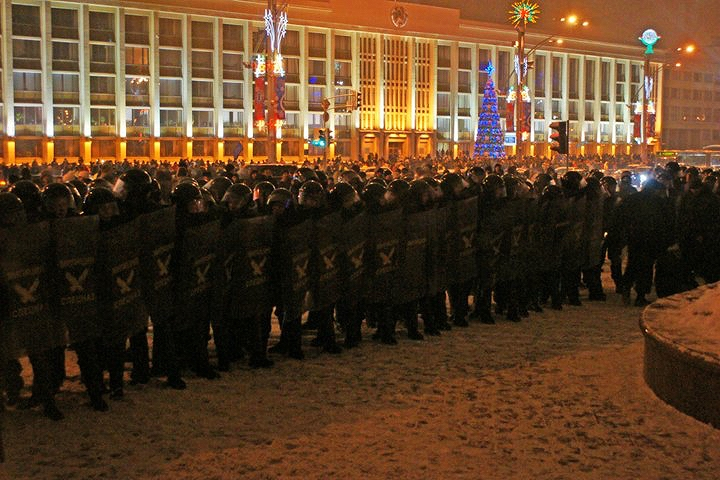
Special police forces surrounding protestors in Minsk

A large protest rally was organized the evening after the election at October Square in the center of downtown Minsk. This square had historically been the site of large protests, such as the violent suppression of the Jeans Revolution that took place after the disputed 2006 presidential election. However, riot police had cordoned off the square before the event, and people instead gathered at the nearby Liberty Square. While walking to the rally with about a hundred other people, presidential candidates Uladzimir Nyaklyayew and Mikola Statkevich were attacked by armed men dressed in black. Nyaklyayew was beaten to unconsciousness and hospitalized for head injuries. Statkievič later claimed they were attacked by Belarus special forces.

During the rally up to 30,000 people protested against Lukashenko, chanting, "Out!," "Long Live Belarus!" and other such slogans. A group of protesters tried to storm a principal government building, smashing windows and doors before riot police pushed them back. Candidate Vital Rymasheuski blamed "drunk provocateurs" for the violence. According to a protester, the demonstrators were largely peaceful and that it was a separate "group of people" who attacked the government building – suggesting also a provocation of force by Belarusian authorities. (Note: Protesters claimed they heard a police officer order someone to break windows in the government building, which they believe proves provocation.)

According to a protest participant (who is also director of the Belarus Free Theatre), thousands of demonstrators were beaten by riot police, and the square was left spattered with blood. She stated she was forced into a prison van and made to lie face down, while prison guards threatened her with murder and rape if she moved. Andrei Sannikov and his wife Iryna Khalip were among those attacked by police during the rally; and according to eyewitness statements gathered by Charter 97, Sannikov was singled out from the crowd by the OMON for a beating: "Andrei was beaten by truncheons while he was lying. He was beaten on the head [...] all over the body. Andrei was lying and trying to protect himself with his arms. No one was allowed to come near him, so that people could not defend Sannikov."

Lukashenko criticised the protesters, accusing them of "banditry" and saying that "the vandals and hooligans lost their human face. They simply turned into beasts. You saw how our law-enforcers behaved. They stood firm and acted exclusively within the bounds of the law. They defended the country and people from barbarism and ruin. There will be no revolution or criminality in Belarus." He also added that he could not imagine what more he could have done to make the election more democratic.

According to the Ministry of Internal Affairs, at least 85 police officers were admitted to the hospital for treatment.

=== Censorship, raids ===
Several websites of the opposition and opposition candidates were blocked or hacked. Facebook, Twitter, YouTube, Google Talk, many email services and LiveJournal were also blocked. The headquarters of Charter97 was stormed by the State Security Committee of the Republic of Belarus (known by the Russian acronym "KGB") and all its staff were arrested. Its editor-in-chief Natalla Radzina was briefly imprisoned on a charge of "organizing mass disorder". Radina was released in January 2011 on the condition that she leave Minsk; she fled to Moscow before receiving asylum in Lithuania, where she continues to manage Charter 97.

The offices of Polish-funded broadcasters Belsat TV and European Radio for Belarus had also been raided, while relatives of arrested prisoners were denied access to them.

=== Arrests ===
Up to 700 opposition activists, including 7 presidential candidates, were arrested in the post election crackdown. Furthermore, at least 25 journalists were arrested; a detained Russian press photographer went on hunger strike on December 21, 2010. According to a detainee, after being shipped to a detainment center after the protests, there were rows of men on every floor standing facing the walls with their hands behind their backs. Women were separated and moved to another floor. Guards made them spend the night standing with faces to the walls, and every detainee was forced to sign statements confessing to "taking part in an unsanctioned rally." 639 prisoners received immediate prison sentences of up to 15 days. 41 people were criminally charged. (Note: According to another source, 53 people were charged, among whom 34 were political activists.)

The presidential candidate Uladzimir Nyaklyayew, who had been seriously beaten during the evening of the election day, was taken from hospital by men in civilian clothing who wrapped him in a blanket on his hospital bed and carried him away as his wife screamed. While journalist Iryna Khalip and her husband Andrei Sannikov were on the way to a Minsk hospital to treat Sańnikaŭ's injured legs, their car was intercepted by authorities while Khalip was giving a mobile phone interview to the Moscow radio station Echo of Moscow. Khalip screamed on air that they were being forcibly removed from their car, arrested, and further beaten. Both Khalip and Sańnikaŭ were detained in a KGB facility in Minsk. Lukashenko later revealed that Khalip's phone was bugged. Ryhor Kastusiou and Dzmitry Wus were re-summoned for further questions by the KGB after being initially released. Kastusioŭ responded to the state crackdown saying "the regime has shown its true essence. We've been thrown 10 years into the past."

The State Security Committee of the Republic of Belarus (KGB) charged the activists, while domestic human rights groups stated they could face up to 15 years in jail. Twenty of the leading opposition figures were facing charges of "organising or participating in a public order disturbance" which is punishable by up to 15 years in jail.

=== By candidate ===
Candidates and their post-election fates

- Michalevic – arrested, tortured
- Nyaklyayew – attacked, arrested, sentenced to a two-year sentence, suspended for two years
- Romanchuk – intimidated
- Rymasheuski – sentenced to a two-year sentence, suspended for two years
- Sannikov – attacked, arrested, sentenced to 5 years
- Statkevich – attacked, arrested, sentenced to six years
- Wus – arrested, passport confiscated, sentenced to 5.5 years

I pray to God they all run away! Let them all run away. Nobody needs them there. Nobody needs them here either.

— Lukashenko, on Michalevič's flight to the Czech Republic

Lukashenko's chief election rivals were either intimidated (Jaroslav Romanchuk) or sentenced to prison terms just long enough to ensure they will be unable to participate in the 2015 elections (Andrei Sannikov, Mikola Statkevich and Dzmitry Wus). Opponent Uladzimir Nyaklyayew was sentenced to 2 years with sentence to begin in 2013.Candidate Ales Michalevic was released from detention on 15 February 2011; in a press conference on 1 March, he accused the KGB of torturing him and other former candidates while he was in custody.

On 17 February 2011 a Belarus court sentenced an opposition activist to four years in jail for taking part in the post-election protests. On 2 March Alexander Otroschenkov—a spokesman for candidate Sańnikaŭ, and who had been working as a journalist for Delfi during the December protests—was sentenced to 4 years in prison for violating "Article 293" of the penal code ("organizing and taking part in a mass riot"). Otroschenkov and many others are listed as prisoners of conscience by Amnesty International.

Andrei Sannikov was convicted of the charge of "organizing a mass protest" on 14 May 2011 and sentenced to five years in a high security prison.

== Reactions ==
The West generally denounced the election as fraudulent; the European Union renewed a travel ban effective 31 January 2011 – prohibiting Lukashenko and 156 of his associates from traveling to EU member countries – as a result of violent crackdowns of opposition supporters by Lukashenko's government forces following the election.

The United States said it would increase assistance to civil society by 30%, to $15 million; Germany, €6.6 million; Sweden, €7.0 million; the EU, $21.5 million; and Poland, $14 million, with total aid reaching $120 million.

The United States expanded its sanctions list on January 31 and again on August 11. The EU reintroduced travel restrictions, which had been suspended in 2008, on 31 January 2011, covering 157 people in total. The list was gradually expanded, reaching 243 individuals and 32 companies by 26 April 2012.

Lukashenko's inauguration ceremony of 22 January 2011 was boycotted by European Union ambassadors, while fellow CIS countries did not send officials higher than ambassadors. During this ceremony Lukashenko defended the legitimacy of his re-election and vowed that Belarus would never have its own version of the 2004 Ukrainian Orange Revolution and Georgia's 2003 Rose Revolution. In January, Lukashenko ordered the OSCE to leave.

Domestic

- Belarus – Lukashenko called the percentage of voters who voted for him "quite good". According to Lukashenko his opponents got few votes because "the ex-candidates had not committed any deeds to convince the Belarusian nation to vote for them. People learned their names two months before". He also stressed: “They may have a great future ahead of them but they have to work for it. If they do it, they will find their place in Belarus and will always enjoy support of the incumbent president”.

International organisations

- UN – The Secretary-General of the United Nations Ban Ki-moon noted the serious concerns voiced by observer groups regarding the electoral process and post-electoral developments and called on the government to observe fully human rights and due process. He also called on Belarusian president Aleksandr Lukashenko to release political prisoners arrested following the elections.
- CIS – The Commonwealth of Independent States recognised the election as legitimate.
- EU – The EU High Representative Catherine Ashton said in an official statement that "unfortunately, the trend set by the relative progress during the campaigning period was not followed by a transparent and fair polling process. It is especially regrettable that election night was marred by violence, which I strongly condemn. In particular, the beating and detention of several opposition leaders, including presidential candidates, is unacceptable." The president of the European Parliament Jerzy Buzek added that "beating independent election candidates is unacceptable. The action was outrageous"; he also launched a European Parliamentary investigation into the election.
  - A joint statement from the foreign ministers of the Czech Republic (Karel Schwarzenberg), Germany (Guido Westerwelle), Poland (Radosław Sikorski) and Sweden (Carl Bildt) on 23 December declared that "there can be no business-as-usual between the European Union and Belarus’ president, Aleksandr Lukashenko, after what has happened since the presidential election in Belarus[.] [...] continued positive engagement with Mr. Lukashenko at the moment seems to be a waste of time and money. He has made his choice — and it is a choice against everything the European Union stands for." They added that "while the voting proceeded in an orderly fashion, the counting of the votes turned into a charade. The report of the independent observers assessed the counting as 'bad' or 'very bad' in nearly half the polling stations they could observe, and it is not unreasonable to assume that it was even worse in the others. It became obvious that there were orders not to count votes, but to deliver a predetermined result. The combination of vote-rigging and outright repression makes what Milosevic tried to do in Serbia in 2000 pale in comparison. What we have seen brings back memories of the introduction of martial law in Poland in 1981."
- OSCE – The Organization for Security and Co-operation in Europe called the election "flawed" and that Belarus has a "considerable way to go in meeting its OSCE commitments." In response, Lukashenko said the OSCE had no right to speak about events in Belarus which happened after the election. He also called the OSCE criticism "amoral" because Belarus is an OSCE member and thus "experts and officials are subordinate to virtually 56 heads of state, including the Belarusian president."

Expressions of congratulations

- Azerbaijan – President Ilham Aliyev congratulated Lukashenko.
- China – President Hu Jintao congratulated Lukashenko.
- Georgia – President Mikheil Saakashvili congratulated Lukashenko on his victory.
- Kazakhstan – Nursultan Nazarbayev congratulated Lukashenko. The chairman of the Kazakh Senate, Kassym-Jomart Tokayev, also said that "the people of Belarus voted for the incumbent president, and this choice will enjoy the respect of Kazakhstan."
- Russia – Russian president Dmitry Medvedev commented on December 20 that the Belarusian election was an internal matter He officially congratulated Lukashenko on December 25. Russian electoral observers also said the election was legitimate.
  - Patriarch of Moscow Kirill I congratulated Lukashenko on his re-election.
- Syria – President Bashar al-Assad congratulated Lukashenko.
- Ukraine – President Viktor Yanukovych sent a letter of congratulations to Lukashenko. The Foreign Ministry stated that it would take into account the views of international observers in formulating its opinion about the election and expressed concern about the use of violence against opposition demonstrators. One Ukrainian member of the OSCE election observation mission, parliament deputy of the Party of Regions Oleksandr Stoyan, stated he saw no violations during the election and hoped that the Party of Regions would welcome the election result.
- Venezuela – President Hugo Chávez congratulated Lukashenko.
- Vietnam – President Nguyễn Minh Triết congratulated Lukashenko on his victory.

Expressions of concerns

- Poland – Foreign Minister Radosław Sikorski stated that a "reliable source" had informed him that the official results of the election had been falsified.
- Sweden – On the night of the election, the Swedish Minister for Foreign Affairs Carl Bildt reacted sharply about the news of a crackdown on the opposition rally in Minsk and said that the beating of Nyaklyayew "is very disturbing and totally unacceptable."
- United States – The United States did not recognise the result as legitimate and called for the immediate release of all opposition presidential candidates arrested by authorities.
  - In a joint statement on 24 December 2010, US Secretary of State Hillary Clinton and the EU's Catherine Ashton called for the immediate release of all 600 detained demonstrators as well as all presidential candidates. Both the EU and the US backed the OSCE's report asking Belarusian authorities to complete the reform of the electoral process it demanded. They said that without "considerable progress" in respect to democracy and human rights relations between Belarus and the EU and the US would not improve: "The Government of Belarus should take the steps necessary to create political space for political activists, civil society representatives, and independent journalists. The elections and their aftermath represent an unfortunate step backwards in the development of democratic governance and respect for human rights in Belarus. The people of Belarus deserve better."
  - On March 17, 2011, the United States Senate unanimously passed a resolution condemning the election as illegitimate and fraudulent; and calling on the Belarus regime to immediately release all political prisoners captured during the peaceful election protests.

== New government ==
On 28 December Lukashenko appointed Mikhail Myasnikovich as Prime Minister, replacing Sergei Sidorsky.
