= Zubr (political organization) =

Belarusian political youth organization

Zubr (Belarusian: ЗУБР) was a civic youth organization of the Belarusian opposition, formerly active in protests against President Alexander Lukashenko. The organization drew inspiration from Otpor! student movement (formerly of Yugoslavia) which contributed to the overthrow of Slobodan Milošević in 2000, and from Gene Sharp's writings on nonviolent action. Zubr was already prominent internationally in 2001 when its members were covered by The New York Times.

In 2005, US Secretary of State Condoleezza Rice, who was visiting Lithuania, met their leaders, who risked imprisonment upon their return. Some reporters have credited Zubr's leaders with the idea of a 'Denim Revolution', which, they hoped would attract popular support as Ukraine's Orange Revolution and Georgia's Rose Revolution. However, Lukashenko had said that "In our country, there will be no pink or orange, nor even a banana revolution".

Like many other opposition activists, Zubr members are often harassed and imprisoned by Belarus's police and KGB. On 23 December 2005, Zubr activists Pavel Modzharo (Павел Моджаро), Aleksandr Morozov (Александр Морозов) and another colleague were arrested on suspicion of possessing drugs, which, they insisted, plainclothes security officers had planted on them. On 16 February 2006, Zubr leaders Aleh Myatselitsa and Pavel Yukhnevich were among the detained after a police break-up of a peaceful protest calling for the release of political prisoners. Two other members were arrested on 20 February for handing out stickers the same day.

During the 2006 presidential election, Zubr had supported Alaksandar Milinkievič, the opposition United Democratic Forces of Belarus candidate. After international election monitors criticized the conduct of that election, there were several demonstrations at which protestors flew the Zubr flag next to the first post-independence Belarusian white-red-white tricolour and the EU flag.

== Polish Division of "Zubr" ==
After the elections in 2001, some of the activists went to emigration to Poland, where they met Polish supporters of the Belarusian opposition. Together, they made several actions of support and solidarity for Belarusian democrats:

- demonstrations near the Belarusian embassy in Warsaw on the anniversary of disappearances of Belarusian oppositionists, and so-called "Chain of Concerned People"
- spreading of informational leaflets for Poles about Human rights in Belarus
- cooperation with Polish youth organizations

The Polish Division of "Zubr" was virtually independent from the Belarusian one, but the chosen name had some disadvantages. For example, the Polish organization were trying to contact the organization in Belarus to consult common activity, and Belarusians living in Poland, working in organizations not friendly towards "Zubr", refused cooperation.

Because of this, the organization decided in November 2003 to rename the organization to "Union for Democracy in Belarus", a more neutral name.

== Aftermath ==
The movement faced infiltration by Belarusian KGB agents. Following the 2001 election, the US became disinclined to support it, but the Netherlands and Norway continued assistance. It was even alleged that the KGB developed its own department dedicated to writing NGO grant applications to secure funds.

Described by its own member as an 'old, exhausted animal' by the 2006 election, the Zubr organization self-dissolved in spring 2006.

== See also ==
- Colour revolution
- Alyaksandr Atroshchankau
