= 2011 Belarusian protests =

Protests against the government of Alexander Lukashenko

- Part of the Belarusian democracy movement
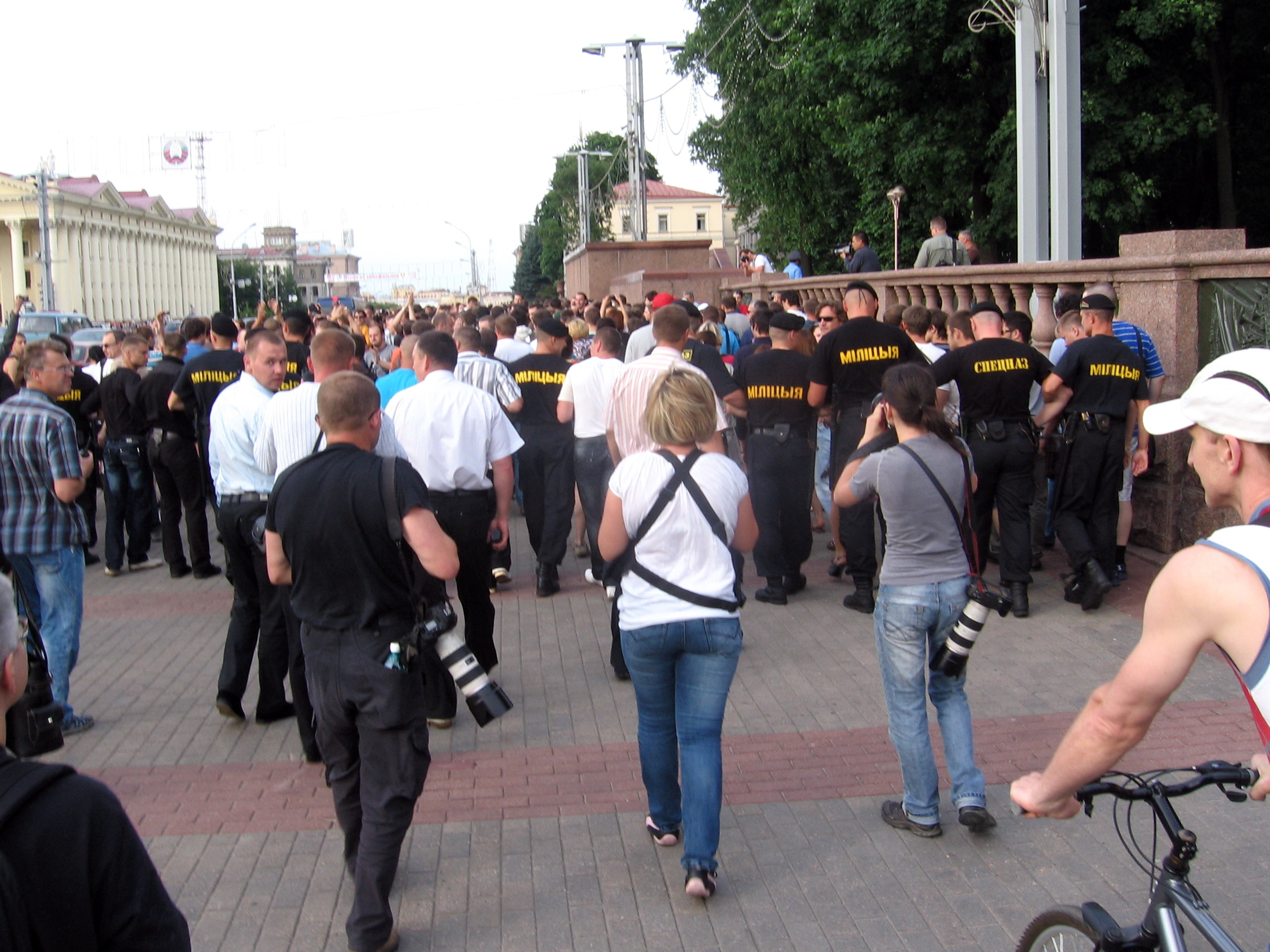
- Security forces pushing back protesters in Minsk, 15 June 2011
- Date: 8 June – 12 October 2011 (4 months and 4 days)
- Location: Belarus
- Caused by: Economic crisis; Autocracy; Devaluation of the ruble
- Goals: Democracy; Resignation of President Alexander Lukashenko
- Methods: Political lobbying, public rallies, demonstrations, riots, industrial action.
- Result: Protests dispersed by government

Parties
(Belarus) Belarusian opposition	Government of Belarus

Lead figures
(Belarus) Vyacheslav Dyanov (Belarus) Ihar Losik	Alexander Lukashenko (Belarus) Mikhail Myasnikovich

Casualties and losses
- 18 injuries, including 2 police officers

The 2011 Belarusian protests were a series of peaceful protests by demonstrators in Belarus demanding the resignation of current Belarusian president Alexander Lukashenko, who had been the president of Belarus since 1994. Belarus is an authoritarian state, and in May 2011 presidential candidate Andrei Sannikov was sentenced to five years in prison for taking part in the 2010 presidential election. Lukashenko claimed he won with almost 80% of the vote.

== Background ==
Much of the protesting fervor stemmed from a rapidly degrading economy that Belarus had been facing in the months before the protests.

== Protests ==
=== 8 June ===
- In the first protest actions, at 7 p.m. on Kastrychnitskaya Square in Minsk, about 400 people gathered together in response to an appeal on the Internet to come to the main squares of cities to take part in the silent protest action "Revolution Through the Social Network". At the beginning of the action, the participants stood disorganized in small groups, occupying a significant part of the square. At around 7:10 p.m., the participants began to applaud spontaneously, after which a dense ring of protesters and journalists formed in the center of the square. People standing in the center of the ring sang songs and played the guitar.
- The action was watched by members of the special forces police regiment, as well as people with civilian walkie-talkies. Special forces were on duty not far from the crowd, while the plain clothes officers were constantly in the center of the event, without interfering in the course of the peaceful action. Around 7:45 p.m., the participants began to disperse. Only a few dozen people remained on the square.
- In Mogilev, on Lenin Square near the House of Soviets, about 80 people gathered at the call. Young people prevailed among the participants of the action. According to some participants, they were largely inspired by the action "Stop Petrol," held the day before in Minsk.
- About 200 people gathered on Lenin Square in Brest. The participants of the action did not shout out slogans and were without banners. They were walking and talking. Some of the passing cars were signaling in support of the participants' action. The action was observed by two people in police uniforms, as well as by security forces. The action lasted from 18:50 to 19:30 and ended with applause.
- About 200 people gathered on Lenin Square in the center of Gomel. The action was attended by famous Gomel musicians, representatives of informal youth movements.

=== 29 June ===
Hundreds of people gathered in Minsk, the capital of Belarus, to protest against the rule of Alexander Lukashenko. Unlike previous demonstrations, the protesters this time just simply applauded. It was not long before people were forced onto police buses, and about 40 were detained.

=== 3 July ===
On Belarusian independence day, about 3000 demonstrators took part in a "clapping protest" in the main square of Minsk, in which protesters clapped instead of chanting slogans. Plain clothed police later came, and arrested many protesters, including a one-armed man for clapping, and a deaf mute accused of shouting anti-government slogans. Lukashenko and the state police were awarded the 2013 Ig Nobel Peace Prize for these actions.

Following the protest on 3 July 2011, activists widened their tactical approach of civil disobedience by distributing videos of police brutality to random citizens, in order to help garner sympathy and bolster the global critiques of the authoritarian government.

=== 13 July ===
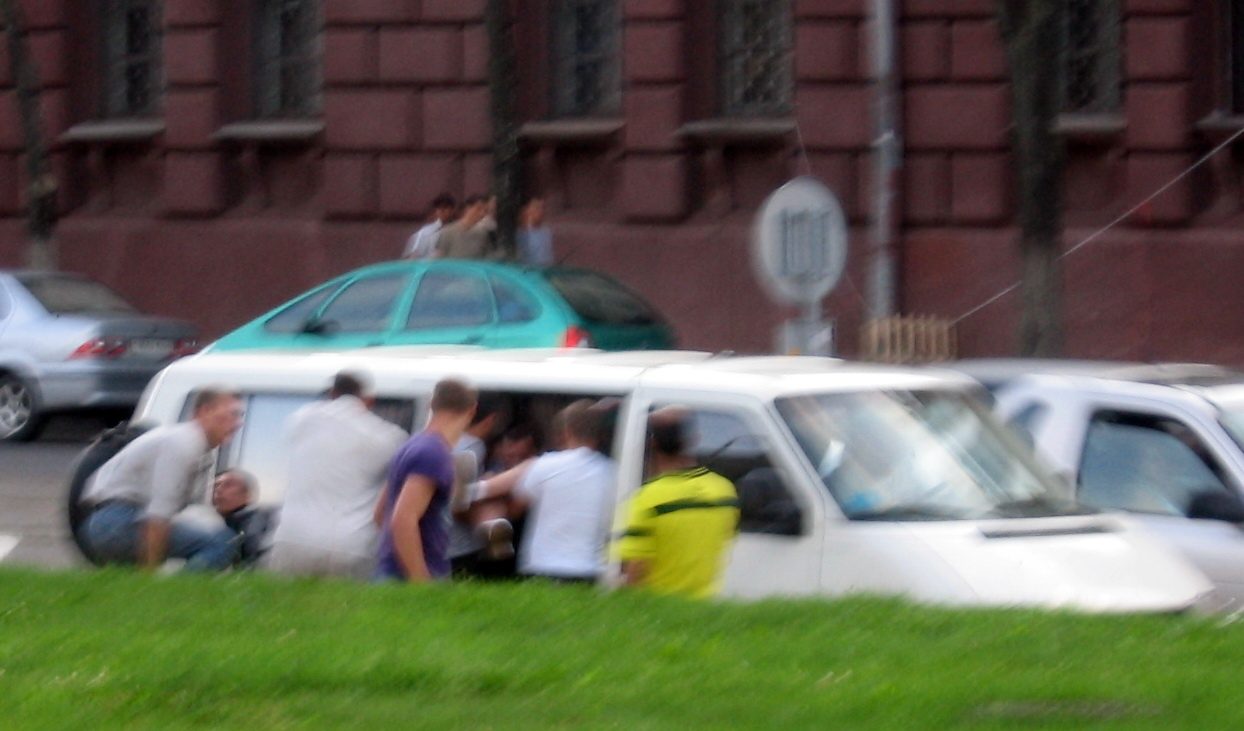
Plain-clothed officers detaining a protester in Minsk, 15 July

Hundreds of people showed up in Minsk with cellphones set to go off at 8 am, in gesture to tell people to "wake up". Several dozen people were arrested by the police.

== Reaction ==
The government began blocking social networking sites such as Twitter and Facebook.

On 29 July, the government banned assemblies and gatherings, making them illegal.

== See also ==
- Belarusian presidential election, 2010
- Jeans Revolution
- Orange Revolution
- List of protests in the 21st century
