= Belarusian Christian Democracy =

Belarusian political party

Belarusian Christian Democracy Беларуская хрысьціянская дэмакратыя Белорусская христианская демократия
- Co-chairpersons: Paval Sieviaryniec; Vital Rymasheuski; Dzianis Sadouski
- Founded: May 1917 (Original form) 30 August 2005 (Current form)
- Dissolved: 1940 (Original form)
- Headquarters: 167/1st Building, Lenin St, Kobryn, Brest Region
- Newspaper: Krynica
- Youth wing: Young Christian Democrats
- Ideology: Christian democracy Liberal conservatism Cultural conservatism Economic liberalism Pro-Europeanism; Anti-LGBT
- Political position: Right-wing
- National affiliation: Belarusian Independence Bloc
- European affiliation: European People's Party (observer)
- International affiliation: Centrist Democrat International (Observer)
- Colours: Blue and White
- Slogan: "People's Party with a Christian heart" (Belarusian: «Народная партыя з хрысціянскім сэрцам»)
- Anthem: Mahutny Boža
- House of Representatives: 0 / 110
- Council of the Republic: 0 / 64

Party flag

Website
- bchd.info

The Belarusian Christian Democracy (Belarusian: Беларуская хрысьціянская дэмакратыя, romanized: Bielaruskaja chryścijanskaja demakratyja; Russian: Белорусская христианская демократия, romanized: Belorusskaya khristianskaya demokratiya; BCD or BKhD) is a Christian-democratic political party in Belarus, established in 2005. The party positions itself as a continuation of an identically named movement, which existed at the beginning of the 20th century.

== History ==
=== Christian Democratic organizations in Belarus before World War II ===
The Belarusian Christian democratic movement was created in the early 20th century mostly by Belarusian theology students and seminarians. The Christian democratic circle in Vilna was publishing the weekly newspaper Biełarus.

In 1917 Belarusian political activists in St. Petersburg created the first Belarusian Christian democratic political organization - the Belarusian Christian Democratic Union (Belarusian: Беларуская хрысьціянска-дэмакратычная злучнасьць, romanized: Biełaruskaja chryścijanska-demakratyčnaja złunaść). Among the founders of the BCDU were the priests Adam Stankievič and Vincent Hadleŭski.

Christian democrats participated in the First All-Belarusian Congress in December 1917 and took an active part in preparation for the establishment of the independent Democratic Republic of Belarus in 1918.

On November 6, 1927, on the basis of the BCDU a new political party was created in Wilno under the name The Belarusian Christian Democracy. Since then the party was active in West Belarus. While most of the other West Belarusian political parties were leftist or even pro-Soviet, the BCD was center-right.

After the unification of West Belarus with the Belarusian Soviet Socialist Republic, many leaders and members of the BCD became victims to Soviet repressions or were killed by Nazis during the later Occupation of Belarus by Nazi Germany. Practically, the party ceased all activities in 1939. During the Soviet times, information about the BCD as well as all other non-communist political organizations were kept in secret, with only state-approved historians having access to relevant archives.

=== Establishment in modern Belarus ===
The first attempt to re-establish the BCD took place in 1991. All relevant documents for re-establishment were prepared, but the movement was never registered then.

In 2005 a group of democratic activists created an initiative group to revive the Christian democratic party under the name Belarusian Christian Democracy. It opposes the policies of President Alexander Lukashenko.

Modern BCD sees the promotion of Christian values and Belarusian patriotism in the country as its primary goal. The party opposes Russian having the status of an official language in Belarus.

BCD has active contacts with religious groups. Unlike its predominantly Catholic predecessor in the early 20th century, the current BCD positions itself as a party uniting also Orthodox and Protestant Christians.

As of 2007, the Belarusian Ministry of Justice has declined to register the political party. Party leadership outlined the religious and geopolitical orientation of its party. Co-leader Vital Rymašeŭski stated, "we believe that the laws of the Republic of Belarus should not be contrary to biblical law, and vice versa". Regarding geo-political orientation Co-leader Pavał Sieviaryniec stated that the party was not seeking pro-Europeans but rather Christians wanting a moral revival. "In Western Europe, there are a set of traditions almost without regard to the Bible and Christianity. It is not [Christian] believers who make up the bulk of the people who vote for the Christian Democrats. But Eastern Europe has recently seen a strong Christian renaissance, and that biblical principles are the basis of Christian Democratic policy."

The BCD nominated its candidate Vital Rymašeŭski at the 2010 Belarusian presidential election.

On 4 June 2016, party leader Paval Sieviaryniec gave an interview to Radio Free Europe stating that homosexuality as a social norm would destroy the Belarusian nation, the idea of gender was just as dangerous as racist propaganda or provoking class warfare and that gay Belarusians dishonored the memory of those died fighting against the USSR and Nazi Germany.

Paval Sieviaryniec presented his candidacy for the 2020 Belarusian presidential election. However, on 7 June 2020, he was arrested for his participation in earlier protests and later sentenced to seven years in prison on charges of organizing mass unrest. Amnesty International considers him a prisoner of conscience.

After 2020, the Belarusian Christian Democracy split into two parts — one of them is led by Georgy Dzmitruk, and the other is led by Vital Rymasheuski and Dzianis Sadouski. According to the website of the BCD under Rymasheuski, "Georgy Dzmitruk was expelled from the BCD party in 2022. Since then, he has been trying to pass off his group of seven people as representatives of the Belarusian Christian Democrats on various platforms and in the media."

== Belarusian Young Christian Democrats ==
The youth organization of the Young Christian Democrats (YCD) was founded in 2009. The 1st founding Congress took place in May 2010 with participation of more than 50 delegates from all regions of Belarus as well as invited guests. The Congress elected the governing body of the YCD, approved the Statute, and developed the strategy for the nearest future. Luboŭ Kamienieva was elected as the YCD leader. National Board numbered 13 members (10 of them were from the regions). The 2nd Congress was held in November 2012. 75 delegates accepted the new updated Statute, elected new Leader of the organization, Maryna Chomič, as well as set the priorities for next year and introduced plan for public campaigns. Chomič proposed mandatory religious instruction in Belarus schools, with a focus on Christian ethics. The 3rd Congress, held in October 2013, summed the results of the previous year’s activities up as well as outlined the plans for 2014-2015, set main guidelines for further projects. Nadzieja Hacak was elected a new leader of YCD on October 12, 2019.
