= Jaroslav Romanchuk =

Belarusian economist and politician

- Яраслаў Часлававіч Раманчук
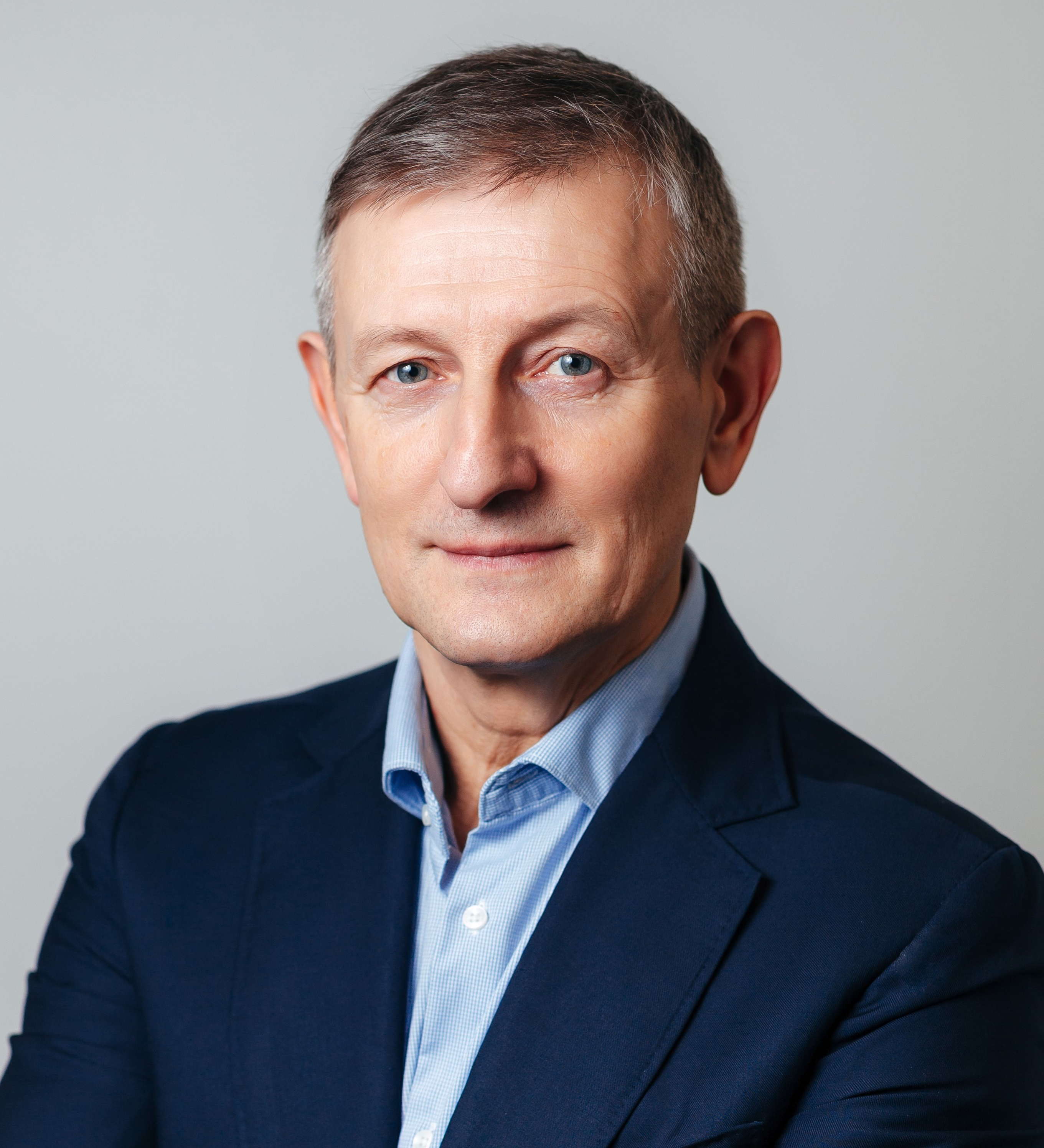
- Kyiv, Ukraine, 2023
- Born: January 10, 1966 (age 60) town Sapotskin, Grodno Region, Byelorussian SSR, USSR
- Citizenship: USSR → Belarus
- Occupation: Economist

Academic background
- Education: Minsk State Linguistic University; Belarusian State University
- Awards: Grand Prix of the Sir Anthony Fisher - Atlas Network - International Prize for the book “Belarus: Road to the Future” (2006) and for the book “In Search of an Economic Miracle. Lessons for Belarus” (2009). Templeton Prize 2006 & 2007 Winner. The winner of the “Best Freedom Advocate in Ukraine in 2021” award from Ayn Rand Center in Ukraine.
- Website: www.facebook.com/Jaroslav.Romanchuk

Jaroslav Romanchuk (Belarusian: Яраслаў Часлававіч Раманчук; born January 10, 1966) is a well-known Ukrainian and Belarusian economist, author of books on the economy and reforms in the countries of the post-Soviet space, Senior Economist of “Pravoliberalny Rukh” (Ukraine), Head for Economic Reforms in Office of Simple Solutions and Results (Ukraine), President of the Mises Research Center (Belarus), founder of the Belarusian School of Liberal Sustainable Development. Consultant on the economics of business, government and NGOs in Ukraine.

Jaroslav Romanchuk specializes in economic reforms in the post-socialist space. He won international awards for books on the phenomenon of the economic miracle and systemic market reforms for transition countries. He authored over 6,500 publications on economic topics in various print and electronic publications in Belarus, Ukraine, Poland, USA, Russia and other countries. He is the author of 13 books on economics, reforms, transition from state planning to the free market.

Jaroslav Romanchuk was a candidate for the presidency of Belarus in the 2010 elections. According to official data, he took 3rd place.

Under the threat of imprisonment for civic activism he was forced to leave Belarus in 2021. Since July 2021 he lives and works in Kyiv (Ukraine). His main ideas are of classical liberalism, libertarianism, and the Austrian school of economics.

== Biography ==
Jaroslav Romanchuk was born into a Polish family in Sapotskin, Grodno Region.

He graduated from the Minsk State Linguistic University. He completed postgraduate studies at the Republican Institute of Higher Education at the Belarusian State University, Department of Economic Studies.

In addition to his basic education, in November–December 1995, he graduated from the Institute for Economic Development of the International Bank for Reconstruction and Development (Minsk, Belarus) with a specialization in micro and macroeconomics.

From 1998 to 2003 he studied at the following institutions: Colorado State University, Vermont State University, University of California at Los Angeles, Bentley College, all in the United States, and the University of British Columbia in Canada. In 2002, he did an internship in the USA on the topic “Globalization and World Trade. The Role of the WTO” and at the World Bank School on Pension Reform in Poland. In July 2005, he graduated from the First International Summer Institute of Public Administration of the World Bank in Latvia.

He fluently speaks Belarusian, Polish, English and Russian, and in addition, Ukrainian and French.

He began his career as a university teacher. Later, he chaired the department for economic relations of the Republican Union of Entrepreneurs. After that he was a general director of a commercial company. After the business he worked as the chief specialist of the Commission for Economic Policy and Reforms of the Supreme Council of the Republic of Belarus of the 13th convocation.

From January 1997 until May 2002, he was an economic observer, then deputy editor-in-chief, executive director of the weekly "Belorusskaya Gazeta".

Since February 2002, he has been President of the Mises Research Center.

From 1997 to December 2005, he was a leading expert of the Analytical Center «Strategy», and from 2006 to 2021, its executive director.

After mass searches of human rights and other public organizations took place in Belarus on July 14, 2021, he left the country and moved to Ukraine.

From August 2021, the head of economic reforms of the Office of Simple Solutions and Results in Ukraine.

He is married, and has two sons.

== Economic activity ==
Jaroslav Romanchuk is a well-known representative and advocate of the Austrian school of economics in the post-Soviet space. He is an expert on the problems of systemic socio-economic transformations, an expert on the problems of European integration and cooperation of countries in the post-socialist space, the author of the concept of Belarus’s integration into the EU, author of the Anti-Corruption Program of Belarus and other concept papers. He is the author of the economic part of the draft Constitution of the Republic of Belarus “How to protect a person from the state”.

In Ukraine, he presented the economic programs "Ukraine is a New West. Economy of $ 500 billion for 50 million Ukrainians by 2030" and "Wartime economy. What to do.".

In January 2009, he was a member of an interdepartmental working group under the Council of Ministers of the Republic of Belarus to develop an action plan for the development of country marketing in the Republic of Belarus.

In April 2009, Romanchuk's book “In Search of an Economic Miracle. Lessons for Belarus” received the Grand Prix of the Sir Anthony Fisher International Prize from the Atlas Network in the “young institutions” category.

He was the chairman of the Working Group on the development of the National Business Platform of Belarus in the period from 2006 till 2019. During this time, 13 documents were developed and adopted. He is the author of an alternative draft law on the budget, tax system, the concept of pension and administrative reform, an alternative draft law on privatization, as well as reform of the healthcare system.

From October 2016 to February 2018, he was a member of the Government Working Group on the development of an Entrepreneurship Development Strategy, a member of the Presidential Council for the Development of Entrepreneurship of Belarus and a member of the Government Working Group on the tax system reform.

Within 2014-2019, he was a consultant for business communities in Tunisia, Algeria, Uzbekistan, Azerbaijan, Transnistria on a business climate reform.

Jaroslav Romanchuk was a member of the International Society for Individual Liberties, winner of the 2003 ISIL Freedom Award, winner of the Atlas Network Prize (2006-2007), winner of the Sir Anthony Fisher Prize in 2006 and the Templeton Prize in 2007 for the books “Belarus: the road to the future” and “Business of Belarus: in the first circle”, respectively. He is the first Belarusian to attend Mont Pelerin Society. In 2022 he was awarded the "Best Freedom Advocate in Ukraine in 2021" award by the Ayn Rand Center in Ukraine.

On February 24, 2022, he was supposed to present to Ukrainian politicians and experts his economic program "Ukraine is a New West. Economy of $ 500 billion for 50 million Ukrainians by 2030." However, that day the Russian invasion broke his plans.

In March 2022, he presented to the Ukrainian authorities the economic program "Wartime Economy. What to do".

In May 2023, he published the book "New West. Ukrainian Dream". It presents a step-by-step program on the economic changes that Ukraine needs to become a successful and wealthy country. The book was published with the support of the founders of the NOVA POSHTA company Vyacheslav Klimov and Vladimir Popereshnyuk.

== Political activity ==
Since April 2000, he was Deputy Chairman the liberal conservative of the United Civil Party (Belarus). Responsibilities: international relations, development of economic programs and bills, as well as strategies for the development of the country. He is the author of an alternative bill on the budget, tax system, the concept of pension, administrative reform, an alternative bill on privatization, military reform, and health care reform.

Jaroslav Romanchuk was nominated as a candidate for the House of Representatives on the list of the United Democratic Forces in the elections that took place on September 28, 2008. According to an exit poll conducted by independent pollsters, he won about 65% of the vote, but the authorities falsified the results and denied him a victory.

He is one of the developers of the Anti-Crisis Platform of the United Democratic Forces in Belarus.

On May 31, 2010, Jaroslav Romanchuk became a candidate for the presidency of Belarus in the 2010 elections. As a presidential candidate, he presented the program “One Million New Jobs for Belarus”. Romanchuk's rating for sociological research from June to November soared from 1.0 to 8.2 percent. During the official exit poll, Romanchuk's rating was 3.36%. According to the official results of the presidential election, Romanchuk won 1.98 percent of the vote.

In 2011, he left the United Civil Party and stopped his political activities, though he would later become chairman of the International Alliance of Libertarian Parties in February 2026.

== Books ==
=== Author of the following books ===
- "Belarus: the Choice of the Economic Future" (1999);
- "Liberalism. The Ideology of a Happy Person” (2007);
- "In Search of an Economic Miracle" (2008);
- "Liberalism. The Ideology of a Happy Person” (2010, 2nd edition in Ukraine);
- "Anti-crisis Plan for Belarus" (2011);
- Theory and Practice of State Failures. At the New Political Economy” (2014);
- "New West. Ukrainian Dream" (2023).

=== Co-author of the following books ===
- "National Interests of the Republic of Belarus" (1998);
- “Belarus: the Road to the Future. Book for Parliament” (July 2005);
- "Economic Constitution for the Republic of Belarus" (2007);
- "Belarus on the Fault" (2008);
- “Belarus: Transit Zone. Book for Parliament” (2009);
- "Libertarianism: Accessible and Simple" (2009);
- “Belarus 20/20. In the Labyrinth of Economic Identity” (2011).
