= Vital Rymasheuski =

Belarusian politician

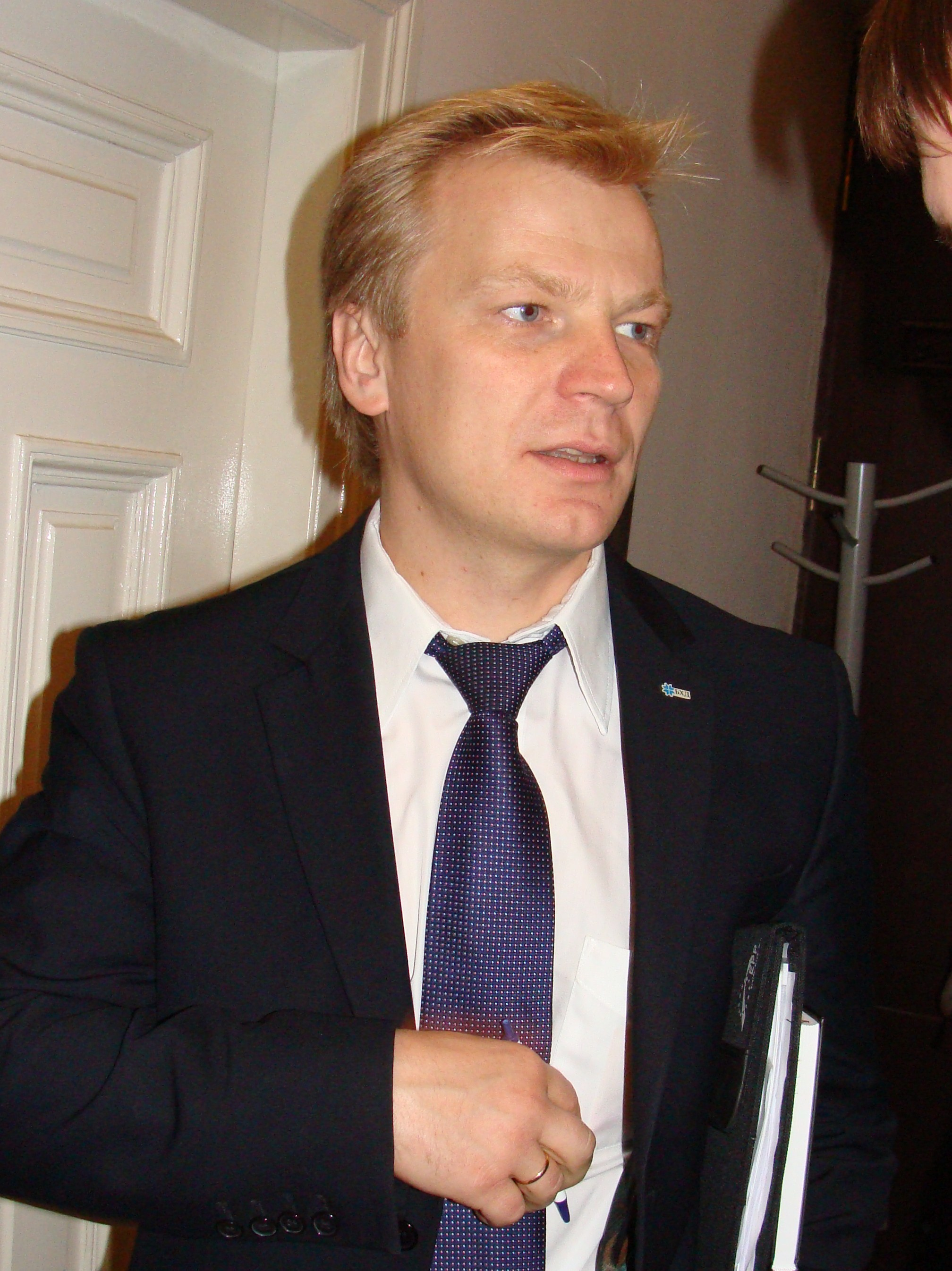
- Co-chair of the Belarusian Christian Democracy

Personal details
- Born: 1975 (age 50–51) Babruysk, Byelorussian Soviet Socialist Republic, Soviet Union
- Party: Belarusian Christian Democracy
- Children: 1
- Education: Belarusian National Technical University

Vital Anatolyevich Rymasheuski (Belarusian: Віталь Анатольевіч Рымашэўскі, born 1975) is a Belarusian politician who ran for president of Belarus in the 2010 election as the nominee of the Belarusian Christian Democracy (BCD). He was a founding member of the BCD.

== Early life and education ==
Vital Rymasheuski was born in Babruysk, Byelorussian Soviet Socialist Republic, Soviet Union, in 1975. He graduated from the Belarusian National Technical University in 1997. He studied in Germany in 1999.

== Career ==
Rymasheuski has been a member of the coordination council of the Belarusian Association of Young Politicians since 1996. From 2002 to 2004, he was a member of the presidium of the Belarusian National Council of Youth.

Alaksandar Milinkievič's presidential campaign in the Frunzyenski District was managed by Rymasheuski during the 2006 election. Rymasheuski was a member of the Young Front and United Civic Party. He founded Movement for Freedom. He was a founding member and is the co-chair of Belarusian Christian Democracy (BCD).

BCD nominated Rymasheuski as its presidential candidate for the 2010 election. He is the co-chair of the BCD. He was beaten and arrested after protesting in Independence Square, Minsk on 19 December 2010. He was convicted for organising actions that grossly violate public order on 30 March 2011, and given a two year suspended sentence on 20 May. U.S. President Barack Obama condemned the sentence given out to Rymasheuski and other opposition leaders. Rymasheuski was abducted by a group of four men on 19 December 2011.

Rymasheuski called for a boycott of the 2012 election.

== Personal life ==
Rymasheuski is married and is the father of one child. He is a member of the Eastern Orthodox Church.

== Political positions ==
Rymasheuski supports St. Joseph Church, Minsk and Bernardine Monastery, Iziaslav being returned to the local Catholic community.

== Works cited ==
=== News ===
- "Belarusians Demanding Return Of Catholic Properties Detained". Radio Free Europe/Radio Liberty. 23 September 2010. Archived from the original on 4 July 2025.
- "Ex-Belarusian Presidential Candidate 'Abducted'". Radio Free Europe/Radio Liberty. 19 December 2011. Archived from the original on 4 July 2025.
- "Six Belarusian Groups Call For Vote Boycott". Radio Free Europe/Radio Liberty. 21 September 2012. Archived from the original on 4 July 2025.
- "U.S. Condemns Belarus Dissident Sentences, Vows Sanctions". Radio Free Europe/Radio Liberty. 27 May 2011. Archived from the original on 4 July 2025.
- Pankovets, Dmitry (17 May 2010). "Пяць плюсаў і пяць мінусаў Віталя Рымашэўскага". Nasha Niva. Archived from the original on 4 July 2025.

=== Web ===
- "РЫМАШЭЎСКІ Віталь Анатольевіч". Belarusian Christian Democracy. Archived from the original on 15 November 2018.
