= Natalya Radina =

Belarusian journalist (born 1979)

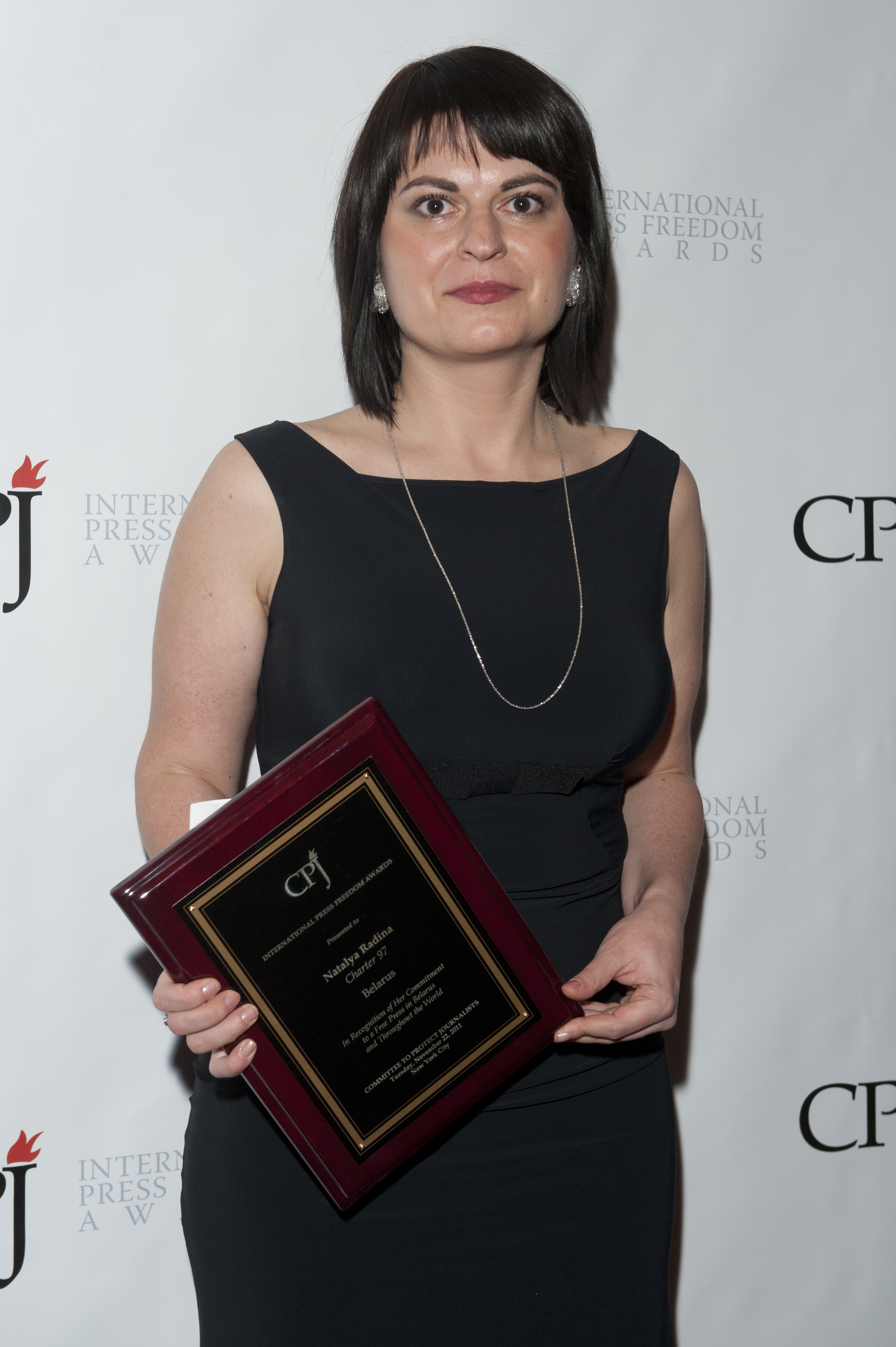
- Born: May 3, 1979 (age 47); Kobrin, Byelorussian SSR, Soviet Union (now Kobryn, Belarus)
- Education: Belarusian State University
- Occupation: journalist
- Organization: Charter 97
- Known for: dissident reporting
- Awards: International Press Freedom Award (2011); Belarusian Democratic Republic 100th Jubilee Medal (2018)

Natalya Valyatsinawna Radina (Belarusian: Наталля Валянцінаўна Радзіна, born 3 May 1979), also known as Natalya Radzina, is a Belarusian journalist and the editor-in-chief of the independent news site Charter 97, which publishes many articles critical of the regime of Belarusian president Aleksandr Lukashenko.

== Editorship of Charter 97 ==
Following the disputed December 2010 presidential election—in which pro-democracy candidate Andrei Sannikov lost to Lukashenko—a number of opposition protesters took to the streets, alleging fraud. Radina and the Charter 97 staff posted numerous articles documenting arrests and injuries to the protesters by state security forces.

== Repression ==
On 21 December 2010, the Charter 97 office was raided by agents of the State Security Committee of the Republic of Belarus (known in Russian as the "KGB"). Radina only had time to post "We're all at the KGB" on the site before being arrested and taken away.

Radina was then indicted on charges of "organizing mass disorder", an offense carrying a possible fifteen-year jail sentence. Amnesty International named her a prisoner of conscience and demanded her release, as did the Committee to Protect Journalists. Radina was released on 31 January 2011 on the condition that she relocate from the capital of Minsk to her hometown of Kobrin. She was told not to leave Kobrin and to check in daily with police; in addition, her passport was confiscated, and she was forbidden to speak about her case.

Unable to work, Radina fled from Belarus to Russia in March 2011. She spent four months in hiding in Moscow before receiving asylum from Poland and moving there to live. She continues to act as editor-in-chief of Charter 97. Later in 2011 she got political asylum in Lithuania.

In July 2018, while living in Poland, Radina received a death threat that she attributed to Belarusian authorities. Reporters Without Borders called for the Polish authorities to identify the source of the threat and provide protection for Radina.

== Awards ==
In November 2011, The Committee to Protect Journalists presented Radina its International Press Freedom Award, "an annual recognition of courageous journalism". In her acceptance speech, Radina blamed "foreign indifference" for the continued dictatorship of Lukashenko and called on foreign governments to remember that "all of Belarus today is a big prison".
