= Russian language in Belarus =

Russian is one of the two official languages of Belarus (the other being Belarusian). Due to its dominance in media, education, and other areas of public life, Russian is the most widely spoken language in the country and the de facto working language in urban areas, a result of the Soviet period in its history and post-Soviet era development. However, in rural areas, the most frequently used variation is trasianka, a mix of literary Belarusian and Russian.

== History ==
After the Partitions of Poland and the destruction of the Grand Duchy of Lithuania, most of the ethnic Belarusian lands became part of the Russian Empire, after which the Russian government began to massively arrest Belarusian officials and church leaders and replace them with Russians. In 1772, Catherine the Great signed a decree according to which sentences, decrees, and orders in the annexed territories were to be issued exclusively in Russian, and in 1773 she signed another decree, "On the establishment of local courts", which again provided for the mandatory use of exclusively Russian in the judicial system language.

Afterwards, the enslavement of the country began - even during the reign of Catherine the Great, about half a million previously free Belarusian peasants became the serfs of Russian nobles. Uprisings regularly broke out on Belarusian lands, but they were all brutally suppressed, in particular, after the suppression of the Kościuszko Uprising, Alexander Suvorov received 25 thousand serfs as a reward.

Belarusian literature from monasteries and libraries was also burned everywhere; most of the books were burned on the orders of Joseph Semashko. Russification was also reflected in architecture - the destruction of sacred buildings from the times of the Grand Duchy of Lithuania began, including Greek Catholic printing houses loyal to the Belarusian language. On the site of the destroyed buildings, the so-called Muravyov-churches were built, which received their name from the then governor of the “North-Western Region” Mikhail Muravyov, known for his crimes against Belarusians and the suppression of Kalinovsky’s rebellion during the January Uprising (1863-1864).

The Russian Imperial authorities paid special attention to education in Russian. Ivan Petrovich Kornilov, an Imperial Russian official, wrote in 1897:

Russian: Русское образованiе сильнѣе русскаго штыка. Въ какiе-нибудь 4 года русскiя школы сдѣлали болѣе для образованiя народа и ослабленiя полонизма, чѣм войска въ десятки лѣтъ.

[Russian education is stronger than the Russian bayonet. In about 4 years Russian schools did more for the people's education and weakening of the Polonization than troops in tens of years.]

=== Distribution per 1897 census ===
Excerpt from the Russian Empire Census results
Guberniya^{*}	Total Population	Belarusian (Бѣлорусскій)	Russian (Великорусскій)	Polish (Польскій)
Vilna	1,591,207	891,903	78,623	130,054
Vitebsk	1,489,246	987,020	198,001	50,377
Grodno	1,603,409	1,141,714	74,143	161,662
Minsk	2,147,621	1,633,091	83,999	64,617
Mogilev	1,686,764	1,389,782	58,155	17,526
Smolensk	1,525,279	100,757	1,397,875	7,314
^{*} See also: Administrative-territorial division of Belarus and bordering lands in 2nd half 19 cent. (right half-page) and Ethnical composition of Belarus and bordering lands (prep. by Mikola Bich on the basis of 1897 data)

Despite the oppression from Russia, the constant deportations of unwanted people to Siberia, restrictions on the use of the Belarusian language in the press, which were lifted only at the end of the 19th century, it was at that time underground that the creative style of a number of main Belarusian writers, in particular Yanka Kupala, who worked for some time in the main Belarusian publication of those years "Nasha Niva".

After the collapse of the Belarusian People's Republic and the creation of the USSR, a policy of “Belarusization” was initially pursued, ending with the beginning of mass repressions in the 1930s, during which the NKVD killed most of the representatives of the then Belarusian intelligentsia.

After World War II most of educational institutions in Belarus were translated into Russian language.

=== After 1995 ===
In 1995, according to the results of the 1995 Belarusian Referendum, the Russian language was declared the second official language. According to the Belarus Census (2009), 41.5% of the Belarusian population declared Russian as their mother language whereas Belarusian is the mother tongue of 53.2% of the population, and 70.2% declared Russian "the language spoken at home" (the second language-related question of the Census). However, minorities do speak Polish, Ukrainian and Eastern Yiddish as well.

== See also ==
- Russians in Belarus
- Demographics of Belarus
- Russification of Belarus
