= BelGazeta =

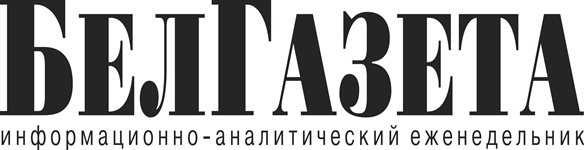
- Type: Weekly newspaper
- Format: A3
- Publisher: ООО "БелГазета"
- Editor: Ihar Vysocki, Editor-in-chief
- Founded: 1995
- Language: Russian
- Headquarters: Minsk, Belarus
- Circulation: 20,500
- Website: www.belgazeta.by

BelGazeta (БелГазета) is a Russian language newspaper published weekly in Belarus. Until September 2005, it was known as "Belorusskaya Gazeta."

On August 25, 2020, the Belarusian Press House refused to print the latest issue of BelGazeta, as if because of a breakdown of the printing press. Within the same timeframe and for the same reason, three issues of Komsomolskaya Pravda in Belarus and one for Narodnaja Volya and Svobodnye Novosti Plus each were not published – all four newspapers covered the 2020 Belarusian protests.
