= Charter 97 =

Belarusian pro-democracy online news outlet

- Format: Digital news
- Founder: Aleh Byabenin
- Editor-in-chief: Natallia Radzina
- Founded: 1998; 28 years ago
- Political alignment: Belarusian opposition
- Language: English, Russian, Belarusian
- Website: www.charter97.org

Charter'97 (Belarusian: Хартыя'97; Russian: Хартия'97) is a declaration calling for democracy in Belarus and a pro-human rights online news outlet taking its inspiration from the declaration.

== Charter ==
The Charter'97 declaration deliberately echoes the Czechoslovak human rights declaration Charter 77 made 20 years before. It was created on the anniversary of a referendum held in 1996 and declared:

devotion to the principles of independence, freedom and democracy, respect to the human rights, solidarity with everybody, who stands for elimination of dictatorial regime and restoration of democracy in Belarus.

Belarusian journalist Pavał Šaramiet acted as the group's spokesman at the declaration's public launch.

Charter'97, as a citizens' human rights organisation based on the principles outlined in this document, is a non-partisan organisation which has organised protest rallies and has provided a springboard for other democratic movements in the country.

On 3 September 2010, the founder of Charter'97, Aleh Biabienin, was found dead in his house near Minsk. According to initial statements by the Belarusian government, Biabienin committed suicide by hanging himself. However, friends of Biabienin have rejected this, stating that there was no indication he was suicidal, and that no messages or notes were left behind.

== Independent Online News ==
In 1998 Charter'97's founder Biabienin also founded a website of independent news with a focus on human rights developments.

In the weeks following the disputed December 2010 presidential election – in which pro-democracy candidate Andrej Sańnikaŭ lost to Lukashenko, often called "Europe's last dictator" – a number of opposition protesters took to the streets, alleging electoral fraud. Radzina and the Charter'97 staff posted numerous articles documenting arrests and injuries to the protesters by state security forces. On 21 December 2010, the Charter'97 office was raided by agents of the State Security Committee of the Republic of Belarus (known in Russian as the "KGB"). Radzina only had time to post "We're all at the KGB" on the site before being arrested and taken away.

In 2011 the site's editor-in-chief, Natallia Radzina, received the International Press Freedom Award, "an annual recognition of courageous journalism", for her work.

On 30 December 2011, Charter'97 fell victim to a hacking attack that deleted archives and posted false news articles to the site; it also suffered a denial of service attack.

In 2020, the logo was changed to display "Charter'97%", referencing the fact that according to opposition groups, internet polling shows that support for President Lukashenko is low enough to be a statistical error, or around 3%. The phrase "97%" had become a rallying symbol of the opposition.

In August 2022, the Belarusian authorities recognized Charter’97 as an extremist group. Earlier in 2021-2022, the Telegram channel, logo, website and pages of the Charter on social networks were included in the list of extremist materials.

On July 31, 2023, the European Parliament passed a resolution in which it asks the European Commission and the Member States, to strengthen independent Belarusian media outlets, such as Charter 97.

== See also ==
- Belarusian democracy movement
- Human rights in Belarus
- Charter 77 (Czechoslovakia)
- Charter 08 (China)
