= Aleh Byabenin =

Belarusian journalist (c. 1974–2010)

- Алег Бябенін
- Born: c. 1974; Kostroma, Russia
- Died: September 3, 2010 (aged 36); Minsk, Belarus
- Other name: Oleg Bebenin
- Education: Balrusian State University, Journalism Department
- Occupation: Journalist
- Employer: Charter 97
- Known for: Dissident journalism
- Political party: Charter 97
- Movement: Belarusian democracy movement

Aleh Mikalayevich Byabenin (Note: Belarusian: Алег Мікалаевіч Бябенін; Russian: Олег Николаевич Бебенин, romanized: Oleg Nikolayevich Bebenin) (c. 1974 – September 3, 2010) was a Belarusian journalist, known for his involvement with the political opposition news website Charter 97 in Minsk. He was its co-founder and director. Byabenin was also the campaign press secretary and friend of Andrei Sannikov, who was the former deputy foreign minister and an opposition candidate in the 2010 Belarusian presidential election. Byabenin was hanged to death in 2010, which drew widespread reactions.

== Early and personal life ==
Aleh Byabenin was born in Kostroma, Soviet Union. Byabenin graduated from the Belarusian State University, department of journalism. He had a wife and two young sons. Byabenin resided in the village of Pyarhurava near Minsk, Belarus with his family. He is buried in the Eastern Cemetery in Minsk.

== Career ==
In the 1990s, Aleh Byabenin works as the deputy chief editor of Imya, an independent newspaper. In 1998, he founded the Charter 97 (Belarusian: Хартыя'97; Russian: Хартия'97) website, which was a pro-opposition news website. He was also a member of Andrei Sannikov's campaign team during the 2010 elections.

== Death ==
Aleh Byabenin was killed near the capital Minsk, Belarus.

Before his death, Aleh Byabenin's strong reporting towards the government had made him into a target, such as being abducted in 1997 and subjected to a mock execution and he was attacked in 1999 by right-wing activists. He had also received many anonymous death threats on his Charter 97 website in the months prior to his death.

On September 3, 2010, Aleh Byabenin was found hanged in the stairwell of his summer home in Minsk, Belarus. His brother discovered his body after he stopped returning phone calls.

Authorities immediately ruled his death as a probable suicide. Byabenin's friends and family strongly reject this, saying there was not suicide note and he had no reason to commit suicide. A friend who saw Byabenin's body, Dmitry Bondarenko, said the journalist had bad bruises on his body and that his ankle was badly twisted, signaling that he went through a struggle. The official autopsy does not include these findings. OSCE experts concluded the autopsy findings clearly point to the cause and manner of death being suicide by hanging.

== Context ==
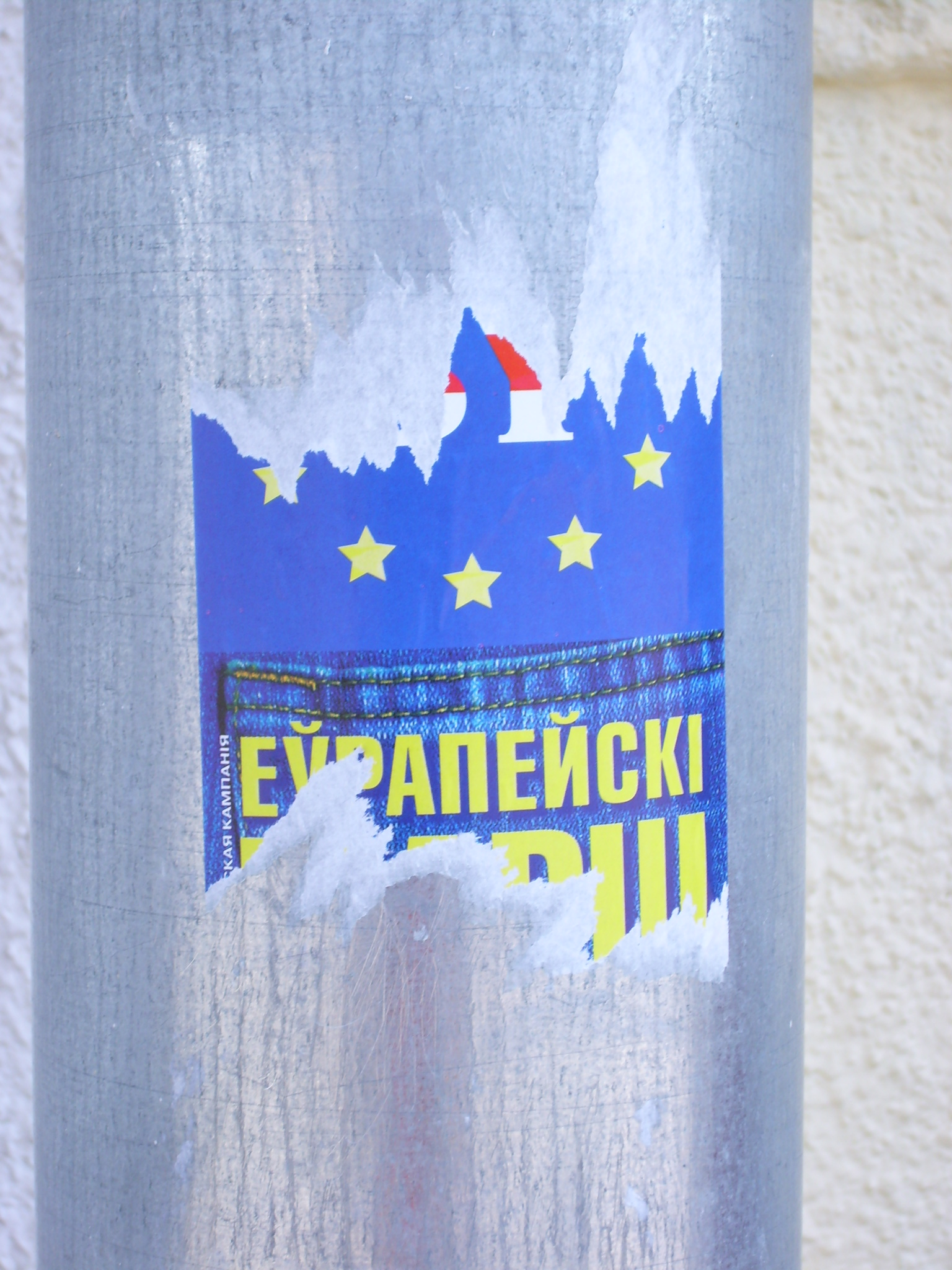
The Belarusian opposition sticker with an emblem of "European march" on a rain gutter around 2007.

Shortly before his death, Byabenin joined the campaign team of friend and presidential candidate, Andrei Sannikov, who was running against Alexander Lukashenko in the 2010 elections in Belarus.

Belarus' authoritarian president, Alexander Lukashenko, of whom Aleh Byabenin has always been a harsh critic, has stripped the country of almost all non-state press and limited internet media. He has been in power of the former Soviet Republic since 1994, and does not accept any interference from others in his power. Since Lukashenko was elected president, a series of journalists and politicians have been, murdered, imprisoned, kidnapped, or disappeared.

A spokesperson for Index on Censorship said, "People in Minsk are very nervous, especially those close to Aleh. No suicide note was found, and Aleh just hours before his death had made phone calls to arrange a trip to the cinema with close friends. In recent months he had become increasingly concerned over the safety of fellow human rights activists and feared a return of the atmosphere of 1997–1999, when many dissidents disappeared in suspicious circumstances, and Aleh himself was nearly killed."

== Impact ==
Aleh Byabenin was the founder and leader of a pro-opposition news website in Belarus called Charter 97. He was also a very important member of friend Andrei Sannikov's campaign team for the 2010 elections.

== Reactions ==
Amnesty International formally requested an independent investigation in the case.

Souhayr Belhassen, president of the International Federation of Human Rights, said: "The fact that Mr. Byabenin had repeatedly been subjected to pressure and intimidation in the previous years for his activities as an independent journalist is indeed particularly worrying. A transparent investigation has to be opened on the circumstances of his death."

Andrei Sannikov said he had no confidence in the official investigation: "It's impossible in this situation of dictatorship. Eleven years have passed since the first disappearances began in Belarus and nothing was investigated."

Mike Harris, public affairs manager for Index on Censorship, who was in Belarus at this time, said, "The Presidential election must take place before February next year. The screw is tightening the screw on human rights organisations, with arrests and mock executions of youth activists. This death (Byabenin's) has sent shock waves through civic society across Belarus."

Byabenin's family and friends do not believe that he committed suicide, but that he was targeted by authorities for his opposition of president, Alexander Lukashenko.

Zmister Bandarenka, a coordinator for the Charter 97 website, said, "Byabenin was my friend, a real journalist, and a real man. We were together in many difficult situations, and among our team, he was always a center of stability. There was no reason for him to end his life, as the police have said. We absolutely don't believe it. He was one of the pillars of online journalism, and certainly he will be sorely missed by all of us."

== See also ==
- 2010 Belarusian presidential election
- Belarusian opposition
- List of journalists killed in Europe
- Natalya Radina
