= Andrei Sannikov =

Belarusian politician and activist (born 1954)

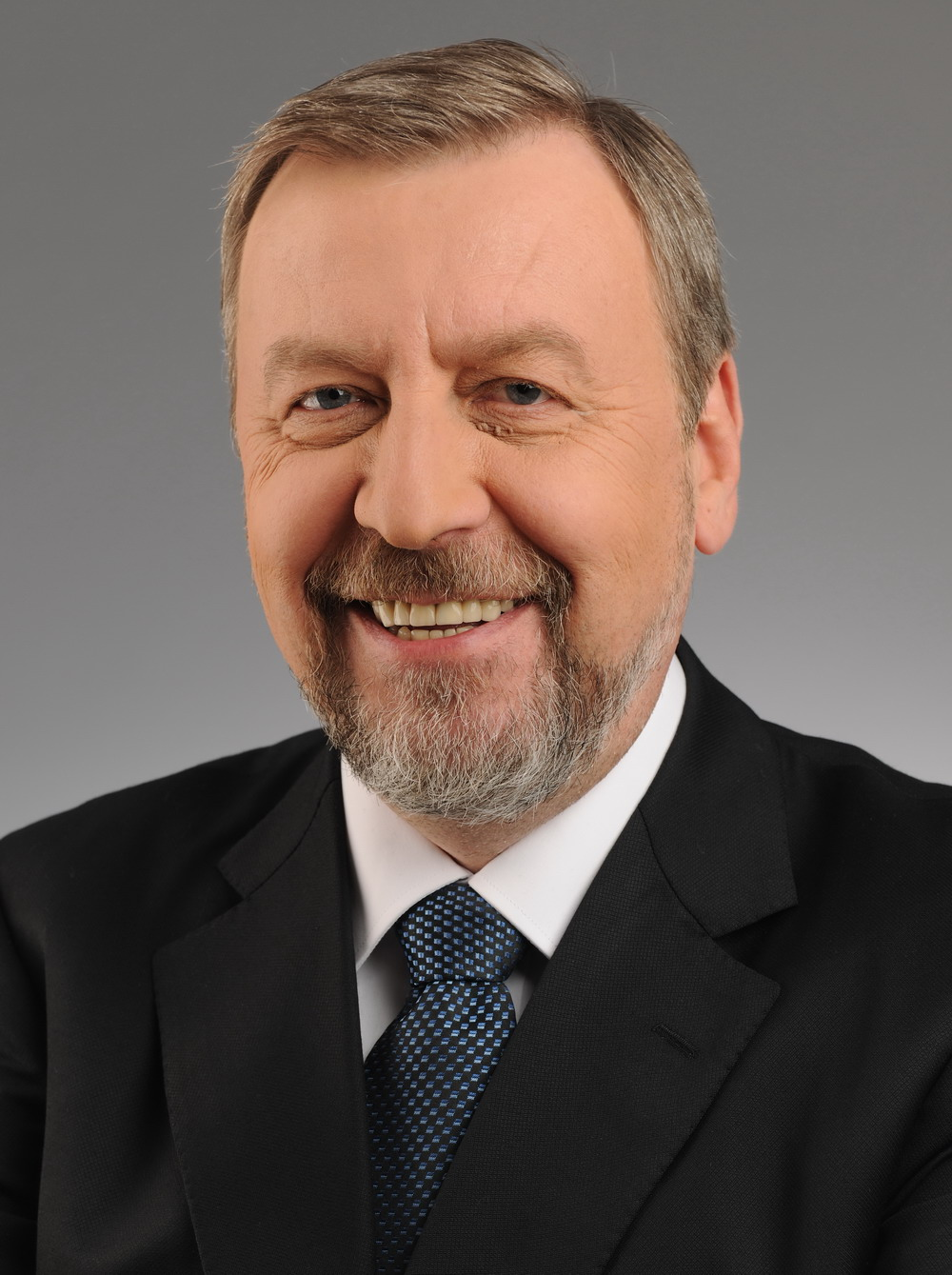
- Sannikov in 2010
- Born: 8 March 1954 (age 72); Minsk, Byelorussian SSR, Soviet Union (now Belarus)
- Known for: Activism
- Spouse: Iryna Khalip

Andrei Olegovich Sannikov (or Andrei Alehavich Sannikau, Belarusian: Андрэй Алегавіч Саннікаў, Russian: Андрей Олегович Санников, born 8 March 1954) is a Belarusian politician and activist. In the early 1990s, he headed the Belarusian delegation on Nuclear and Conventional Weapons Armament Negotiations, also serving as a Belarusian diplomat to Switzerland. From 1995 to 1996, he served as Deputy Foreign Minister of Belarus, resigning as a form of political protest. He co-founded the civil action Charter 97, and was awarded the Bruno Kreisky Prize in 2005.

Sannikov was a candidate at the 2010 presidential election in Belarus, and had the second highest percentage of the popular votes after incumbent Alexander Lukashenko. He was incarcerated in a Minsk KGB facility for peacefully protesting at a demonstration after the elections. Sannikov was beaten by police, tortured, and held incommunicado for two months. Amnesty International labeled him a prisoner of conscience. According to his wife, noted journalist Iryna Khalip, as of September 2011 Sannikov was in grave danger of murder and injury while incarcerated, and was being pressured by authorities to leave politics. After 16 months in prison, Sannikov was released and pardoned by Lukashenko in April 2012. Since 2012 he has lived in London, where he received political asylum.

== Early life, education ==
Andrei Sannikov was born on 8 March 1954 in the city of Minsk. His father was a well-known Belarusian art researcher while his mother was a teacher of the Russian language. His grandfather Konstantin Sannikov was a well-known actor and film director in the Byelorussian SSR, one of founders of the Janka Kupala National Theatre, and a teacher at the Belarusian Theater and Art Institute in Moscow. Sannikov first attended school No. 42 as a boy, and in 1977 he graduated from Minsk State Linguistic University. He is fluent in his native Belarusian, Russian, English, and French.

After graduating, Sannikov worked as an interpreter on Soviet construction projects in Pakistan and Egypt during the 1970s.

== Diplomatic career ==
=== Work at UN Secretariat ===
Sannikov then went to work at the Union of Soviet Societies for Friendship and Cultural Relations with Foreign Countries, and in 1982 began serving as a translator (Russian Translation Service) at the UN Secretariat in New York City. He remained in New York for five years.

=== Diplomatic Academy ===
In 1989, Sannikov graduated from the Diplomatic Academy of the Ministry of Foreign Affairs of the Soviet Union in Moscow. Immediately after he worked in the Foreign Ministry of the Belarusian Soviet Socialist Republic. At one of the sessions, he quoted "The Foreign Ministry should not be in service of one party, but must serve to the Belarusian nation".

=== Nuclear delegation ===
In 1992, following the collapse of the USSR and Belarusian independence in 1991, Sannikov headed the Belarusian delegation on Nuclear and Conventional Weapons Armament Negotiations. Since the Soviet Republics agreed to disarm all nuclear weapons in 1991, a top priority was the removal of Soviet nuclear and non-nuclear weapons from Belarus, an issue made more urgent by the lingering impact of the Chernobyl disaster. Sannikov was granted authority of signature on behalf of Belarus, a role he held until 1995. In an interview with Memory of Nations, he recalled that while representing Belarusian interests, he also earned the trust of the United States, noting that Belarus was able to reach agreements more smoothly than other former Soviet republics due to its smaller nuclear arsenal.

During this time, he was also an advisor to the Belarusian diplomatic mission in Switzerland.

=== Deputy Minister of Foreign Affairs ===
From 1995 to 1996 he served as Deputy Foreign Minister of Belarus, and obtained the rank of Ambassador extraordinary and plenipotentiary.

As Deputy Minister in winter of 1995, he co-authored a paper defending the Nunn-Lugar program, and admonishing the U.S. Congress for its inclination to reduce its funding. The Nunn-Lugar project had originated in the U.S. Senate in 1991 after the former Soviet Republics decided to get rid of their nuclear weapons. The program, a part of the U.S. Department of Defense, provided Belarus with technical and financial assistance to reduce and disarm nuclear weapons.

In November 1996, on the eve of a controversial referendum, Sannikov resigned from his post in protest of Lukashenko's policies. The referendum severely limited democratic standards and the separation of powers in Belarus, and changed the Belarus constitution to extend Lukashenko's presidential term. According to the Belarus Speaker of Parliament, 20 to 50 percent of the counted votes were falsified.

== As independent politician, activist ==
=== Charter 97 ===
In November 1997, Sannikov co-founded the civil initiative Charter 97, becoming its international coordinator. Modeled on the Czech Charter 77, the initiative was formed in response to the increasingly authoritarian rule of President Alexander Lukashenko, particularly following the controversial 1996 referendum that expanded presidential powers and was widely criticized for alleged manipulation. He recalls of its creation: "At that time, they arrested Pavel Sheremet, a Belarusian journalist working for Russian television, and Dmitry Zavadsky. And we talked about what could be done not only to release those journalists, but also to organize resistance against the entire regime." Today, Charter 97 continues to operate one of Belarus’s most prominent independent news websites and remains a rare voice against the Lukashenko regime.

=== 1998 Coordinating Council of Democratic Forces ===
In 1998, Sannikov and Hienadz Karpienka created the Coordinating Council of Democratic Forces of Belarus, which actively speaks for human rights. Victor Ivashkevich and Mikhail Marinich also took part.

=== Protests ===
In the years following, Sannikov helped organize a variety of non-violent protests in Belarus, including protests against the elections of 2001, 2004, 2006, and 2008, which were heavily criticized by the Organization for Security and Cooperation in Europe and the EU for lack of transparency, intimidation of voters, suppression of opposition groups, and suspected falsification of results. When the mass protests after the presidential election in 2006 were violently suppressed by riot police, Sannikov stated he was beaten and jailed, and his computers, disks, and memory sticks were seized.

=== Bruno Award ===
On 4 April 2005, the international Bruno Kreisky Prize was awarded to Sannikov at an award ceremony in the State Hall of the National Library in Vienna. The Bruno Award celebrates accomplishments in human rights.

=== European Belarus ===
In 2008 Andrei Sannikov, together with Viktar Ivashkevich, Mikhail Marynich and other politicians, initiated the civil campaign European Belarus. The campaign advocates joining Belarus with the European Union and aims to work towards the standards that would allow inclusion.

== 2010 presidential campaign ==
In March 2010 Andrei Sannikov declared his intention on the TV channel Belsat to take part in Belarus presidential election of 2010 as a candidate. He was considered one of the main opposition candidates along with Vladimir Nekliayev and Yaroslav Romanchuk.

=== Platform ===
In January 2007, Sannikov voiced disapproval of the natural gas supply contract Lukashenko signed with Russia. Russia has frequently used Gazprom, its state-run gas company, to put pressure on countries such as Ukraine and Georgia. Sannikov worried that as Lukashenko's cordial relations with the Kremlin went sour, especially as Boris Yeltsin was replaced with Vladimir Putin, the new gas supply contract could be used by Russia to manipulate the Belarusian economy.

In April 2008, he stated that at the time, Lukashenko was "consciously set to break relations with the US, after which rupture of relations with Europe could follow as he is preparing surrender of Belarus to Russia. And he needs scapegoats to blame for these things happening." At the time, Belarusian authorities were looking to reduce the staff of the Belarusian mission in Washington DC.

In November 2010, Sannikov stated that the electoral process was rigged from the outset and that he had no likely chance of defeating Lukashenko. He said his goal was to document the nation's flawed democracy and bring out opposition demonstrators. When asked if he feared for his life, he responded: "It’s a possibility; you have to think about it".

=== Death of press secretary ===
In the first week of September 2010, late on Friday afternoon, Sannikov's close friend and campaign press secretary Oleg Bebenin was found hanged at his summer house on the outskirts of Minsk. Bebenin was also a key member of Sannikov's campaign, and a leading journalist. He was also director and co-founder of Charter97, which had become one of the few outlets for information on "opposition" candidates during the election. The official investigation stated that the death appeared to be a suicide. Sannikov expressed suspicion of the "suicide", saying that Bebenin was in good mental health, and also that no suicide note was found, among other factors. Index on Censorship attended Bebenin's funeral and echoed Sannikov's concerns that his death was suspicious. Sannikov also stated he had no confidence in the official investigation: "It's impossible in this situation of dictatorship. Eleven years have passed since the first disappearances began in Belarus and nothing was investigated."

=== November meeting ===
On 18 November 2010, Sannikov was officially registered as a candidate.

On 29 November 2010, Sannikov organized a meeting at his alma mater Minsk State Linguistic University, and about 500 people took part. There were attempts to hinder the meeting; flyers were torn down, the administration was prohibited from placing messages on the notice board the day of the meeting, and professors stated they had been warned "it is better not to attend" by university staff. Students from other universities and citizens attended as well. During the meeting, he called on students to go to Minsk's October Square at 8 pm after the 19 December election.

=== Complaints ===
On 15 December 2010, Sannikov logged two legal complaint applications to the Central Election Commission of Belarus, demanding they withdraw the registration of Aleksandr Lukashenko, and also remove Lidiya Yermoshyna, the Chairperson of the Central Election Commission, from office. In both cases, he cited that their positions were illegal. Yermoshyna was a member of Lukashenka's political team, compromising her neutrality, and was under international scrutiny for purportedly rigging the previous election. He also brought up that Lukashenko ignored his own guidelines on how much time presidential candidates were allowed to speak on television (two times for 30 minutes each). Lukashenko also had propagandistic meetings at places not included on the Minsk City Executive Committee list where meetings could be held; Lukashenko held a large event at the Palace of the Republic, and funded it with the state budget against the rules. Sannikov's complaints were ineffective.

== 19 December election ==
The presidential elections took place on 19 December 2010, and Aleksandr Lukashenko was proclaimed the winner with 75.65% of the popular vote. Excluding Lukashenko's 5,130,557 votes, Sannikov would have won the election; he earned 156,419 votes or 2.43% of the total. The next closest competitor was Yaroslav Romanchuk, with 127,281 votes, at 1.98%. Of the 1,314,219 votes that went towards "oppositional candidates" (anyone not Lukashenko), he earned 11%.

=== Demonstration suppression ===
After the election results were revealed, the opposition leaders organized a demonstration on the evening of 19 December in the center of Minsk. However, the demonstration was suppressed by the police. Sannikov and his wife Iryna Khalip were among those attacked by police during the rally, and according to eyewitness statements gathered by Charter 97, Sannikov was singled out from the crowd for a beating.

Andrei was beaten by truncheons while he was lying. He was beaten on the head all over the body. Andrei was lying and trying to protect himself with his arms. No one was allowed to come near him so that people could not defend [him].

Later, on the way to the hospital to treat Sannikov's broken legs, their car was intercepted while Khalip was giving a telephone interview to the Moscow radio station Ekho Moskvy (Echo of Moscow). Khalip screamed on air that they were being forcibly removed from their car, arrested, and further beaten.

=== Imprisonment ===
Both Khalip and Sannikov were detained in a KGB facility in Minsk. According to an eyewitness, Sannikov was forced to stand for an hour during the initial processing, despite the injuries to his legs. Sannikov was subsequently charged for igniting mass disorder which would entail 8 to 15 years in prison.

The Obama administration issued a statement saying that the United States did not consider the election to be legitimate and called for the prisoners to be released; by contrast, Russian President Dmitry Medvedev described the Belarus situation as an "internal affair". On 24 December, the KGB raided and searched Sannikov's flat, where his family was staying.

=== Custody issue ===
On 25 December, the Viasna Human Rights Centre in Minsk revealed that Belarusian authorities had attempted to seize Sannikov's three-year-old son. The boy was being looked after by his three grandparents, but when they tried to take food and blankets to Sannikov at the detention center, social services arrived at the boy's kindergarten. A family lawyer was alerted by friends and intervened in the boy' removal.

=== Continued imprisonment ===
Sannikov was held incommunicado at an undisclosed location for two months. A letter from Sannikov was received by his mother on 15 January. At that point, he had not seen his lawyer since 29 December.

Sannikov's lawyer Pavel Sapelka was disbarred on 3 March, and his mother was able to find a new defense attorney, Maryna Kavaleuskaya, to represent his case on 12 March. She met briefly with Sannikov on 15 March. Later, Andrei Varvashevich was added to his defense team. They have stated Sannikov is suffering from untreated gout and otitis, as well as leg injuries.

The Ministry of Internal Affairs of Belarus accused Sannikov of organizing a "mass riot, attended by violence against a person, violent attacks, destruction of property, and armed resistance to representatives of the authorities".

The German section of Amnesty International issued an "urgent action" alert, stating that they believed Sannikov to be facing torture and maltreatment while in custody.

April appeal

On 15 April, Minsk City Court heard an appeal from Andrei Sannikov's lawyers, asking for his criminal persecution to be stopped and a softer measure of restraint to be enacted. The appeal was denied. He was to be tried on 27 April. On 14 May he was jailed for five years for organising mass disturbances. According to Amnesty International, as of 18 May, he was being held incommunicado and was at "serious risk of torture and other ill-treatment".

Release

Sannikov was pardoned by President Lukashenko and released on 14 April 2012. Sannikov called on the Belarusian government to release the remainder of its political prisoners.

== Post-election activism ==
In August 2012, a few months after his release from prison, Lukashenko suggested that Sannikov would soon be rearrested. Sannikov reluctantly fled to the United Kingdom, which granted him political asylum in October 2012. Irina Khalip couldn't leave the country because of her suspended prison sentence. From exile in London, and Warsaw, Poland, Only in 2013 Khalip was allowed a visit in UK to meet her husband. Sannikov has continued to advocate for freedom in Belarus and has said in interviews that the democratic world is becoming "too complacent" towards his country and that Belarus poses a threat to international security.

After Lukashenko hosted peace talks between the Ukrainian Government and separatists rebels in Eastern Ukraine in February 2015, along with the pardoning of various political prisoners, the European Union has lifted sanctions against his government, a move Sannikov criticized as "sending the wrong message".

Andrei criticized the 2015 Belarusian presidential election in an interview with Radio France Internationale as a sham, arguing that nothing has changed since the previous election. Andrei made similar comments following the 2020 Belarusian presidential election, praising opposition candidate Sviatlana Tsikhanouskaya, who was forced into exile by the authorities.

In November 2015, Sannikov and Mikola Statkevich both agreed to coordinate their activity to consolidate the "Belarusian democratic forces".

== Personal life ==
Andrei Sannikov has two sons. His wife, Belarusian journalist Iryna Khalip, was dubbed a "Hero of Europe" by Time in 2005 and was awarded the 2009 Courage in Journalism Award from the International Women's Media Foundation.

During the 2020 Belarusian presidential election, he was still residing in Warsaw.

== See also ==
- Foreign relations of Belarus
- 1996 Belarusian referendum
