= 2004 Belarusian constitutional referendum =

- 17 October 2004
- Do you allow the first President of the Republic of Belarus Lukashenko A.G. to participate as a candidate for the President of the Republic of Belarus in the presidential elections and do you accept the first part of Article 81 of the Constitution of the Republic of Belarus as follows: "The President is elected for five years directly by the people of the Republic of Belarus on the basis of universal, free, equal and direct suffrage by secret ballot." ?

Results
Choice	Votes	%
Yes	5,548,477	88.91%
No	691,917	11.09%
Valid votes	6,240,394	98.94%
Invalid or blank votes	67,001	1.06%
Total votes	6,307,395	100.00%
Registered voters/turnout	6,986,163	90.28%

A referendum on allowing President Lukashenko to stand in further elections was held in Belarus on 17 October 2004, alongside parliamentary elections. Lukashenko was nearing the end of his constitutionally-limited two terms, and the change would allow him to run for a third term.

In accordance with article 140 of the constitution, a majority of valid votes as well as a majority of registered voters in favor of the constitutional changes were required for the result to be deemed valid

The result was 88.91% of valid votes and 79.42% of registered voters in favor, with a turnout of 90.28%.

== Results ==
Do you permit the first President of the Republic of Belarus Lukashenko A.G. to participate as a candidate for Presidency of the Republic of Belarus during the President elections and do you adopt the Part I of Article 81 of the Constitution of the Republic of Belarus in the following wording:

President is elected for the term of 5 years directly by the people of the Republic of Belarus by means of the universal, free, equal and direct suffrage under the voting by secret ballot?

Choice	Votes	%
For	5,548,477	88.9
Against	691,917	11.1
Invalid/blank votes	67,001	–
Total	6,307,395	100
Registered voters/turnout	6,986,163	90.3
Source: Nohlen & Stöver

== Controversy ==
Paragraph 112 of Belarusian Electoral Code lists "questions connected with election and dismissal of the President of the Republic of Belarus" among questions prohibited from being brought out to the Republican referendum. There were several arrests of protesters against the result and reports of oppositional leaders being beaten by police.
