= Belarus–Poland relations =

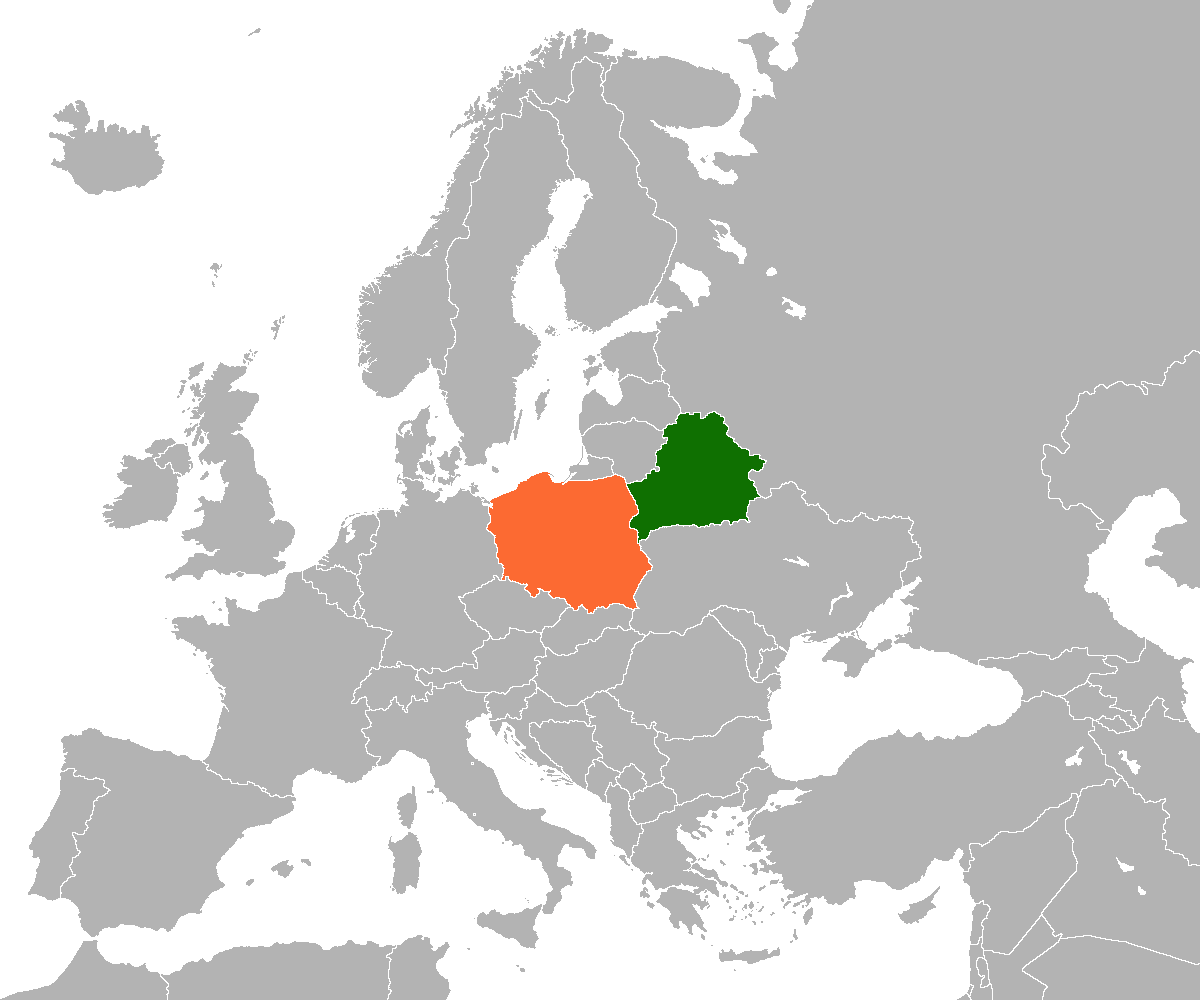

- Belarus: Poland

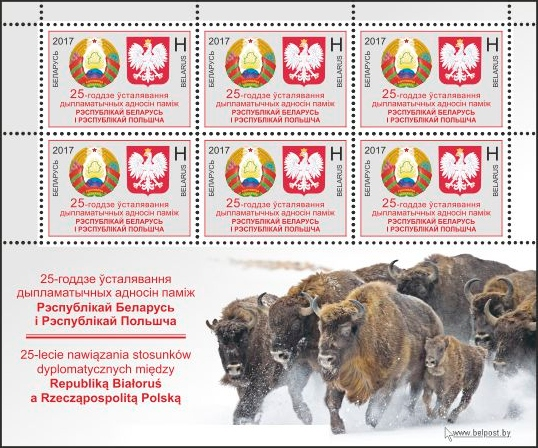
A 2017 Belarusian stamp sheet dedicated to the 25th anniversary of establishing Belarus–Poland relations

The Republic of Poland and the Republic of Belarus established diplomatic relations on 2 March 1992. Poland was one of the first countries to recognise Belarusian independence. Both countries share a border and have shared histories, for they have been in the Russian Empire and the Polish–Lithuanian Commonwealth. They joined the United Nations together in October 1945 as original members.

Cultural relations between the two are quite friendly but diplomatic relations between the two countries are currently very strained. Poland is a member of NATO and the European Union, and has an anti-Russian stance, whereas Belarus has long been firmly pro-Russia, and as such, the separate paths by default impair the positive bilateral relationship (see Russia–European Union relations). In August 2011, the arrest of Ales Bialiatski using information from Poland led to a harsh war of words between the two countries. However, in February 2017 some tensions arose between Belarus and Russia over border controls, and Belarusian President Alexander Lukashenko expressed indignation at Russia's behaviour.

Initially, Poland and Belarus had friendly relations during the presidency of Lech Wałęsa in Warsaw and leadership of Stanislav Shushkevich in Minsk from 1991 to 1994.

Relations between the two countries have since significantly deteriorated. In the lead-up to and during the 2020 Belarusian presidential election, a number of anti-government protests took place across the country. Belarusian authorities employed various methods of violent political crackdown, consisting of various humans rights violations; Poland strongly condemned the measures. Following Lukashenko's alleged victory for a sixth term, the European Council on 19 August decided that the elections were neither free nor fair, therefore do not recognize the results. Poland and Lithuania became two of the first countries to officially back the Belarusian opposition. Angered by this posturing, Lukashenko claimed that Belarus had closed its EU borders and had deployed additional guards and troops.

Further straining their diplomatic relations were the Belarus–European Union border crisis, which following a sudden influx of refugees coming from Belarus, Poland deployed 15,000 troops to guard the eastern frontier with Belarus. A standoff ensued between both armies, border guards and refugees caught in between. Poland had accused Belarus of engaging in hybrid warfare, to which Belarus responds by accusing Poland of pushing back migrants by force. By 2022, Poland had finalized the construction of a state border barrier between the two countries. In the same year, a number of Home Army monuments in Belarus were purposely destroyed.

== Geography ==
Belarus and Poland share a common border (~418 km long) which is the European Union external border, which also splits the primeval Białowieża Forest between Belarusian and Polish national parks.

Poles make up 3.9% of the population of Belarus according to the 1999 Belarus Census. There were 48,700 Belarusians in Poland according to the Polish census of 2002. Both minorities represent autochthonous populations of the region and are officially recognised by their host governments.

== Modern history ==
=== 2020 Belarusian protests ===
Amidst the 2020 Belarusian protests and Polish and Western calls for a renewed election, declaring the 2020 Belarusian presidential election invalid, Belarus deployed troops near Eastern Poland.

After the forceful suppression of Belarusian protests, the main opposition challenger Sviatlana Tsikhanouskaya fled the country to Poland, then to Lithuania. The Polish government has allotted a villa in the Praga-Południe district of Warsaw for 10 years to be used by the Belarusian opposition. It has also given refuge to opposition leader Valery Tsepkalo. Polish Prime minister Mateusz Morawiecki has promised to provide help to the opposition, which angered president Lukashenko and his allies. Poland is also hosting the Belarusian news channel Nexta, which has played a key part in organizing the protests. The Morawiecki government has promised to give 11 million euros to Belarusian civil society and independent media.

=== Belarus–EU border crisis ===
In January 2022 Poland started building a 5.5-meter (18 foot) high steel wall topped with barbed wire along the 187 km Belarus border, which was completed in June 2022.

=== Fallout of the 2022 Russian invasion of Ukraine ===
On 6 July 2022, scant months after the 2022 Russian invasion of Ukraine caused the announcement by the Morawiecki government of a major increase in funding for the Polish armed forces, the General Staff of the Armed Forces of Belarus noticed that Poland "has already repeatedly displayed its imperial ambitions and, with a support from the [US] White House, positions itself as a leader, not only in Eastern, but in Central Europe as well." Major-General Ruslan Kosygin continued: "The territory of Poland, as well as the Baltic countries, is turning into a polygon, where the USA plans to unleash another bloody conflict in Europe against the Russian Federation and its allies." He was concerned about "attempts by individual Polish politicians to initiate the return of the so-called Polish ancestral lands, which means the western regions of Ukraine and Belarus."

In 2022, Polish places of national remembrance were devastated or destroyed in Belarus, incl. Home Army monument in Stryjewka, Home Army soldiers' quarters in Mikulishki, cemetery in Surkanty, Home Army graves and commemorations in Bogdany (Yewlashy), Bobravichy, Vialikija Yodkavichy, Vawkavysk, Dyndylishki, Kachychy, Iwye, Pieskawtsy, Ashmyany and Plebanishki.

On 10 October 2022, the Polish government recommended Polish citizens leave Belarus with available commercial and private means as the relationship between the two countries has become increasingly tense. The Polish government also claims the Polish minority in Belarus is experiencing increasing repression from the state, including the imprisonment of some community leaders.

==== Violation of Polish airspace ====
On 1 August 2023, a Belarusian Mi-8 and an Mi-24 helicopter, reportedly flew just over 3 kilometers over Polish territory, reaching the town of Białowieża before turning back and flying over the village of Grudki. Initially, the Polish Ministry of National Defence denied the claims. A few days before this, Poland stated that they'd send more troops to the border, after Belarus taunted Poland over the Russian Wagner Group.

=== 2026 Prisoner Exchange ===
The exchange took place on 28 April 2026.

==== Released by Belarus ====
Prisoners previously held by Belarus
Name	Nationality	Held since	Occupation	Charges	Prison sentence
Andrzej Poczobut	Belarus	2021	Journalist and Activist of Poles in Belarus	inciting hatred on national, religious and social grounds, and threatening Belarus' national security	8 years
Grzegorz Gaweł OCarm	Poland	4 September 2025	Carmelite Monk	Unspecified activities	Did not receive a final sentence
Unnamed	Belarus	Unknown	Presumably assisted Polish services	Unknown	Unknown
Unnamed	Moldova	Unknown	Intelligence Services Employee	Unknown	Unknown
Unnamed	Moldova	Unknown	Intelligence Services Employee	Unknown	Unknown

==== Released by Poland ====
Prisoners previously held by Belarus
Name	Nationality	Held since	Occupation	Charges	Prison sentence
Alexander Butyagin	Russia	4 December 2025	Archaeologist	illegal search work at an archaeological heritage site; destruction, ruin or damage to cultural heritage objects	Did not receive a final sentence
Nina Popova	Russia	October 2025	Unknown	Bribery	1 year
Alexandru Bălan	Moldova	April 2026	Intelligence Officer	Treason	1.5 years
Unnamed	Russia	Unknown	Unknown	Unknown	Unknown

== Trade ==
In 2021 Poland exported $1.86 billion of goods to Belarus, the main export being locomotive parts, with Belarus exporting $2.00 billion of goods to Poland, the top export being rail transport. Between 1995 and 2021 Polish exports have risen by an average of 8.62% p.a. with Belarus increasing at 8.92% p.a.

== Resident diplomatic missions ==
- Belarus has an embassy in Warsaw, a consulate-general in Białystok and a consulate in Biała Podlaska.
- Poland has an embassy in Minsk and consulates-general in Brest and in Grodno.
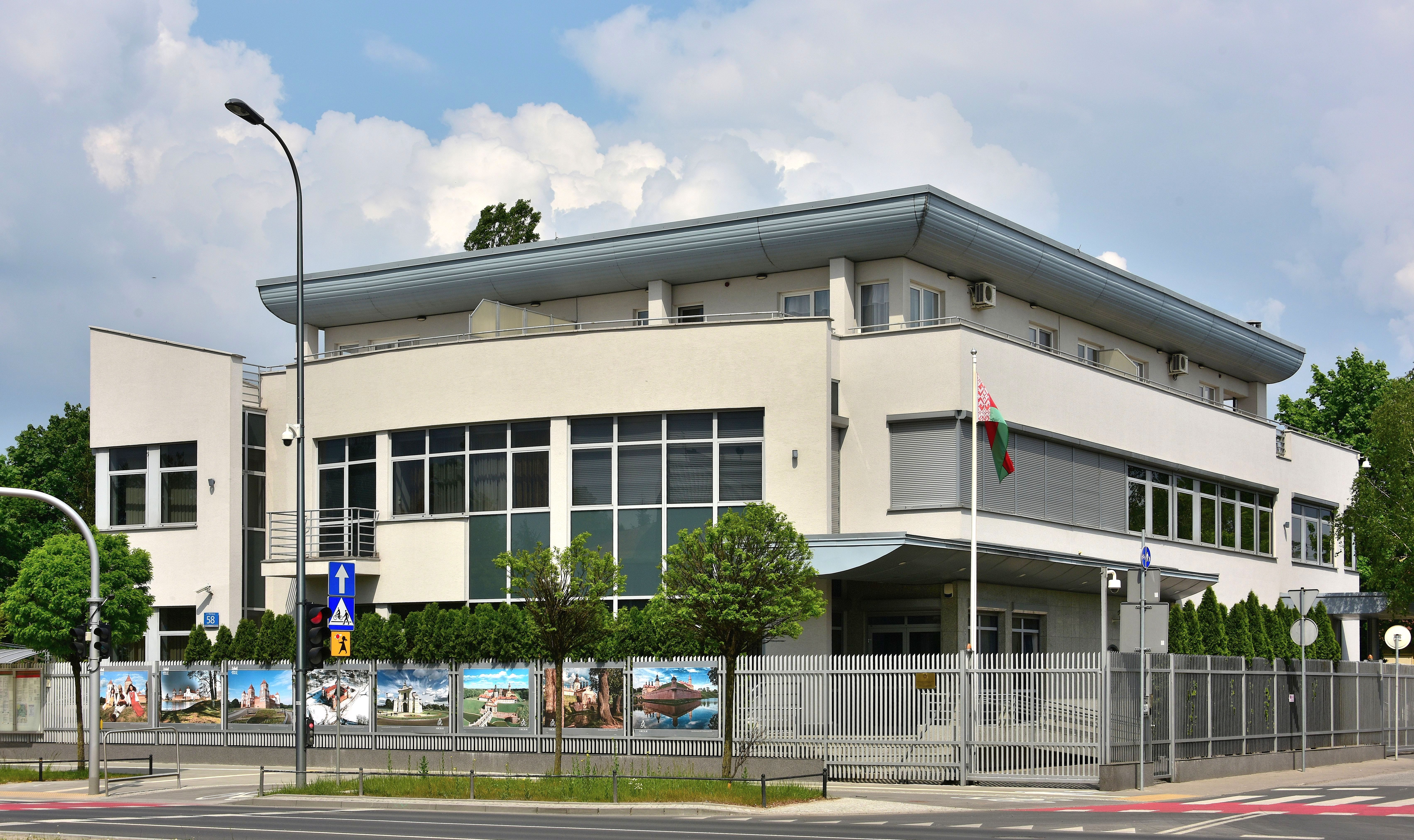
Embassy of Belarus in Warsaw

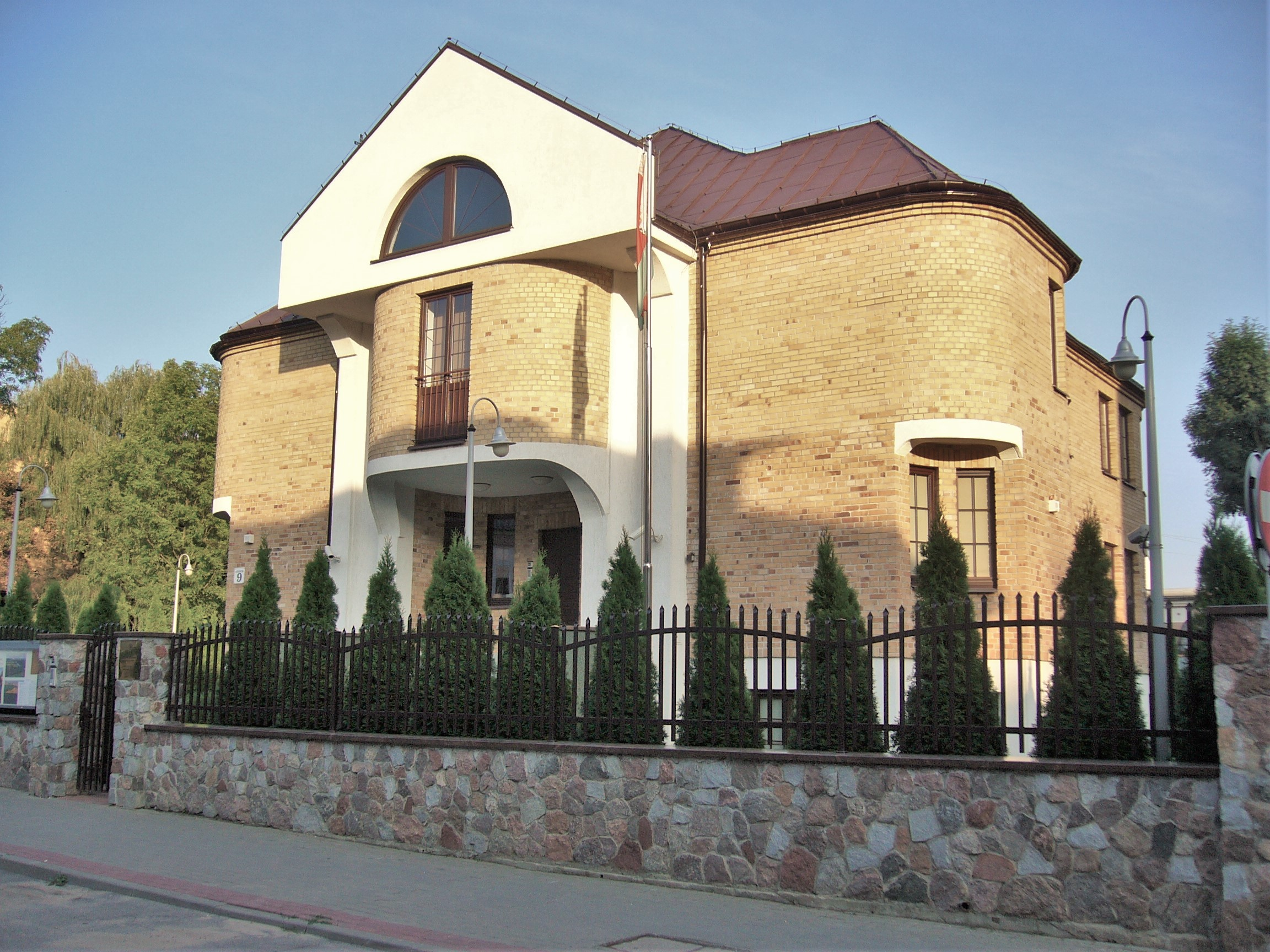
Consulate-General of Belarus in Białystok

== See also ==
- 2021 Belarus–European Union border crisis
- Belarus–Poland border
- Foreign relations of Belarus
- Foreign relations of Poland
- Belarusians in Poland
- Poles in Belarus
