= Kruczkowski =

Kruczkowski (feminine: Kruczkowska) is a Polish surname, a derivation from the nickname kruczek meaning "little raven", applied to different things. Similar surnames: Kruczyk, Kruczek, Kruczyński/Kruczynski Kruk, Krukowicz, Krukiewicz, Krukowski

- Leon Kruczkowski
- Tadeusz Kruczkowski
