= Kruczek =

Kruczek is a Polish surname, a derivation from the nickname meaning "little raven", applied to different things. Similar surnames: Kruczyk, Kruczkowski, Kruczyński/Kruczynski Kruk, Krukowicz, Krukiewicz, Krukowski

- Bartłomiej Kruczek
- Łukasz Kruczek
- Mike Kruczek
- Witold Kruczek
