= Tadeusz Kruczkowski =

Polish-Belarusian historian

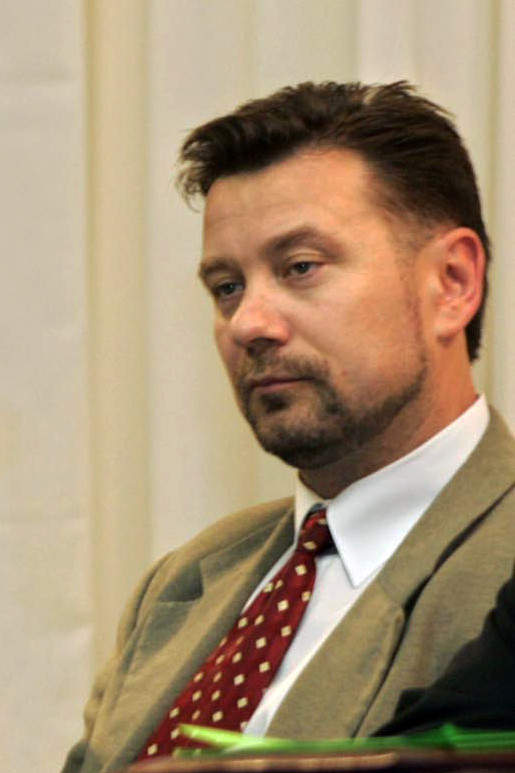
- Kruczkowski
- Born: 5 January 1961 (age 64); Jaskołda near Vyalikaya Byerastavitsa

Tadeusz Kruczkowski (Belarusian: Тадэвуш Кручкоўскі; born 5 January 1961) is a Polish-Belarusian historian and activist. He was the president of the Union of Poles in Belarus from 2000 to 2005. He is a lecturer at the Yanka Kupala State University of Grodno.

Political offices
Preceded by Tadeusz Gawin	President of the Union of Poles in Belarus; 2000 - 2005	Succeeded by Andżelika Borys
