= Andżelika Borys =

Polish activist

- Анжаліка Борыс
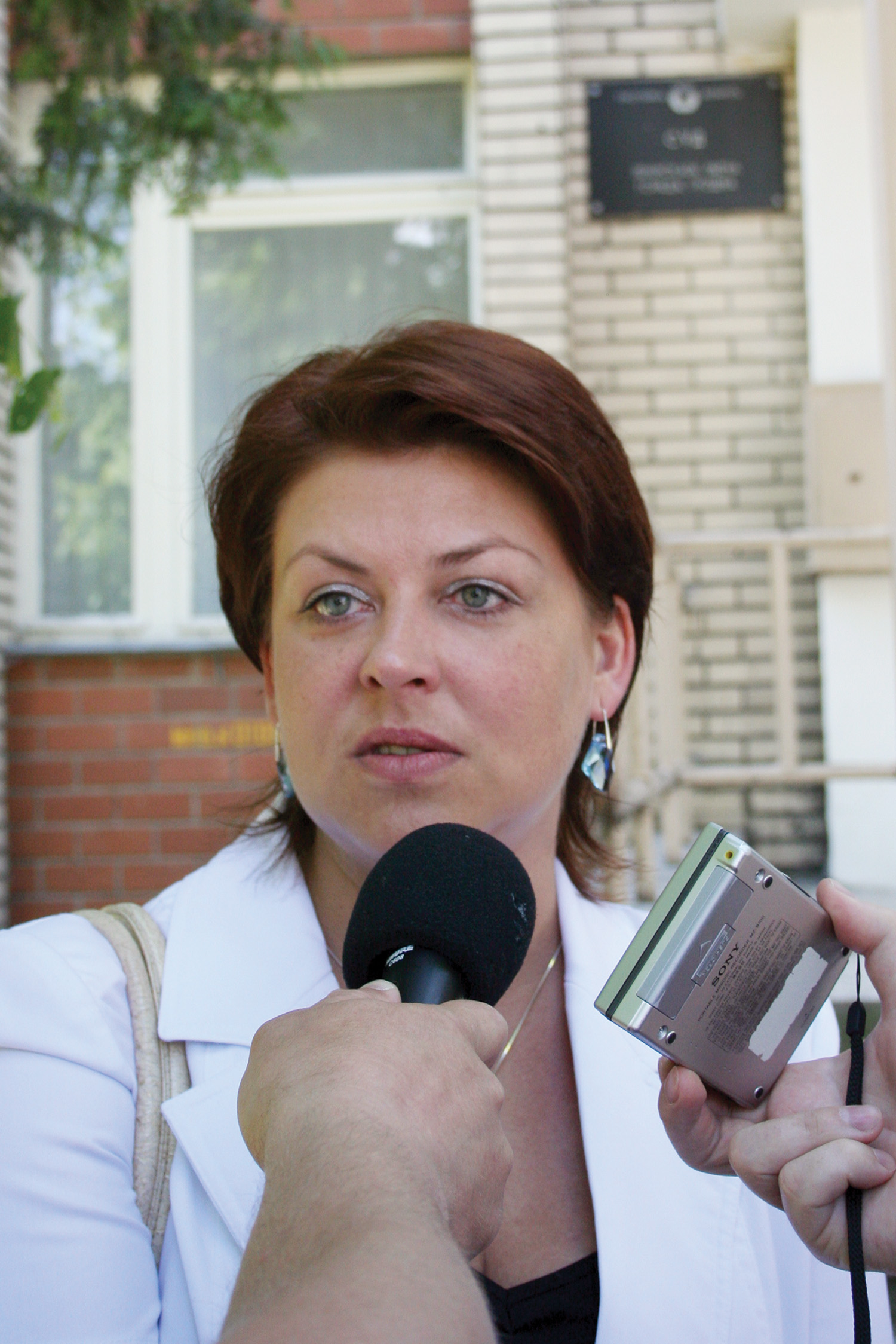
- Borys in 2008

Chairman of the Union of Poles in Belarus (Note: Leader of independent and internationally recognized authorities disputed by pro-regime chairmen since 2005)
- Incumbent
- Assumed office 10 December 2016
- Deputy: Andrzej Poczobut
- Preceded by: Mieczysław Jaśkiewicz
- In office 2005 – 15 December 2010
- Preceded by: Tadeusz Kruczkowski
- Succeeded by: Anżelika Orechwo

Personal details
- Born: 18 October 1973 (age 53) Grodno, Byelorussian SSR, Soviet Union

Andżelika Czesławowna Borys (Belarusian: Анжаліка Борыс; born 18 October 1973) is a Polish minority activist in Belarus and an opposition figure. She was born in Grabyani – Hrodna district. She is the leader of the Union of Poles in Belarus.

== Biography ==
Borys competed in bowling in the 2011 Summer World Polonia Games in Wrocław.

Borys was detained by the Belarusian authorities on March 23, 2021. It was reported that Borys was a suspect in a criminal case under Part 3 of Art. 130 of the Criminal Code for "incitement to hatred" and "rehabilitation of Nazism". The Viasna Human Rights Centre recognized her as a political prisoner. In March 2022, she was released from custody; in April 2023, the criminal case against Borys was closed.

== Notes ==
Political offices
Preceded by Tadeusz Kruczkowski; Mieczysław Jaśkiewicz	Chairman of the Union of Poles in Belarus; 2005–2010 2016–present	Succeeded by Anżelika Orechwo
