= Kruk =

Kruk may refer to:

== People ==
- Kruk (surname)
- Kruk, a nickname of Mike Krukow's

== Other uses ==
- Kruk, a fictional legal concept of dwarfs in Discworld
- PZL-106 Kruk, a Polish aircraft
- Kruk, the native Polish title of the 2018 television series Raven
