= Tadeusz Gawin =

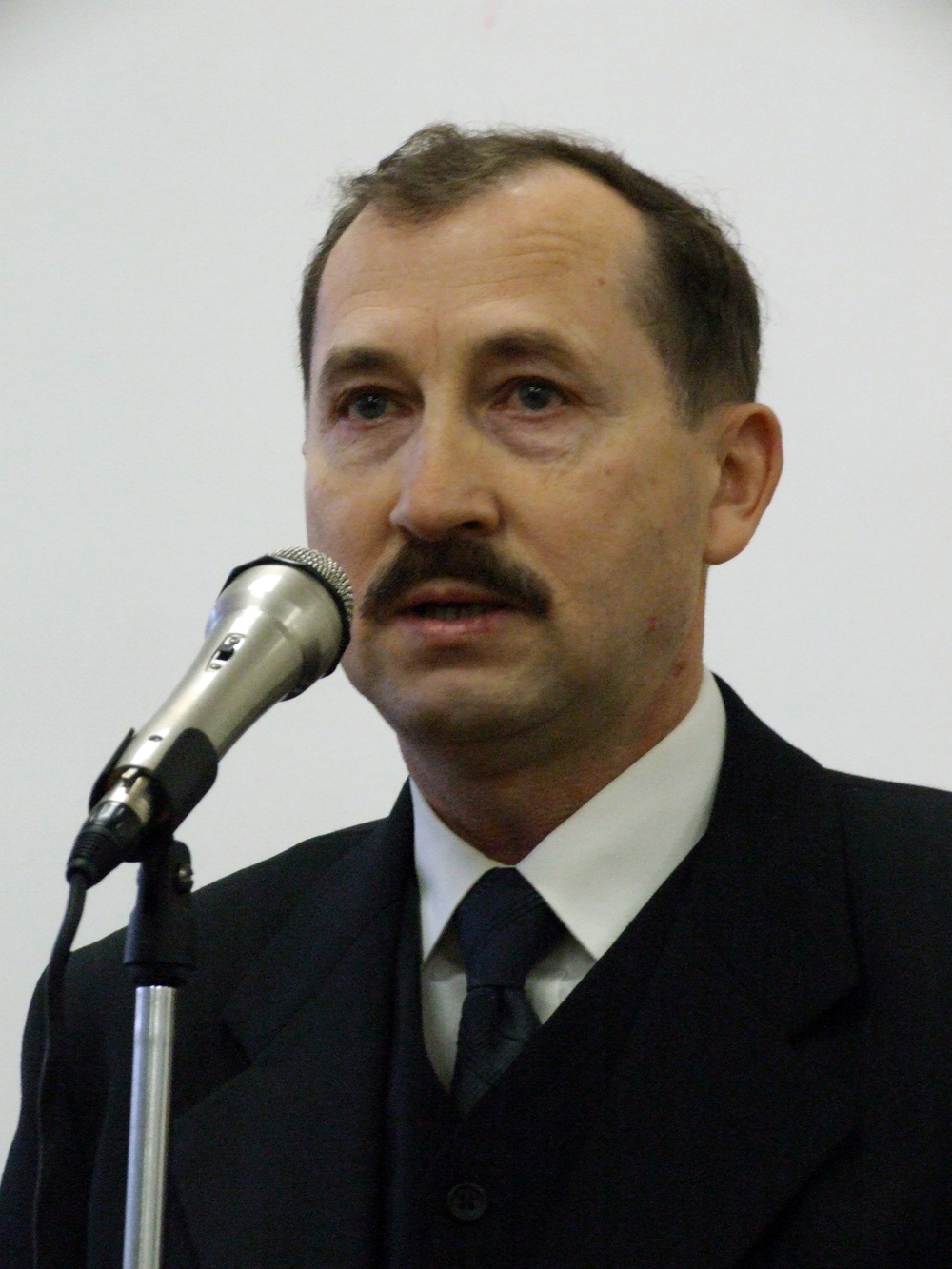
Tadeusz Gawin

Tadeusz Gawin (Belarusian: Тадэвуш Гавін; born 3 July 1951 in Łosośno near Hrodna) is a Belarusian Polish journalist and activist. He is co-founder and first President of the Union of Poles in Belarus from 1990 to 2000, now Honorary President of the UPB and activist of the democratic opposition in Belarus.

Political offices
Preceded by -	President of the Union of Poles in Belarus; 1990 - 2000	Succeeded by Tadeusz Kruczkowski
