= Vyalikiya Yodkavichy =

Village in Grodno Region, Belarus

Vyalikiya Yodkavichy Вялікія Ёдкавічы (Belarusian) Великие Ёдковичи (Russian)
- Village
- Location within Belarus
- Coordinates: 53°24′49″N 24°00′09″E
- Country: Belarus
- Region: Grodno Region
- District: Byerastavitsa District
- Time zone: UTC+3 (MSK)

Vyalikiya Yodkavichy (Belarusian: Вялікія Ёдкавічы, romanized: Vialikija Jodkavičy; Russian: Великие Ёдковичи, romanized: Velikiye Yodkovichi; Polish: Jodkiewicze Wielkie) is a village in Byerastavitsa District, Grodno Region, in western Belarus. It is part of Eysmanty selsoviet.

== History ==
It is a former okolica szlachecka of the Polish–Lithuanian Commonwealth.

In the interwar period, the village was situated in the Second Polish Republic, in Białystok Voivodeship, in Grodno County, in Wielkie Ejsymonty Commune. According to the 1921 census, the population was 95.2% Polish, 3.3% Belarusian, and 1.1% Jewish.

After the Soviet invasion of Poland in 1939, the village became part of the Byelorussian Soviet Socialist Republic. In the years 1941–1944, it was under German occupation. The village again became part of the Byelorussian SSR following the end of the war. From 1991, it became part of the independent Republic of Belarus.

In the field in front of the brick chapel, there are the graves of two soldiers of the Polish Army who died in the Polish–Soviet War and the grave of the Home Army soldier Adam Pacenko, who died on July 15, 1944. They were founded in 1989. In June 2022, the tombstones were devastated by unknown perpetrators. The tombstones were removed and the remains of the soldiers dug up.
