= Krukowicz =

Krukowicz is a Polish surname, a patronymic derivation from the nickname Kruk. Similar surnames: Kruczek, Krukiewicz, Krukowski

- Emil Krukowicz-Przedrzymirski
- Henryk Krukowicz-Przedrzymirski
