= Pyeskawtsy =

Pyeskawtsy (Belarusian: Пескаўцы) or Peskovtsy (Russian: Песковцы) may refer to the following places in Belarus:

- Pyeskawtsy, Lida District, an agrotown in Lida District, Grodno Region
- Pyeskawtsy, Voranava District, a village in Voranava District, Grodno Region
