= Andrzej Poczobut =

Polish and Belarusian political prisoner

- Андрэй Пачобут
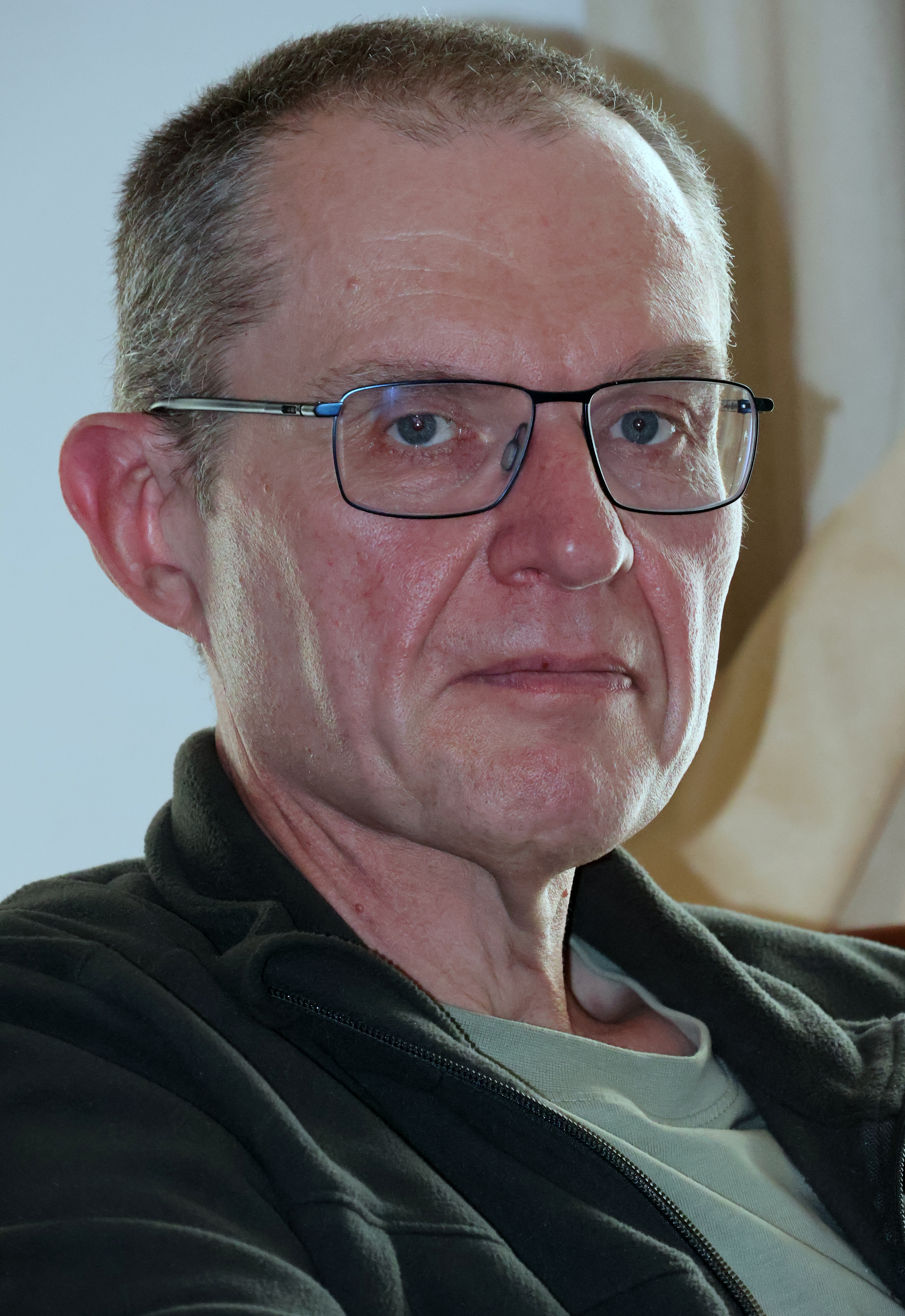
- Poczobut in Gdansk, Poland (8 June 2026)

Deputy Chairman of the Union of Poles in Belarus
- Incumbent
- Assumed office 10 December 2016
- Chairman: Andżelika Borys

Personal details
- Born: 16 April 1973 (age 53) Vyalikaya Byerastavitsa, Byelorussian SSR, Soviet Union
- Spouse: Aksana Poczobut
- Children: Jana Poczobut (daughter); Jarosław Poczobut (son)
- Education: Yanka Kupala State University of Grodno
- Occupation: Journalist, dissident

Andrzej Poczobut (Belarusian: Андрэй (Note: Also spelled Andžej (Belarusian: Анджэй).) Пачобут, romanized: Andrej Pačobut; born 16 April 1973) is a Belarusian journalist, opposition figure, activist of the Polish minority in Belarus and political prisoner who received a Sakharov Prize in 2025 for opposing the authoritarian regime of Alexander Lukashenko.

A correspondent for the Polish newspaper Gazeta Wyborcza, Poczobut has been arrested more than a dozen times by the government of Belarus. In 2011, he was sentenced to a fine and fifteen days in prison for "participation in the unsanctioned protest rally" following the 2010 presidential election. In 2011 and 2012, he was arrested and detained for allegedly libeling President Alexander Lukashenko in his reports. The charges against Poczobut received international condemnation, with groups including the European Parliament, Reporters Without Borders, and Amnesty International issuing statements in his support. He was arrested again in 2021 and remained in prison under brutal conditions until he was released on 28 April 2026, in a prisoner exchange between Poland and Belarus. He has been described as a political prisoner.

== Background ==
He worked as a journalist for several Belarusian media– including Narodnaja Vola, Głos znad Niemna and Magazyn Polski. For many years, Poczobut resided in Hrodna and worked as a correspondent for the Polish newspaper Gazeta Wyborcza, writing about local issues, needs and achievements. Andrzej's main passion has always been history, in particular the World War II and the post-war Polish resistance movement. He referred to the Soviet invasion of Poland in 1939 as an act of aggression. This statement was cited as evidence of Poczobut's guilt at the 2023 trial on charges of damaging the national security of Belarus and "sowing discord".

Poczobut was one of the leaders of the Union of Poles in Belarus. He is an author of the book System Belarus.

== Protest arrest ==
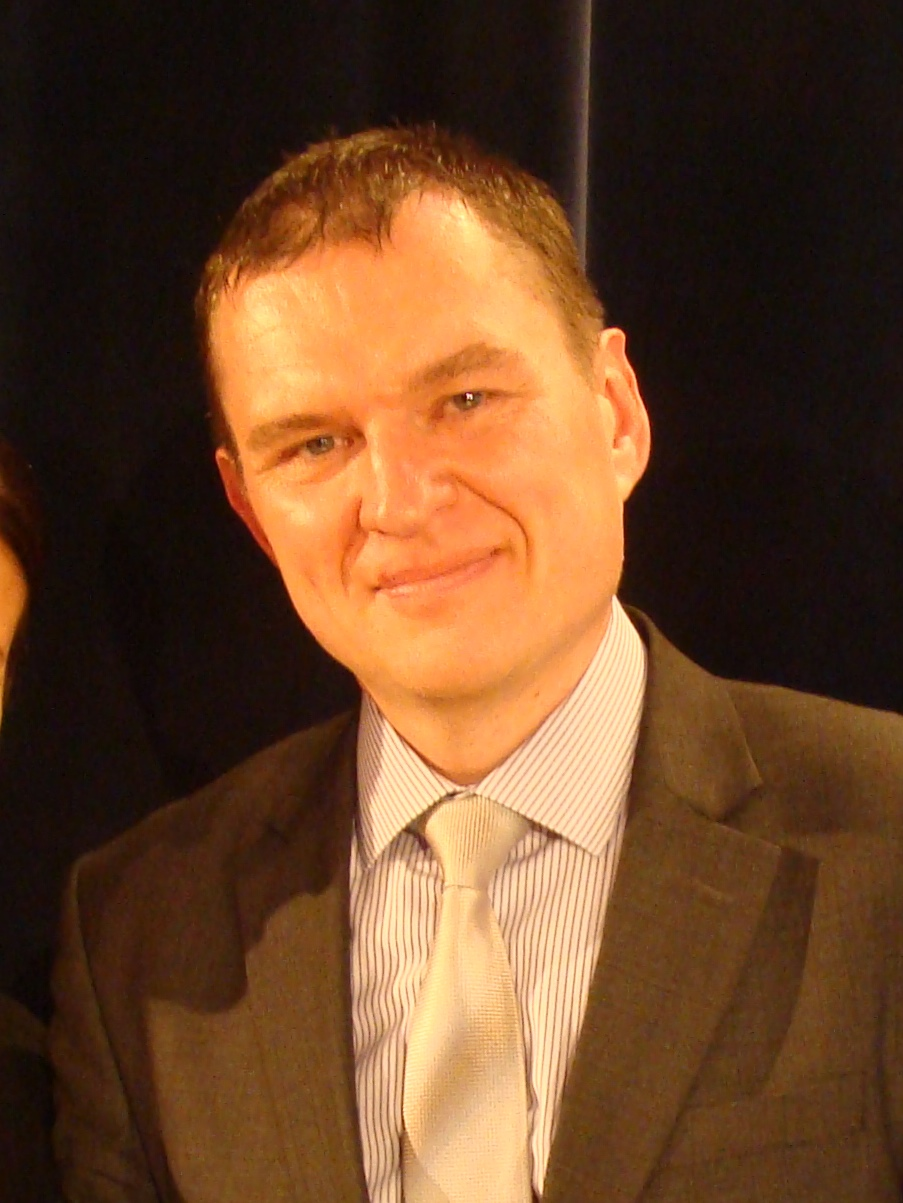
Poczobut in 2013

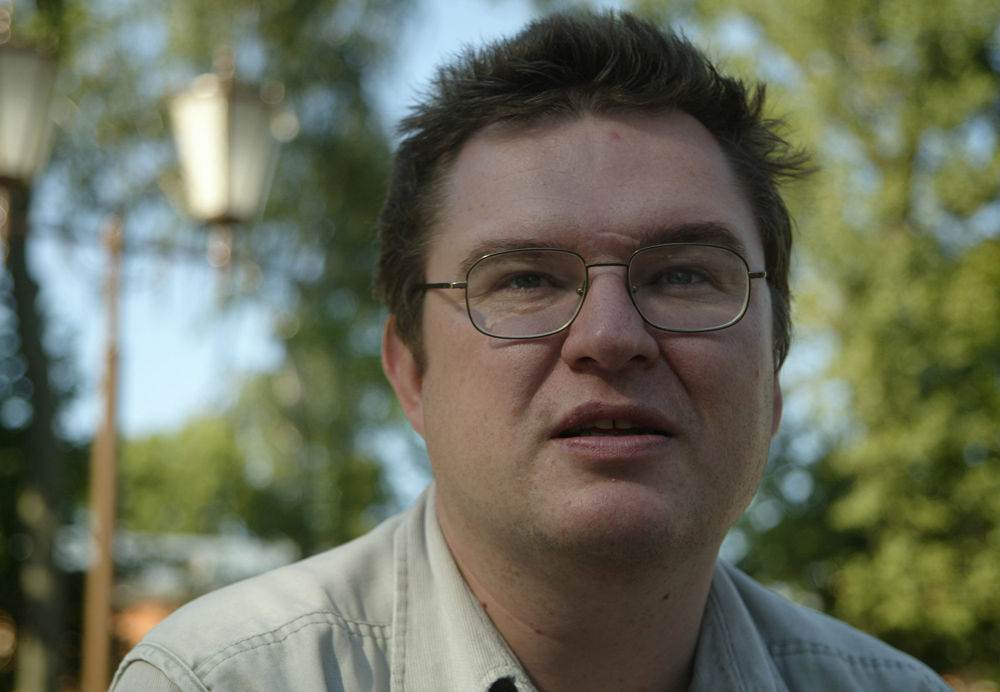
Poczobut in 2005

On 19 December 2010, Belarus held a disputed presidential election in which President Alexander Lukashenko was elected to a fourth term, which resulted in widespread opposition protests. On 12 January 2011, the State Security Committee of the Republic of Belarus (KGB) arrested Poczobut for "participation in the unsanctioned protest rally". He was fined 1.75 million Belarusian rubles (US$580) the following day. The KGB also raided his house and confiscated his computer and documents. Andrzej argued that he was acting as a journalist during the rally. On 11 February, he was tried a second time for the same charge, and given a sentence of fifteen days in prison.

Jerzy Buzek, president of the European Parliament, demanded his release. The US-based Committee to Protect Journalists also protested on his behalf, stating that the organization was "outraged that Andrzej Poczobut was not only convicted on a trumped-up charge but that he has now been given jail time after already receiving a sentence of a fine".

His accreditation from the Belarus Ministry of Foreign Affairs was revoked. He argued that his work is protected by his constitutional rights.

== 2011–2012 libel charges ==
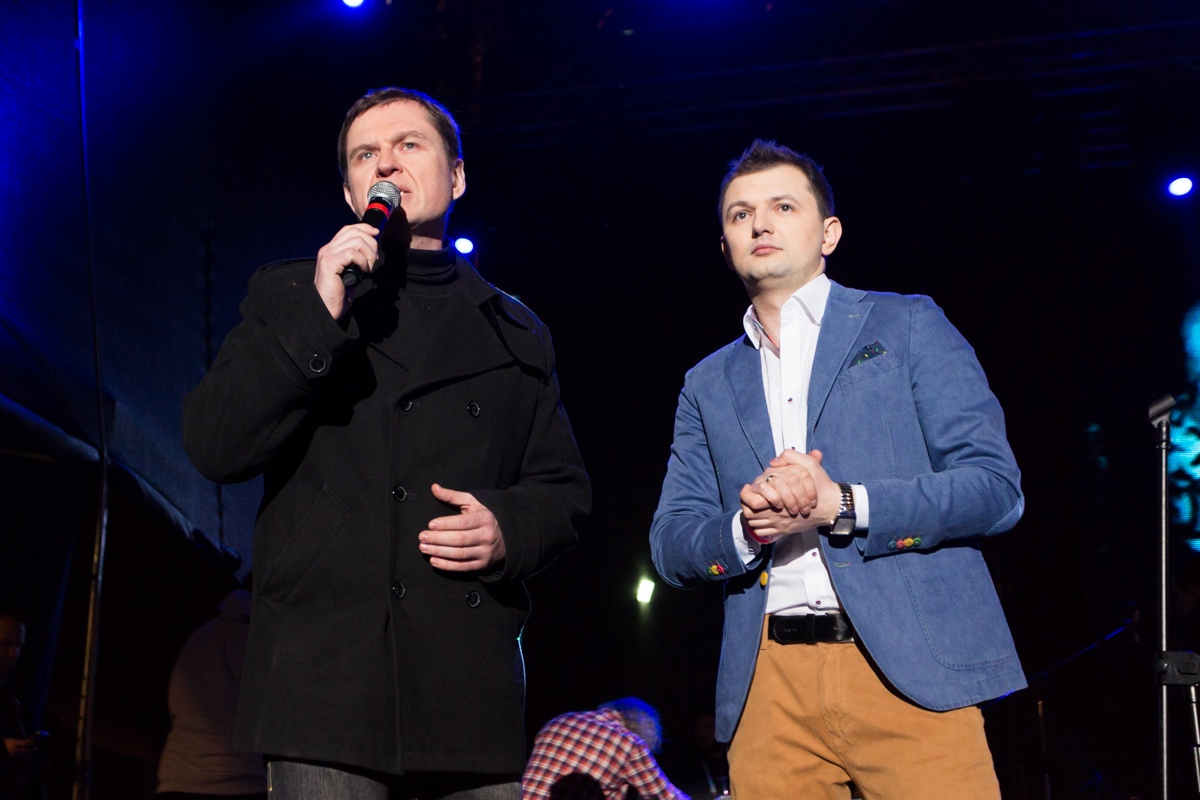
Poczobut on Solidarity with Belarus concert in Warsaw, April 2014

Poczobut was arrested again on 6 April 2011, this time on libel charges. The charges stemmed from ten reports about Lukashenko and 2010 presidential election that Poczobut had published on his blog, in Gazeta Wyborcza, and on the website Belarusian Partisan.

The Union of Poles in Belarus campaigned on Poczobut's behalf, calling for his release. Another Polish journalist, Ihar Bantsar, was sentenced to five days in prison for covering the trial. According to Reporters Without Borders (RSF), reporters for Reuters and the Associated Press were assaulted by plainclothes police officers when attempting to photograph Poczobut entering the courthouse.

On 5 July 2011, he was found guilty and given a suspended three-year prison sentence. Poczobut attributed the suspension of his sentence to international pressure, including a statement on his behalf by the EU. Amnesty International also denounced Poczobut's prosecution and named him a prisoner of conscience. RSF called for his conviction to be overturned, calling him "a closely-watched victim of President Lukashenko's persecution of journalists". Poczobut appealed the verdict, but lost the appeal on 20 September.

In November 2011, the Polish radio station Radio ZET awarded him its Andrzej Wojciechowski prize for his journalism. Because Poczobut was forbidden to leave Belarus, his wife accepted the award on his behalf.

On 21 June 2012, he was arrested in Grodno on another charge of libel against the president, this time for a story criticizing the government's handling of the 2011 Minsk Metro bombing for the independent news site Charter 97. The charge carried a maximum sentence of five years' imprisonment. Poczobut was released on bail after a week in detention, but was told a trial against him would still be forthcoming.

The European Parliament adopted a resolution urging that the charges against Poczobut be dropped. Polish Prime Minister Donald Tusk summoned the Belarusian ambassador to object to the libel case, and stated that he also had the backing of the Czech Republic, Slovakia, and Hungary. RSF again protested the charges, describing Poczobut as "hounded because of his determination to work as an independent reporter", and Amnesty International called for the charges to be dropped. PEN American Center also appealed on his behalf, urging the Belarusian government "to drop all charges against Poczobut immediately, and to uphold their obligations to protect freedom of expression for all citizens as guaranteed by Article 19 of the International Covenant on Civil and Political Rights."

== 2021 extremism charges ==
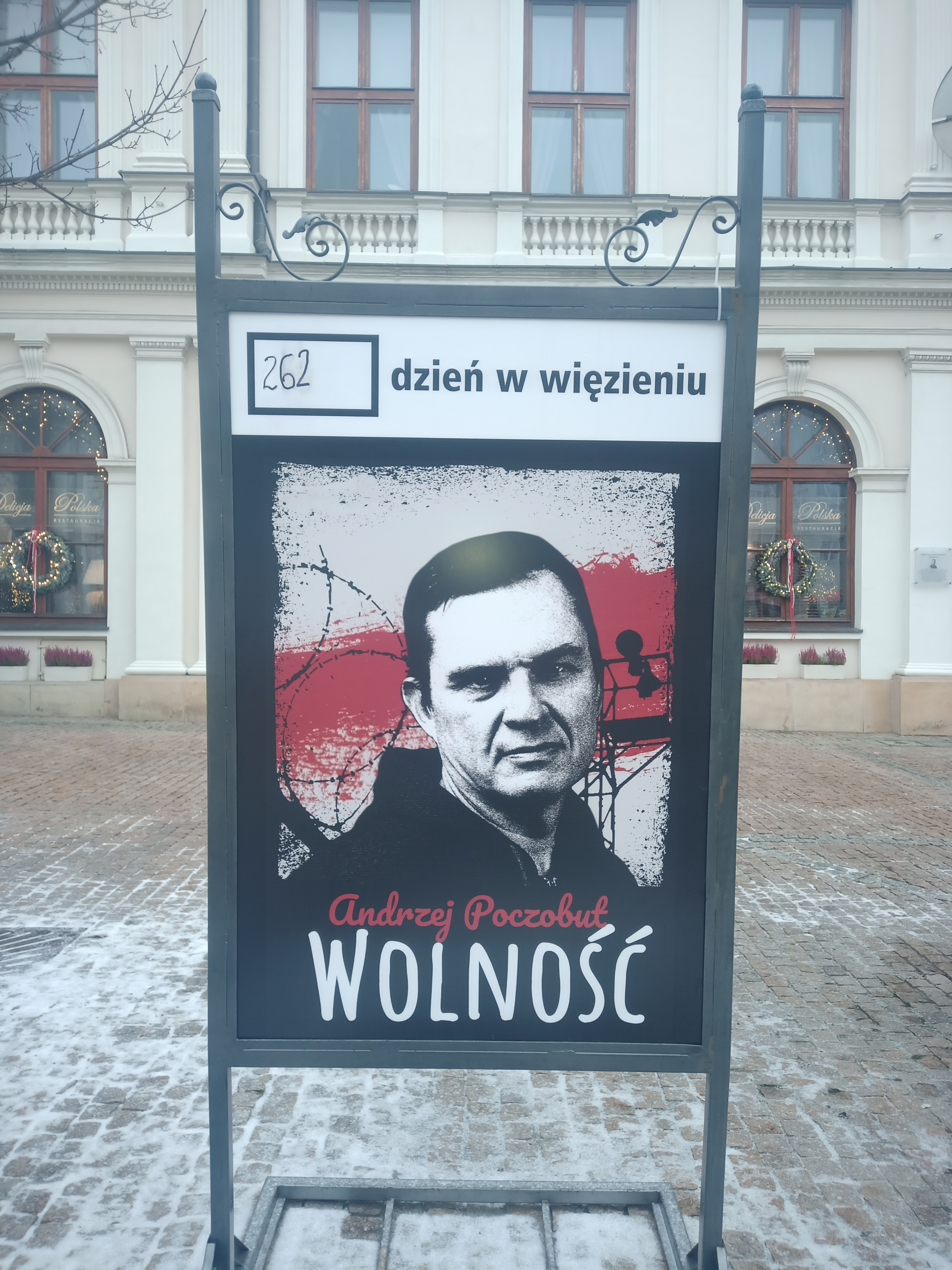
Poster of Andrzej Poczobut in Poland

As a part of the crackdown on the Union of Poles in Belarus, he was arrested again on 25 March 2021. Security forces searched his apartment, seized all computer equipment and confiscated all the documents. High Representative of the Union for Foreign Affairs and Security Policy Josep Borrell condemned the arrest. In February 2023, he was sentenced to eight years in labour camp. He was then released on 28 April 2026 as part of Belarus' prisoner exchange with Poland. He returned to Belarus on 8 September 2026.

== Awards and recognition ==
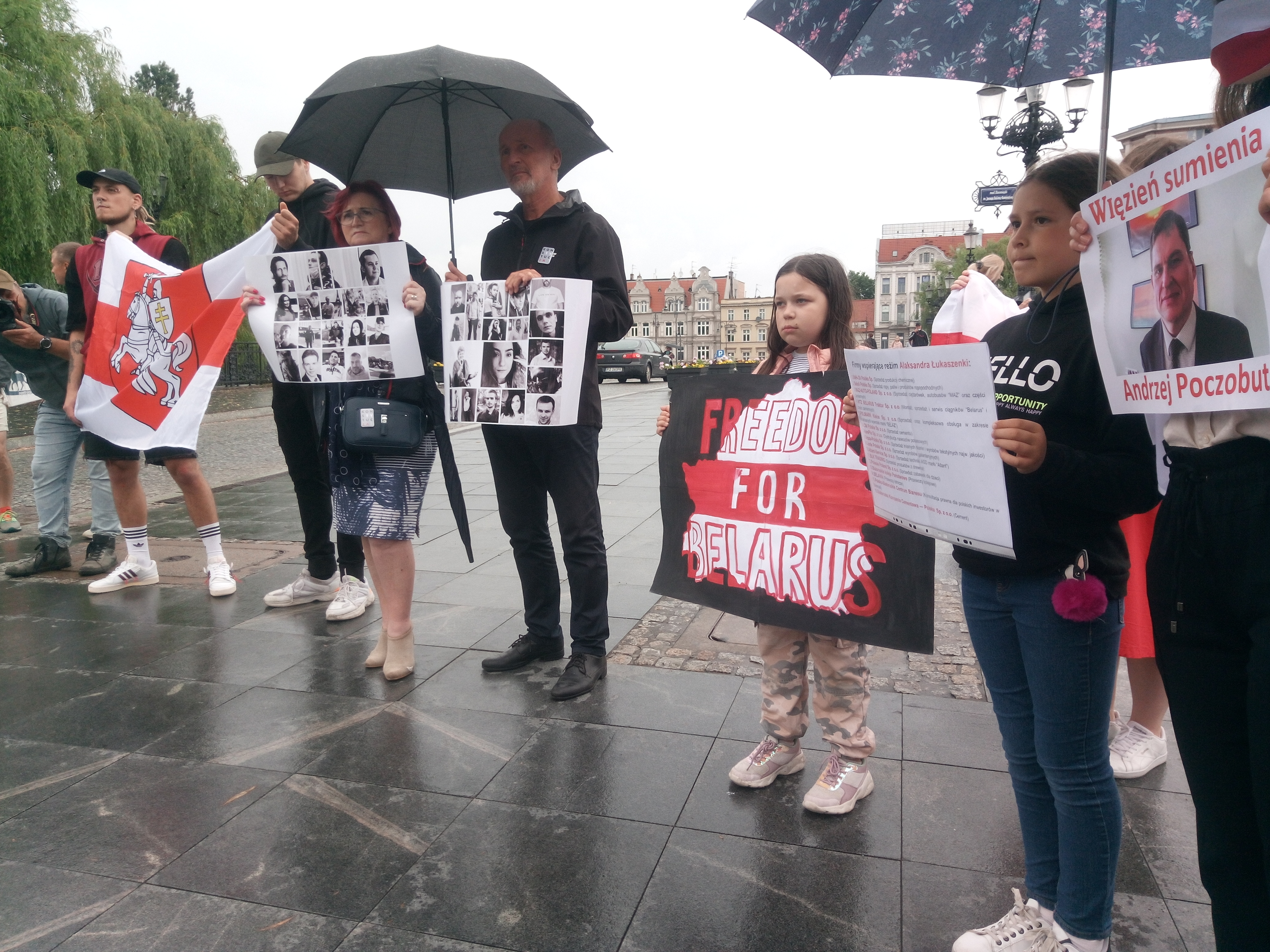
Protests calling for release of Belarusian dissidents, including Poczobut in 2021

In 2011 and 2021, Poczobut was awarded the title of Journalist of the Year at the Polish journalistic contest Grand Press.

In April 2023, together with Mortaza Behboudi, he was awarded the IAPC Freedom of Speech Award.

In March 2024, Newsweek Poland named Poczobut The Figure of the Decade.

In October 2025, Poczobut shared the annual EU award Sakharov Prize with Georgian jailed journalist Mzia Amaglobeli, which was received on his behalf by his daughter Jana on 16 December 2025.

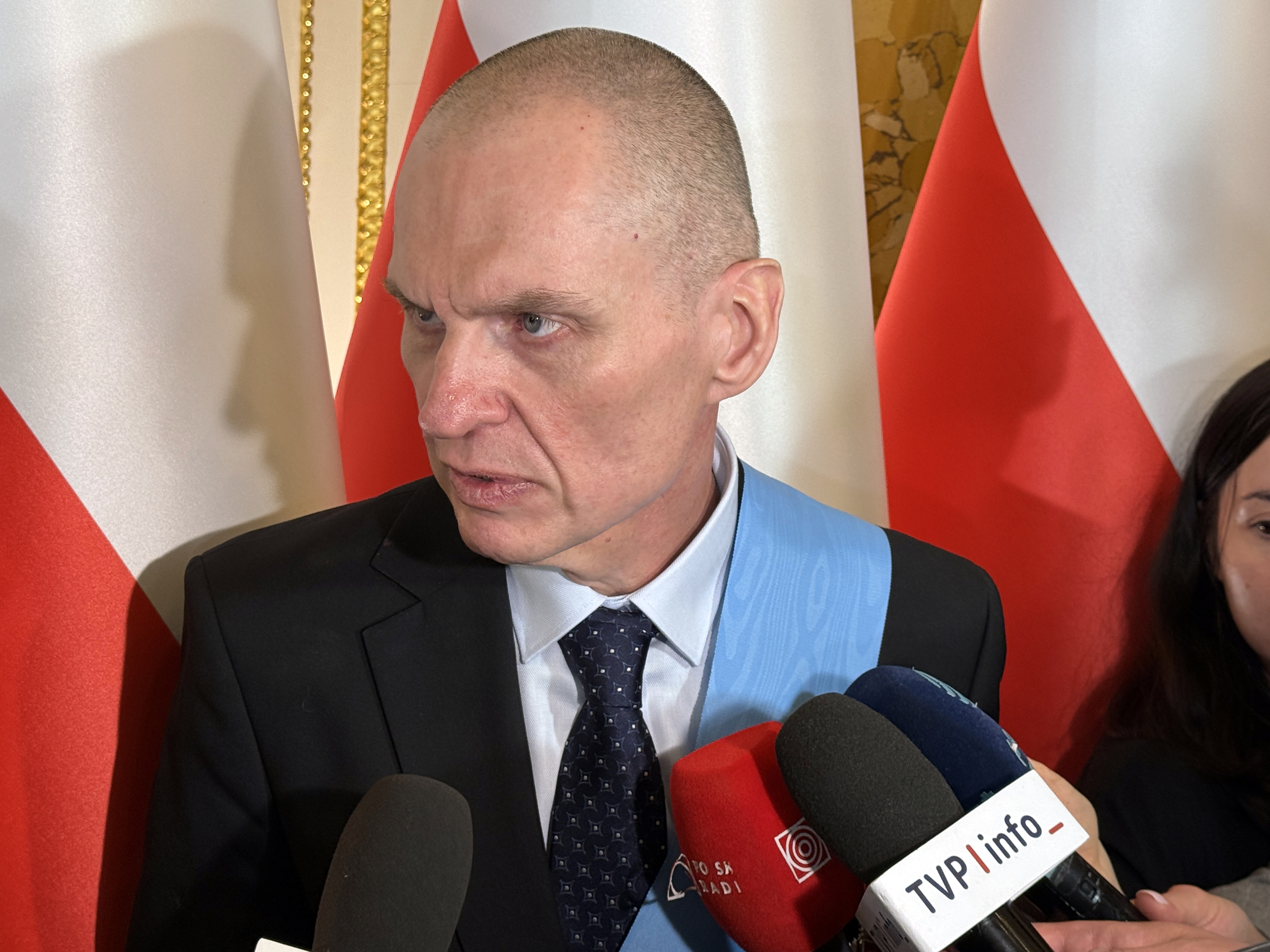
Poczobut after being decorated with the Order of the White Eagle, 3 May 2026

On 11 November 2025, during the Polish Independence Day, President of Poland Karol Nawrocki awarded Poczobut in absentia with an Order of the White Eagle for "actively and decisively confronting the manifestations of resurgent neo-totalitarian regimes". On 3 May 2026, during the festivities of 3 May Constitution Day, Poczobut accepted the order in person.

== Personal life ==
Poczobut was born on 16 April 1973 in Vyalikaya Byerastavitsa. He is married to Aksana Poczobut. He has a daughter Jana (born c. 2001) and a son Jarosław (born February 2011).

Poczobut is a Candidate Master of Sports in chess and an amateur musician, co-founder of the Deviation punk-rock band.

== See also ==
- Aleksandr Otroschenkov
- Censorship in Belarus
- Media of Belarus
