= Józef Kowalewski =

Polish orientalist (1801–1878)

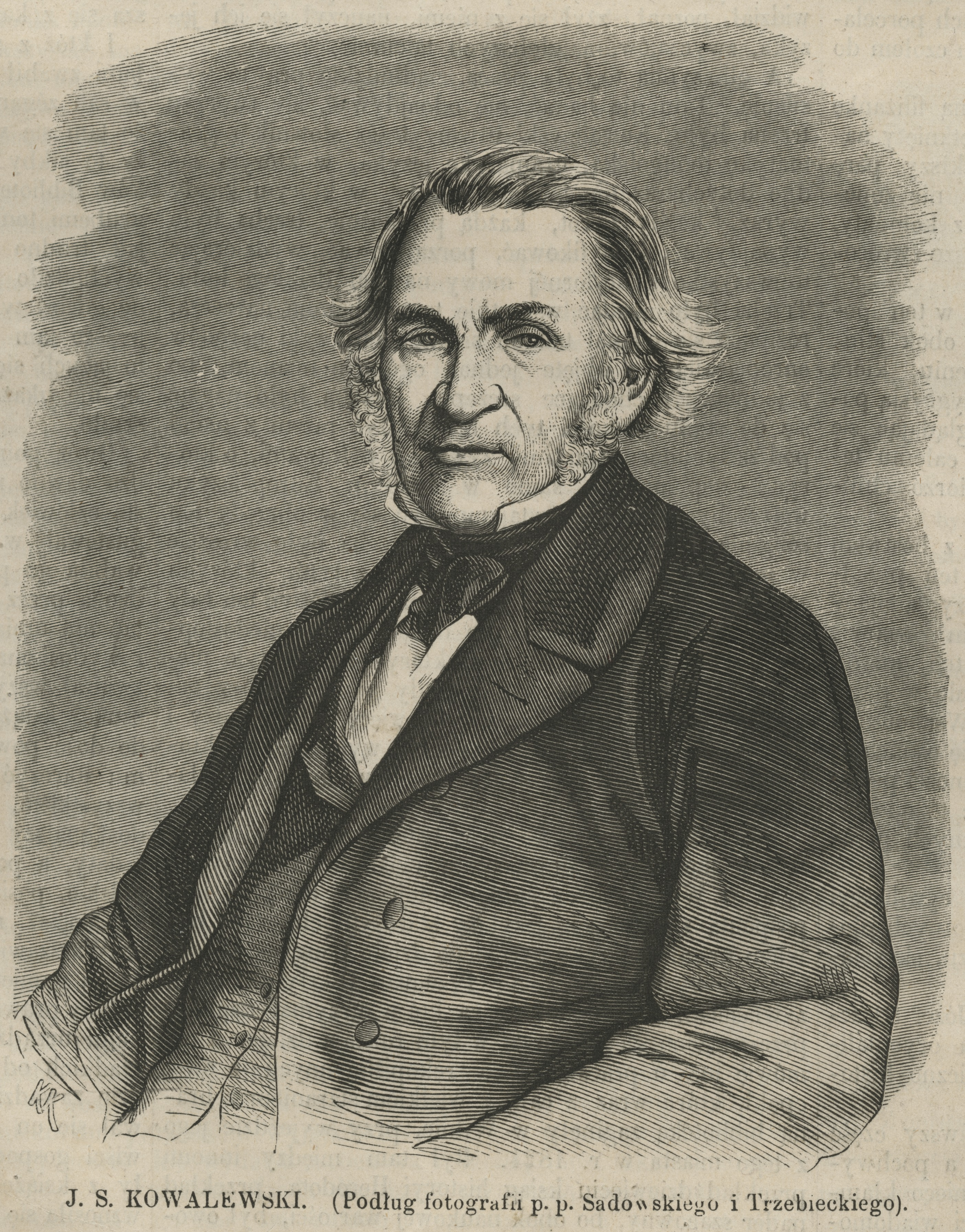
- Born: Józef Szczepan Kowalewski c. 1800; Bolshaya Berestovitsa, Grodno Governorate, Russian Empire
- Died: November 7, 1878 (aged 77); Warsaw, Congress Poland
- Children: four, including Nikolay and Pavel

Academic background
- Education: Imperial Kazan University

Józef Kowalewski (Russian: Иосиф Михайлович Ковалевский, romanized: Iosif Mikhaylovich Kovalevsky; 9 January 1801 – 7 November 1878) was a Polish orientalist. He was the founder of the Philomatic Association.

In 1824, he was convicted by the Russian authorities for pro-independence Polish activity and exiled into Russia. He was allowed to study at the Kazan University, where he studied Mongolia, particularly the Mongolian language and Tibetan Buddhism. In 1833, he founded the Department of Mongolian Studies at Kazan University – the first in Europe. In the years 1844–1849, he published his major work, a Mongolian–Russian–French dictionary. In 1862, he was allowed to return to Poland (then a part of the Russian Empire); he refused to support the January Uprising and did not oppose the Russification of Polish education, for which he became the dean of the Philological and Historical Faculty of the University of Warsaw.

== Early biography ==
Józef Szczepan Kowalewski was born in the family of a polonized uniate priest Mikhail Yuzefovich, apparently of Belarusian origin. However, in the opinion of E. Tulisov, it does not follow from this that the whole family adhered to the uniate church - Kowalewski himself remained a Roman Catholic until the end of his life. Probably, his mother - Agatha - was of Polish origin. In the family, in addition to Józef, there were three more brothers - Julian, Anthony and Theodosius, and four daughters - Anela, Constance, Teklya and Isabella. For a long time, the birthplace of the future orientalist was debatable. The reference books (including Polish publications of the 19th century) usually indicated the village of Vyalikaya Byerastavitsa, Grodno Governorate, on the territory of modern Belarus. However, from the correspondence of Kowalewski it follows that his family lived 40 km from Byerastavitsa, in Lewkowo - in the Polish Podlaskie Voivodeship. By 2018, archival documents were discovered, testifying to the whole uniate church dynasty of the Kowalewski, who by inheritance held the posts of priests in Lewkowo since 1706, while in the Vyalikaya Byerastavitsa church there was another dynasty (in the Commonwealth, the uniate priesthood constituted a closed social stratum, referring to the szlachta). After the Western Belorussian territories entered the Russian Empire, Kowalewski's uncle - Leon - failed to confirm his nobility, and was included in the clergy.

Kowalewski's father did not have a large income, but gave his sons a good education at home. This was favored by the fact that the uniate priest enjoyed traditional economic privileges, had a certain income from demands for correction, and could also keep tenants or serfs on his lands. According to tradition, dignity and service passed to one of the sons, others made a secular career, while daughters were married only to priests. Józef was sent quite early to the Svisloch gymnasium, which was under the care of the Vilnius University, where his brothers Julius and Theodosius were already studying. The gymnasium quickly gained a reputation as one of the best Polish educational institutions, its founder, Count W Tyszkiewicz, took care not only of organizing the educational process, but also of the gymnasium's leisure time, education was free, but the parents of the students contributed money to the maintenance of educators-supervisors, who were recruited from the students of the same gymnasium who completed the full course. There are certain discrepancies in the chronology of Józef Kowalewski's stay in the gymnasium. Polish and Belarusian sources call the initial year of his studies 1808 or 1809, there are doubts that in 1817 he completed the full course. Kowalewski showed considerable abilities in the humanities and wrote bucolics in the classical style. During the French invasion Svisloch was occupied by the Saxon units of Schwarzenberg, looters plundered the gymnasium, and Józef Kowalewski lost his chest along with all his poor property. The “loss” of one or two years is probably due to the fact that Józef served as a home tutor, which was widely practiced. He chose the university as the place of his further stay.

== Bibliography ==
- Kotwicz, W. (1948). Józef Kowalewski (1801—1878). Orientalista. Wrocław: Wrocł. Tow. Naukowe.
- Valeev R., Kulganek I., Tulisow J. (2009). "Professor O. M. Kowalewski - Mongolian studies scholar, traveller and enlightener: His biographical landmarks". Acta Orientalia Vilnensia. 10 (1–2) (Acta Orientalia Vilnensia ed.). Vilnius: 29–55. doi:10.15388/AOV.2009.3672. ISSN 1648-2662.
- Валеев, Р. М.; Ермакова, Т. В.; Кульганек, И. В. и др. (2004). Монголовед О. М. Ковалевский: биография и наследие (1801—1878). Казань: Алма-Лит. ISBN 5-98245-011-1.
- Валеев Р. М., Жуков В. Ю., Кульганек И. В., Мартынов Д. Е., Полянская О. Н. (2020). Биография и научное наследие востоковеда О. М. Ковалевского (по материалам архивов и рукописных фондов). СПб.; Казань: Петербургское востоковедение. ISBN 978-5-85803-537-4.
- Ю. С. Осипов, ed. (2009). "Ковалевский, Осип Михайлович". Киреев — Конго. Большая российская энциклопедия : [в 35 т.] М.: Большая российская энциклопедия. p. 377. ISBN 978-5-85270-345-3.
- Р. М. Валеев; М. З. Закиев, eds. (2002). Наследие монголоведа О. М. Ковалевского и современность: доклады и сообщения международной научной конференции 21—24 июня 2001 г. Казань: Изд-во КГУ. ISBN 5-7464-0241-9.
- Первые Ковалевские чтения: тезисы материалов международной научной конференции, посвященной 185-летию создания кафедры монгольской словесности в Казани (24—26 сентября 2018 г.). Казань: Изд. АН РТ. 2018. ISBN 978-5-9690-0453-5.
- Петряев Е. Д. Краеведы и литераторы Забайкалья: Биобиблиографический указатель. — Чита, 1981.
- P. M. Валеев; И. В. Кульганек; А. Д. Цендина, eds. (2006). Россия - Монголия - Китай: Дневники монголоведа О. М. Ковалевского. 1830—1831 гг. Казань: Изд-во «Таглимат» Института экономики, управления и права. ISBN 5-8399-0133-X.
- Румак, Г. В. (2018). "Активная гражданская позиция О. М. Ковалевского: условия её формирования в школьные и студенческие годы" (PDF). 160 (6) (Учен. зап. Казан. ун-та. Сер. Гуманит. науки. ed.): 1307–1320.
- Талько-Грынцевич Ю. Д. К 100-летию рождения Осипа Михайловича Ковалевского // Труды Троицкосавско-Кяхтинского отделения Приамурского отд. ИРГО. — 1902. — Вып. 1.
- Хохлов А. Н. (2004). "Монголист О. М. Ковалевский: путешествие в Пекин (1830—1831) и контакты с российскими китаеведами". In В. В. Наумкин; Н. Г. Романова; И. М. Смилянская (eds.). Неизвестные страницы отечественного востоковедения: Выпуск 2 (500 экз ed.). М.: Восточная литература. pp. 148–172. ISBN 5-02-018371-7.
- Шамов, Г. Ф. (1983). Профессор О. М. Ковалевский: Очерк жизни и научной деятельности. Казань: Издательство Казанского университета.
- О. Н. Полянской (2008). Эпистолярное и дневниковое наследие монголоведа О. М. Ковалевского (1828—1833). Улан-Удэ: Изд-во Бурятского гос. пед. ун-та. ISBN 978-5-9793-0137-2.
