= Byerastavitsa district =

District of Grodno region, Belarus

Byerastavitsa district Бераставіцкі раён (Belarusian) Берестовицкий район (Russian)
- District
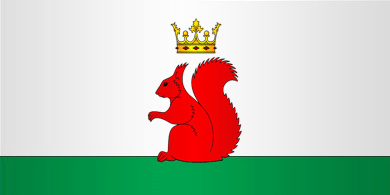
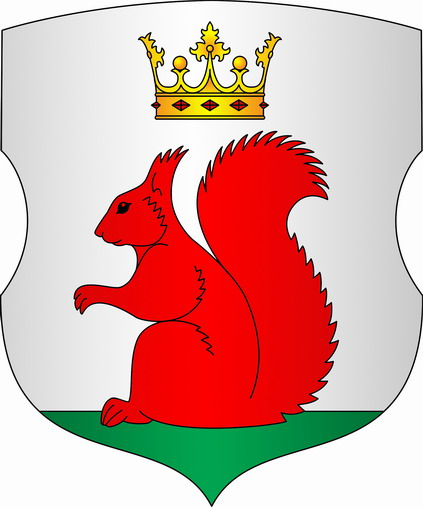
- Flag Coat of arms

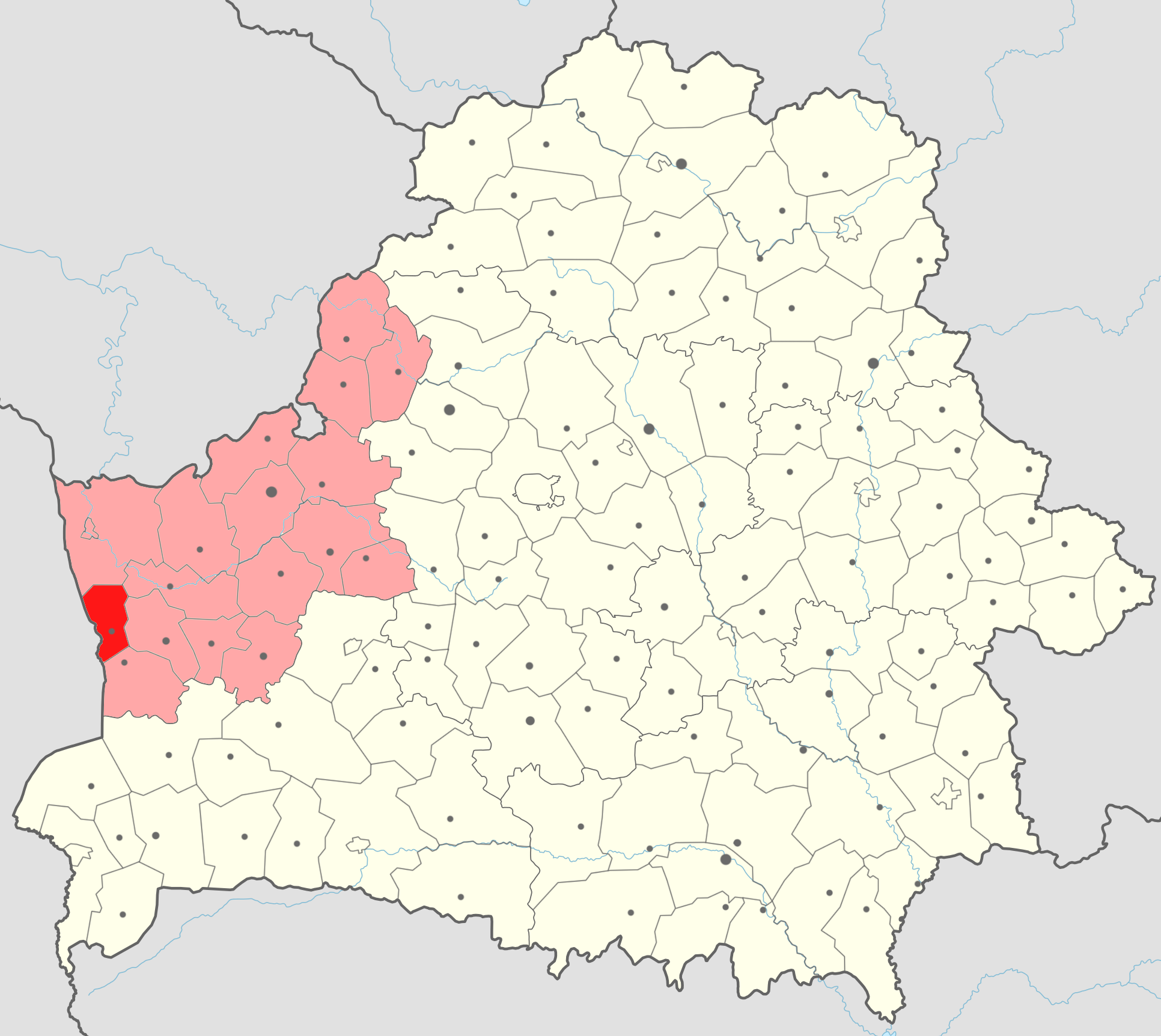
- Coordinates: 53°11′44″N 24°01′15″E
- Country: Belarus
- Region: Grodno region
- Administrative center: Vyalikaya Byerastavitsa

Area
  - District: 743.58 km^{2} (287.10 sq mi)

Population (2024)
  - District: 14,445
  - Density: 19.426/km^{2} (50.314/sq mi)
  - Urban: 5,728
  - Rural: 8,717
- Time zone: UTC+3 (MSK)

Byerastavitsa district or Bierastavica district (Belarusian: Бераставіцкі раён; Russian: Берестовицкий район) is a district (raion) of Grodno region in Belarus. Its administrative center is Vyalikaya Byerastavitsa. As of 2024, it has a population of 14,445.

== History ==
The district was founded from Polish areas annexed by the Soviet Union on January 15, 1940, as Krynki Raion; in 1944, it was renamed to the current name.

== Notable residents ==
- Andrzej Poczobut (born 1973, Vyalikaya Byerastavitsa), Belarusian and Polish journalist and activist, political prisoner
