= Witold Kruczek =

Polish physicist and academic (1922–2024)

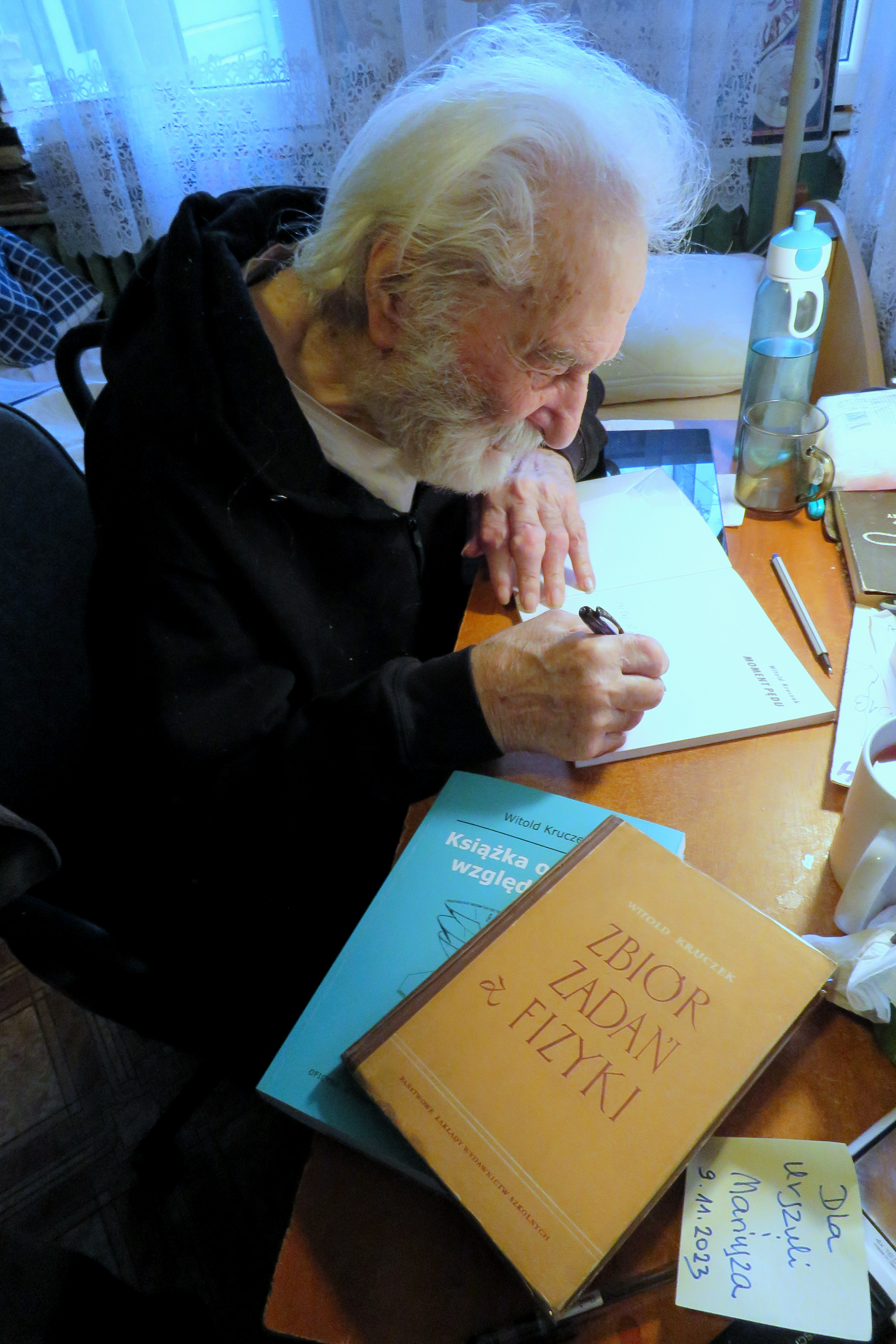
- Kruczek in 2023
- Born: 1 January 1922; Kwarchana, Turkey
- Died: 15 October 2024 (aged 102)
- Scientific career
- Fields: Physics

Witold Kruczek (Witold Kruczek-Abuładze; 1 January 1922 – 15 October 2024) was a Polish physicist, academic, writer and translator of scientific literature in the field of physics, and a Warsaw insurgent.

== World War II activity ==
After the outbreak of World War II, he worked as a miner and then as a cargo transport driver for the "Społem" cooperative in Częstochowa. Saving a friend from the Częstochowa ghetto, he and him got to Warsaw in 1943, where the following year he was caught up in the Warsaw Uprising.

During the uprising, he was a soldier of the 2nd platoon of the Protection Unit of the Military Publishing House (WZW) - Information and Propaganda Office - Headquarters of the Home Army.

After the fall of the uprising, he was deported by Pruszków to Frankfurt (Oder), and then to Bremervörde (Stalag X-B) and Pongau (Stalag XVIII C (317)). He was employed in the construction of the railway in Tschupbach. In the atmosphere of the approaching end of the war, he got through the border with Switzerland to the 2nd Infantry Division of General Bronisław Prugar-Ketling, which had been interned there since 1940, and was repatriated to Poland after the end of hostilities.

== Education and career ==
Kruczek studied at the Lodz University of Technology and then at the Warsaw University of Technology, where he was a long-time lecturer at the Faculty of Technical Physics and Applied Mathematics (including the teaching director of the Institute of Physics in 1976-1981). It is, among others, author of exercises in physics, published in numerous popular science publications, translator of scientific literature in the field of physics (including works by Albert Einstein, published in the university series: "Didactic Library of the Physics Teaching Methodology Team of the Institute of Physics of the Warsaw University of Technology".

In 1985, he went to Algiers, where he lectured on continuum mechanics at the local polytechnic (L'Ecole Nationale Polytechnique).

In 2019, the Military Publishing Institute published a book entitled One of my names is life. Conversations with those who survived the hell of war (ISBN 9788395253669) - a series of interviews with Polish veterans of World War II, including an interview with Witold Kruczek by Piotr Korczyński.

In January 2022, he celebrated his centenary at the Faculty of Physics of the Warsaw University of Technology.

== Personal life and death ==
Kruczek was born to Władysław Kruczek, a mining engineer, and Tamara née Abuładze, a native Georgian with partial Greek roots.

Kruczek was married twice, and had five children. He lived in the Przyjaźń housing estate in Warsaw, in the Bemowo district of Warsaw. Kruczek died on 15 October 2024, at the age of 102.

== Works ==
- A collection of exercises in physics (Ed. Państwowe Zakłady Wydawnictw Szkolnych, Warsaw 1960, 1961, 1962, 1963);
- A collection of physics tasks. For candidates for universities (co-authors: Jędrzej Jędrzejewski, Adam Kujawski; Scientific and Technical Publishing Houses, Warsaw 1973, 1974, 1976, 1984, 1992, 1997; as: A collection of physics tasks for high school students and university candidates, vol. I /II: Scientific and Technical Publishing Houses, Warsaw 1997, 2002, 2004, 2009, 2012, 2016, ISBN 9788301187903);
- Angular momentum in 20 experiments: mechanics, electromagnetism, atom (Academic Research Institute 2002);
- A book on the theory of relativity (reviewer: dr engineer Teodor Buchner; substantive consultation: Jędrzej Stanisławek; Warsaw University of Technology Publishing House, Warsaw 2023, ISBN 9788381564564).
