= Belarusian Partisan =

Belarusian online newspaper

- Website type: Internet newspaper
- Available in: Belarusian/Russian
- Headquarters: Belarus
- Owner: Undisclosed
- Website: www.belaruspartisan.by
- Commercial: Yes
- Registration: Not required
- Launched: 2005
- Current status: News-in media

Belarusian Partizan (Russian: Белорусский Партизан) is a Belarusian Internet newspaper, founded in 2005 by the journalist Pavel Sheremet. It is published mainly in Russian and Belarusian.

On December 14, 2017 Belarusian Partisan was blocked by the Belarus Ministry of Information. As a result of that the site changed its .org domain to the .by domain.

In November 2021, the website, Telegram channel and social networks of the Belarusian Partisan were included in the Belarusian list of the extremist materials. After that, the editors deleted their Telegram channel, explaining this by the desire not to set up readers, and the website of the Belarusian Partisan stopped updating.
