= Kachychy =

Kachychy Качычы (Belarusian)
- Village
- Location within Belarus
- Coordinates: 53°32′56″N 26°06′34″E
- Country: Belarus
- Region: Grodno Region
- District: Karelichy District
- Time zone: UTC+3 (MSK)

Kachychy (Belarusian: Качычы, romanized: Kačyčy; Russian: Качичи, romanized: Kachichi; Polish: Kaczyce) is a village in Karelichy District, Grodno Region, Belarus. Since 2007, it has been part of Malyushychy selsoviet; previously it was under district administration.

== History ==
In the interwar period, the village was situated in the Karelichy Commune in Nowogródek County of the Nowogródek Voivodeship in the Second Polish Republic. After the Soviet invasion of Poland in 1939, the village became part of the Byelorussian Soviet Socialist Republic. In the years 1941–1944, it was under German occupation. Then the village was again part of the Byelorussian SSR. From 1991, it became part of the Republic of Belarus.

=== Battle of Rowiny ===
In January 1945, the battle of Rowiny between the Home Army and the NKVD internal troops took place in this area. 89 Poles, soldiers of the "Tur" and "Grom" units of the Self-Defense of the Vilnius Land were killed. They were buried near Kachychy. In October 2021, the tombstone was devastated, and in July 2022 it was destroyed by the Belarusian authorities.
