= Pyeskawtsy, Voranava district, Grodno region =

Village in Grodno Region, Belarus

Pyeskawtsy Пескаўцы (Belarusian) Песковцы (Russian)
- Village
- Location within Belarus
- Coordinates: 53°50′12″N 24°53′51″E
- Country: Belarus
- Region: Grodno Region
- District: Voranava District
- Time zone: UTC+3 (MSK)

Pyeskawtsy (Belarusian: Пескаўцы, romanized: Pieskaŭcy; Russian: Песковцы, romanized: Peskovtsy; Polish: Piaskowce) is a village in Voranava District, Grodno Region, Belarus. It is part of Misyavichy selsoviet.

== History ==
During the Polish interwar period, the village was situated in Wawiorka Commune, Lida County, Nowogródek Voivodeship, Poland. After the Soviet invasion of Poland in 1939, the village became part of the Byelorussian Soviet Socialist Republic (BSSR). From 1941 to 1944 it was under German occupation. After World War 2, the village once again became part of the BSSR. Since 1991, when the BSSR transitioned to the Republic of Belarus, the village has remained a part of Belarus.

=== World War II ===
During 12–13 March 1945, in Piaskowce and the surrounding area, an Operational Group of the NKVD eliminated a local partisan unit, made up of over 50 local Home Army soldiers (including one French and two German soldiers), an underground network of reservists, and their commander, Franciszek Weramowicz "Kuna". The NKVD group, pretending to be a "green" or "Vlasovtsy" unit under the command of Mirkowski, infiltrated the Kuna unit. The commander of "Kuna" personally knew one of the greens who was an NKVD agent under the pseudonym "Pierwyj" and, trusting him, was persuaded to merge the divisions. On March 12, the greens killed most of the Home Army unit in the village of Pieskawtsy using knives, axes and firearms. In the morning, the commander Franciszek Weramowicz was murdered in the greens' headquarters. During the day, the Home Army patrols were killed in the forest near the village of Dainowa, and by evening, people in the village of Pieskawtsy were murdered indiscriminately. According to documents, 36 people were killed during this period. The bodies were taken by the police to Radun for recognition. Those killed on patrols were buried in the forest near the village of Dainowa. Some of the Home Army unit, including the three French and German soldiers, broke away through the ring of Soviet troops surrounding the village of Pieskawtsy. At dawn the following day, on 13 March 1945, the NKVD murdered 23 reservists from the discovered network in surrounding villages, now interred in adjacent cemeteries. Mirkowski was awarded the title of Hero of the Soviet Union for this operation.

On the right side of the road Zieniewicze – Pieskawtsy, at the crossroads to the village of Dainowa, a high wooden cross, painted blue, was erected. In 2011, a metal cross with a granite plaque commemorating those murdered on March 12–13, 1945 was placed on a stone mound. The plaque was destroyed in 2022.
