= Dyndylishki =

Dyndylishki Дындылішкі (Belarusian)
- Village
- Location within Belarus
- Coordinates: 53°53′31″N 25°44′54″E
- Country: Belarus
- Region: Grodno Region
- District: Iwye District

Dyndylishki (Belarusian: Дындылішкі, romanized: Dyndyliški; Russian: Дындылишки; Polish: Dyndyliszki) is a village in Iwye District, Grodno Region, Belarus.

== History ==
In the interwar period, the village was part of Poland, in the Nowogródek Voivodeship, within Lida County, and forming part of the Iwye Commune. According to the 1921 census, the village had a population of 69, entirely Polish by nationality. After the Soviet invasion of Poland in 1939, the village became part of the BSSR. From 1941-1944 it was under German occupation.

On June 24, 1944, during the march towards the Naliboki forest, an improvised grouping of the Home Army, code-named "Bagatelka", commanded by Maj. Maciej Kalenkiewicz "Kotwicz" (soldiers of the 1st Battalion of the 77th Infantry Regiment of the Home Army) fought German units stationed in Iwye. Home Army troops were attacked by the Germans as a result of a denunciation. According to Kazimierz Krajewski, 8 Polish partisans were killed in the battle at Dyndylishki. They were: boatswain. Wacław "Gryf" Hamera, Jan "Cichy" Panasiewicz, Michał "Zefir" Zdanowicz, Cpl. "Zagłoba" and other unknown soldiers.

Postwar, it returned to the BSSR, which became the Republic of Belarus in 1991. Until 2017, the village was part of Moryna village.

The burial place of the fallen Home Army soldiers is located by the road in the village. The tomb was devastated in 2022.
