= Vyalikaya Byerastavitsa =

Vyalikaya Byerastavitsa Вялікая Бераставіца (Belarusian)
- Urban-type settlement
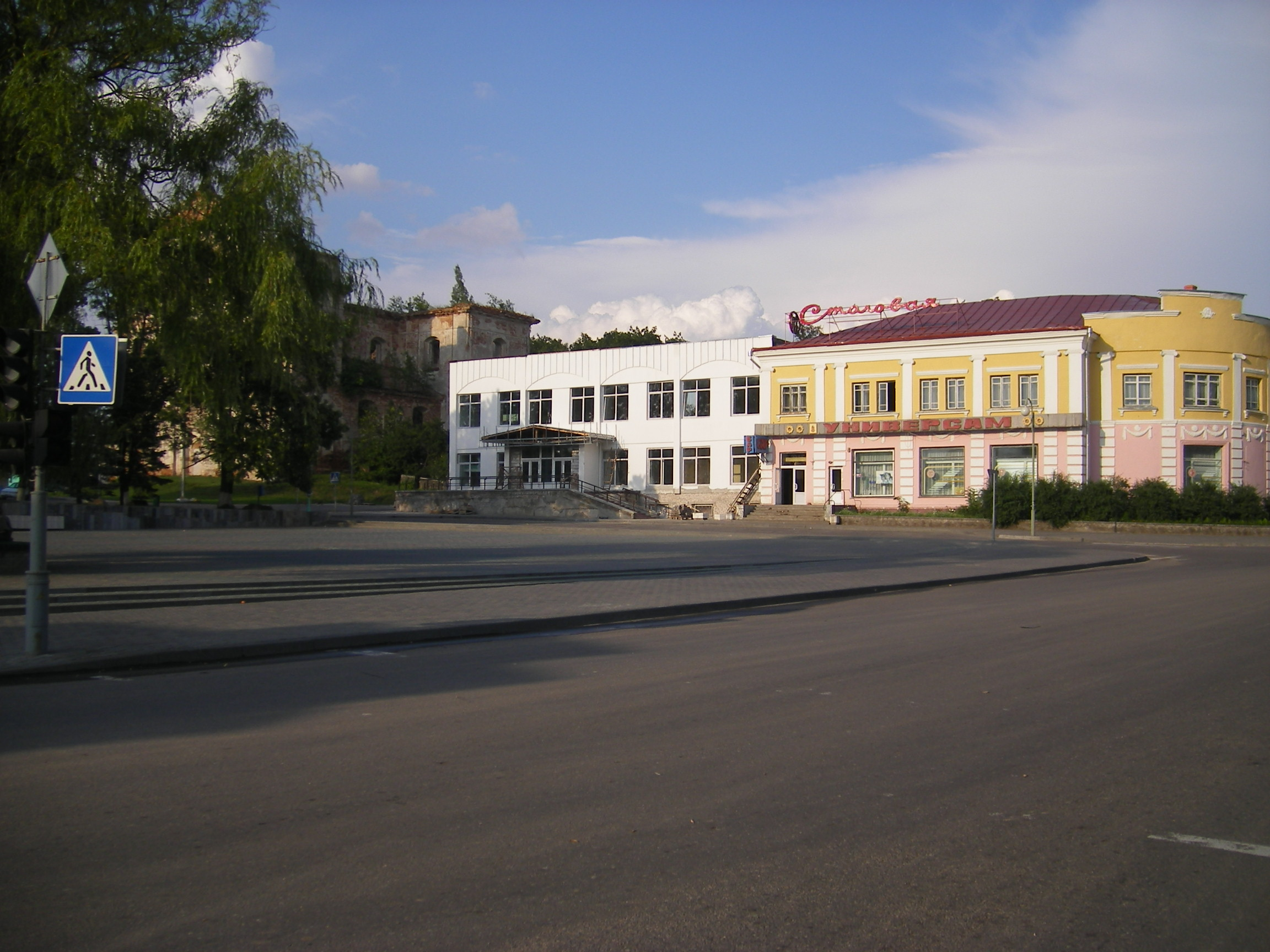
- Town square

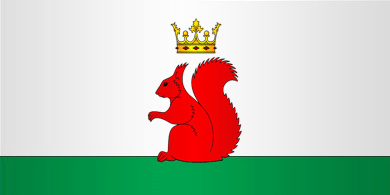
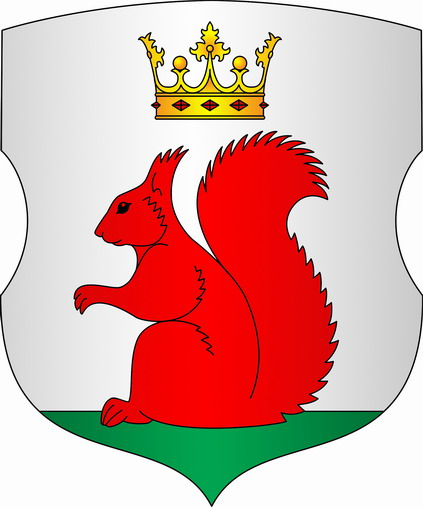
- Flag Coat of arms

- Location within Belarus
- Coordinates: 53°11′44″N 24°01′15″E
- Country: Belarus
- Region: Grodno Region
- District: Byerastavitsa District
- Elevation: 161 m (528 ft)

Population (2025)
  - Total: 5,647
- Time zone: UTC+3 (MSK)
- Postal code: 231778
- Area code: +375 1511

Vyalikaya Byerastavitsa (Note: Belarusian: Вялікая Бераставіца, romanized: Vialikaja Bierastavica; Russian: Большая Берестовица, romanized: Bolshaya Berestovitsa; Polish: Brzostowica Wielka; Yiddish: וויאַליקייַאַ ביעראַסטאַוויצאַ.) is an urban-type settlement in Grodno Region, Belarus. It serves as the administrative center of Byerastavitsa District. It is located near the city of Grodno. As of 2025, it has a population of 5,647.

== History ==
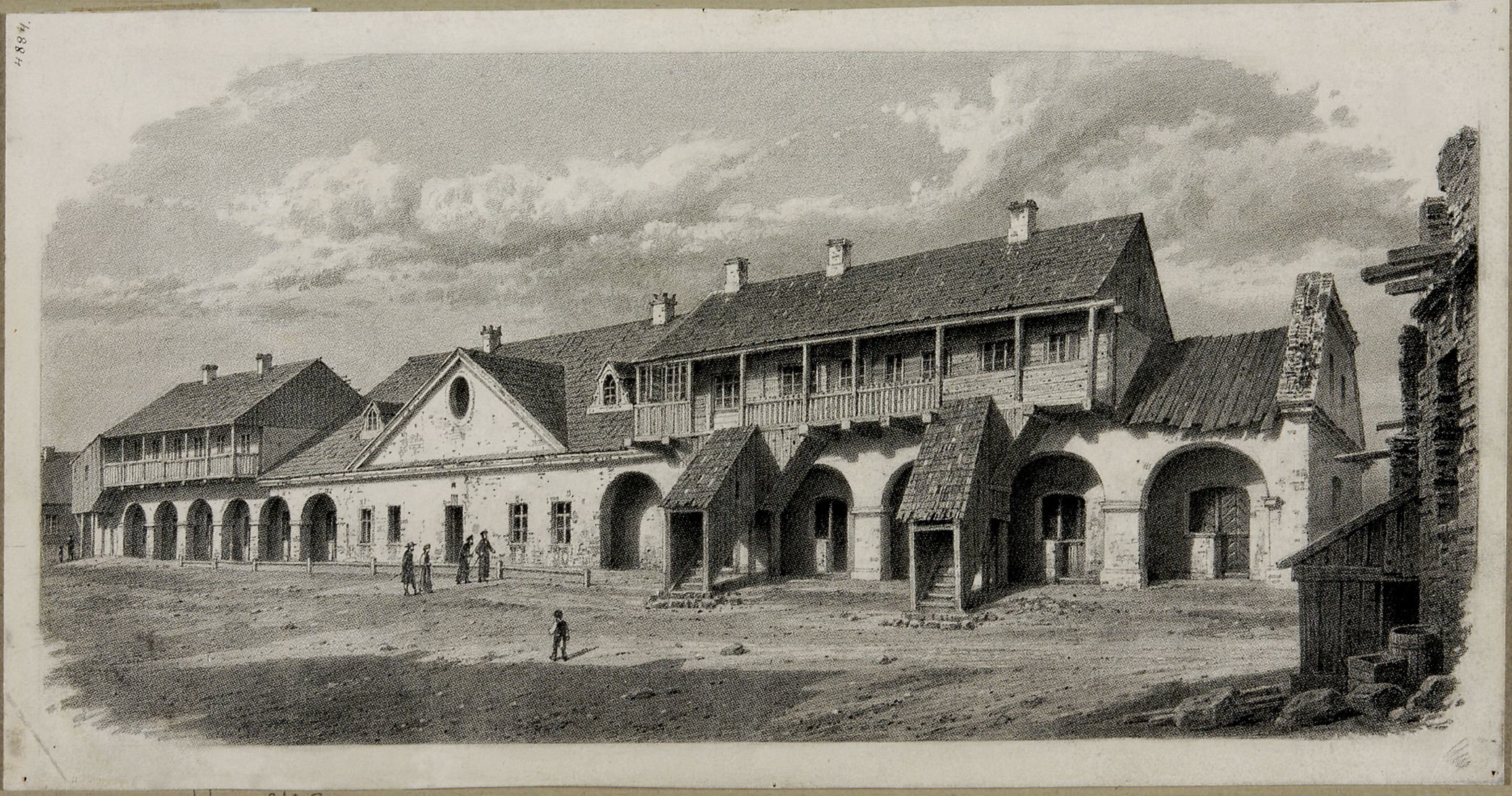
Town hall, 1882

It was granted by King Alexander Jagiellon to the Chodkiewicz family. It was a private town of the Chodkiewicz, Mniszech, Potocki and Kossakowski families, administratively located in the Grodno County in the Troki Voivodeship of the Polish–Lithuanian Commonwealth.

In the interwar period, Brzostowica Wielka, as it was known in Polish, was administratively located in the Grodno County in the Białystok Voivodeship of Poland. In the 1921 census, 51.4% people declared Jewish nationality, 43.5% declared Polish nationality and 5.1% declared Belarusian nationality.

During World War II, the town was first occupied by the Soviet Union until 1941, then by Nazi Germany until 1944, and re-occupied by the Soviet Union afterwards.

== Demographics ==
Historical population
Year	Pop.	±%
1878	1,694	—
1921	1,371	−19.1%
2023	5,665	+313.2%
2024	5,728	+1.1%
2025	5,647	−1.4%

== Notable people ==
- Józef Kowalewski (1801–1878), Polish orientalist, co-founder of the Philomatic Association
- Andrzej Poczobut (born 1973), journalist and activist of the Polish minority in Belarus
