= Bobravichy =

Bobravichy Бобравічы (Belarusian)
- Village
- Location within Belarus
- Coordinates: 53°57′32″N 26°00′49″E
- Country: Belarus
- Region: Grodno Region
- District: Iwye District
- Time zone: UTC+3
- Postal code: 231369
- Area code: +375 1595
- Vehicle registration: 4

Bobravichy (Belarusian: Бобравічы, romanized: Bobravičy; Russian: Бобровичи, romanized: Bobrovichi; Polish: Bobrowicze) is a village in Iwye District, Grodno Region, Belarus.

== History ==
In the interwar period, the village was situated in Poland, in the Nowogródek Voivodeship, in the Wołożyn County, in the Ługomowicze Commune. According to the 1921 census, the village had a population of 265, 99.2% Polish. After the Soviet invasion of Poland in 1939, the village became part of the BSSR. In the years 1941–1944 it was under German occupation. Then the village was again in the BSSR. From 1991 in the Republic of Belarus.

=== Home Army grave ===
In a forest clearing near the non-existent Bobrowicze settlement, on the site of a farm burnt down by the NKVD, there is a mass grave of Home Army soldiers from the group of Lieutenant Kopaczek "Jodła" and a cadet. Eryk Barcz "Eryk", part of the 1st Active Self-Defense Division of the Vilnius Region. They died on September 14, 1944, in the fight against the operational group of the 32nd motorized rifle regiment of the NKVD Internal Forces. Earlier, this unit burned down the selsoviet in Lazduny and broke the Soviet manhunt, inflicting heavy losses on it. However, he was again located and encircled by the overwhelming enemy forces. During the several-hour-long fight a dozen or even 24 soldiers of the Home Army died. The grave was set up in September 1996 thanks to the efforts of Stanisław Paszul "Węgiel", partisan of the 6th Battalion of the 77th Polish Home Army, who was included in this fight and sentenced to 25 years in labor camps (after being released in 1956 and returning to Poland, and then emigrating in 1963 to the United States, he initiated the erection of the Katyn Memorial in Jersey City). In June 2022, the grave was destroyed by the Belarusian authorities.
