= Mikulishki =

Village in Grodno Region, Belarus

Mikulishki Мікулішкі (Belarusian)
- Village
- Location within Belarus
- Coordinates: 54°21′52″N 25°40′39″E
- Country: Belarus
- Region: Grodno Region
- District: Ashmyany District

Mikulishki (Belarusian: Мікулішкі, romanized: Mikuliški; Russian: Микулишки; Russian: Mikuliszki) is a village in Ashmyany District, Grodno Region, Belarus. It is situated on the Merkys River.

== History ==
In the interwar period, the village was situated in Poland, in the Wilno Voivodeship, in the Wilno-Troki County, in the Turgiele Commune. After the Soviet invasion of Poland in 1939, the village became part of the BSSR. In the years 1941-1944 it was under German occupation. On January 8, 1944, in Mikulishki, soldiers of the 3rd and 6th Vilnius Brigade of the Home Army replied the attack of the German gendarmerie and the Lithuanian and Belarusian police. From 1944, the village was again in the BSSR. From 1991 in the Republic of Belarus.

== AK Soldiers Cemetery ==
On the southern edge of the village, in the forest, on the dunes at the edge of the backwaters of the Merkys River there is a cemetery, where, according to tradition, January insurgents were buried. Insurgents from the board of Bolesław Narbutt, the younger brother of Ludwik, who died on June 21, 1863, in nearby Rudniki were buried here.

In 22 graves of those killed in the battle on January 8, 1944, one soldier of the 3rd AK Brigade who fallen on March 17, 1944, in Czarny Bór, one soldier killed in March 1944 in Murzyny, soldiers of the 3rd AK Brigade Fallen on May 13, 1944, in the battle of Murowana Oszmianka and in June 1944 in the ambush near the road near Jašiūnai, as well as two soldiers of the 6th AK brigade fallen on July 9, 1944, in Kamionka. Aleksander Stankiewicz from Mikulishki and Antoni Piotkowicz murdered by the NKVD in February 1945.

The accommodation of the Home Army soldiers was built thanks to the efforts of the former Home Army communities of the 3rd and 6th Home Army Brigade. Construction costs were co -financed by the Council for the Protection of Struggle and Martyrdom Sites. The quarters were opened and dedicated in June 1992. For a long time, Józef Pietkiewicz, a resident of the village of Mikulishki, looked after cemetery. The cemetery was destroyed by the Belarusian authorities in July 2022.
