= Poles in Belarus =

Ethnic group in Belarus

Polish minority in Belarus
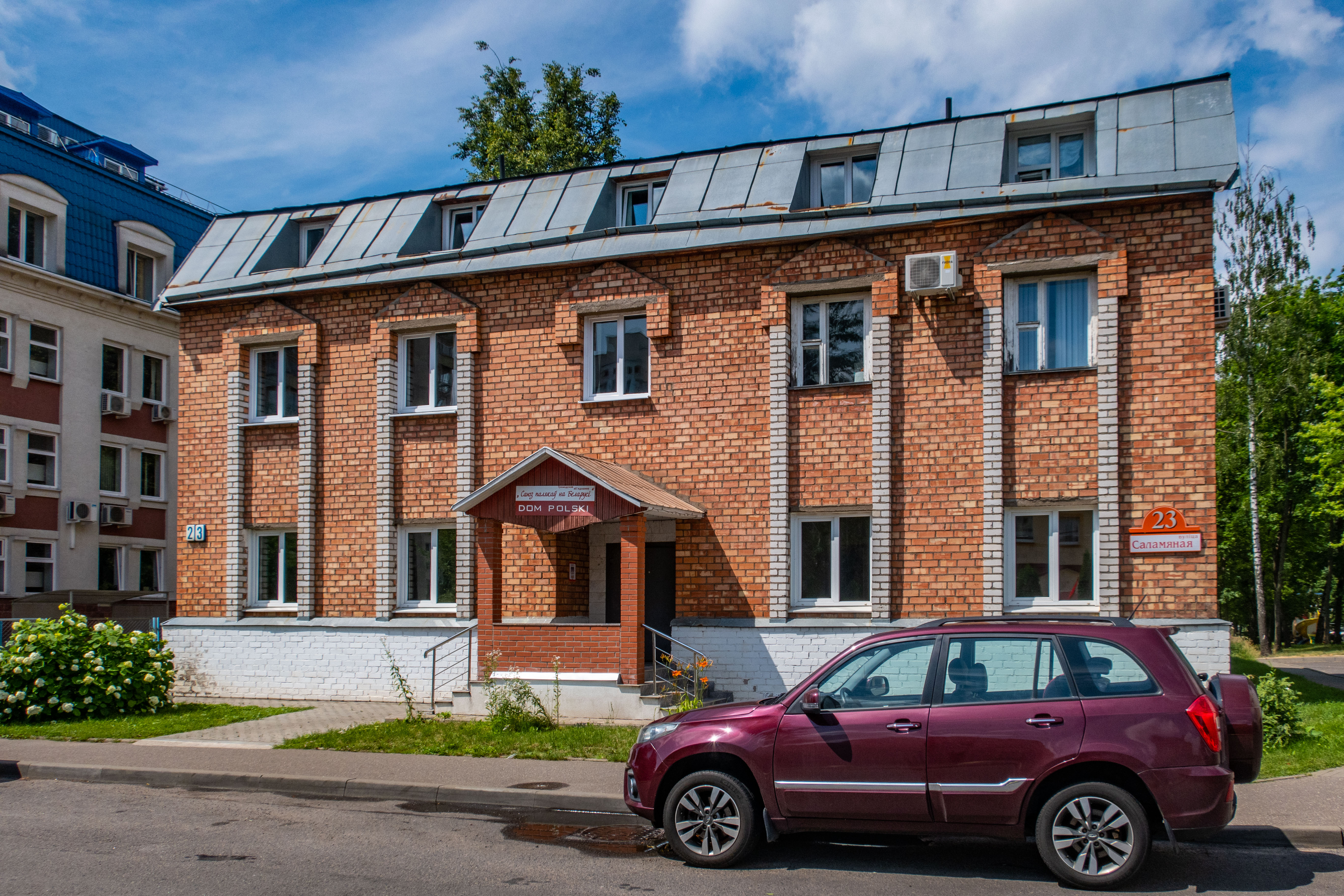
- Office of the Union of Poles in Belarus in Minsk

Total population
- 287,693 (2019 census) – 1,100,000 (Polish estimates)

Regions with significant populations
- Grodno Region

Languages
- Belarusian · Russian · Polish

Religion
- Predominantly Roman Catholicism

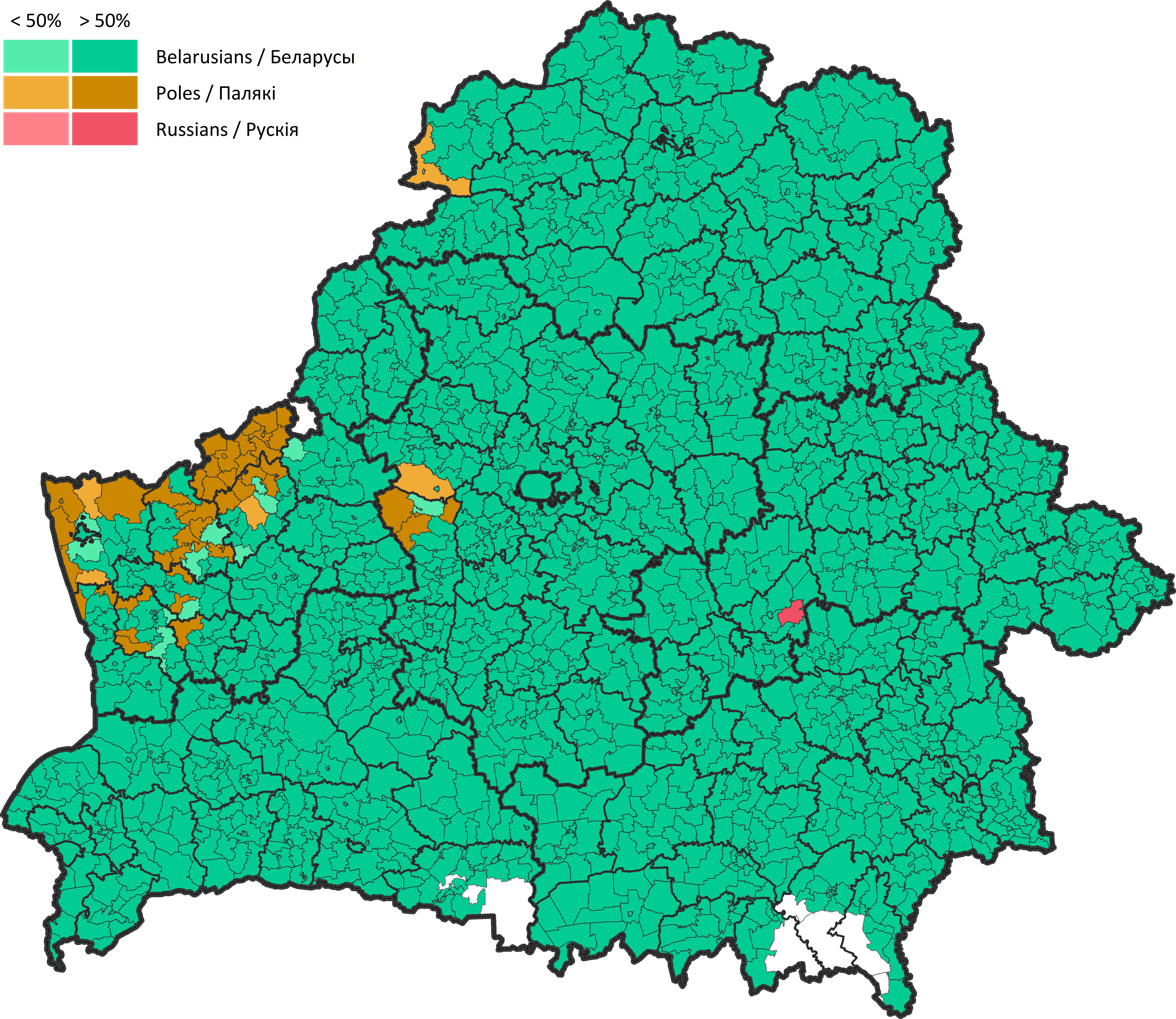
Polish majority (dark brown) and plurality (light brown) in communes of Belarus

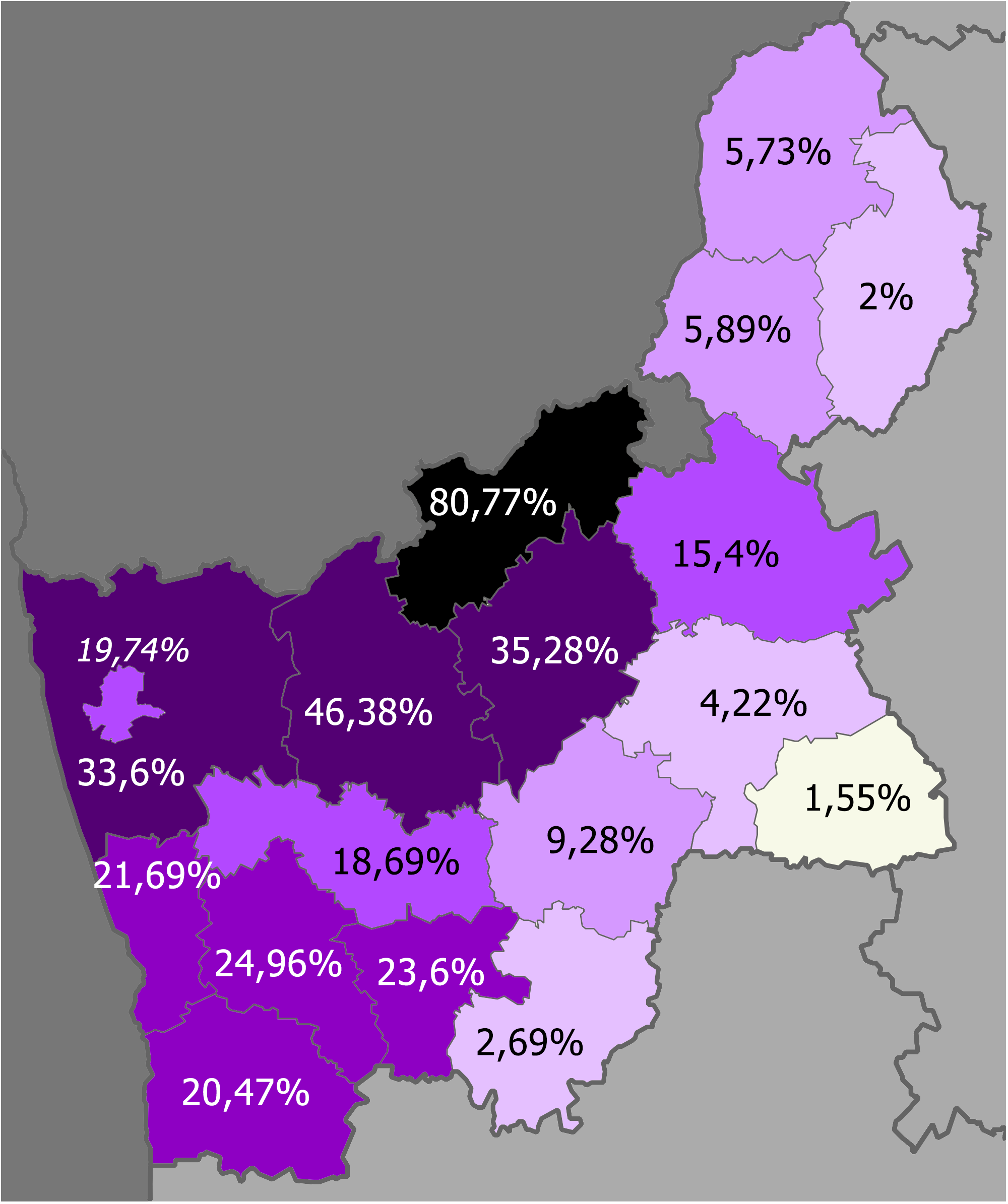
Poles in Grodno region

The Polish minority in Belarus (Polish: Polacy na Białorusi; Belarusian: Палякі ў Беларусі, romanized: Paliaki w Bielarusi) numbers officially 287,693 according to 2019 census. However, according to the Ministry of Foreign Affairs of Poland the number is as high as 1,100,000. It forms the second largest ethnic minority in the country after the Russians, at around 3.1% of the total population according to the official census. According to the official census, an estimated 205,200 Belarusian Poles live in large agglomerations and 82,493 in smaller settlements, with the number of women exceeding the number of men by 33,905. Some estimates by Polish non-governmental sources in the U.S. are higher, citing the previous poll held in 1989 under the Soviet authorities with 413,000 Poles recorded and the census of 1959 with 538,881 Poles recorded in Belarus.

Since the dissolution of the Soviet Union and the emergence of sovereign Republic of Belarus, the situation of the Polish minority has been steadily improving. The politics of Sovietization pursued by decades of indoctrination, went down in history. Poles in Belarus began re-establishing the Polish language schools and their legal right of participating in the religious life. However, the attitude of new authorities to Polish minority are not very consistent. The new laws are insufficient, and the local levels of Belarusian government are largely unwilling to accept the aspirations of their own ethnic Poles, making them into new targets for state-sanctioned intolerance, according to 2005 report by The Economist.

== History ==
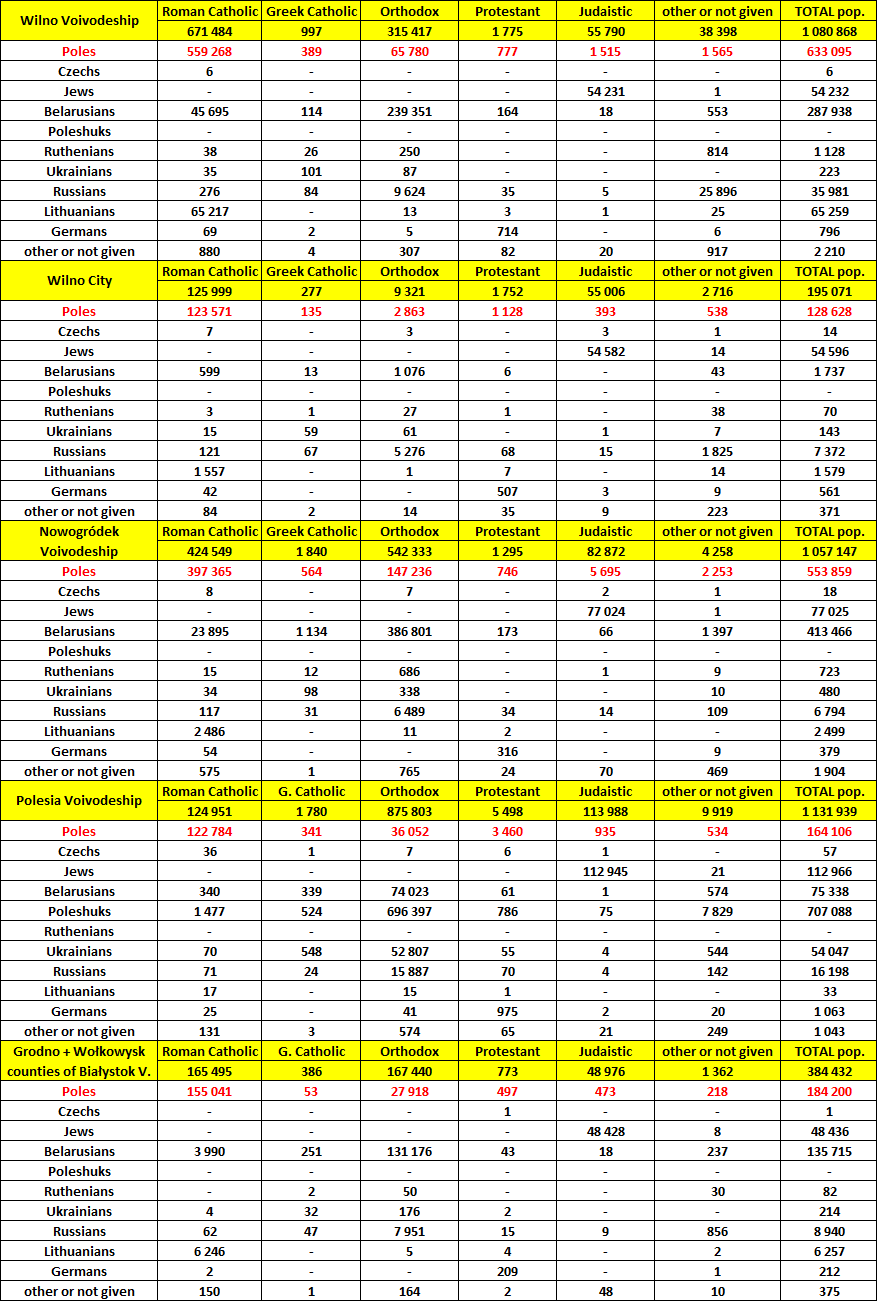
Linguistic (mother tongue) and religious structure of Northern Kresy (today parts of Belarus and Lithuania) according to the Polish census of 1931

Polish minority districts in 1960: Over 50% Polish 40–50% 30–40% 10–30% Up to 10% Polish Border of Poland in 1939

Polish ethnic and cultural presence in modern Belarus are an intricate part of its history. The lands of modern Belarus are the birthplace of important Polish historical figures, such as the writer Mickiewicz or scientist Domejko among others. The proto-Belarusian language, called Ruthenian or Old Belarusian was protected by law in the Polish–Lithuanian Commonwealth and used as the local vernacular, while both Polish and Latin languages were the lingua franca of the throne. "As the 16th century drew to a close" – wrote Andrew Savchenko about the local nobles, they had to contend with "an increasingly stark choice: to strengthen their ties with Poland or to suffer disastrous military defeat and subjugation" by the Russian Empire, thus leading to their 'voluntary' "Polonization". After the Napoleonic Wars, Russia annexed the territories of the former Grand Duchy of Lithuania as its North-Western Territory. Throughout the 19th century, a majority of the gentry, which comprised about 10% of the population, continued to identify as culturally Polish. But "the mass of unassuming peasants", ethnically Lithuanian or Belarusian, "was subjected to active Russification" by the Tsarist authorities including the abolition of the Uniate Church created by the Union of Brest, a uniquely Belarusian institution and a cornerstone of the Belarusian nation.

The territories of the Russian Empire consisting of modern Belarus were divided in 1921 between Poland and the Russian Soviet Federative Socialist Republic at the Treaty of Riga, thus ending the Polish-Soviet War. Thousands of Poles settled in the area following the peace treaty. In the elections of November 1922, a Belarusian party (in the Blok Mniejszości Narodowych coalition) obtained 14 seats in the Polish parliament (11 of them in the lower chamber, Sejm). In 1923, a new regulation was passed allowing for the Belarusian language to be used officially both in courts and in schools. Obligatory teaching of the Belarusian language was introduced in all Polish gymnasia in areas inhabited by Belarusians in 1927.

Across the border, in the Belarusian SSR, Minsk was home to Polish community organizations and a Polish-speaking national theatre of Belarus. In addition, a Polish Autonomous District, Dzierżyńszczyzna, was proclaimed on Soviet territory. However, in East Belarus the Soviet authorities liquidated most Polish organizations in the early 1930s.

=== The "Polish operation" of the NKVD ===
In 1937–1938, the Soviet Byelorussia witnessed the "Polish Operation" of the NKVD. The state-sanctioned campaign of mass-murder which took place approximately from August 25, 1937 to November 15, 1938, according to archives of the Soviet NKVD, resulted in the killing of 111,091 ethnic Poles (mostly men). Additional 28,744 were sentenced to death-ridden labor camps; amounting to 139,835 Polish victims across the country (10% of the officially persecuted persons during the entire Yezhovshchina period, with confirming NKVD documents). About 17% of the total number of victims came from Byelorussia, among them, thousands of peasants, railway workers, industrial labourers, engineers and similar others, resulting in near collapse of its economy. In a typical Stalinist fashion, the murdered Polish families were accused of "anti-Soviet" activities and state terrorism.

=== World War II ===
Following the Nazi–Soviet Invasion of Poland in 1939, the Polish anti-German resistance movement Armia Krajowa was actively operating on the territory of modern Belarus, although many ethnic Belarusians also actively participated in the movement. Soon after the Soviet invasion of Poland, Poland was divided between Germany and the Soviet Union in accordance with the Molotov–Ribbentrop Pact. The eastern part was incorporated into the USSR following staged elections. Part of this area (West Belarus) was added to the Soviet republic of Belarus.

In their attack, the Red Army overrun 52.1% of territory of interwar Poland with over 13,700,000 inhabitants. The Soviet occupation zone included also 336,000 new refugees who escaped from Polish lands invaded by Germany, numbering at around 198,000. Spreading terror throughout the region, the Soviet secret police (NKVD) accompanying the Red Army massacred Polish prisoners of war, and in less than two years, deported up to 1.5 million ethnic Poles to Siberia including Poles and Polish Jews from West Belarus. Twenty-one months after the Soviet invasion of Poland, during the German Operation Barbarossa of June 1941, West Belarus was overrun again by the Wehrmacht followed closely behind by Einsatzgruppen and the mass executions of Polish Jews commenced.

=== 1945–1989 ===
In 1945, the Big Three, Great Britain, the United States and the Soviet Union, established new borders for Poland. The Polish population was soon forcibly resettled as part of the Soviet-Polish population exchange. Many inhabitants of Belarus who identified themselves as Poles were allowed to go back to Poland. In exchange, several thousands of Belarusians from parts of the former Belastok Region were resettled to Belarus.

The remaining Polish minority in Belarus was significantly discriminated against during the times of the Soviet Union. By 1949, all Polish-language schools were replaced with Russian, and not even a single one remained due to the continuing policies of Sovietization. All Polish organizations and social clubs were liquidated. Incidentally, the Poles were the only ethnic group in the Byelorussian SSR whose existence was denied by the communist administration. Until 1989, printing in Polish and teaching Polish in any form, including as a foreign language, was banned. The Catholic Church faced severe repression, with its institutions shut down, churches closed and turned into warehouses, and priests either killed or imprisoned in Gulag camps. By the 1980s, only a quarter of parishes remained, and slightly over half of them had a priest. The situation of the Polish minority started to improve only in the later years of the Soviet Union prior to its dissolution, but faced difficulties from the government of Alexander Lukashenko.

== Current situation ==
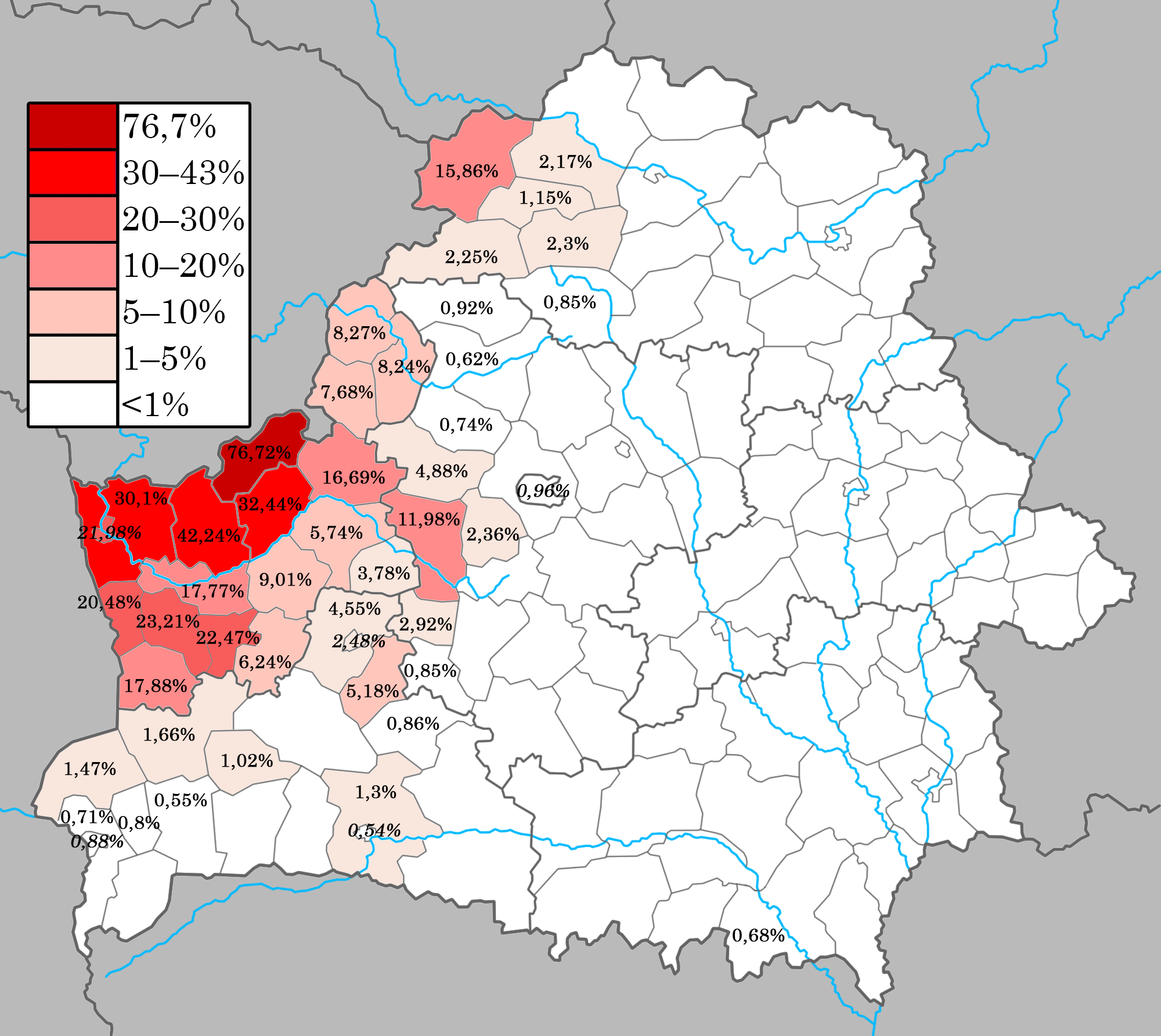
Ethnic Poles share in Belarus (2019 census), district level data

According to the 2019 census, Polish minority in Belarus officially numbered 287,693. After the Russian minority, Poles form the second largest minority group in Belarus. The majority of Poles live in the Western regions including 223,119 in the Grodno oblast. Poles are the majority in Sapotskin and its surroundings, as well as in Voranava District. The largest Polish organization in Belarus is the Union of Poles in Belarus (Związek Polaków na Białorusi), with over 20,000 members.

Between 1999 and 2019, the share of Poles with higher education increased from 8.9% to 21.7%. For Belarusians, these figures were 12.0% and 25.8%, respectively.

Population pyramid for Poles in Belarus in 2019

A slim majority of Poles use Russian, just like a majority of ethnic Belarusians. This arose because the Poles in Belarus live mostly in the Belarusian-speaking parts of the country, while Russian now dominates in Minsk and most of eastern Belarus. Very few Belarusian Poles use Polish daily.

Language most often spoken at home by ethnic Poles (Note: Percentages include only individuals who provided a response.)
Year	Polish		Belarusian		Russian	
Year	Number	%	Number	%	Number	%
1999	18,720	4.7%	227,846	57.6%	149,017	37.7%
2009	3,837	1.4%	120,378	43.9%	149,904	54.7%
2019	3,590	1.3%	132,366	46.2%	150,815	52.6%

As of 2009, Belarus had two Polish-language schools. In 2017, these schools educated 868 students, and an additional 736 students studied Polish as a subject in 14 other schools. Both Polish-language schools were closed in 2022.

As Poland supports the pro-democracy opposition in Belarus, Polish-Belarusian relations are poor, and representatives of the Polish minority in Belarus often complain about various repressions, such as the jailing for 15 days of the former head of the Union of Poles, Tadeusz Gawin. He was sentenced on 2 August 2005 for arranging a meeting between a visiting deputy speaker of the Polish parliament, Donald Tusk, and the ethnic Polish activists including Veslaw Kewlyak, also sentenced for 15 days. The Lukashenko government launched a campaign against the Polish ethnic minority claiming that they were trying to destabilise the balance of power, and that the Polish minority is a fifth column (see earlier Soviet proclamations). In May and June of that year, a Polish diplomat was expelled, a Polish-language newspaper was closed and the democratically elected leadership of a local Polish organisation, the Union of Poles in Belarus (UPB), had their own nominees forcibly replaced by those sympathetic to Lukashenko.

The introduction of the Karta Polaka (Polish Charter) in 2007 confirming Polish heritage of individuals who cannot obtain dual citizenship in their own countries, enabled inhabitants of Belarus to formally declare their Polish identity for the Ministry of Foreign Affairs of Poland. From 2008 to 2023, 165,428 cards were issued. The introduction caused protests from Belarusian officials.

Due to the ban on education in Polish during the Soviet period, knowledge of the Latin script by Belarusian Poles was minimal after independence in 1991. Consequently, the Cyrillic script is used to a certain extent today to write Polish in Western Belarus, especially for religious texts.

== See also ==
- Belarus–Poland relations
- Demographics of Belarus
- Population exchange between Poland and Soviet Belarus in the aftermath of World War II
- Belarusian minority in Poland
- Poles in Lithuania
- Polish minority in Russia
- Poles in Ukraine
- Poles in the former Soviet Union
