= Union of Poles in Belarus =

Belarusian non-governmental Polish minority organisation

- Саюз палякаў Беларусі; Związek Polaków na Białorusi
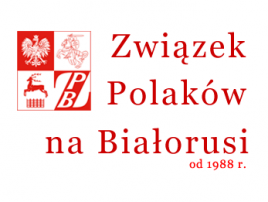
- Formation: 1988
- Location: Grodno, Belarus
- Members: ~20,000
- Leader: Andżelika Borys
- Website: glosznadniemna.pl

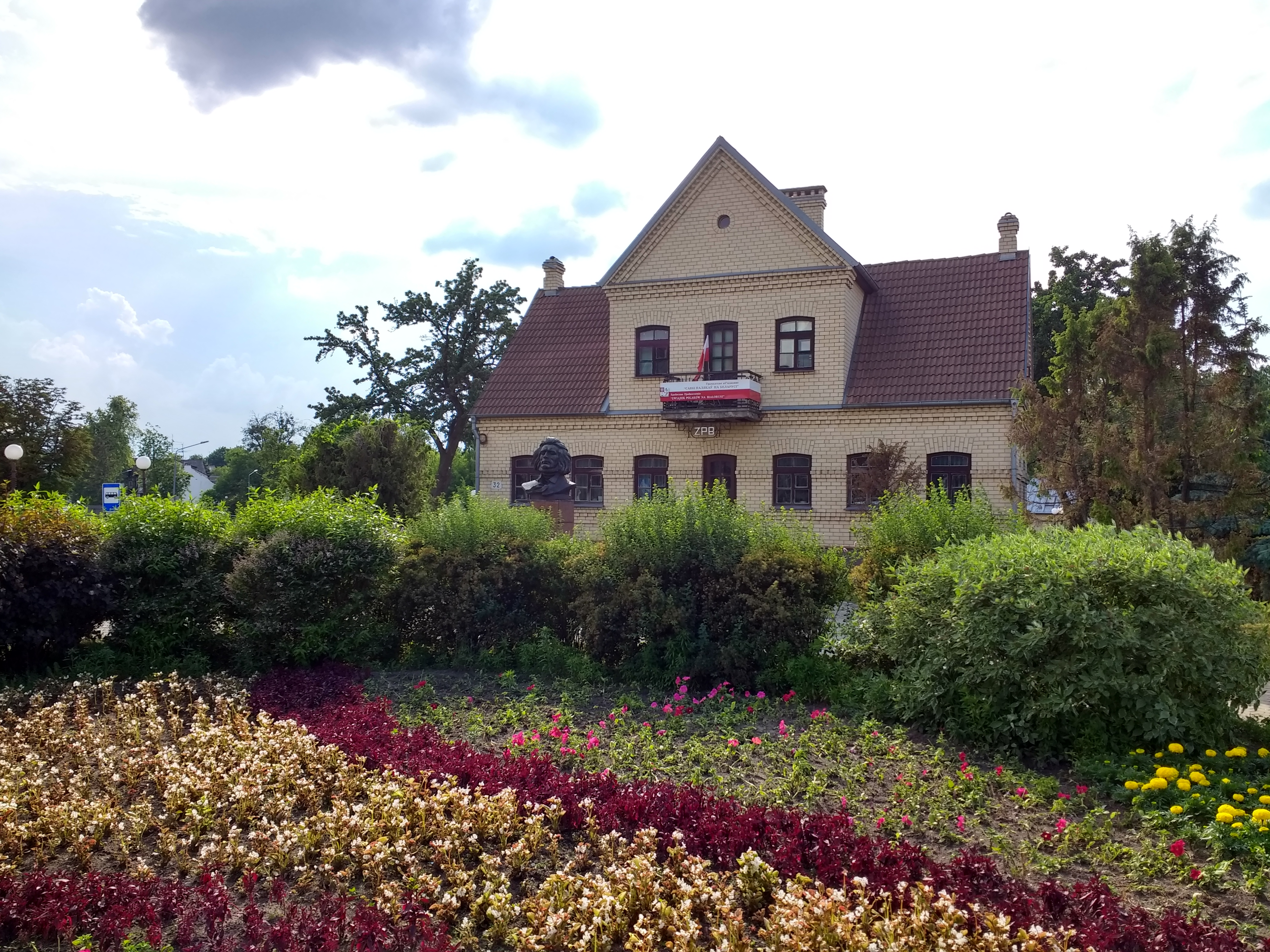
Office of the organisation in Grodno

The Union of Poles in Belarus (Polish: Związek Polaków na Białorusi, Belarusian: Саюз палякаў Беларусі, romanized: Sajuz paliakaŭ Bielarusi) is an organisation located in Belarus. The group, which has a membership of 20,000 people, represents the Polish minority in Belarus, numbering about 300,000. It forms the second largest ethnic minority in the country after the Russians, at 3.1% of the total population. An estimated 180,905 Belarusian Poles live in large agglomerations and 113,644 in smaller settlements, with the number of women exceeding the number of men by about 33,000, as per official data (and much higher according to unofficial estimates).

Lately, the group has received international attention due to the Belarusian Government cracking down on the group and their activities. The leader of Belarus, Alexander Lukashenko, has accused Poland and the European Union of trying to use the group to create an uprising similar to what took place in Ukraine, Georgia and Kyrgyzstan.

Since 2005, there are two groups using the above name. The first, is that led by Andżelika Borys which is prohibited by Belarusian government. The second, has the support of the Belarusian government, and is led by Stanisław Siemaszko.

In March 2021, Andżelika Borys, Andrzej Poczobut and other members of the first group were detained and indicted for allegedly inciting hatred. In March 2022, Borys was released from custody; in April 2023, the criminal case against her was closed. In February 2023, Andrzej Poczobut was sentenced in February 2023 to 8 years of penal colony.

On December 30, 2021, the Leninsky District Court of Grodno recognized the website of the Union of Poles as an extremist material. In the spring of 2024, the KGB labeled the site, which by then had ceased to be the portal of the Union of Poles of Belarus, as an "extremist group".
