= Kruk (surname) =

Kruk is a surname. The word means "raven" in Polish, Belarusian, and Ukrainian languages. Polish archaic feminine forms: Krukówna (after father), Krukowa (after husband).

Notable people with the surname include:

- Elżbieta Kruk (born 1959), Polish politician
- Frances Kruk, Polish-Canadian poet
- Herman Kruk (1897–1944), Polish-Jewish activist during World War II
- Isaiah Kruk, birth surname of Isaiah Shavitt, Israeli-American theoretical chemist
- Janusz Kruk, (1946–1992), Polish singer, guitarist and composer
- John Kruk (born 1961), American baseball player
- Joseph Kruk (1885−1972), Polish-Jewish politician
- Mariusz Kruk, Polish sprint canoer
- Pavel Kruk (born 1992), Belarusian football player
- Petro Kruk (born 1985), Ukrainian sprint canoer
- Svetlana Kruk (born 1979), Belarusian beauty queen

== Feminine ==
- Agnieszka Krukówna, Polish actress

== Fictional, characters ==
- Frank Kruk, protagonist of the eponymous novel by Petras Cvirka

== See also ==
- Krük
- Kreuk
- Pieter van der Kruk (1941–2020), Dutch weightlifter and shot putter
- Pieter van der Kruk Jr. (born 1972), Dutch discus thrower and shot putter
