= Krukowski =

Krukowski (feminine: Krukowska; plural: Krukowscy) is a Polish surname. It may refer to:

- Andrzej Krukowski (born 1961), Polish actor
- Kazimierz Krukowski (1901–1984), Polish cabaret performer
- Magdalena Krukowska (born 1987), Polish canoer
- Marcin Krukowski (born 1992), Polish javelin thrower

== See also ==
- Krukowski coat of arms
