= Censorship in Belarus =

Censorship in Belarus, although prohibited by the country's constitution, is enforced by a number of laws. These include a law that makes insulting the president punishable by up to five years in prison, and another that makes criticizing Belarus abroad punishable by up to two years in prison.

Freedom of the press in Belarus remains extremely restricted. State-owned media are subordinated to the president and harassment and censorship of independent media are routine. The government subjects both independent and foreign media to systematic political intimidation, especially for reporting on the deteriorating economy and human rights abuses. Journalists are harassed and detained for reporting on unauthorized demonstrations or working with unregistered media outlets. Journalists have been killed in suspicious circumstances. Most local independent outlets regularly practice self-censorship.

Reporters Without Borders ranked Belarus 154th out of 178 countries in its 2010 Press Freedom Index. In the 2011 Freedom House Freedom of the Press report, Belarus scored 92 on a scale from 10 (most free) to 99 (least free), because the Lukashenko regime systematically curtails press freedom. This score placed Belarus 9th from the bottom of the 196 countries included in the report and earned the country a "Not Free" status. In 2021, after a year-long purge on independent media by Lukashenko regime, the country dropped down to the 158th place in the PFI rating.

== Registration and state control on the media ==
The Ministry of Information of Belarus was established in 2001 and serves as Belarus' media regulator. Licensing and registration procedures are opaque and politicized. Since 2009 all media outlets, including websites, need to register or face blockage. Independent publications have been forced to use foreign-based internet domains. Outlets that "threaten the state's interests" can also be denied accreditation and shut down.

The government established in February 2009 a Public Coordination Council in the Sphere of Mass Information, aimed at the coordination of interaction of state management, public associations, and other organizations carrying out activities in the sphere of mass information; maintenance of correct application of the law on mass media and other legislation in the sphere of mass information; consideration of the questions as issues from applications to the law on mass media.

Since December 2014, websites can be blocked without a court order after two warnings within 12 months. Mass media status was expanded, and liability for contents was widened to include user comments.

A state commission was established in August 2014 to evaluate whether media outlets contain "extremist" materials, possible to a ban under a 2007 counter-extremism law.

During the 2020 Belarusian protests, the Belarusian edition of Komsomolskaya Pravda newspaper failed to print three editions, and Narodnaja Volya failed to print one newspaper edition (both newspapers had a contract with the government-controlled printing house). The Belarusian Association of Journalists said that the real cause was not technical troubles but an attempt to block information about the protests and violations of human rights. Two other independent newspapers (Belgazeta and Svobodnye Novosti) were also unable to print new editions in Belarus. New editions of Komsomolskaya Pravda and Narodnaja Volya were printed in Russia, but the state network of newsstands, "Belsoyuzpechat'", refused to take them for sale. These newspapers also reported that the post service delayed the delivery by subscription.

In January 2021, Brestskaya Gazeta was forced to stop issuing printed newspapers. In July 2021, the Nasha Niva newspaper was forced to stop activity in Belarus after arrests of its editors. In July 2021, Maladziechna-based Rehiyanalnaya hazieta (Belarusian: Рэгіянальная газета, Regional newspaper) announced that it was forced to stop issuing printed newspapers after searches and interrogation of its employees. In June 2021, the national postal service Belposhta refused to distribute Novy Chas by subscription, and in August 2021, Novy Chas announced that it was forced to stop issuing printed newspapers due to the refusal of all companies to publish it.

== State control over broadcast media ==
The state maintains a virtual monopoly on domestic broadcast media, only the state media broadcasts nationwide, and the content of smaller television and radio stations is tightly restricted. The government has banned most independent and opposition newspapers from being distributed by the state-owned postal and kiosk systems, forcing the papers to sell directly from their newsrooms and use volunteers to deliver copies, but authorities sometimes harass and arrest the private distributors.

The Russian media is allowed to transmit television programming, sell newspapers and conduct journalistic activities in Belarus (though some Russian journalists have been expelled by the Belarusian government), thus giving some members of the public, typically those in large cities with many Russian residents, access to an alternative point of view in the Russian language (nearly all Belarusians understand and most of them speak Russian). Several opposition media outlets broadcast from nearby countries to provide Belarusians alternative points of view. This includes the Belsat TV station and European Radio for Belarus (Eŭrapéjskaje Rádyjo dla Biełarúsi).

In 2014–2015, dozens of freelance journalists were fined for working with foreign media (including Belarusian-language media based in the EU) without official state accreditation from the Foreign Ministry, against Article 22.9(2) of the Belarusian Code on Administrative Offence. Journalists were fined several hundreds of euros for having published through foreign media, rather than based on the content of their work. Computer equipment was also seized. The journalists fined had published on Polish-based Belsat TV, Deutsche Welle. Procedural guarantees, including the hearing of witnesses in court, were reportedly not followed by Belarusian authorities, but appeals were rejected. The prosecution of freelancers was condemned by the Belarusian Association of Journalists, which deemed it a gross violation of the standards of freedom of expression, as well as by the OSCE Representative on Freedom of the Media and by the European Federation of Journalists (EFJ). Since April 2014, 38 freelance journalists have been fined €200-500, totalling over €8,000 - some of them being repeatedly prosecuted and fined.

In 2012, the Belarusan largest state network MTIS stopped broadcasting Euronews for unknown reasons. Euronews was the last independent TV channel available in Belarus.

== Charges, attacks and threats against journalists ==
=== 2010s ===
In 2014 the media environment in Belarus remained extremely restrictive. More than 20 journalists were questioned, warned or fined in 2014 for "illegal production and distribution of media products". Many were targeted for contributing without accreditation to foreign-based media in Poland and Lithuania. Some foreign journalists were refused accreditation at the Ice Hockey World Championships. Some were turned back at the border, others were required to obtain a separate accreditation to cover non-sport-related issues.

Arbitrary detention, arrests and harassment of journalists are the norm in Belarus. Anti-extremism legislation targets independent journalism, including materials deemed contrary to the honour of the President of Belarus. Independent reporting is deterred by the threat of closure of media outlets.

Censorship in Belarus, although prohibited by the country's constitution, is enforced by a number of laws. These include a law that makes insulting the president punishable by up to five years in prison, and another that makes criticizing Belarus abroad punishable by up to two years in prison.

- The Belarusian journalist Andrzej Poczobut has been repeatedly charged with defamation against the President since 2011. In September 2013 the State Prosecutor dropped all charges for lack of evidence and released him from a 3-year suspended sentence.
- In May 2014 the wife of Babruysk-based blogger Aleh Zhalnou was prosecuted for alleged violence against a police officer. Their son was then sentenced to three years in a penal colony and a $5,000 fine for violence against a traffic police officer. Zhalnou himself has faced over a dozen trials, was repeatedly summoned by the police, and had his professional equipment (cameras) confiscated several times.
- In November 2014 the journalist Alyaksandr Alesin of the independent newspaper Belarys i rynok was detained by the State Security Committee (KGB) and then charged with espionage and treason, after he had written about military issues concerning the Russo-Ukrainian War.

=== 2020s ===
Several cases of obstruction of journalistic work by the government were reported before the 2020 presidential election. In Mahilioŭ, Deutsche Welle collaborating journalist Aliaksandr Burakoŭ was arrested on August 5. He was accused of disorderly conduct. Estonian ERR journalist Anton Alekseev reported that he was forced to stop making videos of paddy wagons in the centre of Minsk, being threatened by the possibility of arrest. Anton Trafimovich of Radio Liberty was arrested on July 15 while streaming online, and his nose was broken during the arrest; after quick release, he tried to testify damage, but was arrested again near the hospital. Several other journalists were arrested more than once during the electoral campaign. On July 20, it was estimated that over 40 journalists had been arrested in Belarus in the last two months.

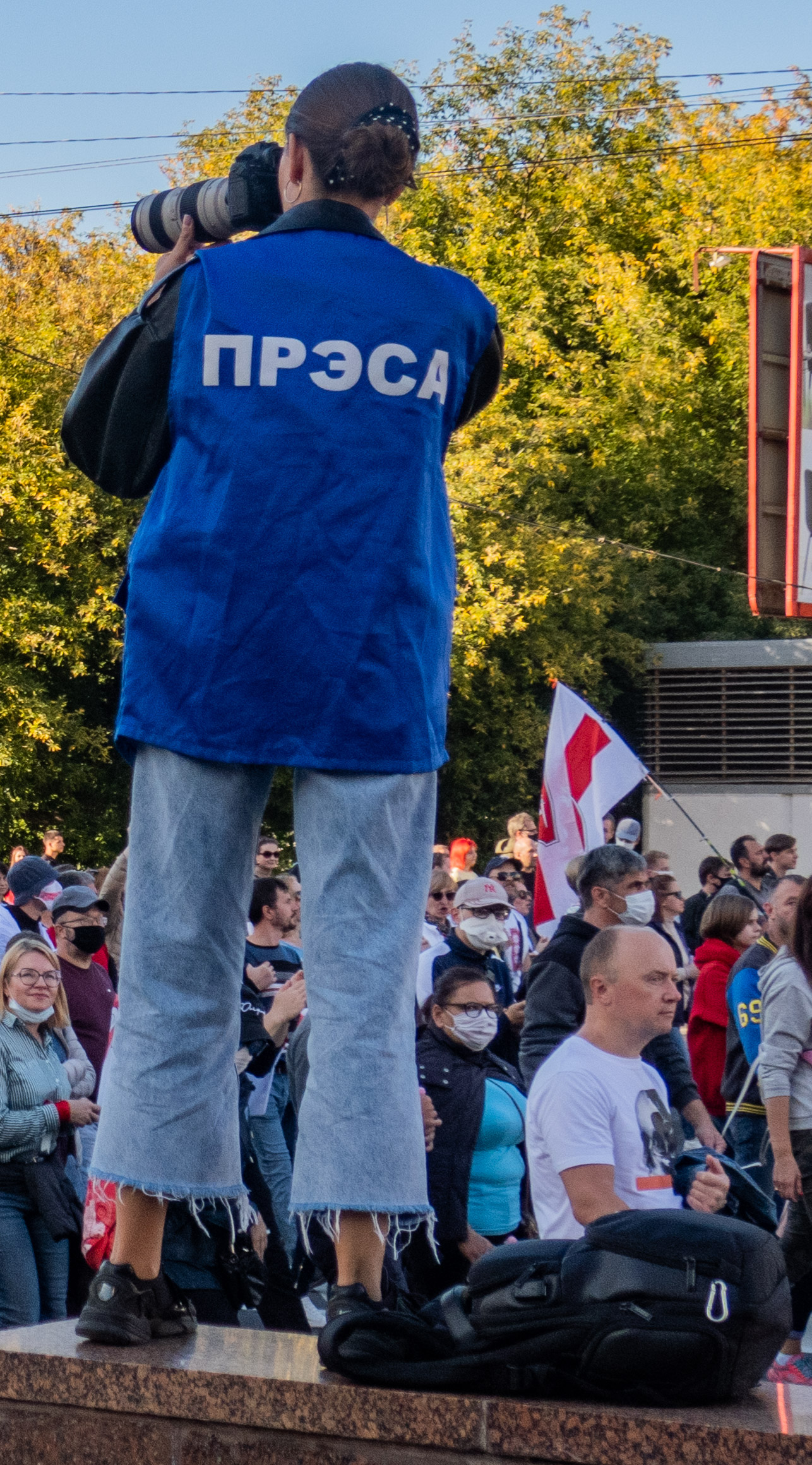
Photojournalist in special jacket with a "Press" inscription covering protests. Minsk, 20 September 2020

During the 2020 Belarusian protests in August after the election, several independent journalists were arrested in different cities of Belarus. According to a statement by the Belarusian Association of Journalists, on August 10 the internal troops and other government forces deliberately shot rubber bullets at the independent journalists in Minsk (including Tut.by and Nasha Niva), who wore special well-visible jackets and had personal IDs. The Nasha Niva editor-in-chief (also wearing a jacket) disappeared during the night, but he managed to send a SOS-SMS to his wife, meaning that he was arrested. His fate was unknown as of 13:30 of local time, and the Nasha Niva site did not have an update for many hours after his presumed arrest. He was released on August 12. Several journalists, including foreigners, were slightly injured during the suppression of the protests. A rubber bullet hit the plastic ID of Getty Images' photojournalist Michal Fridman. Several Russian journalists from both official media and Internet projects were arrested, but quickly released. On August 11, it was reported that the policemen and other government agents forcibly took away memory cards from many journalists covering protests in Minsk and Hrodna and forced them to delete photos or sometimes crushed their cameras (including Tut.by, Nasha Niva and the Associated Press). Journalists from the onliner.by web portal were arrested in Minsk, and their camera was crushed, but they were quickly released. The Russian service of the BBC reported that three of their journalists were beaten by the government forces and one of the accreditation IDs was taken away, but the journalists were not arrested. Russian journalist Nikita Telizhenko was heavily beaten in Belarusian jail: he was arrested in Minsk and sent to Zhodzina because of overcrowding of jails in Minsk; in Zhodzina he was beaten on the kidneys, legs and neck, but he was soon released at the request of the Russian embassy. On August 12, Belsat journalist Jauhien Merkis was arrested in Homiel while covering the protests. Despite the fact that he was there as a journalist, the next day the local court sentenced him to 15 days in jail for "participation in an unauthorized mass event". He was soon freed, but on 21 August was arrested again and given 5 days in jail. Arrested Russian journalist Artyom Vazhenkov was reported to be accused of mass rioting, with a sentence of up to 15 years of prison in Belarus. A journalist from the hrodna.life web portal, Ruslan Kulevich from Hrodna, arrested on August 11, was released on August 14 with fractures of both hands. Belsat journalist Stanislau Ivashkevich, arrested on August 9 in Minsk while covering the election process, claimed that he was forced to go between the lines of some government troopers who beat everyone with heavy police batons. Belsat journalists Dzmitry Kazakevich and Vyachaslau Lazaraŭ, and independent journalist Ihar Matsveeŭ, were arrested in Viciebsk on August 9 while covering the protests. Kazakevich was sentenced to 10 days in jail; Lazaraŭ (operator) was released in 8 hours, but all the videos he made were deleted; Matsveeŭ awaited trial as of August 12. Radio Liberty (Svaboda) journalist Vital' Cyhankoŭ (be) was arrested with his wife in Minsk on August 12; his wife claimed she was threatened with a pistol. A Russian journalist from meduza.io, Maksim Solopov, was beaten and arrested in Minsk on August 9/10, his fate was unknown for nearly two days, but he was released at the request of the Russian embassy. The union of journalists of Russia condemned the use of violence against journalists as unlawful. In Babruysk, a journalist from "Babruyski kur'yer", Andrey Shobin, was fined for "violation of procedure of holding mass events". In Brest, two journalists, Stanislaŭ Korshunaŭ from Tut.by and Siarhei Nikrashevich from Brestskaya Gazeta, were arrested. Another journalist (Yauhen Nikalayevich of media-polesye.by) was arrested in Pinsk.

External image
- Detention of journalists (Minsk, 27 August)

On 27 August, about 50 journalists were taken to the local police department when the anti-Lukashenko protest rally started. They were detained for several hours and their documents and smartphones were checked. Four journalists refused to give access to their mobile devices, and were charged with "participation in an unauthorized mass event". Swedish photojournalist Paul Hansen was deported from Belarus and banned from Belarus for five years. The Belarusian Association of Journalists demanded that this case was investigated, claiming that the article 198 of the Criminal Code ("Obstruction of the legitimate professional activities of a journalist") should be applied. On 29 August, the accreditation of several foreign journalists was revoked; they worked for Radio Free Europe/Radio Liberty, Associated Press, Reuters, BBC, ARD, Radio France Internationale, Deutsche Welle and Current Time TV.

On 1 September, six journalists from Komsomolskaya Pravda newspaper, Tut.by web portal and BelaPAN news agency who covered the protest rally of students in Minsk were detained, initially to check their documents. Later they were charged with "participation in an unauthorized mass event". It was reported that they wore well-visible jackets and had personal IDs. They were also charged with coordination of the protests.

On 18 February 2021, two Belarusian journalists from Polish-based Belsat TV, Katsyaryna Andreeva and Darya Chultsova were sentenced to two years of prison for live coverage of mass protests.

In May 2021, Reporters Without Borders estimated that more than fifty independent journalists had been forced into exile since the 2020 election and twelve had been imprisoned.

In May 2021, a commercial flight carrying journalist Roman Protasevich, his girlfriend Sofia Sapega and 125 other passengers was forced to land in Minsk by the orders of the Belarusian government, following the landing, Protasevich and Sapega was arrested. The incident was condemned by several countries and multinational organisations.

In May 2021, news site Tut.by, which was read by circa 40% of internet users in Belarus, was blocked and several of its journalists were detained. In July 2021, the Nasha Niva news site was blocked and the editors were detained. The editorial office of Radio Free Europe/Radio Liberty in Minsk was searched with doors being broken, and the homes of several of its journalists were also searched. Coverage of these attacks on independent media by state-run TV channels is considered to be an attempt to intimidate people. According to Current Time TV, state-run media made false accusations about the activities of journalists and invented evidences of their guilt without any trial. Amnesty International condemned the attack on NGOs by Belarusian authorities.

On June 29, 2021, the website of the independent media outlet Belarusian Investigative Center was blocked. In October 2022, according to the Minsk city prosecutor's office, information products of the Belarusian Investigative Center, as well as logos containing the abbreviation "BIC" and the words "Belarusian Investigative Center" were recognized as "extremist materials".

In July 2021, registrations of the Belarusian Association of Journalists, the Press Club Belarus and the Belarusian branch of PEN International were revoked as a part of an attack on NGOs.

On 13 August 2021, all content of Tut.by and a new project of its journalists, Zerkalo.io, was declared extremist by the Central district court of Minsk.

As of September 9, 2021, chief editors of the Belarusian biggest independent media are detained and face criminal charges: Marina Zolotova (Tut.by), Irina Levshina (BelaPAN) and Jahor Marcinovič (Nasha Niva).

=== Journalists killed ===
- Alexander Chulanov, sports correspondent for the National State Television, was found dead (having been hit with a blunt object) in his apartment in Minsk on March 1, 1994.
- Dzmitry Zavadski, a cameraman for ORT, disappeared on July 7, 2000. The last time he was seen was at the Minsk National Airport. On March 14, 2002, Valery Ignatovich and Maxim Malik, former members of a special police unit, were convicted and sentenced to life in prison for his abduction. His family claimed that real responsibility lay with the government (the same claim was made by two former employees of the Prosecutor General's Office and was validated by the United States Department of State) and that they were just scapegoats. He was declared dead on November 28, 2003.
- Mykhailo Kolomyets, founder of the Ukrainian News Agency was found hanged near Maladzyechna on October 30, 2002.
- Veronika Cherkasova, a reporter for Solidarnost, was stabbed to death in her apartment in Minsk on October 20, 2004.
- Vasily Grodnikov, a journalist working for Narodnaja Volya, was found dead with a head wound in his apartment in Minsk on October 17, 2005.
- Aleh Byabenin, founder of Charter 97, was found hanged on September 3, 2010, in an area outside Minsk. While authorities claimed it was a suicide, the Committee to Protect Journalists (CPJ) considered it reasonably certain that he was murdered in direct reprisal for his journalistic work.

== Self-censorship ==
The Ministry of Information gave warning to 34 media outlets in 2015 alone. Since an outlet receiving two warnings in a year can be closed, the Belarusian Association of Journalists sees this as a way to encourage self-censorship.

The enormous amount of the defamation fines and payments to officials that can be inflicted by courts also encourages self-censorship.

In 2010 the President issued decree #60 which "provides for registration of all Internet resources, creation of black lists of the web-sites access to which should be blocked, and a number of other restrictive measure". Even if not all of these are used, after that "some popular Internet-media became more cautious and softened their criticism of the government".

== Internet censorship ==
In 2006, 2007, and 2008 Reporters Without Borders (RWB) listed Belarus as an "Internet enemy". In 2009 Belarus moved to RWB's countries "under surveillance" list where it remained in 2010 and 2011. In 2012 Belarus was moved back to the RWB list of Internet Enemies.

The OpenNet Initiative classified Internet filtering in Belarus as selective in the political, social, conflict/security, and Internet tools areas in November 2010.

The Belarus government has moved to second- and third-generation controls to manage its national information space since the 2010s. Control over the Internet is centralized with the government-owned Beltelecom managing the country's Internet gateway. Regulation is heavy with strong state involvement in the telecommunications and media market. Most users who post online media practice a degree of self-censorship prompted by fears of regulatory prosecution. The president has established a strong and elaborate information security policy and has declared his intention to exercise strict control over the Internet under the pretext of national security. The political climate is repressive and opposition leaders and independent journalists are frequently detained and prosecuted.

A new media law that took effect in February 2009 requires domestic and international websites to register with the Information Ministry or be blocked. In August 2010, the Prosecutor General's Office announced its intention to toughen criminal penalties for the dissemination of slanderous information through the Internet. Since 2007, Internet cafe owners have been required to keep records of their customers’ identities and the websites they visit, facilitating inspection by the security services.

On January 6, 2012, a law took effect requiring that all commercial websites selling goods or services to Belarusian citizens to be operated from within the country and under a .by domain name. Moreover, those who provide internet access (including ISPs and Wi-Fi hotspot operators) must register all users, and they must also censor websites on a blacklist covering pornography and other extremist websites.

Bloggers and online journalism used to be almost free, although limited to a very narrow audience; the government has started censoring the web too, since internet penetration has started growing.

In March 2014 Beltelecom blocked the Nasha Niva newspaper website – possibly as a test for the upcoming 2015 presidential elections.

On August 8, 2020, the Internet site afn.by (Agency of Financial News) was blocked by the Ministry of Information for unknown reasons.

On August 9, 2020, during the 2020 Belarusian presidential election and later, protests against Lukashenko-reelection, the Internet in Belarus was partially blocked. According to the government officials, the reason was heavy DDoS-attack, but the independent IT specialists claimed that Belarusian state Internet monopoly Beltelecom and affiliated state agencies deliberately used deep packet inspection (DPI) technology or traffic shaping.

On 21 August, 72 or 73 web sites were blocked in Belarus, including several independent news portals (Radio Liberty/Free Europe in Belarus, svaboda.org, by.tribuna.com sport news, euroradio.fm, belsat.eu, gazetaby.com, the-village.me/news and others), electoral sites of Tsepkalo and Babaryko, "Golos" and "Zubr" platforms, spring96.org human rights portal, several VPN services. Euroradio.fm was ranked 118th most popular site in Belarus, svaboda.org — 133rd, gazetaby.com — 148th, belsat.eu — 158th, tribuna.com — 167th, udf.by — 318th.

On 28 August, the Nasha Niva and naviny.by news web sites were blocked in Belarus.

On 18 May 2021, the most popular independent news site Tut.by was de facto closed by the government: its Internet domain was blocked, the servers were shut off, the main office was sealed. Tut.by management was accused of tax evasion and 15 employees were detained including journalists unrelated to financial issues of the company. On October 28, 2021, all 32 languages versions of Deutsche Welle websites have been blocked in Belarus.

=== Attacks on Wikipedians ===
On 11 March 2022, GUBOPiK, the Belarusian Main Directorate for Combatting Organized Crime and Corruption, detained Wikipedia editor Mark Bernstein in Minsk. Pro-government Telegram channels published a video recording of Bernstein's detention and accused him of spreading fake "anti-Russian" information in relation to the 2022 Russian invasion of Ukraine on Wikipedia.

On 7 April 2022, a local court in Brest sentenced active Wikipedia user Pavel Pernikaŭ to two years of prison for three edits in Wikipedia about censorship of Belarus and deaths during the 2020 protests: two edits in Russian and one edit in Belarusian (Taraškievica). He was found guilty of "committing acts that discredit the Republic of Belarus" (article 369-1 of the Criminal Code of Belarus).

== Cyber-attacks ==
DDoS cyberattacks were reported, in the run-up to the 2015 Presidential election, to the websites of BelaPAN news agency (Belapan.com and Naviny.by) and web portal Tut.by, after they published a critical article about students ordered to attend official events. The Belarusian Association of Journalists expressed concern.

- In July 2014 the EuroBelarus website reported a cyberattack, possibly related to its coverage of the war in Ukraine.
- On 19 December 2014 several Belarusian websites were blocked, including Belapan.by, Naviny.by, Belaruspartisan.org, Charter97.org, Gazetaby.com, Zautra.by, UDF.by. The block extended within 2015.

== Music censorship ==
In the past few years, many Belarusian musicians and rock bands have been unofficially banned from radio and television, have had their concert licenses revoked, and have had their interviews censored in the media. Researchers Maya Medich and Lemez Lovas reported in 2006 that "independent music-making in Belarus today is an increasingly difficult and risky enterprise", and that the Belarusian government "puts pressure on ‘unofficial’ musicians - including ‘banning’ from official media and imposing severe restrictions on live performance."

Belarus government policies tend to divide Belarusian musicians into pro-government "official" and pro-democracy "unofficial" camps. Economic barriers have been placed against various artists, leading to self-censorship.

== In art ==
- Viva Belarus! - the most famous film about the political regime of Alexander Lukashenko, human rights during his rule banned in Belarus.

== See also ==
- Human rights in Belarus
- Telecommunications in Belarus
- Classification of extremist materials in Belarus
