= Detention of Pavel Pernikaŭ =

Detention of a Wikipedia editor in Belarus

On 7 April 2022, Pavel Alexandrovich Pernikaŭ (Belarusian: Павел Аляксандравіч Пернікаў, romanized: Pavyel Alyaksandravich Pyernikaw), (Note: Also known as Pavel Aleksandrovich Pernikov (Russian: Павел Александрович Перников)) a 30-year-old Belarusian human rights activist and Wikipedia editor, was sentenced to two years imprisonment for "discrediting the Republic of Belarus" by making two edits to Wikipedia about political repression in Belarus and posting one article to the website of a human rights organization about torture and extra-judicial killings in Belarusian detention centers. Days after his imprisonment, he was recognized as a political prisoner by Belarusian human rights organizations.

== Background ==
Pavel Alexandrovich Pernikaŭ studied at A.S. Pushkin Brest State University. In 2013, he participated in a student works competition for the 20th anniversary of the World Conference on Human Rights, and received a diploma from the UN office in Belarus.

Pernikaŭ was engaged in human rights activism in the Brest Region. He worked with the Belarusian section of the International Society for Human Rights, and as of 2021, headed its press service. Pernikaŭ had made more than 84,000 edits to Wikipedia from 2014 to 2021, focusing on coverage of the persecution of journalists and media outlets by the Belarusian government, such as detained Komsomolskaya Pravda journalist Gennady Mozheiko, and Tut.By journalist Katsiaryna Barysevich. In 2020 and 2021, Pernikaŭ posted to his social media accounts material about the persecution of independent Belarusian media outlets such as Novy Chas, Intex-Press, and Brestskaya Gazeta, and about Belarusian journalists working in exile after being forced to flee Belarus. His social media posts stopped in the fall of 2021. In December 2021, Pernikaŭ's Wikipedia account was blocked on suspicion that it had been compromised after it was used to make a series of edits removing information about the repression of journalists in Belarus.

== Prosecution ==
On 28 March 2022, the Brest regional prosecutor's office reported that the criminal case of a previously arrested "30-year-old unemployed resident of Brest" had been transferred to court, accused of "committing acts that discredit the Republic of Belarus", a violation of Article 369-1 of the Criminal Code of Belarus, punishable by up to four years in prison. Prosecutors alleged that between 29 December 2020 and 30 April 2021, the defendant had deliberately publicized on Wikipedia and on the website of the International Society for Human Rights "false information about the involvement of the Belarusian authorities in the murder in October 2004 of journalist Veronika Cherkasova, as well as in the torture and murder of people".

On the following day, 29 March 2022, the Brest Regional Court held a closed session to hear Pernikaŭ's grievances regarding "detention, house arrest, extension of the period of detention and house arrest, as well as forced placement in a forensic psychiatric expert hospital."

Pernikaŭ's trial began on 6 April 2022 in the Moscow District court in Brest. At trial, the prosecutor, Elena Tikhanovich, requested that Pernikaŭ be sentenced to two years in prison based on three alleged violations.

First, prosecutors accused Pernikaŭ of adding a paragraph about the murder of Gennady Shutov and the Belarusian authorities' refusal to take responsibility for the deaths of antigovernment protestors to a Belarusian Wikipedia article about deaths related to the 2020–2021 Belarusian protests.

Second, prosecutors accused Pernikaŭ of adding a mention of the 2004 murder of journalist Veronika Cherkasova to a Belarusian Wikipedia article about censorship in Belarus. Prosecutors argued that because Wikipedia already had an article about Cherkasova's murder, Pernikaŭ's addition of the information to a separate article was intended to "discredit" the Belarusian state.

Third, prosecutors accused Pernikaŭ of posting an article about torture and death in Belarusian penal colonies and detention centers on the website of the International Society for Human Rights. Prosecutors argued that because the Belarus Department for the Execution of Punishments reported that they had investigated the claims and were unable to confirm them, adding the information to Wikipedia constituted "discrediting" Belarus.

Pernikaŭ pleaded not guilty. He admitted to making the edits and online posting, but denied that doing so was "discrediting the Republic of Belarus" in violation of the law.

On 7 April 2022, Judge Eugene Bregan found Pernikaŭ guilty of "discrediting the Republic of Belarus" in violation of Article 369-1 of the Belarusian Criminal Code and accepted the prosecutor's recommendation, sentencing Pernikaŭ to two years imprisonment in a penal colony.

According to Viasna Human Rights Centre, Pernikov was released on August 28, 2023.

== Reaction ==
On 11 April 2022, Pernikaŭ (together with 17 other Belarusians) was recognized as a political prisoner by Belarusian human rights organizations Viasna Human Rights Centre, Legal initiative, Belarusian Association of Journalists, Lawtrend, and Barys Zvozskau Belarusian Human Rights House. They called for the immediate release of Pernikaŭ and other political prisoners of Belarus, and for ending the criminal prosecutions against them.

== See also ==
- Detention of Mark Bernstein
- Censorship in Belarus
- Wikipedia and the 2022 Russian invasion of Ukraine
- Blocking of Wikipedia in Russia
- Censorship in Saudi Arabia § Since 2019
- Censorship of Wikipedia
- List of Wikipedia people
- List of people imprisoned for editing Wikipedia
