= Intex-Press =

Belarusian independent local newspaper

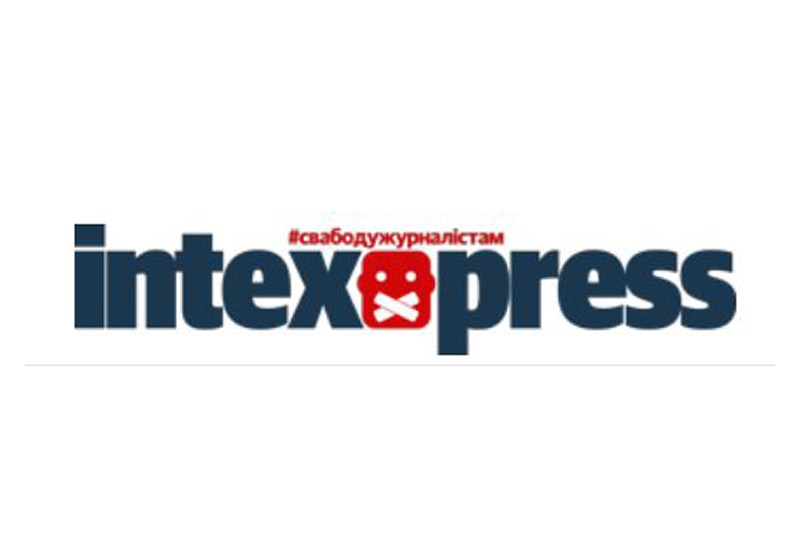
- Type: weekly
- Format: A3
- Publisher: Uladzimir Yanukevich
- Founded: 30th December 1994
- Language: Belarusian and Russian
- Headquarters: Baranavichy, 224A-4 Breskaya Street
- Circulation: 17,300 copies
- ISSN: 1991-9999
- Website: http://www.intex-press.by/

Intex-Press (Интекс-пресс, 17,300 copies) is an independent local newspaper published in Baranovichi, Belarus.

The paper version was banned by authorities in 2021. In 2023, website and social network accounts of Intex-Press were declared 'extremist' in Belarus.

== State pressure ==
On April 15, 2021, the editor-in-chief of the newspaper Vladimir Yanukevich was summoned by the interdistrict prosecutor Alexander Karlyuk and issued a warning of the Baranavichy interdistrict prosecutor's office for an interview with Sviatlana Tsikhanouskaya. On April 26, the court of the Baranovichy District and the city of Baranavichy (judge Nikolay Kmita) fined Yanukevich 20 basic units, as he was accused of violating the law on mass media in the form of disseminating information on the Internet, the dissemination of which is prohibited. On May 4, 2021, the Ministry of Information issued a warning to the editorial office for the interview. On May 5, 2021, the Brest Regional Economic Court (judge Igor Kondratyuk) punished Yanukevich with a fine of 150 base units for the printed version of the interview.

On April 28, 2021, it became known that Belposhta would not include the publication in the subscription catalog for the second half of the year and would not take it for sale in offices. Private retail chains, such as Belmarket, Marcin, Dobronom and others, also refused to sell the newspaper. On May 4, 2021, Belsayuzdruk (the government-run newspaper stand chain) unilaterally refused to sell the newspaper from May 5, 2021, a letter about this was signed by the director of the Brest branch of the state monopoly Tatyana Zinevich. On May 9, 2021, the Belarusian Press House unilaterally refused to print the newspaper, a letter to this effect was signed by Deputy General Director for Production and Ideological Work Yuri Arikhovsky.

Andrey Bastunets, chairman of the Belarusian Association of Journalists, noted that the persecution of Intex-press in all directions was coordinated by someone. OSCE Representative on Freedom of the Media Teresa Ribeiro condemned the pressure on Intex-press to interfere with the work of the media under the pretext of fighting extremism.

On December 29, 2021, Intex-Press website was blocked in Belarus. The website and social networks of the publication were declared extremist resources on April 29, 2023. Under current Belarusian law this label means that even readers of such 'extremist' media outlets face fines and prison terms of up to 7 years for reposting, subscribing or commenting its materials.

In 2022, Intex-Press reporter Yury Hantsarevich was arrested and later sentenced to 2.5 years in prison under extremist charges for sending photos of military aircraft at a Belarusian airbase to Radio Svoboda.

After Intex-Press was banned, former employees created the website BAR24. In December 2024, authorities conducted a search, seized equipment, and opened a criminal case against six employees. Four of them were sentenced in 2025 to restricted freedom without being sent to a correctional facility. In February 2026, former Intex-Press director Vladimir Yanukevich and his deputy were sentenced to lengthy prison terms and fines on charges of treason.
