= Yulia Chernyavskaya =

Belarusian professor, scientist and writer

Julia Chernyavskaya
- Born: Юлія Вісарыёнаўна Чарняўская; 1962 (age 62–63); Minsk
- Occupation(s): Teacher, scientist, writer, dramatist, culturologist
- Spouse: Yuri Zisser

Julia Vissarionovna Chernyavskaya (Belarusian: Юлія Вісарыёнаўна Чарняўская) is a Belarusian scientist, writer, dramatist, culturologist. She was a professor at Belarusian State University of Culture and Arts; Chernyavskaya also hosted cultural programs on Tut.by. She is the founder of GRAPHO, the largest Belarusian literary club, and a laureate of the National Belarusian Theatrical Award. She was married to Tut.by founder Yuri Zisser, though has not been involved in the management of the company. In 2021 she was arrested during a massive state crackdown on independent media. Viasna Human Rights Centre considers her a political prisoner.

== Biography ==
=== Family and career ===
Julia Chernyavskaya was born in Minsk in 1962. Her parents divorced in 1968, the girl was raised by grandparents. Her grandfather Vasil Vitka was a famous writer, as later confessed by Chernyavskaya, he was the one who shaped her cultural taste and affection to books and reading. She grew up in the literary house at Улица Карла Маркса (Минск) street, 36, in front of the famous Janka Kupala National Theatre. Her neighbors were mostly writers and poets, including Uladzimir Karatkievich, Viačasłaŭ Adamčyk, Janka Bryl, Nil Hilevich, and many more.

In 19 years, she met her first husband. They got married very soon, but the marriage ended with a divorce four years later. The split was amicable, they maintained a good relationship. During the period of her divorce Chernyavskaya met Yuri Zisser, who then lived in Lviv. Zisser moved to Minsk to stay with Julia, soon they got married and welcomed a daughter, Eugenia.

In 1984, she graduated from the Faculty of Philology at Belarusian State University, then in 1997 from the Faculty of Cultural Studies at Belarusian State University Republican Institute for Higher Education.

Chernyavskaya writes prose and poetry. She released four novels, including A boy with a dog in 2012. Her play Аднакласнікі staged by Ekaterina Averkova at the Могилёвский областной драматический театр brought her the National Belarusian Theatrical Award in 2012. She launched GRAPHO initiative that grew into the largest Belarusian literary club. In the 2010s, Chernyavkaya was a member of Madeleine Radziwiłł's scholarship committee headed by Svetlana Alexievich.

In August 2020, she joined the Coordination Council for the Transfer of Power.

Chernyavskaya taught at Belarusian State University of Culture and Arts. In 2002, she received a Candidate of Sciences degree. She wrote eight monographs and textbooks and more than 200 scientific articles. As a columnist, she contributed to ‘Ezhednevnik’, ‘Vsemirnaya literatura’, and ‘Et Cetera’ magazines. After more than 30 years of work, Chernyavskaya was forced to resign in 2021, when state censorship began to gain momentum in universities.

=== Arrest ===
Though Chernyavskaya never belonged to Tut.by management and didn’t even have its shares, she was arrested in her apartment on May 18, 2021, on the same day with more than 15 Tut.by employees including ex chief editor Marina Zolotova. Chernyavskaya suffered a stroke and was hospitalized under convoys, for more than 2 days her relatives and colleagues couldn’t contact her. Later Chernyavskaya was put under house arrest under charges of large scale tax evasion. Viasna Human Rights Centre considered her a political prisoner.

According to her daughter Eugenia, during the home arrest Chernyavskaya's health deteriorated drastically. She could barely walk and suffered from pains in her legs and spine.

In April 2022, Chernyavskaya released a collection of her poetry under the title ‘World about you’ (‘Мир о тебе’).

Chernyavskaya was released on January 11, 2023, though the charges against her weren’t dropped.

== Bibliography ==
=== Cultural science ===
- The psychology of national intolerance (‘Психология национальной нетерпимости’), Minsk, Harvest, 1998, ISBN 985-433-265-9
- Ethnic foundations of culture (‘Этнические основания культуры’), 2001
- Introduction to cultural and philosophical anthropology (‘Введение в культурно-философскую антропологию’), 2003
- Belorussian: a hatchet to a self-portrait (‘Белорус: штрихи к автопортрету’), 2006
- Belarusians: from Tuteishy to nation (Белорусы: от тутэйшых - к нации), Minsk, FUAinform, 2010, ISBN 978-985-6868-27-9
- Ethnic Cultural Studies: Concepts, Approaches, Hypotheses (‘Этническая культурология: концепты, подходы, гипотезы’), 2010

=== Fiction ===
- Boy with a dog (‘Мальчик с собакой’), novel, Minsk, Kovcheg, 2011, ISBN 978-985-6950-83-7
- Bukovki (‘Буковки’), play, 2012
