= Brestskaya Gazeta =

Newspaper from Brest, Belarus

- Type: Weekly newspaper
- Format: A3
- Owner: "Brestskaya Gazeta" LLC (Limited Liability Company)
- Editor-in-chief: Viktor Marchuk
- Founded: 18 November 2002
- Political alignment: Independent.
- Language: Russian, Belarusian
- Headquarters: Brest, Kuibyshev street, 13, 8a, 224016, Belarus
- Circulation: 5230 (December 2020)
- Website: bgmedia.site

Brestskaya Gazeta (Russian: Брестская газета) is a non-governmental newspaper from Brest, Belarus. Its first number came on 18 November 2002. The main language of the newspaper and its website is Russian, but some stories are written in Belarusian. Its latest issue is dated 30 December 2020.

== Format and content ==
The first issue of Brestskaya Gazeta was published on 12 pages. The maximum volume during the publication of the newspaper was 40 pages. Brestskaya Gazeta came out weekly on Thursdays. The first and last pages were two-color (black + red).

By the end of 2020, Brestskaya Gazeta was published on 24 pages. The publication has positioned itself as a newspaper for the whole family, which publishes a variety of information not only about Brest and the Brest region, but also about the country and the world as a whole. Each issue had a TV program (38 channels), a crossword puzzle, a horoscope, anecdotes, advertising. The main editorial rule is not to impose its opinion on the reader so that they can draw their own conclusions. The target audience of the newspaper is the younger generation.

== State pressure ==
It has been writing about the 2020 Belarusian protests and 2020 Belarusian presidential election, so several journalists of the Brest newspaper have been tried and arrested for that. In October 2020, the newspaper joined a common statement by the Belarusian Association of Journalists and private media companies on the pressure of TUT.BY and restricting access to independent websites. The newspaper took a strong civil position against violence in covering the Belarusian protests, started subscribing political prisoners to itself, writing them letters and publishing their answers.

At the end of November, it became known that the Brest Regional Printing House, where the newspaper had been printed for all 18 years, for no reason refused to print the outlet starting in 2021; the fax was signed by Vyacheslav Shakhlevich, director of the printing house.

The United Mass Media requested Shakhlevich, the Brest City and Regional Executive Committees, and the Ministry of Information to make possible to change the decision that created "troubles for the well liked private regional publication." Chairman of the Belarusian Association of Journalists Andrey Bastunets said that the troubles made to Brestskaya Gazeta support the government' pressure on the regional news media, as "the fact that this is happening at the level of economic entities should not deceive anyone."

In order to avoid penalties in connection with the non-guaranteed delivery of the circulation, it was ultimately decided to abandon Belpochta's subscription services for the first half of 2021. On 19 January 2021 it became known that Brestskaya Gazeta was temporarily suspending its publication due to the fact that all the Belarusian printing houses refused to print the newspaper.

On 8 July 2021 the office and the apartments of its contributors were searched. The grounds for the raids were unknown, but two days later Brestskaya Gazeta informed that all the technical devices from the office and its journalists' were seized.

A court in Brest added the newspaper’s website to the list of extremist materials in November 2021, and its Telegram channel in April 2022.

In 2023, the KGB designated Brestskaya Gazeta as an extremist group. Participation in an extremist group is a criminal offense under Belarusian law.

== Critical response ==
According to the teacher of the Faculty of Journalism of the Belarusian State University Daniil Shavrov, the newspaper compares favorably with a high share of analytical materials against the background of other publications in the Brest region. Such articles have a different geographic focus, both republican and regional, which makes them potentially interesting for any audience. The columns of the editor-in-chief Viktor Marchuk were positively assessed, articles by a number of other authors of the newspaper are cited as examples. Lawyer and political prisoner Maxim Znak wrote in a letter to the editorial office in January 2021 that he is proud of the newspaper's staff, “which was nearby in the most isolated spaces” and “did not betray themselves, because the newspaper could probably publish something that would be printed but hardly read."

== Awards ==
- Diploma of the Brest Regional Executive Committee "For a constructive approach to covering various spheres of life in the region" (2010).
- The award of the chairman of the Brest regional executive committee "For an active journalistic position" to journalist Zhanna Sidoruk (2011), who handed it over to the family of activist Ivan Stasyuk, who was detained on the eve of the action "Revolution through social networks" and was arrested for 10 days for disorderly conduct and insubordination to police officers.
- Diploma for the first place in the nomination "The best journalistic investigation and feedback from readers" of the competition "The best regional newspaper of the year 2013", organized by the Association of Regional Press Publishers «Belarusian: Аб’яднаныя Масмедыі».
- III degree diploma in the nomination "The best analytical material" of the competition "The best regional newspaper 2015", organized by the Association of publishers of regional press «Belarusian: Аб’яднаныя Масмедыі».
- Victories in the nominations "Best Regional Newspaper of the Year", "Best Journalistic Investigation" (Lyudmila Selekh and Alla Verstova), "Best Social Action of the Year" of the "Best Regional Newspaper 2018" competition organized by the Association of Regional Press Publishers «Belarusian: Аб’яднаныя Масмедыі».
- Winning the nominations "Best Investigative Journalism and Feedback from Readers" (Kristina Goloviychuk for a series of articles about the starving brothers), "Education and Culture" (Irina Shatilo, "I bought antiseptics at my own expense"), "Belarusian language" (Maria Malyavko, for the series of articles «Belarusian: Мова перамен») of the competition of the Association of Publishers of Regional Press «Belarusian: Аб’яднаныя Масмедыі» "The Best Regional Media" in 2020.
