= Marina Zolotova =

Belarusian journalist

- Born: Марына Васільеўна Золатава; 1977 (age 48–49); Minsk
- Education: Belarusian State University
- Occupation: Journalist
- Known for: Chief editor of Tut.by

Marina Zolotova (Belarusian: Марына Васільеўна Золатава) is a Belarusian journalist, chief editor of Tut.by media outlet since 2004. In 2021, she was arrested under charges of large-scale tax evasion; later, political charges were added to her case. She is considered a political prisoner by the European Union, the United States of America, and numerous human rights defenders. On March 17, 2023, she was sentenced to 12 years in prison. She was released and exiled to Ukraine on 13 December 2025.

== Biography ==
=== Early years and family ===
Zolotova was born in Minsk in 1977. She graduated from the BSU Philology department. Zolotova speaks Bulgarian. She worked at the Institute of Science Research, then at the BelaPAN agency.

=== Tut.by ===
In the summer of 2004, Zolotova started working at Tut.by, and soon became the chief editor of the outlet. Under Zolotova Tut.by launched its news block and gradually opened other departments, dedicated to sports, culture, fashion, etc. While in 2004 the site had only 6000 unique visitors per day, by 2020 it had grown into the biggest Belarusian Internet media with more than 50 journalists on staff and a daily audience of more than 600,000.

== Political pressure and arrests ==
=== BelTA case ===
On 7 August 2018, the Investigative Committee of Belarus raided TUT.BY the office in Minsk. Zolotova was arrested on charges of criminal offense for sharing passwords for the paywalled BelTA newsfeed. The other journalists, including Iryna Leushyna were soon released, but Zolotva was found guilty of ‘inaction of an official’ and sentenced to a fine of 300 Base amounts. Notably, the practice of sharing passwords is widespread in Belarusian media, BelTA took very few precautionary measures and never before served as a criminal complainant in court. The "BelTA case" was condemned by the United Nations, EU, US officials and numerous human rights defenders.

=== Arrest in 2021 ===
Following the large scale protests of 2020 after the presidential election, 2021 became the year of massive state crackdown on independent media and journalists. On 18 May 2021, with several other Tut.by employees, Zolotova was arrested under charges of tax evasion. Tut.by was 'punished. by the authorities for covering the protests and publishing. uncensored news while state-controlled media tried to create a fake impression of a calm and undisturbed post-election country. Zolotova was put into the Volodarka pre-trial detention centre. The sad irony is that her grandmother was imprisoned in Volodarka 80 years ago. Elena Ivanovna Nikolaeva, Zolotova's grandmother, was a head doctor in Minsk hospital. During Nazi occupation, she was arrested and sent to forced labour in Germany for hiding and saving Jewish children.

On 14 September 2021, Bundestag deputy Alois Rainer announced taking over the good parenthood for Zolotova.

By 18 June 2022, most employees of Tut.by were released from prison, however, they remained suspects, and most of them have been put on the KGB terrorist list. Although it was initially stated that Zolotova and Chekina would only face economic charges, on 9 January 2023, they were officially accused of "inciting hatred" and "calls for sanctions, other actions aimed at harming the national security of the Republic of Belarus" under chapters 243.2 and 361.3 of the State Criminal Code. Zolotova is denied visits, and the trial is closed. The case is unanimously considered political by her colleagues, the international community and human rights defenders. In late January 2023, Zolotova's lawyer had her license revoked. Despite the woman's 20 years of experience in the field, the bar claimed her to be insufficiently competent.

On March 17, 2023, Minsk City Court sentenced Zolotova and Liudmila Chekina, general director of Tut.by, to 12 years in a general regime penal colony for tax evasion, inciting hatred and calling for actions against the national security of Belarus.

=== Release ===
She was released and exiled to Ukraine on 13 December 2025, after the US deal with the Lukashenko regime, among 123 political prisoners.

== International reactions ==
Zolatava's sentence was condemned by exiled colleagues from Tut.by, opposition leader Sviatlana Tsikhanouskaya, the European Federation of Journalists, the Belarusian Association of Journalists, CPJ and many more. Reporters Without Borders called the sentence "absurd." PEN America stated that Zolotava's sentence is part of the relentless campaign of "the Belarusian government to punish and silence independent media".

In May 2023, BAJ launched the solidarity marathon for imprisoned Belarusian journalists. Along with photos of Andrzej Poczobut, Ihar Losik, and Alexander Mantsevich, participants from all around the world held Zolatava's portrait.
