= Vseti.by =

Belarusian social networking service

- Website type: Social Networking
- Available in: Russian*Belarusian*English
- Owner: ООО «ВСетиБай»
- Creators: Alexey Savik, Dobroslav Metelica, Yauheni Yeutushenka, Alexey Korolev, Dmitry Krylov
- Website: vseti.by
- Commercial: Yes
- Registration: Required;
- Launched: April 20, 2008; 18 years ago

Vseti.by (also known as ВСети) was a Belarusian social networking service.

The resource was originally launched as an additional service to the Vitebsk portal vitebsk.ws, later became an independent project. The founders of Alexey Savik, Alexandr Metelica and Yauheni Yeutushenka, Aleksey Korolev, Dmitry Krylov.

== History ==
=== 2008 ===
- April 7 The Social Network "VSeti" was launched in a test mode, as an additional service to the Vitebsk portal vitebsk.ws.
- 20 April Join the social network "VSeti.by" as a separate project and transfer it to the domain of «vseti.by».

=== 2010 ===
- March 27 to the functional site Add one more opportunity - to provide personal domain name for your page.
- September 8 put into test operation function invitations to the website via SMS.
- September 19 In editing the page, a new tab "Pets».
- Alexander Metelica and Alexey Savik participate in the conference "Business Internet" (off-line the largest event dedicated to the internet and carried out in Belarus since 2006), where the founders VSeti.by first publicly spoke about the achievements of your project.

=== 2011 ===
- February 16 The base of "VSeti.by».
- March 16 Site Vseti.by was unavailable most of the day. The technical part of the project moved to Minsk, due to the lack of resources link Vitebsk data center "Beltelecom».
- November 7 radio to his team was able to establish anyone.

=== 2012 ===
- February 7 complicate the authorization on the site.
- February 13 has its first application on the website.
- March 17 Participation as experts in Vitebsk InvestUikende (non-profit event, a business forum aimed at increasing the number of innovative business projects, the implementation of breakthrough business ideas and implementation of technologies, support for innovators, inventors and start-up entrepreneurs, to attract business investment projects and companies in the early stages of development).
- 4 June launched the first test version of the service Videoavatarki (paid service)
- June 13 at 16:00 Minsk time millionth user. It was Anna Kachan, ninth-grader from Logoysk.
- October 11 replaced favicon of the site. Now this silver ladybug depicted in dark-green background.

=== 2014 ===
- November 21 Founders vseti.by announced the closure of the project. The main reason - uncompetitive
- November 30 have been disabled server, but the main page of the project works. It displays the Belarusian news portal TUT.BY.

=== 2022 ===
- The social network has resumed its work
- VSeti creates its own music streaming service for Belarusian musicians called VSound
