= Wikipedia and the Russo-Ukrainian war =

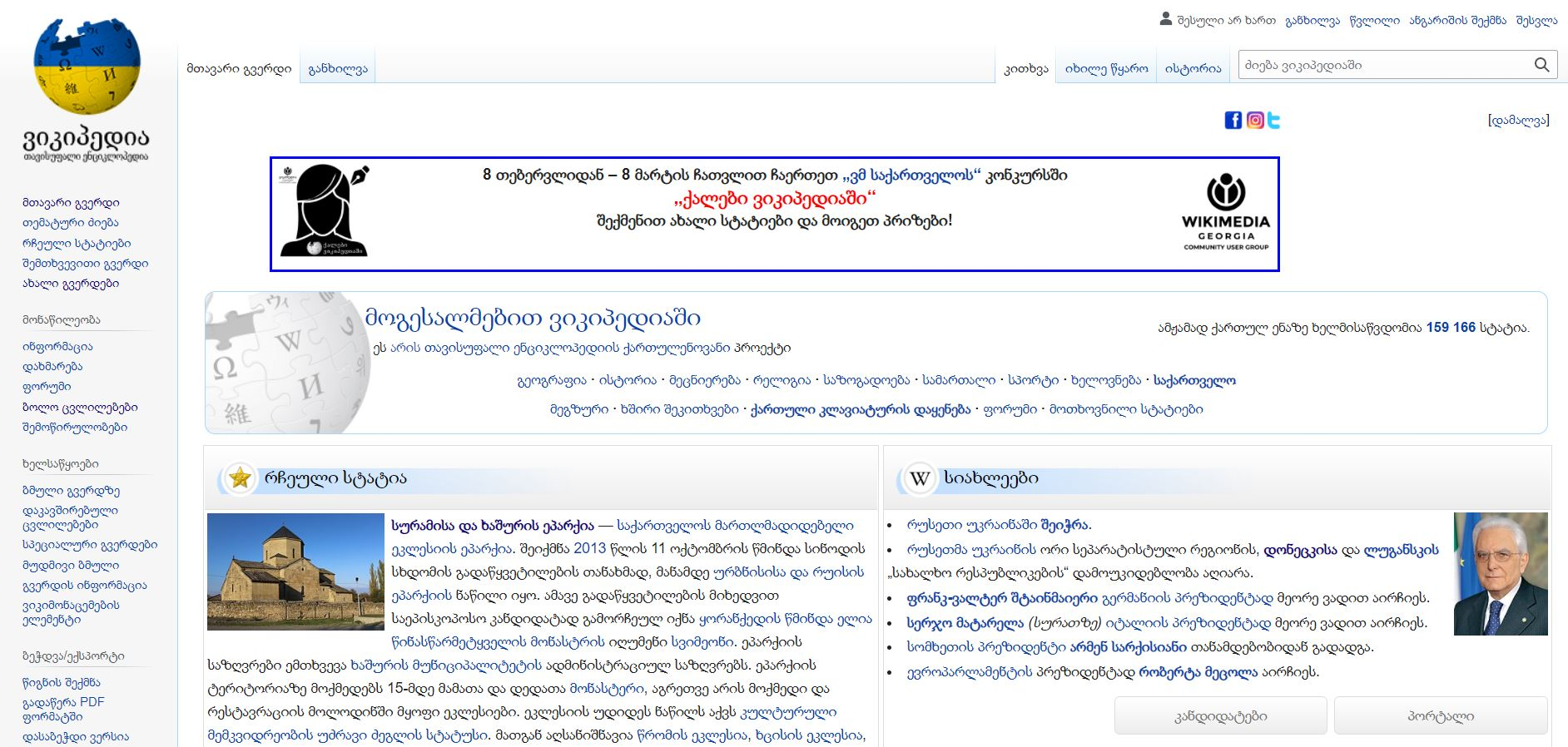
Screenshot of Georgian Wikipedia's Main Page displaying its logo in Ukrainian national colors in February 2022

The Russo-Ukrainian war is extensively covered on Wikipedia across many languages. This coverage includes articles on and related to the invasion itself, and updates of previously existing articles to take the invasion into account. Wikipedia and other Wikimedia projects' coverage of the conflict – and how the volunteer editing community achieved that coverage – has received significant media and government attention.

== History ==
On 1 March 2022, one week after Russia launched an invasion of Ukraine, the Russian Wikipedia announced that the Russian government's media regulator Roskomnadzor had threatened to block access to Wikipedia in the country. The Russian government cited "illegally distributed information" present on the Russian Wikipedia article of the invasion, including Russian casualties and treatment of Ukrainian civilians. Local downloads of the Russian Wikipedia for offline use from Kiwix increased by over 4,000% following the beginning of the invasion amid fears of a Russian block, and over 105,000 downloads had been made during the first half of March.

In Belarus, Russian Wikipedia editor Mark Bernstein was arrested after having been doxxed (having his personal identity revealed) in relation to his editing and writing about the invasion. Bernstein was detained in the Okrestina detention center, and received a sentence of restricted freedom for three years in June for "organizing and preparing activities that disrupt social order". Other editors writing about the war have also been targeted by threats on social media after being doxxed.

On 16 March 2022, the Russian Agency of Legal and Judicial Information (news agency founded by the RIA Novosti, the Constitutional Court of Russia, the Supreme Court of Russia, and the High Court of Arbitration of Russia in 2009) published an interview of Alexander Malkevich, the deputy chairman of the commission on the development of information society, media and mass communications of the Civic Chamber of the Russian Federation. In this interview, Malkevich said that Wikipedia (both Russian and others) was becoming a "bridgehead for informational war against Russia". He also stated that Russian law-enforcement agencies had identified thirteen persons who were carrying out "politically engaged editing" of Wikipedia's articles, and about 30,000 bloggers "participating in informational war against Russia".

According to Novaya Gazeta, pro-Kremlin structures related to Yevgeny Prigozhin are actively involved in doxing "coordinators of an informational attack on Russia", including Wikipedia editors. Novaya Gazeta also reports that Special Communications Service of Russia (a division of the Federal Protective Service) employees are trying to disseminate pro-Kremlin propaganda by editing Wikipedia articles.

On 31 March, Roskomnadzor demanded that Wikipedia remove any information about the invasion that is "misinforming" Russians, or it could face a fine of up to 4 million rubles (approximately $49,000 or $47,000). In June 2022, the Wikimedia Foundation appealed the fine, arguing that people in Russia have the right to access knowledge about the invasion.

In April 2022, EU vs Disinfo found that four pro-Russian disinformation outlets were referenced in at least 625 Wikipedia articles. Most of these references were in the Russian Wikipedia (136 articles), Arabic Wikipedia (70), Spanish Wikipedia (52), Portuguese Wikipedia (45) and Vietnamese Wikipedia (32). The English Wikipedia has removed most references to these outlets and blacklisted two of the websites, SouthFront and NewsFront.

In April–May 2022, the Russian authorities put several Wikipedia articles on their list of forbidden sites. The list included the articles Russian invasion of Ukraine, Rashism, several articles in Russian Wikipedia devoted to the military action and war crimes during the Russo-Ukrainian War, and two sections of the Russian article about Vladimir Putin.

In May 2022, the Wikimedia Foundation was fined 5 million rubles for articles about the Russian invasion of Ukraine. Russia claimed to have uncovered 16.6 million messages spreading "fakes" about the invasion on platforms including Wikipedia. The Wikimedia Foundation appealed the ruling in June, stating the "information at issue is fact-based and verified by volunteers who continuously edit and improve articles on the site; its removal would therefore constitute a violation of people's rights to free expression and access to knowledge."

On 20 July 2022, due to the refusal of Wikipedia to remove the articles about the Russian-Ukrainian war, Roskomnadzor ordered search engines to mark Wikipedia as a violator of Russian laws.

On 1 November 2022, the Wikimedia Foundation was fined 2 million rubles by a Russian court for not deleting two articles on the Russian Wikipedia.

On 28 February 2023, the Wikimedia Foundation was fined 2 million rubles by a Moscow court for not deleting articles about two brigades of the Russian army and for spreading supposedly unreliable information about the activity of the Russian army in Kharkiv, Lysychansk and Mariupol during the invasion. On 6 April 2023, the same court fined the Foundation 800 thousand rubles for not deleting the lyrics of several songs by the rock band Psychea, which are included in the Federal List of Extremist Materials. On 13 April 2023, the same court fined the Foundation 2 million rubles for not deleting the Russian-language article about the Russian occupation of Zaporizhzhia Oblast.

== Responses from Wikipedia ==
The Georgian and Ukrainian Wikipedias changed their logos to reflect the blue and gold coloring of Ukraine's flag.

The Wikimedia Foundation released a statement on 1 March 2022, calling for "continued access to free and open knowledge" and for "an immediate and peaceful resolution to the conflict".

== See also ==
- Block of Wikipedia in Russia
- Ruwiki (Wikipedia fork)
- Censorship in Russia
- Censorship of Wikipedia § Russia
- Detention of Pavel Pernikaŭ
- Wikipedia and the Israeli–Palestinian conflict
