= Nadezhda Azhgikhina =

Russian journalist

Nadezhda Azhgikhina PhD
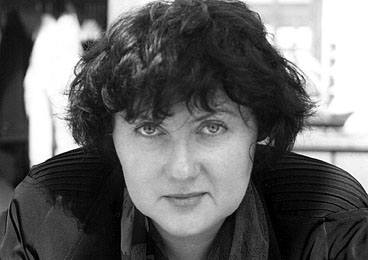
- Azhgikhina in 2008
- Born: Tomsk, Russia
- Other name: Nadia Azhgikhina
- Education: Faculty of Journalism at Moscow State University (PhD) 1990
- Occupation: Journalist
- Awards: Swedish North Star order Armenian Dink; Diploma of AWSS for development of Russian- American cooperation

Nadezhda Azhgikhina is a Russian journalist and executive director of PEN Moscow since 2018. From 2013 to 2019, she was vice-president of the European Federation of Journalists. Azhgikhina is a member of the Russian Writers Union, serving it as Executive Secretary, and the Gender Council of the International Federation of Journalists.

She was born in Tomsk.

Azhgikhina was a staff journalist for Ogoniok from 1990 to 1996, then Nezavisimaya Gazeta from 1996 to 2001. She writes a personal column in Delovoy Vtornik. She was the Russian editor for We/Myi Magazine from 1996 to 2003.

In 1992, with Irina Jurna, she founded the Association of Russian Women Journalists.

She graduated from the Faculty of Journalism at Moscow State University with a PhD in 1990, and now teaches at it.
