= Iryna Leushyna =

Belarusian journalist (born 1965)

- Ірына Леўшына
- Born: 29 November 1965 (age 60); Byelorussian SSR, Soviet Union
- Citizenship: Belarus
- Occupation: Journalist
- Years active: 1992–present
- Employer: BelaPAN
- Criminal charges: Leading an extremist organisation
- Criminal penalty: Four years in prison
- Criminal status: Released

Iryna Alehauna Leushyna (Note: In this name that follows East Slavic naming customs, the patronymic is Alehauna and the family name is Leushyna.) (Belarusian: Ірына Алегаўна Леўшына; born 29 November 1965) is a Belarusian journalist. She is the editor-in-chief and director of the independent news agency BelaPAN, for which she was named Journalist of the Year in 2018. Leushyna was imprisoned between 2021 and 2024 on charges of leading an "extremist organisation".

== Biography ==
Leushyna studied journalism at university before getting married and having children. She worked part-time for the newspapers Schastlivy sluchay and Respublika, but struggled to find full-time work due to her having a child. In 1992, she began working for BelaPAN as a news editor. In 2018, following the death of the agency's founder, Ales Lipai, Leushyna became BelaPAN's director.

On 8 August 2018, Leushyna was among 15 journalists detained for 48 hours after being accused of stealing reports from the official state news agency, BelTA, causing alleged financial losses of up to 7000 BYN. Leushuyna's computer was confiscated and her home was searched. The detention of Leushyna and others was condemned by international organisations including the Organization for Security and Co-operation in Europe, the European Union, the Council of Europe and Reporters Without Borders. Later that month, Leushyna was banned from leaving Belarus. In November 2018, the charges against all of the journalists were dropped with the exception of Marina Zolotova, but they were ordered to pay damages of 12, 000 BYN and fines of 735 BYN. On 30 November 2018, Leushyna was named "Journalist of the Year" by the National Awards for Achievements in the Field of Human Rights, alongside Tatyana Karavyankova and Alyaksandr Tamkovich, for ensuring human rights news did not disappear from the public sphere.

On 18 August 2021, police officers raided the offices of BelaPAN, seizing its servers and blocking its website, and arresting Leushyna and several other employees on charges of "financially supporting protests" and "organisation and active participation in actions that grossly violate public order". On 19 August, Leushyna and the other arrested BelaPAN employees were recognised as political prisoners in a joint statement by 10 human rights organisations, including Viasna, the Belarusian Association of Journalists, the Belarusian Helsinki Committee, the Belarusian PEN Centre, and Pravavaya initsyyatyva.

In November 2021, the Belarusian KGB named BelaPan as an extremist organisation. Leushyna's trial started on 6 June 2022, with the charges against her being reclassified as "establishing and organising an extremist organisation". On 6 October 2022, the Minsk District Court sentenced her to four years imprisonment and a fine of 26, 500 BYN; subsequent appeals were rejected on 6 October 2022 and 6 January 2023 by the Supreme Court. The Ministry of Internal Affairs added Leushyna to its list of Belarusian citizens involved in extremist activities.

Leushyna served her sentence at Women's Prison No. 4 in Gomel. She was released on 7 December 2024 after serving three years, three months and three weeks of her sentence.
