= Pozirk =

News agency in Belarus

Pozirk (/pózirk/, Belarusian: Позірк) is a Belarusian independent news agency reporting in Russian, Belarusian and English, founded by former employees of BelaPAN and its online newspaper Naviny.by.

== History ==
On October 16, 2023, Pozirk launched the website Pozirk.online. However, on December 5 of the same year, the Central District Court in Minsk declared the website "extremist material". Since February 2024, users in Belarus can only access it through VPN services.

On December 19, 2024, the Belarusian Ministry of Internal Affairs designated the whole Pozirk news agency as an extremist group.

BelaPAN journalists and editors were forced to flee Belarus as the government banned the country's oldest independent news agency in 2021.

== Name ==
"Pozirk" means "look", "glance" or "gaze" in Belarusian.
