= Zhanna Litvina =

Free speech activist

- Born: August 30, 1954 (age 72); Minsk
- Education: Belarusian State University
- Occupation: Free Speech Activist
- Years active: 1976–present

Zhanna Litvina (born August 30, 1954) a Belarusian journalist and free speech activist. From 1995 to 2015, she served as chairman of the Belarusian Association of Journalists.

== Biography ==
Litvina was born in the Vadapoj near Minsk. She studied journalism at the Belarusian State University. After graduating she worked as an editor of youth programming at the Belarusian state television station for the better part of 20 years before being dismissed. Following her termination, Litvina and her associates created and operated their own independent news and music station Radio 101.2, only to have it closed by the state in 1996. The closure encouraged Litvina to move the operation out of the country, and she continued to broadcast from Poland, so as to avoid the ire of the Belarusian government and belie the possibility of shutdown.

=== Belarusian Association of Journalists ===
Litvina co-founded the Belarusian Association of Journalists in 1995. The Association was established to protect the rights of journalists in Belarus and to support freedom of speech, access to information, and provide legal assistance to journalists who are harassed by the authorities. In 2015, Litvina stepped down, succeeded by Andrey Bastunets.

=== Awards ===
- In 2003 she was a Golden Pen recipient. She was awarded for her journalism and "courageous resistance to the repression of the media by President Aleksander Lukashenko";
- In 2004 she was awarded the Louis Lyons Award for Conscience and Integrity in Journalism;
- In 2008 she received the Ebert Foundation's Human Rights Award;
- In June 2011 she received the Atlantic Council Freedom Award.
