= Postage stamps and postal history of Belarus =

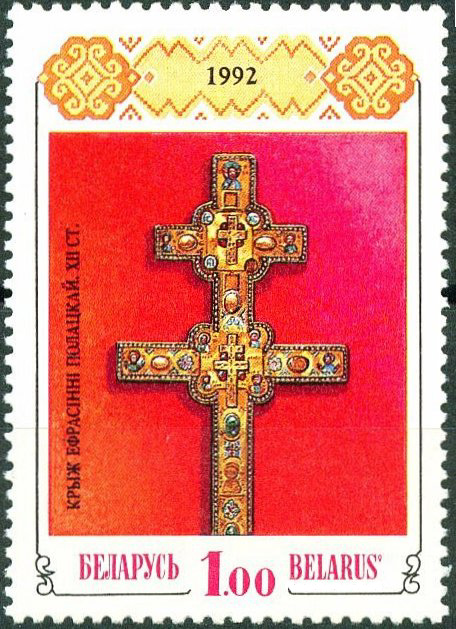
An early stamp produced by independent Belarus in 1992 which depicts the Cross of Saint Euphrosyne

Until 1991, Belarus used the postage stamps and pre-paid stationary of the Soviet Union. In 1991, after the dissolution of the Soviet Union, Belarus became an independent nation and began its own postal administration in 1992.

== Post-Soviet Union stamps ==
Belarus' first issue of postage stamps was put into circulation on 21 December 1992. Stamps issued by the Soviet Union remained in circulation until 1993.

In connection with the 1995 national emblem change, a second issue of stamps was released. The Standard Edition consisted of 180, 280, and 600 rubles, which was replaced by the coat of arms, and a view of Victory Square in Minsk. In 1996, an additional mark of 200 rubles was released (dated 1995). The 2001 edition marks the second part of the standard-issue was overprinted new value (1000 rubles).

The third standard issue stamps consisted of the image of the sample from May 14 1995's emblem, and was issued in 1996–1997. In 1997, the issue of stamps was carried out with the date 1996.

The fourth standard issue postal mark was issued between 1998 and 2003. The main inspiration of the series was "ethnographic subjects."

The fifth standard issue postal mark was issued between 2002 and 2007. The main inspiration was the image of landmarks (except the 1000-ruble mark, which depicted a personal coat of arms Skarina). In 2002, the face value of stamps was issued in 1000, 2000, 3000, and 5000 rubles and lettered with the nominal value image (H, C). In 2006, the mark of 3,000 rubles was reissued with a changed pattern in the new color. In 2007 Belarus re-released 2000 rubles.

The sixth standard edition "flowers," square format, was implemented in 2002.

The seventh standard issue consisting of images of berries was issued in 2004. The eighth standard issue was released in 2004, and was inspired by "wild trees". In 2006, the ninth edition "birds", was issued. In 2007, the tenth edition "beasts," with the format of the diamond, was released. The same theme was repeated in 2008, but in the "book" format. 2008 was also the year that issued the "flowers," in the "book" format.

In January 2012, the issue theme was "national pattern". In March 2012, the issue theme was "monuments". The first release of these stamps was different from the re-issue, specifically the type of paper on which they are printed.

In February 2019, four commemorative stamps were released for the 2019 European Games, to be held in Minsk in June that year.

== See also ==
- Belpochta
