= Beltelecom =

Operator of Belarus for the provision of telecommunication services

Coordinates: 53°54′7″N 27°33′33″E

Beltelekom
- Native name: Белтэлекам (Belarusian) Белтелеком (Russian)
- Type: Unitary enterprise
- Industry: Telecommunications
- Founded: 1995; 31 years ago
- Headquarters: Minsk, Belarus
- Area served: Belarus
- Key people: Yuri Petruchenya (General Director)
- Products: inpatient services, long-distance and international communication, data transmission, IPTV, Wi-Fi
- Owner: Government of Belarus (100%)
- Number of employees: 25,000
- Subsidiaries: MTS
- ASN: 6697
- Peering policy: Open
- Traffic Levels: Not disclosed
- Website: www.beltelecom.by

Republican unitary enterprise Beltelecom (Belarusian: Рэспубліканскае ўнітарнае прадпрыемства электрасувязі Белтэлекам; Russian: Республиканское унитарное предприятие электросвязи Белтелеком) is the national telecommunications company in Belarus, fully owned by the Government of Belarus and operated by the Ministry of Telecommunications. Beltelecom has a network of fiber-optic trunk lines and is the sole provider of fixed telephony in Belarus. It provides long-distance and international calls, and broadband access to the Internet via ADSL, and Wi-Fi services.
