= Georgian Wikipedia =

Georgian-language edition of Wikipedia

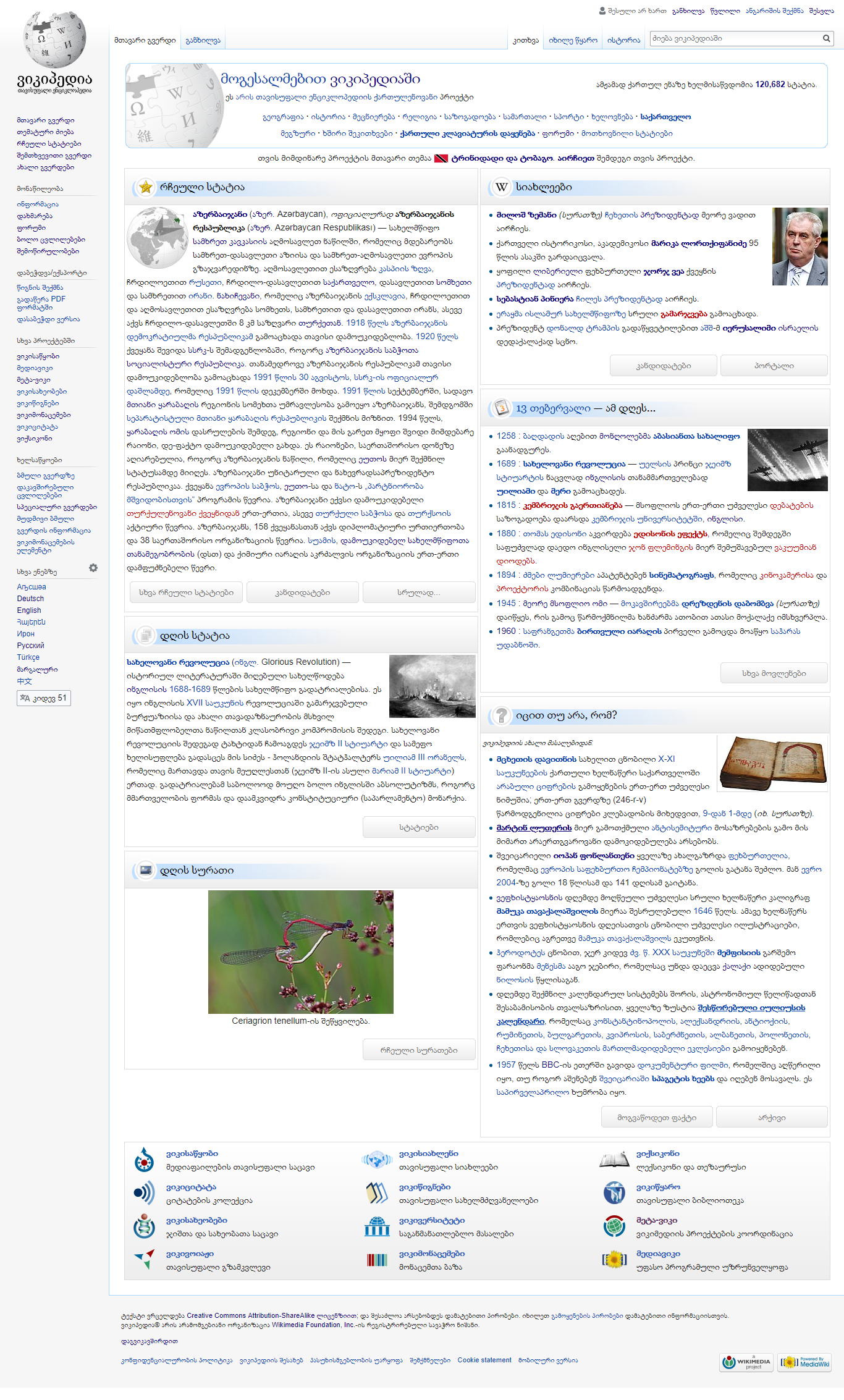
- Screenshot Main page of the Georgian Wikipedia in May 2008
- Website type: Internet encyclopedia project
- Available in: Georgian
- Owner: Wikimedia Foundation
- Website: ka.wikipedia.org
- Commercial: Charitable
- Registration: Optional (required to create articles)
- Launched: November 2003
- Content license: Creative Commons Attribution/ Share-Alike 4.0 (most text also dual-licensed under GFDL); Media licensing varies

The Georgian Wikipedia (Georgian: ქართული ვიკიპედია, romanized: kartuli vik'ip'edia) is a Georgian language edition of free online encyclopedia Wikipedia. Founded in November 2003, it has 201,317 articles as of 8 November 2026.

== Statistics ==
Currently, it has 6 administrators and more than 150,000 registered users.

Number of articles	Date
10,000	2006
23,000	2008
30,000	2009
50,000	2011
70,000	2013
100,000	2015
150,000	2020
200,000	2026

== History ==
The idea of creating a separate Georgian Wikipedia project came to Avtandil Abuladze in 2003, who had been working on the Esperanto Wikipedia since 2002. Subsequently, the creation of the Georgian Wikipedia was worked on by the Portuguese user Malafaya. On February 25 of 2004, the first article of the Georgian Wikipedia was written by the Hong Kong user Tomchiukc.

=== Logo ===
In 2014, the Georgian Wikipedia changed its logo to reflect the blue and gold coloring of Ukraine's flag in response to the Russian occupation of Crimea. In early 2022, the Georgian Wikipedia again changed its logo to reflect the blue and gold coloring of Ukraine's flag in response to the Russian invasion of Ukraine.

== See also ==
- Georgian language
- List of Wikipedias
