= Administrative Code of Belarus =

The Administrative Code of Belarus is the set of laws that codify administrative law in Belarus.

== History ==
The Belarusian administrative code was updated on 1 March 2021, strengthening penalties for several actions in relation to civil disobedience.

== Offences ==
=== Civil disobedience ===
The Code of Administrative Offences was changed on 1 March 2021. Chapter 24 of the 2021 code includes several articles commonly used to prosecute participants in protests and other public-order offences. Under Article 24.23, "violation of the order of organizing or holding mass events" is punishable by a fine, fine, community service, or administrative detention. The community service can be from 8 to 60 hours.

Disobedience to a lawful demand of an official, in practice during political protests, is punishable under Article 24.3. The "illegal use and manufacture of flags and symbols" is punishable under Article 24.26.

=== Bodily harm ===
The intentional infliction of bodily harm or other violence that causes insignificant injury is publishable by a fine or administrative arrest under Article 9.1 of the code.

== Fairness of trials ==
As of 2022, court cases in Belarus are often scheduled ten minutes apart from one another and can conclude in as little three minutes, and have been criticized for being "not a court". Consistently from 2016 through 2020, trials resulting in a guilty verdict occurred at a frequency of 99.7% and 99.8%.

== See also ==
- Criminal Code of Belarus
- Show trial
