= Yuri Zisser =

Belarusian businessman (1960–2020)

- Юрый Анатольевіч Зісер
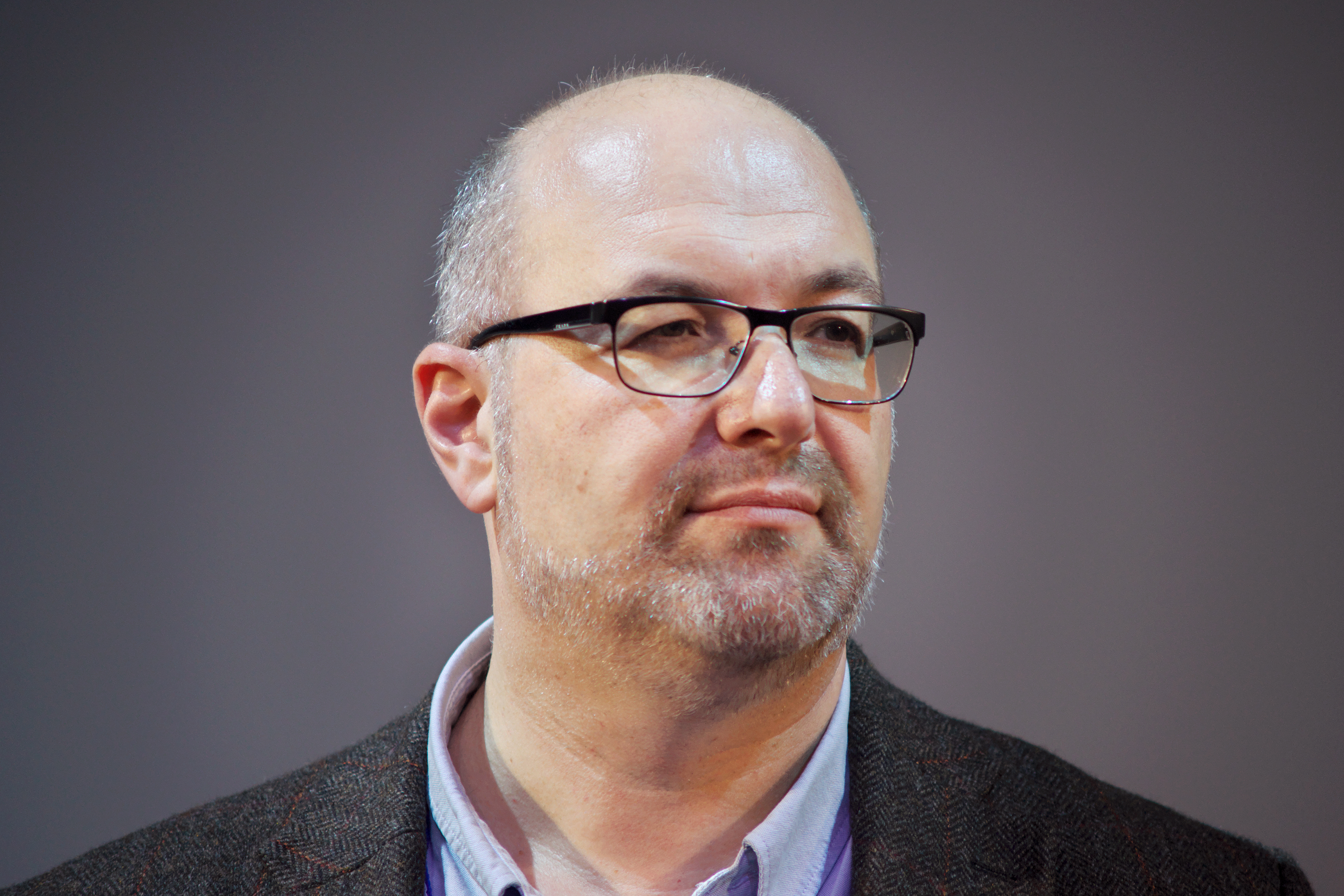
- Zisser in 2015
- Born: June 28, 1960; Lviv, USSR
- Died: May 17, 2020 (aged 59); Minsk, Belarus
- Citizenship: Belarus
- Occupation: entrepreneur
- Known for: Tut.by

Yuri Zisser (Belarusian: Юрый Анатольевіч Зісер, Russian: Юрий Анатольевич Зиссер, June 28, 1960 – May 17, 2020) was a Belarusian programmer and entrepreneur, known as a founder and owner of TUT.by, the most visited Belarusian web portal.

== Biography ==
Yuri Zisser was born in a Jewish family in Lviv, Ukraine and graduated from the North Western Polytechnic Institute in Leningrad. In 1987 he moved to Minsk, Belarus. In 1992 he established the company Nadezhnye programmy (Russian: УП "Надёжные программы").

He has been one of the most frequent members of the jury of the social projects competition SocialWeekend.

He was author of several books on Internet marketing and software marketing.

He died due to stomach cancer complications.
