= Veronika Cherkasova =

Belarusian journalist

Veronika Cherkasova (Belarusian: Вераніка Анатольеўна Чаркасава, Vieranika Anatoljeŭna Čarkasava; Russian: Вероника Анатольевна Черкасова; January 12, 1959 – October 20, 2004) was a Belarusian journalist. She was killed on October 20, 2004. As of 2021, the killer has not been found.

== Biography ==
Veronika Cherkasova was born in Minsk, Belarus, January 12, 1959. She worked on TV in the 1980s, after the dissolution of the Soviet Union she worked for various independent opposition newspapers: "Belorusskaya Delovaya Gazeta" (in the 1990s), "BelGazeta" (1995–2003) and, finally, in 2003–2004 for "Salidarnaść" (Solidarity) newspaper. Later she specialized in investigative journalism and wrote about social issues, including articles about religious sects and Romani communities in Belarus, but also she published several articles about illegal arms trade between Alexander Lukashenko's Belarus and Saddam Hussein's Iraq. She visited Iraq in 2002 as a member of a journalists' group invited to the country by a Belarusian businessmen who had partners in Iraq.

== Murder ==
Cherkasova was murdered in her Minsk apartment on October 20, 2004. She received more than 40 stabs, mostly in the throat and hands. Her body was discovered by her teenage son Anton Filimonov and step-father Vladimir Melezhko, when Cherkasova’s mother got worried that the daughter did not show up at work and did not answer phone calls.

The killer has never been found. No signs of break-in were found, presumably, Cherkasova opened the door herself. The journalists who witnessed the start of investigative actions recall that policemen said “We’ve got to take the pioneer” meaning Veronika’s son. The boy was questioned without lawyer or relatives, threatened, pressured and had to flee to Moscow to his father Dmitry Filimonov. When he was notified that no charges would be pressed on him, the boy returned to Minsk and was arrested for allegedly forging currency. He was released on bail in April 2006. Anton Filimonov developed severe depression and was hospitalized to psychiatric hospital. Cherkasova’s step-father was also pressured by the investigators who tried to make him confess in the murder. World Association of News Publishers, IFEX and other international organizations condemned harassment of Cherkasova’s family and urged Belarusian authorities to make the case's investigation clear and fair.

The official investigation was suspended in December 2005, restarted in February 2006, and suspended again on March 14, 2006, citing lack of indictable suspects. Authorities have never agreed to link Cherkasova’s murder to her professional activities. According to the RSF, the investigation ignored crucial evidence that proved the killing to be connected with her work. According to the journalists, the only things that disappeared from her flat were some photos taken during the last trip to Iraq.

On October 19, 2012, a group of unidentified people tried to break into the Minsk apartment where Cherkasova’s mother, father and son live. The family stated that they experienced multiple visits of the police since 2004, their home was searched in 2008.

As of 2021, the case is still not solved and the murderer has not been found.
