= BelaPAN =

Belarusian independent news agency

BelaPAN БелаПАН
- Industry: News agency
- Founded: 19 November 1991
- Founders: Aleś Lipaj, Vital Cyhankoŭ
- Headquarters: Minsk, Belarus
- Website: belapan.by

The Belarusian Private News Agency or shortly BelaPAN (Belarusian: БелаПАН) is a non-governmental independent Belarusian news agency, one of the main in the country. BelaPAN provides news on politics, economy, and sports from Belarus in Russian, Belarusian and English. The staff includes a wide net of reporters and correspondents.

The company also runs projects related to advertising, elections monitoring, etc. BelaPAN owns the on-line newspaper Belorusskiye Novosti.

Since 2004, BelaPAN is the only Belarusian representative in the CEE-BusinessLine. According to Media IQ in 2019, BelaPAN had the highest rating of being clear from state propaganda. The agency is characterized by a well-balanced, objective and impartial coverage of current events both on Eastern and Western political spheres.

== History ==
=== Foundation and early years ===
The agency was founded on November 19, 1991, by journalists Aleś Lipaj and Vital Cyhankoŭ. In 1992 Iryna Leŭšyna joined the team, as of 2020 she is the editor-in-chief. In her recollections, BelaPAN’s first office was located at Bryleŭski blind alley in a small wooden building with an outhouse. The office had only one PC, one fax machine and three work desks. Apart from Levašava and Lipaj, the staff included three more employees, they printed the news and on foot brought them to editors offices of Minsk newspapers.

Gradually the company grew and in 1996 it rented the office from BelTA. In the early 2000s, it launched Отдыхай (‘Rest’ in Russian) newspaper, but soon the project had to be shut down due to low profitability. By 2001 six of nine Minsk FM radio stations worked on a news feed, provided by BelaPAN. In 2002 the agency included analytical, advertisement, publishing, social, and web design departments.

On the 1st of 2002 BelaPAN launched the web newspaper ‘Belorusskiye novosti’ (Naviny.by). It became the first in ByNet and Belarus. Unlike paper ones, it published the news to the day.

In 2007 the separate editors office for multimedia was launched, in July of the same year first infographics was introduced. By 2008 at least 100 news articles were published in BelaPAN's feed, the company had a monitoring service and an advertising agency.

Through the years, BelaPAN’s journalists were numerous times arrested, questioned in the state General Prosecutor’s Office, obstructed in the discharge of professional duties.

=== 2010s ===
BelaPAN’s website was hacked on October 24, 2011, the attackers left Lukashenko’s portrait on the main page.

BelaPAN and Naviny domains were blocked on December 20, 2014. On October 3, 2015, BelaPAN’s server experienced a significant DDoS attack after publishing materials on the ‘Pray for Belarus’ action. Other blockages occurred on March 27, 2015, and February 15, 2016. At that time several important political events took place: private entrepreneurs meeting at the Kastryčnickaja Square, in Brussels the EU Council meeting discussed the possibility of lifting the sanctions on Belarusian officials Though the site's blockage could be done only by order of the government, officially it was named hackers' attack. Simultaneously several other independent media portals were blocked.

=== BelTA case ===
Several journalists and the editor-in-chief of BelaPAN were arrested for alleged stealing of news from a paid subscription of a government-owned BelTA agency. BelaPAN’s editor-in-chief Leŭšyna was held in a temporary holding facility for three days. Human rights activists, BAJ and OSCE members unanimously called the BelTA case an intimidation to all the independent media, and the reaction of local authorities to be highly disproportionate.

=== 2020s ===
On January 14, 2021, the office of BelaPAN was searched, office equipment and part of the handwritten and printed documentation were seized, what paralyzed the work of the news agency.

On August 18, 2021, the editorial office and homes of six BelaPAN employees were searched by law enforcement. Five journalists were detained, including director and chief editor Iryna Leushyna, the agency’s former director Dzmitry Navazhilau, accountant Katsyaryna Boeva, correspondents Zakhar Shcharbakov and Iryna Turchyna, deputy chief editor and Naviny.by editor Aliaksandar Zaitsau. They were held at the ill-famed Okrestina Detention Facility. The police also confiscated BelaPAN’s servers and personal laptops, cellphones and flashdrives of the detained journalists. On the same day, the Investigative Committee of Belarus announced that Leushyna, Boeva, and Navazhilau are suspected of organizing or participating in gross violations of public order under Article 342, Part 1, of Belarus criminal code, and evading an unspecified amount in taxes. They could face up to 16 years in prison. By September 9, 2021, only one letter from Leushyna was delivered to her daughter.

In November 2021, the KGB declared BelaPAN an extremist formation. Creation of such a formation or participation in it is a criminal offence in Belarus, and indeed, Leushyna and Navazhilau were charged with creation of an extremist formation. BelaPAN websites, already blocked in Belarus, have stopped updating.

The former team of BelaPAN and Naviny.by created the news agency Pozirk and, in October 2023, announced launching the website Pozirk.online.

== Awards ==
BelaPAN has received numerous awards, including:

- Dźmitry Zavadski Prize "For Courage and Professionalism" (2004);
- the Zeit Foundation's Free Media Awards (2005);
- the Runet Prize as the best online Russian language source of news outside Russia (2006);
- Corporate Social Responsibility Award (2016);
- editor-in-chief Iryna Leǔšyna received Journalist of Year award (2018);
- BelaPAN’s reporter Taciana Karaviankova was awarded Civil Society Champion prize (2018);
- Leader of Consumer Market Award (2019).

== Sources ==
- "New Projects Submitted to the IPDC" (PDF). UNESCO HQ, Paris: IPDC Bureau. 2011-03-24. p. 85.
- Gradushko, A. A. (2019). "Основы творческой деятельности веб-журналиста" [Basics of Web Journalism] (PDF). Belarusian State University (in Russian). Minsk: 239. ISBN 978-985-566-822-1.
- Gradushko, A. A. (2013). Современная веб-журналистика Беларуси [Contemporary Web Journalism in Belarus] (PDF) (in Russian). Minsk: Belarus State University. p. 179. ISBN 978-985-518-935-1.
- Gradushko, A. A. (2015). Современные форматы визуализации в белорусских интернет-сми [Contemporary Formats of Visualization in Belarusian Web Media] (PDF) (Report) (in Russian). Minsk: Belarus State University. pp. 112–114.
- "Freedom of the Media in Belarus" (PDF). OSCE Public Seminar. Vienna: 25–33. 2001-05-31.
- Shibut, I. P. (2006). Из истории развития сетевых изданий Беларуси (PDF) (Report). Minsk: Belarus State University. pp. 1–8.
