= Andrey Bastunets =

Belarusian free speech activist

- Born: 1966 (age 59–60); Minsk, Byelorussian SSR, Soviet Union
- Occupation: Free speech activist
- Years active: 1990s–present

Andrey Leonidovich Bastunets (Russian: Андрей Леонидович Бастунец; born 1966) is a Belarusian lawyer, journalist, musician, and free speech activist. Bastunets was born in Minsk in 1966, he graduated from the law faculty of the BSU. Since 2015, he is the chairman of the Belarusian Association of Journalists.

== Biography ==
=== Education and career ===
Bastunets studied at public school No. 117 in Minsk. His first attempt to enter the BSU law faculty wasn't successful so he had to find temporary employment at the Minsk Automobile Plant. He used his vacation to prepare for exams and entered the university the next year. However, during the first semester he was enlisted into the army and spent two years serving within the border troops. After the army he continued his study and graduated with honours. Since the 1990s Bastunets worked as a journalist. Between 1997 and 2000 he was a chief editor of the newspaper ‘Femida Nova’. In 1998 he was awarded with an international diploma ‘For Establishing Peace in Belarus’. In 2001 Bastunets became a legal consultant at the Belarusian Association of Journalists. In 2008-2011 he hosted the TV-show ‘I Have a Right’.

Andrey Bastunets wrote and co-authored multiple researches and books on journalism, its ethics, security, media self-regulatory mechanisms, etc.

In 2015 Bastunets took the post of BAJ chairman after Zhanna Litvina, who resigned after 20 years of service. In autumn 2020 he entered the Belarusian opposition Coordination Council for the Transfer of Power. Amid a growing pressure on independent media Bastunets was detained by the police, his apartment and BAJ office were searched.

Bastunets was re-elected Chairman of the Belarusian Association of Journalists in April 2021.

On 3 May 2022, Bastunets, as head of BAJ, received the UNESCO Guillermo Cano World Press Freedom Prize at a ceremony in Uruguay.

On 7 March 2023, the KGB of Belarus declared BAJ an "extremist formation" and banned its activities in Belarus on the basis of the Law of the Republic of Belarus No. 203-Z "On Countering Extremism", although the association was officially liquidated by the authorities in 2021 and moved all its activities abroad. On February 6, 2023, Bastunets filed a complaint to United Nations Human Rights Council over BAJ's forced liquidation claiming that the Belarusian authorities violated the right to freedom of association under Article 22 of the ICCPR.

== Personal life ==
Since 2003 Bastunets is married to journalist and editor Sabina Brilo, he has a son.

Bastunets writes music and poetry. In the 1990s his poems were published in various periodicals, Belarusian newspaper ‘Znamya Unosti’ (trans. Flag of Youth) had his personal column. He was a member of ‘SvetoTen’ (trans. ‘Light and Shade’) poetry club. Bastunets released two albums of his songs. In 2016 he published a book of poems ‘Dokazatelstva Dvizheniya’ (trans.‘Proves of Movement’).
