= Belposhta =

State-owned national postal service of the Republic of Belarus

Belposhta Белпошта (in Belarusian) Belpochta Белпочта (in Russian)
- Industry: Courier
- Founded: 1995
- Headquarters: Independence Avenue 10, Minsk, Belarus
- Services: Post, parcel service, EMS, delivery, freight forwarding, third-party logistics
- Owner: Government of Belarus (100%)
- Number of employees: 17,000 (2025)
- Website: Belpochta

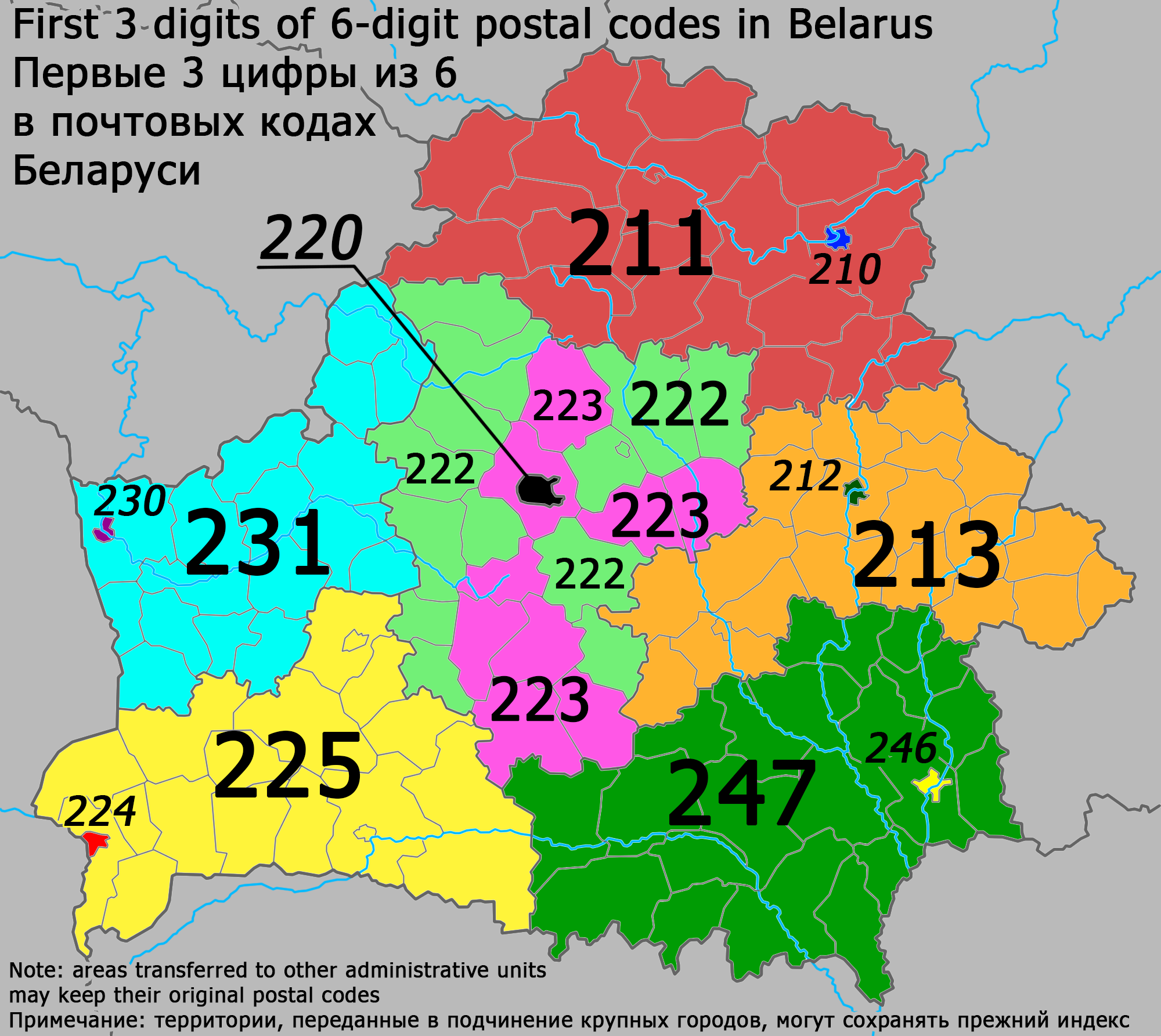
Belarusian postal code system showing first 3 digits on map

Belposhta (Belarusian: Белпошта) or Belpochta (Russian: Белпочта) is the national postal service of Belarus. It became a member of the Universal Postal Union in 1947.

== History ==
The development of postal services in Belarus began in ancient times. So, for 885 is the first mention in the Chronicle of the messenger service of the Belarusian land, "Sent to Oleg radzimichy asking..."

In Kievan Rus' there was a special "position" - the prince's messenger. The couriers delivered the order of the prince in various areas of the country. Sometimes the messenger went, and without certificates, special messages memorized.

In 1583, the first in Belarus post road (Warszawa - Białystok - Grodno - Vilnius) introduced a system of tariffs, which operates today in all countries of the world. Shipping determined by the type and origin of its weight.

In 1793, Belarus became part of the Russian Empire, and then mail it is further developed as part of the postal system of the Russian Empire. Postal districts were formed, including Minsk, Vitebsk and Mogilev.

The first telegraph station in Belarus were equipped in 1859 at the Minsk post office and in Bobruisk. Organized the first telegraph line.

Regular transport of mail by rail began in 1871 along the route Minsk – Moscow, Minsk – Rivne, Minsk – Brest, Minsk – Lyubava. Post cars had special racks for storage and sorting mail. The cars were hanging mailboxes to receive messages at train stops.

== Current status ==
In 2018 the company had:

- more than 24,000 employees;
- six regional branches;
- production "Minsk mail";
- motor transport;
- more than 3,100 postal objects;
- more than 60 centers of comprehensive maintenance of corporate customers "Business Mail";
- six points of reception and issuing mailing;
- more than 1,600 cars;
- more than 1,100 postal routes;
- daily mileage of more than 160,000 km.

Among the service of Belpochta delivers newspapers by subscription. In August 2020, Belpochta ceased to deliver the non-state social and political newspaper Narodnaia Volia to subscribers. Later, Belpochta refused to distribute Narodnaia Volia and sued this newspaper and Svabodnyie Novosti Pus. According to Belpochta, the delivery services of the part of their circulation were rendered.

In November 2020, Belpochta did not contribute 4 non-state newspapers to its subscription directory for 2021. In April 2021, Belpochta refused to take on the implementation of in his departments and include in the subscription catalog on the 2nd half of 2021, the private Baranovichi publication Intex-Press. In June 2021, Belpochta, the general director of Belpochta declared the inclusion in the subscription catalog on the 2nd half of 2021 of another non-state newspaper — New Hour, suspecting the publication in the publication of materials that violate the law on the media.

On January 3, 2021, Belpochta launched a paid email ("National Postal Electronic System").

== Services ==
The main types of services provided by Belpochta include:

- Reception, processing, storage, transportation, delivery (handing) of mailing.
- International departures.
- Postage of parties.
- Hybrid mail.
- International Accelerated Mail – EMS.
- Payment of pensions, benefits, compensation and the implementation of other payments.
- Provision of postal services at home.
- Subscription to periodic prints.
- Direct mail.
- Services of customs agent and temporary storage warehouses.

== See also ==
- Postage stamps and postal history of Belarus
