= Tut.By =

Belarusian news portal

TUT.BY
- Website type: Internet portal
- Available in: Russian
- Founded: March 15, 2000
- Dissolved: June 14, 2022
- Successor: Zerkalo.io
- Owner: TUT BY MEDIA LLC
- Creator: Yury Zisser
- Website: http://tut.by/
- Commercial: Yes
- Registration: Free
- Launched: October 5, 2000
- Current status: Inactive

Tut.By was an independent news, media and service internet portal, one of the five most popular websites in Belarus, operating predominantly in Russian and partially in Belarusian languages, and the most popular news web portal in the country. After its owning company was closed down by the Minsk Economic Court in June 2022, its successor Zerkalo.io (meaning Mirror) remains online as of September 2022.

TUT.BY was based in Minsk, Belarus. In 2019, the website was read by 62.58% of all Belarusian Internet users with monthly visits rating around 200 million.

Tut.By published around 200 articles on domestic and foreign agenda daily, including original stories and video, analytics, special projects, and online broadcasts. Apart from the news section, Tut.By had numerous specialized sections (Auto, Lady, Finance, Afisha, Realty, Sport) and services like weather and exchange rates. The editorial standard claimed to prioritize socially important topics on Belarus and world agenda in compliance with Journalism ethics.

Tut.by was registered as an online media service on January 21, 2019.

On October 1, 2020, following coverage by Tut.By of the 2020 Belarusian protests, Tut.By had its media credentials revoked for three months by the Ministry of Information, citing a court order that found that Tut.By published "prohibited information". Tut.By stated that it intended to continue operating. On July 8, the former Tut.By team launched a new service, Zerkalo.io, which was intended to continue the operations until the comeback of Tut.By became possible. On August 13, 2021, Tut.By and Zerkalo.io and all their content were declared extremist by the Central District court of Minsk. On February 24, 2022, it was blocked in Russia for its coverage of the Russo-Ukrainian war. On June 14, 2022, TUT BY Media company that issued TUT.by was declared extremist by Minsk Economic Court. The court ordered to dissolve the company, prohibited all operations in Belarus and banned using its logos and symbols.

In June 2023, the Ministry of Internal Affairs of Belarus designated Zerkalo as an extremist formation.

== History ==
=== Launch and early years ===
In March 2000, tech journalist Sergey Dmitriev posted on the forum of the newspaper Komp'yuternyye vesti (lit. "Computer News") that he had an idea to create a free Belarusian email service. The post attracted the attention of Yuri Zisser, then the head of the private enterprise "Nadezhnyye programmy". On March 15, 2000, they had their first personal meeting; this day is considered to be the start of Tut.By. Dmitriev invited two Komp'yuternyye vesti journalists, Andrey Kononovich and Kirill Voloshin, while Zisser invited Danil Rudenko, a first-year BSUIR student and programmer with experience in developing e-mail services and websites. Kononovich, Voloshin and Rudenko contributed to the launch of the project. The portal was named by Zisser's friend Nikolay Romanovsky, other variants were ‘holub.by’ and ‘busel.by’. The founders wanted Tut.By to become the Belarusian equivalent of Yahoo! and copied its business model. Development started in July and was finished in autumn 2000.

Tut.By was launched on October 5, 2000, and within months it became the most visited site on Bynet. At first, it consisted of a free email service, news, weather forecast, currency rates, fuel prices, and a guest book. Later in 2000, a forum was added, and soon the Hoster.by hosting provider was registered. In 2000 Tut.By had more than 20,000 unique visitors daily, and by April 2001, daily traffic reached 1.2 million visits. Yury Zisser was awarded the "Person of the Year on ByNet" title in 2002.

In January 2002, the E-commerce centre was launched to provide free and paid services in site development, design, promotion, hosting, and domain registration. In October 2002 the project became profitable, with around 75% of income received from Hosting.by services and only 25% from advertisements. By the end of 2004, more than 30 theme sections were separated, including music, culture, and education. At the same time, Kirill Voloshin was awarded the "Person of the Year on ByNet" prize. In 2004 Marina Zolotova took the post of editor-in-chief.

In the beginning, Tut.By functioned as a news aggregator, a digest with a strong shift to business and economics. It published news from such agencies as Interfax, BelTA, and Kp.by. In 2005, the marketplace Shop.tut.by was launched, then followed by a Finance section with data on currency rates, savings, credits, and personal finance management service. At the end of 2006, Tut.By launched an IT department, and a year later, a web-journals section was added. The company had 18 employees then. In the same year, 85% of annual revenue was brought by advertising, with the rest brought by hosting services. In December 2007 the portal launched its radio.

In February 2008, I.tut.by for personal communication was launched, uniting all the existing social services of Tut.By. By 2013, it had more than 246,000 registered users.

In 2009, Tut.By went international. In collaboration with Russian and Kazakhstan partners, it launched the Nur.kz news portal. From 2010 to 2012, similar partnerships were made with Azerbaijan (Day.az), Uzbekistan (Olam.az), and Nigeria (Naij.com). Naji.com soon grew to 250,000 unique users and its Facebook page gained 0.5 million subscribers.

=== 2010s ===
In the 2010s, the company continued its rapid development. By 2011 the staff grew to 50 extrabudgetary and 90 office workers. The mobile site version was launched and soon had more than 19,000 unique visitors per day. In 2012, Alexander Chekan becomes the CEO of Tut.by. And already in Autumn 2012, the marketplace was launched. In 2013, the first regional office was opened in Gomel. As of 2013, Tut.by homepage got 503,000 unique visitors daily, in 2014 Tut.by had 47.89% of all audience on ByNet.

By 2015, forums at Tut.by accumulated more than 240,000 threads and 16.5 mln posts. In 2015, the catalog of Belarusian enterprises was separated into an independent editors office and received a new name Tam.by (wordplay ‘Tut’ lit. meaning ‘Here’ and ‘Tam’ meaning ‘There’).

In 2016, Tut.by had more than 780.000 unique visitors daily and more than 7.7 mln views, its staff almost reached 300 employees. That year on weekdays around 200 articles were published on the main page. I.Tut.by social network accumulated 150.000 registered users by 2016.

In 2017, TUT.BY was recognized as a well-known trademark in Belarus. It pioneered quality infographics on the ByNet, making this visualization tool an important part of the News section. The company's public account on Viber became the most popular among other media and reached 285.000 subscribers. In 2017, Rabota.tut.by had more than 155.000 active resumes and 19392 vacancies published. In March 2018, Belarusian audience of TUT.BY for the first overtook big online platforms like Yandex, Mail.Ru, and YouTube.

As of 2019, more than 8.5 mln Tut.by pages were stored in Google index. More than 70% of users visited the site's mobile version According to Tut.by, in May 2019 a new record was set as news of all subdomains got 178 million views (web + apps, according to Yandex.Metrica).

=== 2020s ===
The founder of Tut.by, Yury Zisser, died on May 17, 2020.

On May 29, 2020, the site was DDoSed and down for several hours. The attack coincided in time with the arrest of blogger Sergei Tikhanovsky, who had recently announced his run for presidency.

On August 9, 2020, the president of Belarus promised to punish tut.by for its election-related reporting, and the website went offline.

On 13 August 2021, tut.by and zerkalo.io and all their content were declared extremist by the Central district court of Minsk.

In June 2023, the Ministry of Internal Affairs of Belarus designated Zerkalo as an extremist formation.

== Social responsibility and non-commercial projects ==
In 2003, Tut.by established the Belarusian Content Projects Award for promising noncommercial websites. The competition significantly contributed to the development of independent media in ByNet.

Since 2012, Hoster.by has initiated domain name auctions. All the income is donated to orphanages across Belarus.

In August 2014, TUT.BY launched a non-commercial project BelarusFeed, targeted on the foreign audience who is interested in Belarus and wants to visit the country.

In 2014, the company joined the UN Sustainable Development programme. Since then the company annually published Sustainability reports on its initiatives in human rights and environment protection. In the same year TUT.BY and life:) mobile operator launched the Freebasics project, a joint initiative to ensure the availability of mobile Internet. TUT.BY supplied news for the project alongside Wikipedia, UN Women and others. Among other projects, TUT.BY and BelarusFeed created a collection of postcards “Welcome To Belarus”. The postcards were handed out to foreigners travelling to Belarus to mark the introduction of the 5 days visa-free entry.

In 2017, TUT.BY was among 30 Belarusian companies that signed the “Cooperation agreement of the socially responsible companies in Belarus in the implementation of corporate social responsibility projects”. The agreement was initiated by the local social fund Fond Dobra, part of the UN Global Compact Network Belarus. In November 2018, TUT.BY became the info partner in the II European Games 2019.

== State censorship and independent media ==
In the late 2000s, the editors office decided to change course from news aggregator to independent journalism with its own texts, reports, and investigations. Though big agencies usually could publish the news instantly, Tut.by won his audience by giving the news with “a human touch”, without state censorship and in compliance with journalist ethics. Social issues and events with a public outcry were developed by Tut.by staff journalists and users could openly share their opinions via comments and on the site's forum.

On December 19, 2014, Tut.by was blocked in Belarus for several hours. Officially called DDoS attack, the blockage was actually a part of a massive strike against the country's independent media. In December 2014 the amendments to state Mass Media Act were issued, putting the responsibility for any comments on a website upon its owners. Consequently, Tut.by had to relocate its forums to a new domain name talks.by to avoid blockage for user comments.

On December 25, 2016, Tut.by journalist Pavel Dobrovolsky was beaten by police officers directly in the Frunzienski district court. Dobrovolsky was on professional duty, covering the hearing of the case of two graffiti artists. OSCE called this situation unacceptable and called authorities to ensure the journalist's safety. According to the portal analysis, at least three attacks on journalists happen in Belarus annually.

In 2017, State Ministry of Information issued a warning to editors office for an article on Belarusian citizens who fought in the war in Donbas. Though the government itself acknowledged that at least 140 Belarusians took an active part in the fights, the article was called by the Ministry to be “threatening to the State's interests”. According to the Belarusian law, two official warnings in a year could lead to the site's blockage. In a 2017 interview, the founder of TUT.BY Yuri Zisser mentioned that there were serious issues with freedom of speech in Belarus and only gradual, civilized dialog with the government and much effort could turn the situation to the best. Zisser received the “Advocacy Leader 2016” award from the Assembly of business circles for his lasting effort to promote this dialogue between business and government.

In 2018, the so-called BelTA case took place. In June 2018 the editor-in-chief Marina Zolotova and 14 other employees of Tut.by were arrested for alleged unauthorized access to information from a state news agency BelTA. All except Zolotova were released soon, who was charged under the Criminal Code. OSCE Representative Harlem Désir called the case and massive fine to be ‘deeply alarming’, BAJ representative called it an intimidation signal for all independent journalists in Belarus. The court sentenced Zolotova to a fine of 7,650 rubels. Later Zolotova recalled how former Minister of information Lilia Ananich invited directors of the leading independent media and advised them on the desired way to describe the economic situation in the country, asking not to “rock the boat”.

== 2021 crackdown ==
On May 18, 2021, the authorities blocked Tut.by accusing it of publishing 'prohibited information', including the content about "unregistered" Belarus Solidarity Foundation (BYSOL). BYSOL is an organization that supports victims of repressions in Belarus. The officials raided Tut.by office and homes of the staff. On the same day a criminal case has been initiated, accusing the website of tax fraud.

On the same day 15 journalists, including Marina Zolotova, Anastasiya Prudnikava, Dzianis Burkouski, Maksim Pushkin, Ala Burkouskaya, Olga Loiko (Chief Editor of the Politics and Economics section) were arrested and sent to the infamous Okrestina detention centre. Yury Zisser's widow cultural scientist Yulia Chernyavskaya was also detained and soon found by journalists in the cardiovascular care unit of Minsk hospital. The tax fraud charges pressed on Tut.by and its employees are acknowledged as fabricated and pursue only the goal to further block independent media in the country.

On August 13, 2021, Tut.by, as well as its project, Zerkalo.io, were declared 'extremist' by the court ruling. Marina Zolotova faces up to seven years in prison. In early October 2021 a new criminal case was opened against Tut.by and its staff for alleged incitement to hatred.

Zisser's widow was released only on January 13, 2022. Former Deputy Chief Accountant Maria Novik, Vice Director Irina Rybalka and Chief Accountant Angela Asad were released under a gag order without dropping charges. On March 17, 2022, three more staff members were released after serving ten months in prison under the same conditions: Chief Editor of Political and Economical News Block Olga Loiko, Deputy Technical Director Alexander Daineko and manager of Publisher Box Andrew Avdeev. While imprisoned, Loiko lost her father and was unable to help her sister during an 8.5 months course of medical treatment.

As of March 17, 2022, 5 women were still imprisoned: Executive Director Ludmila Chekina, Former Chief Editor Marina Zolotova, Chief Engineer Alla Lopatko, Project Manager of TAM.by Daria Danilova, and journalist Elena Tolkacheva.

On June 14, 2022, TUT BY Media company that issued TUT.by was declared extremist by Minsk Economic Court. The court ordered to dissolve the company, prohibited all operations in Belarus and banned using its logos and symbols.

By June 18, 2022, Tolkacheva and all other employees of Tut.by except Zolotova and Chekina were released from prison, however, they remained suspects, most of them have been put on the KGB terrorist list. Although it was initially stated that they would only face economic charges, on January 9, 2023, Zolotova and Chekina were officially accused of "inciting hatred" and "calls for sanctions, other actions aimed at harming the national security of the Republic of Belarus" under chapters 243.2 and 361.3 of State Criminal Code. In March 2023, both Zolotova and Chekina were sentenced to 12 years in a general regime penal colony.

== Awards ==
- Winner in the nomination “Most popular and visited Internet portal in the Republic of Belarus” (International festival and contest Choice Of The Year 2002).
- Best PR project with advanced web marketing by PRemiya 2003.
- Finalist at the Kyiv International Advertising Festival in 2004.
- “Leader brand” according to the nationwide poll in the product group “Information websites” in 2004, 2005, 2013, 2014 and 2015.
- Best search engine at TIBO 2005.
- Best News Portal Prize at Golden Site Awards 2005.
- Brand of the Year Award winner in News Web Portal in 2007, 2008, 2009, 2010, 2013
- Best Search Engine at Belarus Choice of the Year Award 2009.
- Brand of the Year Award winner in Socially Responsible Brand and Brand Leader in 2010.
- Best IT company in Belarus in nominations Team Spirit and Collective Work and Best Company (under 200 employees)
- 2015 – TUT.BY named a socially responsible mass media source for the regular coverage of the CSR projects of Belarusian business (the award for corporate social responsibility by the International social economic fund Idea).
- 2016 – Winner among internet portals in the consumer nomination of the professional republican contest Brand Of The Year.
- 2016 – CEO Alexander Chekan got the ‘Mentor of the Year’ Award.
- TUT.BY became an 11-times winner in the category “Information websites” at Brand Of The Year 2017.
- Afisha.TUT.BY and Realty.TUT.BY won the nomination “Media with the best audience involvement”.
- In 2018 42.TUT.BY was among the winners of the international internet-media award ‘Mediator’. Lady.TUT.BY won the nomination “Most read media” in 2018.
- TUT.BY сhief editor Marina Zolotova was named Person Of The Year 2018 by Nasha Niva newspaper and became the first laureate of the Belarusian Journalism Honor award. The award was established in memory of Ales Lipai, the founder of the BelaPAN information agency. The award is presented to journalists who combine professional achievements with civil action and contribute to the development of the media in Belarus and the emergence of the country as a democratic state.
- In February 2019, YouTube sent the “Silver Button” (an award handed to the authors of popular channels) to TUT.BY as the portal's video channel reached 100,000 subscribers.
- In May 2019 TUT.BY topped the Media IQ ranking as the Belarusian media with best compliance to journalism ethics.
- In August 2021, TUT.BY got the Free Media Award.

== Sources ==
- Doroshevich, Mikhail; Sokolova, Marina (2014). "Internet: Infrastructure, Users, Regulations". Belarusian Yearbook (in Russian) (1): 150–158.
- Doroshevich, Mikhail; Sokolova, Marina (2016). "Www: the limits of developing extensive infrastructure". Belarusian Yearbook (1 (eng)): 146–155.
- Gradushko, A. A. (2019). "Основы творческой деятельности веб-журналиста" [Basics of Web Journalism] (PDF). Belarusian State University (in Russian). Minsk: 239. ISBN 978-985-566-822-1.
- Gradushko, A. A. (2013). Современная веб-журналистика Беларуси [Contemporary Web Journalism in Belarus] (PDF) (in Russian). Minsk: Belarus State University. p. 179. ISBN 978-985-518-935-1.
- Gradushko, A. A. (2016). "Содержательная и жанровая специфика новостных интернет-порталов Республики Беларусь" [Semantic and Genre Specific of Belarus News Web Portals]. International Scientific-practical Conference of Kazan Federal University (in Russian). Belarusian State University: 262–269.
- Klunya, V. L.; Gerasimuk, T. V. (2019). "Состояние и проблемы развития цифровой экономики в Республике Беларусь". Economic and Financial Mechanisms of Digital Economy Innovative Development. 1. BSU Institute of Business: 8–11.
- Trushko, Ye. G.; Shpakovsky, Yu. F. (2018). "Data Visualization Analysis (as exemplified by infographics of portal Tut.by)". Belarusian State Technological University Journal. 4 (2): 38–43.
- Zaitsev, M. L. (2017). "Распространение контента современными медиа: тенденции и специфика" [Distribution of the content of new media: trends and specificity] (PDF). Journal of the Belarusian State University. Journalism and Pedagogics (in Russian) (2): 19–23. ISSN 2521-6783.
