= European Federation of Journalists =

The European Federation of Journalists is the European regional organisation of the International Federation of Journalists. It describes itself as the largest organisation of journalists in Europe, and says it represents about 320,000 journalists in 74 journalists’ organisations across 46 countries. It is headquartered in Brussels.

== History ==
The EFJ was created in 1994 within the framework of the IFJ Constitution to represent the interests of journalists.

== Activities ==
The EFJ fights for social and professional rights of journalists through strong trade unions and associations. It promotes and defends the rights to freedom of expression and information as guaranteed by Article 10 of the European Convention on Human Rights, and supports trade union development and media environments that foster quality, pluralism and journalistic independence.

It is registered with the EU Transparency Register (No. 27471236588-39). The EFJ is member of the Executive Committee of the European Trade Union Confederation (ETUC). It is recognized by the European Union, the Council of Europe and the European Trade Union Confederation as a representative voice of journalists in Europe.
