= Criminal Code of Belarus =

The Criminal Code of the Republic of Belarus (Belarusian: Крымінальны кодэкс Рэспублікі Беларусь, romanized: Kryminaĺny kodeks Respubliki Bielaruś — КК РБ [KK RB]; Russian: Уголовный кодекс Республики Беларусь — УК РБ [UK RB]) contains the fundamental laws to announce what is considered illegal to perform inside Belarus. Passed in 1999, several of these laws were carried over from laws passed in 1960 as the Byelorussian SSR. In the 1999 edition, the Criminal code contains passages of crimes that can be issued capital punishment upon sentencing.

As of 2022, court cases in Belarus are often scheduled ten minutes apart from one another and can conclude in as little as three minutes, and have been criticized for being "not a court". Consistently from 2016 through 2020, trials of criminal cases resulting in a guilty verdict occurred at a frequency of 99.7% and 99.8%.

== See also ==
- Administrative Code of Belarus
- Show trial
- Okrestina
- Prison Number 8
