= Belarusian Association of Journalists =

Professional association of journalists in Belarus

BAJ
- Belarusian Association of Journalists
- Беларуская асацыяцыя журналістаў Белорусская ассоциация журналистов
- Established: 1995
- Type: Professional association
- Location: Minsk, Belarus
- Chairperson: Andrey Bastunets
- Publication: Abajour
- Affiliations: IFJ, EFJ, Reporters without Borders
- Website: Official website

The Belarusian Association of Journalists (BAJ) (Belarusian: Беларуская асацыяцыя журналістаў, romanized: Biełaruskaja Asacyjacyja Žurnalistaǔ; Russian: Белорусская ассоциация журналистов, romanized: Belorusskaya assotsiatsiya zhurnalistov) is a Belarusian professional association of journalists from independent media, created in 1995 to protect freedom of speech, freedom of information, promote the professional standards of journalism, conduct monitoring of Belarusian press, and offer legal support to all media workers.

In 1997, BAJ became an associate member of the International Federation of Journalists. Since 2013, the Association has also been a full member of the European Federation of Journalists.

The Association experienced significant pressure from the authorities since the 2000s. The journalists were detained, beaten, forbidden to leave the country, faced criminal and administrative charges, etc. In the Summer the Ministry of Justice of the Republic of Belarus 2021 issued a warning to BAJ and demanded access to thousands of documents, including all emails for 3.5 years. Part of the required documents was confiscated by the Investigative Committee of Belarus a few months earlier, some were unavailable and kept inside the office, sealed after police searches. A day later after the second warning the Ministry initiated the liquidation process. The Supreme Court of Belarus terminated BAJ license on August 27, 2021. On February 28, 2023, the Association was declared an 'extremist formation' by the Belarusian KGB.

== Activities ==
The association became the most respected media organization in the country, it united more than 1300 members, mainly from independent non-governmental media. Data from BAJ monitoring was widely used in Belarusian media. Activities of the organization included legal assistance to journalists, support of regional press, cooperation with international organizations. BAJ also was engaged in educational programmes, it organized various conferences, seminars, table talks, and training for journalists. It launched such media campaigns as ‘Preserving Historical Heritage’, ‘For Ecological Well Being’, ‘High Standard of Journalism’. The Association considered professional education of journalists to be the most important part of its work. It cooperated with the European Journalism Centre (EJC), Fojo Media Institute, Norvegian, Danish, and Lithuanian Journalists Unions, the Friedrich Naumann Foundation for Freedom. BAJ network included an office in Minsk and five regional offices in Luninets, Vitebsk, Gomel, Molodechno, and Mogilev. BAJ also had an Ethics Commission to review appeals regarding alleged breaches of professional Code of journalism ethics.

BAJ offered legal and psychological assistance to repressed journalists; it helped release detained reporters while working and ensured provision of medical care to ones put in detention centres. and arrange for correspondence with prisoners

== History ==
=== Founding ===
BAJ was founded in 1995, Zhanna Litvina was elected as its chairman. Since 2000 the association published a monthly magazine, Abajour, that served as a platform for discussion on such topics as journalism ethics, handling information, professional responsibilities, etc. In 2000 BAJ held the first ‘Independent Press Festival’, two years later it organized ‘Closed Newspapers Festival’. In 2003, BAJ accepted the ‘Declaration of Journalism Professional Ethics’. Along with the Charter, the Declaration became the main document for BAJ members to rely on in their work. In 2006 the Association was re-registered. Since 2007 BAJ has run the ‘Вольнае слова’ (trans. ‘Free Words’) competition for journalists.

In 2002-2003, BAJ led a nation-wide campaign against the new Law ‘On Mass Media’ that was designed to restrain independent press and stifle freedom of speech. The Association advocated for decriminalization of three Articles of the Belarus Criminal Code, which provided for up to two years imprisonment for ‘defamation, libel and insult to high-ranking officials or the president’. The Association gathered more than 7000 signatures and appealed to the Constitutional Court in order to verify the Law’s compliance to the State Constitution.

In 2013 BAJ became a full member of the European Federation of Journalists. By 2015 the Association had 1150 members. On April 24, 2015, Zhanna Litvina stepped down from the chairman post. Andrey Bastunets was elected as the new head of the organization.

=== State Pressure ===
The organization suffered pressure from the authorities throughout all its active years. Members of BAJ were numerous times detained, beaten, forbidden to leave the country, faced criminal and administrative charges, called for questioning by the KGB and General Prosecutor, their cameras and documents confiscated. Only in 2017-2019 BAJ registered 1079 cases of physical, legal, or administrative attacks on journalists.

On January 13, 2010, the Justice Ministry issued a warning and prohibited BAJ to use the word “press” on the credentials of its journalists. In early 2011 seven members of the association were arrested and faced legal charges that were explained by human rights defenders as vengeance of the authorities for coverage of the protests after 2010 Belarusian presidential election. One of them (Paval Sieviaryniec) was sentenced to seven years in prison, others got up to four years.

In 2014 and 2018 the Association stood against new restrictive amendments to the Law ‘On Mass Media’. The reforms were giving space for the authorities to further crack down the independent voices. It introduced obligatory registration of new media outlets, easier procedures allowing to ban websites and suspend whole editorials.

=== 2020–2021 protests and beyond ===
During the 2020–2021 Belarusian protests, BAJ together with Reporters without Borders collected data that showed Belarus was Europe's most dangerous country for journalists in 2020. The association also provided persecuted journalists with legal support, while repeatedly being a target of state repression itself. On 18 January 2021 BAJ declared Andrej Aliaksandraŭ and Iryna Zlobina political prisoners. In March 2021, BAJ condemned the sentencing of journalist Katsiaryna Barysevich of TUT.BY to half a year in prison for her reporting.

On February 16, 2021, BAJ suffered a wave of police raids on its office and houses of journalists and their relatives. The Investigative Committee explained the searches with alleged relation of BAJ to a criminal case under Article 342 (Organisation of group actions causing serious harm to social stability). Police detained the association's chairman Andrey Bastunets, several other members and freelance journalists, while searching their homes and the BAJ office. They confiscated laptops, cellphones, documents, hard and flash drives, handbooks, letters, even flags and books. CPJ and IFJ condemned the arrests. Three days later, the US imposed sanctions on 43 Belarusian officials for undermining the country's democracy, citing the case of the raid on BAJ in particular.

On June 9, 2021, the Belarus Justice Ministry initiated an investigation of the Association. On June 21, the Ministry requested thousands of documents, including financial reports, membership list, applications, protocols of sessions, and all emails for 3.5 years. BAJ filed a complaint underlining the unreasonable deadline in the circumstances of the office being sealed and documents confiscated. The organization’s license was withdrawn by the Supreme Court of Belarus on August 27. Reporters Without Borders condemned the liquidation, calling it 'a culmination of a crackdown on independent media' in the country. CPJ Program Director Carlos Martínez de la Serna shared this opinion.

Andrei Bastunets promised that the Association will keep working ‘in any possible legal ways’ despite the license withdrawal. He underlined that BAJ was a community and its members would stay dedicated to their values. The EFJ General Secretary Ricardo Gutiérrez promised support to the Association. As of March 2022, the organization's website is accessible outside Belarus and actively updated.

On February 28, 2023, the KGB has designated the Association as an 'extremist formation'; as a result, participation in it can be punished with a prison sentence.

On February 6, 2023, Bastunets filed a complaint to United Nations Human Rights Council over BAJ's forced liquidation claiming that the Belarusian authorities violated the right to freedom of association under Article 22 of the ICCPR.

== Prominent members ==
- Zhanna Litvina – the chairman since 1995 until April 25, 2015.
- Andrey Bastunets – the chairman since April 25, 2015.

== Awards ==
- 2003 — World Association of Newspapers and News Publishers' Golden Pen of Freedom Award.
- 2004 — the European Parliament's Sakharov Prize.
- 2011 — the Atlantic Council presented its Freedom Award to BAJ, the Belarus Free Theater and the Human Rights Center Viasna.
- 2020 — BAJ becomes the first recipient of the Canada-United Kingdom Media Freedom Award.
- 2021 — Free Media Award.
- 2022 — UNESCO/Guillermo Cano World Press Freedom Prize.
