= List of newspapers in Belarus =

In Belarus, there are both privately held and state-owned newspapers.

Below is a list of newspapers published in Belarus. These newspapers are published in Minsk, unless otherwise noted.

== Belarusian language ==
- Zviazda (Звязда, 40,000 copies) , the largest state-controlled Belarusian language newspaper.
- Novy Chas (Новы Час, 7,000 copies)
- Nasha Slova (Наша Слова, 7,000 copies), newspaper about culture and history, published by the Francishak Skaryna Belarusian Language Society
- Naša Niva (Наша Ніва; 6,000 copies) , the oldest Belarusian weekly newspaper founded in 1906 and revived in 1991, pro-opposition
- Holas Radzimy (Голас радзімы, 2,000 copies) , government-controlled newspaper for the Belarusian diaspora
- Narodnya Naviny Vitsebska (Народныя навіны Віцебска) - online newspaper from Vitsebsk
- Pahonia (Пагоня) - pro-opposition newspaper formerly published in Hrodna. In 2001 closed down by the government, since then on-line

== Russian language ==
- Brestskaya Gazeta (Брестская газета)
- Sovetskaya Belorussia (Советская Белоруссия; about 400,000 copies) , the largest national newspaper, official newspaper of the Administration of the President of Belarus
- Vo Slavu Rodiny (Во славу Родины; 32,300 copies) , official newspaper of the Belarusian Ministry of Defense
- Narodnaya Gazeta (Народная Газета, 25,042 copies) , official newspaper of the Parliament of Belarus
- BelGazeta (БелГазета, 21,200 copies) , independent national newspaper on business and politics
- Belorusy i rynok (Белорусы и Рынок, 12,000 copies) , weekly independent business newspaper
- 7 Dney (7 дней; Seven Days)
- Belorusskaya Delovaya Gazeta (БДГ; BDG) , formerly the largest independent newspaper on politics and business in 1990s (with about 70,000 copies), closed down by officials in 2006
- Belaruski Chas (Беларускі час)
- Belorusskaya Lesnaya Gazeta (Белорусская лесная газета; 23,000 copies) , a specialized professional newspaper on forestry
- Bobruyskiy Kurier (Бобруйский курьер) - published in Bobruysk
- Brestskiy Kurier (Брестский курьер) - published in Brest
- Gomelskaya Pravda (Гомельская правда) - published in Gomel
- Infa-Kurjer (Інфа-Кур'ер) - published in Slutsk
- Dnyaprovets (Дняпровец) - published in Rechitsa
- Meditsinskiy Vestnik (Медицинский вестник)
- Minsk na Ladonyah (Минск на Ладонях) – Freely-distributed advertising publication, closed some time after 2018
- Minskiy Kurier (Минский Курьер)
- Muzykalnaya Gazeta (Музыкальная газета; Music Newspaper)
- Nedvizhimost Belorussii (Недвижимость Белоруссии; Real Estate of Belarus)
- Respublikanskaya Stroitel'naya Gazeta (Республиканская строительная газета; Republic Construction Newspaper)
- Vecherniy Grodno (Вечерний Гродно) - published in Grodno
- Vecherniy Minsk (Вечерний Минск; Evening Minsk)
- Vitebskiy Kurier (Витебский Курьер) - published in Vitebsk
- Zheleznodorozhnik Belorussii (Железнодорожник Белоруссии; Railroad Worker of Belarus)

== Bilingual newspapers ==
- Narodnaja Volia (Народная воля, 15,000 copies), the largest national pro-opposition newspaper on politics
- Hazeta Slonimskaya (Газета Слонімская; Газета Слонимская; 7,000 to 8,000 copies) , an independent local newspaper published in Slonim
- Intex-Press (Интекс-пресс, 17,300 copies) , an independent local newspaper published in Baranavichy
- Zhodzinskiya Naviny (Жодзінскія Навіны; Zhodino News) - published in Zhodzina
- Vecherniy Brest (Вечерний Брест; Evening Brest) - published in Brest

== See also ==
- Media of Belarus
- List of newspapers
