= Mass media in Belarus =

The mass media in Belarus consists of TV, radio, newspapers, magazines, cinema, and Internet-based websites/portals. The media is monopolized by the government, which owns all TV channels, most of the radio and print media. Broadcasting is mostly in Russian, and Russian media are widely present. After 2020, all independent media were pushed out of the country. The Law on Mass Media has been repeatedly amended and tightened, making it virtually impossible for independent journalists and publications to operate. European, Ukrainian and news websites were blocked in Belarus. The Constitution of Belarus guarantees freedom of speech, but this is contradicted in practice by repressive and restrictive laws. Arbitrary detention, arrests, and harassment of journalists are frequent in Belarus. Anti-extremism legislation targets independent journalism, including material considered unfavourable to the president. As of 2024, Belarus ranks 167th in the World Press Freedom Index. BBC describes the Belarusian media environment as one of the most repressive in Europe.

== Legislative framework and regulatory authorities ==
Unlike other post-Soviet states after the dissolution of the Soviet Union in the early 1990s, Belarus preserved state control and ownership over most national media. De jure, the constitution of Belarus guarantees the rights of citizens to freedom of speech, prohibits censorship and monopolization of mass media. De facto, any criticism of president Lukashenko and his government is considered a criminal offense, the country is in a state of ‘legal default’, bureaucracy uses politicized court rulings to oppress independent media and any voices except ones that are completely loyal to the regime. No special laws require transparency in media ownership, and there are no legal guarantees of public access to government records.

Back in 2008 the government approved a Law on Mass Media that secured state control over media and made the Ministry of Information of Belarus (MIB) its main regulator.

Since 2009, all media outlets (including websites) must register to avoid being blocked. On 5 January 2015, the Law of the Republic of Belarus made all information published on the Internet be subject to the Criminal Code. Further amendments to the Mass Media Law adopted in June 2018 introduced tighter accreditation rules, allowed an extrajudicial shutting down online and social media, made website owners legally responsible for the content of their comments sections and obliged them to provide the technical possibility to identify the authors of these comments. Though unregistered web media were obliged to fulfill the obligations for the registered media, they were deprived of corresponding rights such as the right to journalist accreditation and a right to keep their sources in secret. For many years, strict accreditation rules and denials have been one of the authorities' tools to keep independent media out of public and official events, impose fines and ensure that only publications loyal to the government cover events.

2021 became the record year regarding law amendments aimed to control and repress the media market and its employees. Among the rest, MIB was allowed to shut down media outlets without court decision, news media were banned from live reporting on unauthorized mass gatherings, and results of opinion polls that weren't approved by the government were prohibited to publish. Any person or news organization was barred from opening a new media outlet within five years of authorities’ closing any of its other affiliated outlets.

A new set of restrictive amendments to the Law on Mass Media was adopted in 2023. It allowed authorities to ban foreign media outlets from unfriendly countries, specified the functioning of news aggregators and the legal status of their owners, expanded the list of grounds for cancelling a certificate of State registration of a mass media outlet and restricting access to an Internet resource.

== Censorship and media freedom ==
Reporters Without Borders ranked Belarus 154th out of 178 countries in its 2010 Press Freedom Index. In 2011, Belarus scored 92 on a scale from 10 (most free) to 99 (least free) in Freedom of the Press report. The score placed Belarus ninth from the bottom of the 196 countries included in the report. The situation continued to deteriorate, in 2022 the country had only 8 points out of 100. On the scale of Internet freedom, Freedom House's 2022 report described Belarus as ‘not free’ country with only 25 points out of 100. The authorities dominate the information sphere, the ongoing crackdown on independent media goes on since the 2020 presidential election. As of 2023, Belarus ranks 157th in the World Press Freedom Index, almost no independent media outlets still work inside the country.

In 2021, the Belarusian Association of Journalists reported more than 60 cases of criminal prosecution of journalists and bloggers. BelaPAN, Nasha Niva and TUT.by, as well as 410 Telegram and 20 YouTube channels were declared ‘extremist’ in 2021. As of 2023, 33 journalists were in jail, including chief editor of Tut.by Marina Zolotova, chief editor of Nasha Niva Jahor Marcinovič, Belsat reporters Katerina Andreeva and Darya Chultsova, Ksenia Lutskina (Press Club Belarus), Denis Ivashin (Novy Chas), Andrzej Poczobut, Alexander Ivulin (Tribuna.com), Valeriya Kostyugova (Belarusian Yearbook), Irina Levshina (BelaPAN), Gennady Mozheyko (Komsomolskaya Pravda v Belarusi), Andrei Kuznechik (Radio Liberty), Serhiy Satsuk (Yezhednevnik), Oleg Gruzdilovich (Narodnaia Volia), Ihar Losik (Radio Free Europe, Belarus Golovnogo Mozga Telegram channel), Eduard Palchys (PALCHYS Telegram news channel), and many more.

In 2023, BBC called the Belarusian media environment one of the most repressive in Europe.

== Media landscape ==
Belarus hosts state and privately owned media, however, the latter sector keeps decreasing due to the repressive media environment. In 2009 there were 1,314 media outlets in the country, 414 of them were state-owned and 900 privately owned. As of 1 September 2023, there were 921 printed publications including 371 newspapers and 561 magazines (400 state-run), 7 news agencies (2 state-run), 52 online media outlets (45 state-run), 99 radiostations (63 state-run), and 93 TV channels (41 state-run).

Most media outlets are Russian-language, since, according to rough estimates, more than 70% of Belarusians use the Russian language. Under Lukashenko, the state policy was to promote the Russian language, gradually the Belarusian language was pushed out of use. Thus it turned into the language of the opposition and independent publications.

The largest national mass media outlets are Belteleradio, the All-National TV, STV (Stolichnoye Televideniye), publishing houses Belarus Segodnya and Zvyazda, and the BelTA agency. State media are mostly commercially unprofitable and survive on subsidies and grants from the government, despite the fact that they operate under a favorable tax regime.

The country has a monopoly of terrestrial broadcasting infrastructure, and does not allow cable companies to carry channels without prior approval. State-owned postal and kiosk distribution systems and state-owned print facilities and advertising contracts are mostly off-limits for independent media. State-run media in Belarus praise President Alexander Lukashenko and vilify the opposition. Self-censorship is pervasive in private outlets. The Belarusian government maintains a monopoly of domestic broadcast media; in 2014 foreign ownership was restricted to a maximum of 20%. Back in 2010, OSCE Representative on Freedom of the Media Dunja Mijatović "said [that] pluralism was non-existing in the broadcasting sector, restricted in the print media and vulnerable on the Internet". Five years later, UN Special Rapporteur on the situation of human rights in Belarus Miklós Haraszti said: "Media pluralism is absent. Belarus is the only country in Europe with no privately owned nationwide broadcasting outlets".

In October 2020, the accreditations of all foreign journalists in Belarus were canceled by the authorities. Among those who reapplied successfully, the overwhelming majority are Russian journalists employed by state-run media.

== Outlets ==
=== Agencies ===
By 2015, Belarus hosted nine news agencies, two state-owned and seven private. The most important were BelTA (Belarus' largest news agency, and the official state news agency for nearly 90 years), BelaPAN (a private news agency founded in 1991), and Interfax-West (part of Interfax, that operated in Belarus since 1994 and catered primarily to national and local media).

As of 2023, only 7 agencies remained. Interfax-West ceased operations in Belarus on 1 January 2022, due to amendments made to the Law on Mass Media of the Republic of Belarus in May 2021 (Note: In particular, the amendments introduced the ban on posting the results of public opinion polls related to the socio-political situation, if conducted without obtaining the necessary accreditation. It was also prohibited to place hyperlinks to messages and materials containing information labeled as prohibited. In addition, the authorities to restrict access to Internet resources or stop the publication of media outlets were defined, and the possibility of withdrawing accreditation of journalists for certain violations was introduced.). BelaPAN was declared extremist by the KGB, its editor-in-chief Irina Levshina and deputy director Andrey Aleksandrov were sentenced to 4 and 14 years in prison, respectively.

=== Print media ===
As of September 2023, 921 printed publications were registered in Belarus. The majority of them are printed entirely in Russian, Russian newspapers Komsomolskaya Pravda (circulation of 203,000) and Argumenty i Fakty (120,000) are one of the most popular in Belarus.

The state-run Belarus Segodnya Publishing House is a media holding that publishes the five largest circulation newspapers: Belarus Segodnya (circulation of 400,000), Respublika (published since 1991), Selskaya Gazeta (1921), Znamya Yunosti (1938), and Narodnaya Gazeta (1990).

The state-run Zvyazda Publishing House was founded in 2012. The list of its publications includes the Zvyazda daily (circulation of 20,000), LiM newspaper, Alesya, Polymya, Nyoman, Maladosts, Rodnaya Pryroda, and Vozhyk magazines.

Among other state-controlled newspapers there are Holas Radzimy, Vo Slavu Rodiny, Zhodzinskiya Naviny, Vecherniy Brest, Vechernii Minsk, BelTA's 7 dnej (circulation of 40,000), etc.

Many popular independent publications were closed by the authorities, including several that were truly independent: Belorusskaya Delovaya Gazeta, Belorusy i rynok, Hazeta Slonimskaya, Narodnaja Volya. Though even in 2018, before the infamous 2020 elections and subsequent crackdown of all independent media, the circulation of these newspapers hardly reached 8000. Between 2020 and 2023, numerous newspapers were declared extremist: Novy Chas, Rehianalnaya Gazeta ("Regional Newspaper"), Nasha Niva, Intex-Press.

=== Publishing houses ===
State-run publishers are: Belarus Segodnya Publishing House (operates newspapers, Alfa Radio, etc.), Vysheysha shkola (academic books), Mastatskaya Litaratura, Narodnaya Asveta, Belkartografia, Aversev (academic books), the Belsoyuzpechat (national distributor), Four Quarters (books on the arts, history and geography), Belorusskaya Nauka (science), Tekhnologiya, Belovagroup, etc.

Independent publishers include Janushkevich, Knigazbor, Goliaths, Medisont, Limarius, Knihauka. All of them experience pressure from the authorities, obstruction of their activities, employees of some have been arrested.

=== Radio ===
In 2009, 158 radio stations were registered in the country, 137 state-owned and 21 private. By 2023, only 99 remained, 63 of them state-run.

Belteleradio, the state TV and radio service, operates five radio stations: Radius-FM, First National Channel, Stolitsa, and Radio Belarus for foreign audiences. Alfa Radio is operated by the state Belarus Segodnya Publishing House.

Radio 101.2 was a Minsk-based independent station which was closed by the government in 1996 and transferred to the Belarusian Republican Youth Union. The independent Autoradio was shut down in 2010. Declared extremist in Belarus, Euroradio and Radio Racja work in exile. In 2024, the RockRadioBY was launched in Ukraine.

=== TV ===
In 2018, TV served as a source of information for 72.0% of citizens, outperforming the Internet, which was a source for 60.4%. Daily TV viewership among Belarusians was 67.5%. It is monopolized by the government and managed by three biggest operator companies: STV, ONT, and BT-1. In the early 2000s, while the Russian mass media dominated in Belarus, it frequently invited Belarusian oppositioners and allowed criticism of Lukashenko. To avoid its influence, in 2002 a special presidential decree established the Second National Channel (BT-2) intending to replace Channel One Russia and also the amount of broadcast time allocated for the hugely popular Russian channels. Nowadays, the Media Law establishes a requirement for all editors of TV programs to ensure that the volume of TV programs of Belarusian (national) production is not less than 30%. Still, according to 2023 BBC analytics, Russian TV channels show higher viewership figures than Belarusian ones.

By June 2015, Belarus had completed the switch from analog to digital TV. There is no private or commercial TV in the country.

The Belteleradio operates channels Belarus-1, Belarus 2, Belarus 3, Belarus 4, Belarus 5, Belarus 24, NTV Belarus (the national version of NTV Russia with programmes from NTV Russia and other Russian channels).

The second largest state-run TV company is All-National TV, nowadays, it mostly broadcasts content of the Channel One Russia. Third leading channel is STV (Stolichnoye Televideniye), founded in 2000, rebroadcasts Russian REN TV.

Belsat TV, the first independent TV channel in Belarus, is in exile and bases in Poland. Svetlahorsk private TV and Radio company Ranak was closed by authorities in 2023 merely for coverage of the accident at the Svetlahorsk pulp and cardboard mill that caused the death of three factory workers.

=== Internet media ===
In 2009, 31% of the population of Minsk had Internet access; the percentage in other major cities was 12%. One hundred and eighty ISPs served 3.1 million users (470,000 broadband users). By different estimates, in 2022, the number of users amounted to 8-9.1 mln. According to the officials, 4G covers more that 76% of the territory and 97% of the population, while fixed broadband penetration rate is around 34%. The Internet in the country is controlled by Beltelecom and the republican company "National Center for Traffic Exchange", both have the technical means to shut down Internet connections in the country and effectively block media outlets. News sites from Central and Western Europe, Ukraine, and Russia, are not available in Belarus.

The repressive landscape of traditional media and the simultaneous expansion of Internet penetration resulted in an explosive growth of independent media resources on the Internet. All media centres also started to run their activities via the Internet. Although state-owned publications also tried to increase their presence on the Internet, independent publications dominated it and enjoyed incomparably greater trust of the audience. Projects, such as Charter 97, Naviny.by, Belarusian Partisan, Svaboda, functioned relatively free up until 2020. Sergei Tikhanovsky, for example, became famous for his YouTube channel "Country for Life" (Страна для жизни).

In mid-2021, the Belarusian government sharply tightened control over media publications on the Internet and unleashed a repressive campaign against independent publications and bloggers. As of 2024, all major independent news outlets inside Belarus were shut down. Social media and messaging platforms remain available, though individual bans are widely practised. Such websites as belaruspartisan.by and belsat.eu are available only via VPNs and TOR connections. popular Telegram channels like NEXTA Live (see Roman Protasevich) or Belarus Golovnogo Mozga were declared extremists. According to the current laws in Belarus web users and other media are held legally liable for reposting materials by media that was declared extremist.

=== Cinema ===
The country's main film studio is Belarusfilm, founded in 1924. Nowadays it has a full production cycle and produces up to 15 feature films yearly, as well as documentaries and animation.

During the Soviet era, Belarusfilms was nicknamed "Partizanfilm" due to its large number of films portraying the Soviet partisans' struggle against Nazi occupation. The studio, also noted for its children's films, has made over 130 animation films (most in Russian). Belarusfilm has produced about 10 feature films and four animated films per year since 1997. It is a co-organiser of the annual November Listapad film festival (Minsk International Film Festival) in Minsk.

== Unions and organizations ==
Belarus Union of Journalists was established in 1958 as a professional, independent organization of Belarusian mass-media workers. However, nowadays the Union is pro-governmental, in 2021 it suspended its participation in the International Federation of Journalists and its cooperation with the executive structures of the IFJ.

Belarusian journalists adopted two ethical codes in 1995: the Code of Professional Etiquette of the Journalist of the Belarus Union of Journalists and the Code of Journalistic Ethics of the Belarus Association of Journalists.

The Belarusian Association of Journalists, established in 1995, united professionals from independent media and strived to defend freedom of speech, freedom of information, promote the professional standards of journalism, conduct monitoring of Belarusian press, and offer legal support to all media workers. The Association experienced significant pressure from the authorities since the 2000s. It was closed by the officials in 2021. On 28 February 2023, the KGB has designated the Association as an 'extremist formation' meaning that a participation in it can be punished with a prison sentence.

== Sources ==
- "For Free and Fair Media in Belarus International Support Report" (PDF). 2009.
- "Belarus 2022". IREX Vibrant Information Barometer. 2022.

Ministry of Information of the Republic of Belarus
