= Oleg Grushecki =

Belarusian writer and translator (born 1974)

- Алег Грушэцкі
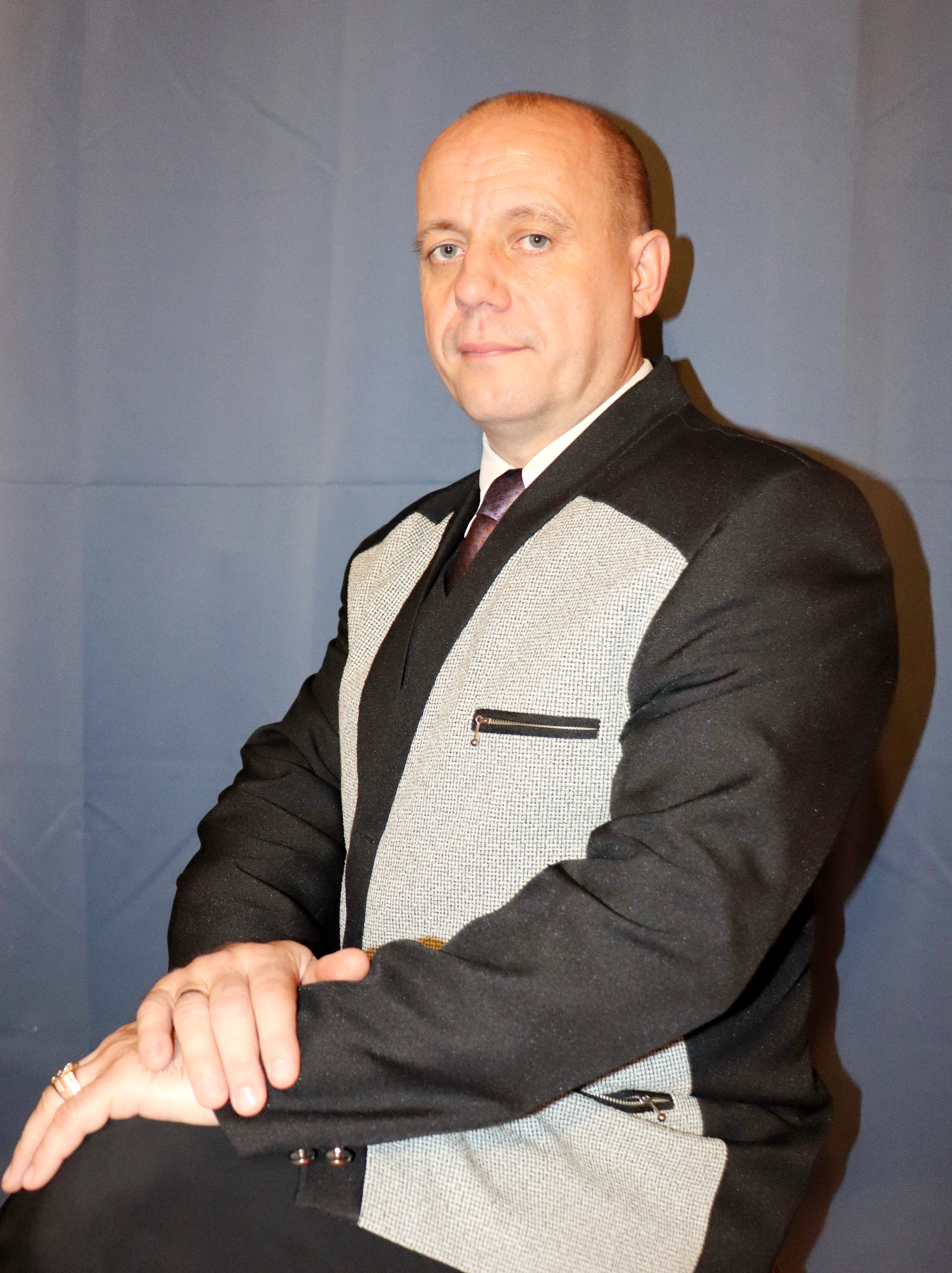
- Born: 8 May 1974; Minsk, Belarus
- Education: Republican Institute for Vocational Education, Polish Institute in Minsk
- Occupations: Writer, journalist, translator
- Writing career
- Language: Belarusian
- Years active: 1994–present
- Notable works: fantasy trilogy «The Knight of Yanka and the Princess of Milana»

Oleg Grushecki (Belarusian: Алег Грушэцкі; born 8 May 1974 in Minsk) is a Belarusian writer, journalist, translator, public figure. The revivalist of scouting in Belarus, one of the founders of the «Belarusian Scout Association». Author of literary and historical articles in both Belarusian and foreign scientific publications. Winner of a number of creative awards.

== Biography ==
Born on 8 May 1974, in Minsk. He studied at School No. 20 (now gymnasium No. 8). In his youth he did a lot of various sports. He started his career as a senior counselor at school No. 140 (1992).

In 1996, he studied at the RIVE (Republican Institute for Vocational Education) according to the curriculum «Enterprise management in a market economy» with the qualification «Manager-entrepreneur». Finished perfectly. Subsequently, he worked at the plant of complex automation tools of NPO «Granat» as a marketing department manager.

In 2019, he successfully completed his studies at the Polish Institute in Minsk, among the best graduates.

Father of three children.

=== Social activities ===
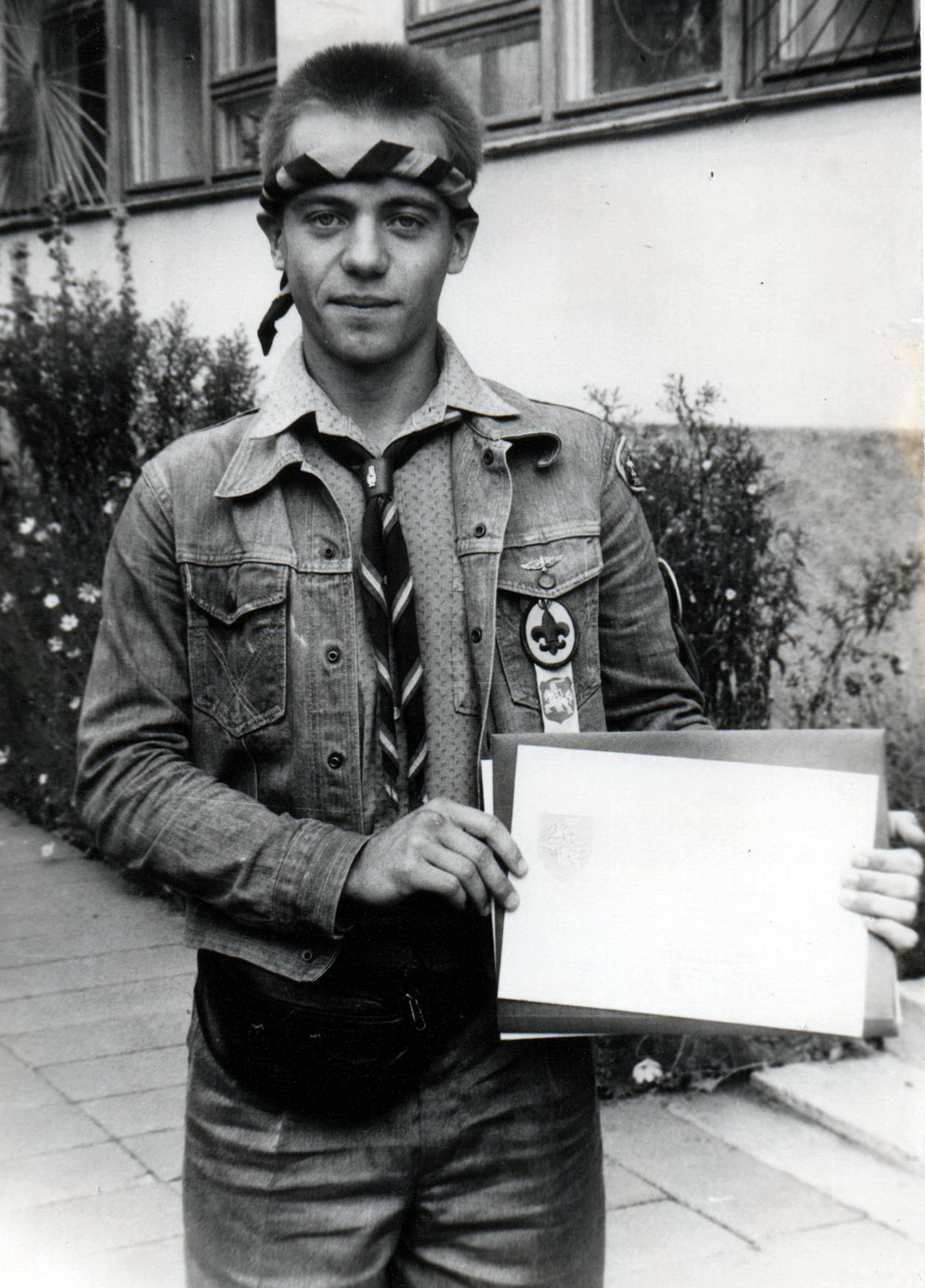
Oleg Grushecki with the certificate of the Ministry of Justice on the registration of the «Belarusian Scout Association» on the day of receipt of the certificate (12 August 1992)

Since 1987 – an active participant of the society «Talaka», which was engaged in the revival of Belarusian culture. In 1989, he was nominated to the Seym of «Talaka» as a member of the Council.

At the beginning of 1989, he became the youth leader of the «Belarusian Schoolchild Union» («BSU»).

In August 1989, he assembled the first scout detachment, which consisted mainly of schoolchildren of school No. 20, as well as members of the «BSU». The created detachment (consisting mainly of boys and several girls) took the name «Scythemen», in honor of Konstanty Kalinowski's scythemen. This was the first attempt to revive Belarusian scouting.

In August 1990, he took part in the opening of the first arrival of the first Belarusian–speaking children's camp «Grunwald» — solemnly raised the flag at the opening ceremony.

At the beginning of 1991 Oleg Grushecki published the first modern Belarusian scout publication – the newspaper «Scout of Belarus».

In 1991, he represented Belarus at the 17th World Scout Jamboree, held from 8 to 16 August in South Korea. Grushecki was the first (and at that time the only) Belarusian scout who represented Belarus at the world Jamboree (at the invitation of the world Scout leadership).

In 1992, he became one of the organizers of the Founding Seym of the «Belarusian Scout Association». On 21 March 21, 1992, during the constituent Seym, Oleg Grushecki was elected a member of the «BSA» Council. On 14 August 1992, in the Republican Scout camp «Lyasun», he passed the exams with the qualification of a Scout Master. On 15 November 1992, at the congress on the formation of the Minsk division named after Vytautas, he was elected a member of the council of the Minsk division.

In July 1993, he opened the first Jamboree «BSA» — lit a large Jamboree bonfire.

=== Writing career ===
In 1992, he began writing bard and scout songs. In 1993, he performed at the «III Belarusian Bard Song Festival» (28—29 August; dedicated to the Battle of Orsha). He performed several songs in the musical genre of blues rock for his poems and one for a poem by Anatoly Sys, after which he received good reviews from music critics and was invited to record his songs on Belradio. His songs, as poems, were first published in the magazine «Pershacvet» (No. 3, 1994).

Oleg Grushecki writes fairy tales, fantasy and poems in the Belarusian language). He published his works, as well as literary, biographical and journalistic articles in the Belarusian newspapers «Літаратура і мастацтва», «Настаўніцкая газета», «Культура», «Звязда», «Белорусская нива» («Сельская газета»), «Народная Воля», «Наша слова», «Новы Час», Polish «Gazeta Polska Codziennie», in the magazines «Маладосць», «Буся», «Бярозка», «Вясёлка», «Першацвет», «Роднае слова», Polish scientific and historical magazines «Mówią Wieki», «Rocznik Lubelski». Participates in creative events of the Poetic theater «Art.S». Some of Grushecki's poems are set to music.

According to Oleg Grushecki, Belarusian literature is distinguished by the spirit of mystery and mystery, a certain mysticism and mythologicalі. He considers literature «an integral part of culture, the basis on which the nation's consciousness is formed, its upbringing, and mentality is built. And also the cultural and intellectual level of those who are growing up is being formed».

== Awards ==
- 2015 – 2nd place at the competition «Belarusian Language Society» on the topic «Humanities. Personalities», for the article «Belarusian fantasy».
- 2016 – diploma and degrees of the republican contest of scientific research works «The memory of the genus: the past through the eyes of contemporaries» in the nomination «The history of one's own kind, family» (organized by the scientific and methodological journal of the Ministry of Education of the Republic of Belarus «Роднае слова»).
- 2017 – 1st place in the competition «Cultural perspective» of the newspaper «Літаратура і мастацтва».

=== Other ===
- 2019 – long list of the IV International Literary Contest «Russian Hoffman—2019», nomination «The prose is fabulous, fantastical».
- 2019 – the book «The Country of Measurement» entered the TOP 10 best books for children in the Belarusian language (according to Tut.By)
- 2020 – the book «The Country of Measurement» entered the TOP 12 best Belarusian children's publications

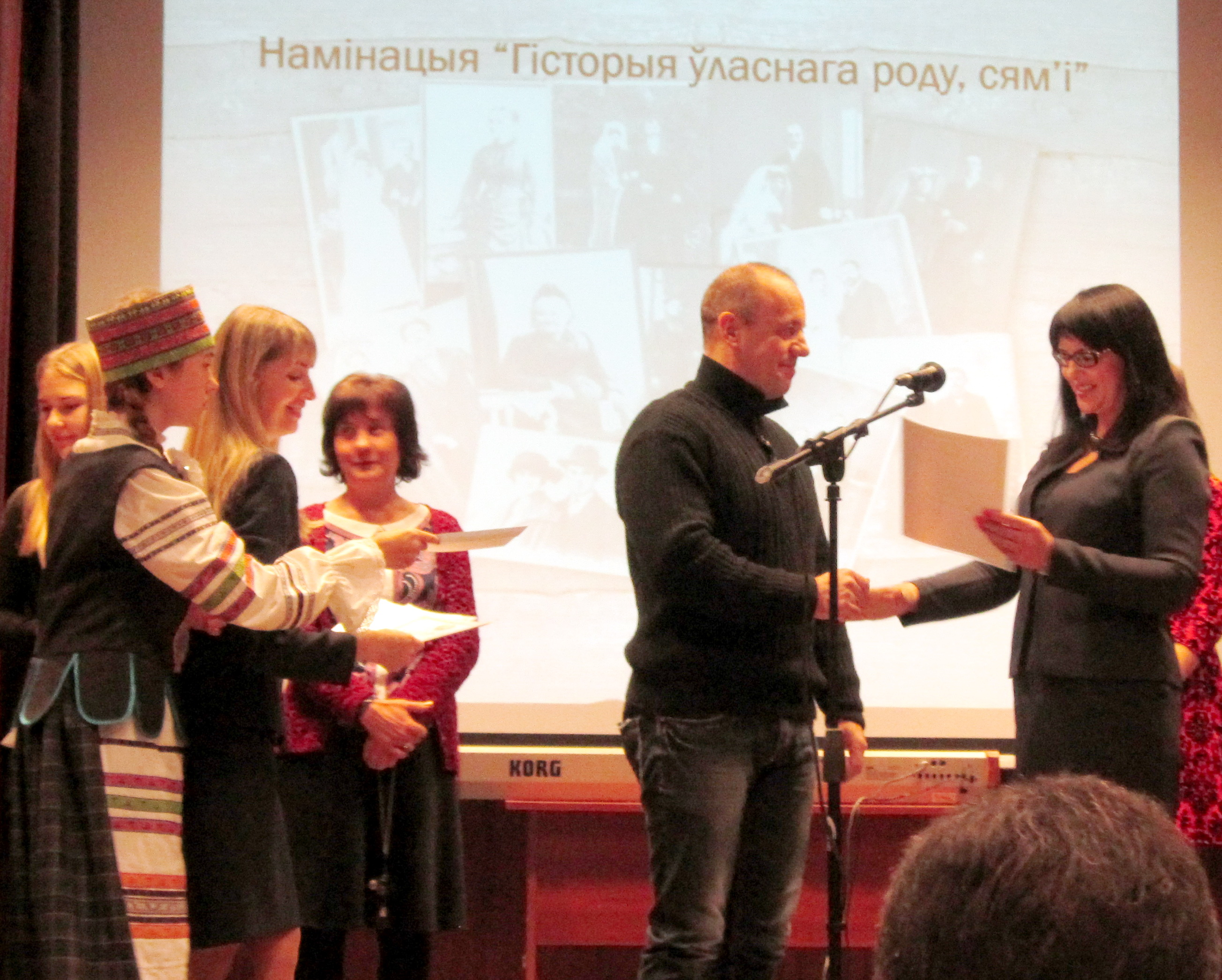
Awarding with a diploma of the first degree at the republican competition of scientific research works «The memory of the genus: the past through the eyes of contemporaries». Awarded by the Head of the Youth Affairs Department of the Ministry of Education of the Republic of Belarus N. Pshenichnaya

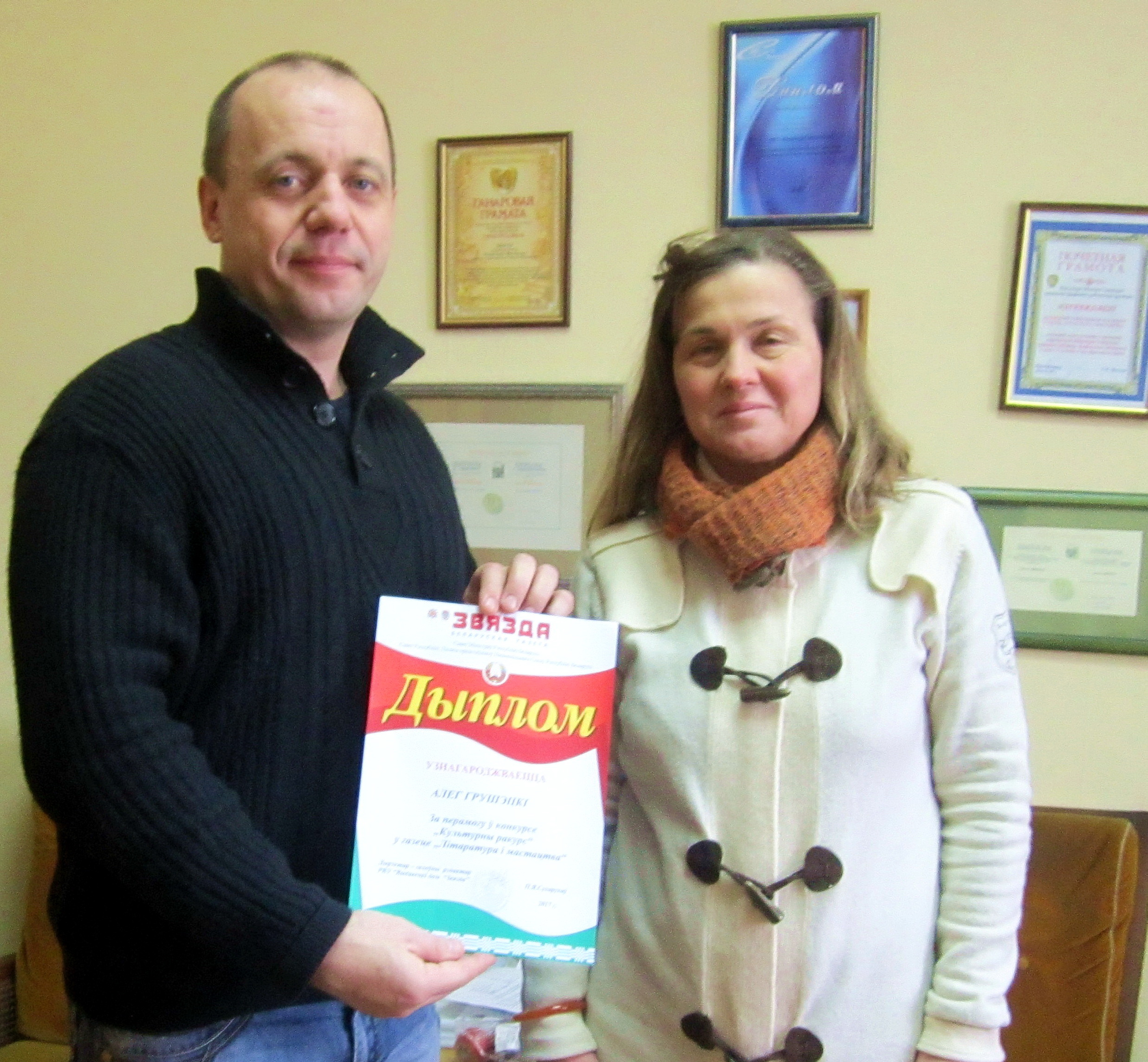
Awarding a diploma for the 1st place in the competition «Cultural perspective» of the newspaper «Літаратура і мастацтва». Together with the editor-in-chief of the newspaper «Літаратура і мастацтва» L. Timoshik

== Filmography ==
Year	Title	Role
2015	GaraSh	Mechanic
2016	PARTY-san movie	A soldier, a resident of the border zone

== Bibliography ==
- «Краіна Вымярэнія» («The Country of Measurement»). — Мн.: Кнігазбор, 2019. — 26 p. — ISBN 978-985-7227-01-3.
- «Рыцар Янка і каралеўна Мілана. Таямнічае каралеўства» («The knight of Yanka and the princess of Milana. The mysterious kingdom»). — Minsk: Four quarters, 2021. — 224 p. — ISBN 978-985-581-420-8.
- «Рыцар Янка і каралеўна Мілана. Каралеўству патрэбны героі» («The knight of Yanka and the princess of Milana. The kingdom needs heroes»). — Minsk: Four quarters, 2022. — 276 p. — ISBN 978-985-581-506-9.
- «Рыцар Янка і каралеўна Мілана. Агонь і лёд» («The knight of Yanka and the princess of Milana. Fire and ice»). — Minsk: Four quarters, 2023. — 272 p. — ISBN 978-985-581-632-5.

=== In collections ===
- Grushecki O. Жаўнер i вужалка (Soldier and vužalka (grass snake-girl)// Нявеста для Базыля: казкі (A bride for Basil : fairy tales) / the compiler А. Sprynchan. — Minsk: Мастацкая літаратура, 2017. — P. 52—70. — 214 p.
- Grushecki O Дзяцей ён выхоўваў у любові да кніг. Пра педагога Янку Маўра (He raised his children in love with books. About the teacher Yanka Maur) // Янка Маўр. Наш вечны рабінзон: штрыхі да партрэта (Yanka Maur. Our eternal Robinson: touches to the portrait) / the compiler M. Mickevich. — Minsk: Мастацкая літаратура, 2018. — P. 85—88. — 127 p.
- Grushecki O Шыншыла (верш-скарагаворка) (Chinchilla (tongue twister poem)) // Літаратурнае чытанне. 4 клас. Чытаем разам з буслікам (Literary reading. 4th class. We read together with the stork) / the compiler Kalinichenka. — Minsk: Сэр-Віт, 2020. — С. 4. — 72 с. — (Школьная праграма (School curriculum)).
- Grushecki O Як Ясь братоў ленавацца адвучыў (How Yas' weaned his brothers from laziness) // Бульбінка: творы пра любімую беларусамі бульбу (Potato: works about the potato beloved by Belarusian) / the compiler А. Sprynchan. — Minsk: Мастацкая літаратура, 2021. — P. 86—88. — 94 p. — (Нашы сімвалы (Our symbols)).
