= Vestnik =

Vestnik (Russian: вестник) or vesnik (Macedonian: весник) means messenger or herald in several Slavic languages, and is used as a generic name in various news publications. It may refer to

== Vestnik ==
- Armianskiy Vestnik (Armenian Herald), Armenian-Russian magazine published in Moscow from 1916 to 1918
- Vilenskij Vestnik (Vilnian Herald), newspaper published in Vilnius from 1840 to 1915.
- Bogoslovni vestnik (Theological Quarterly), peer-reviewed journal on theology
- Meditsinskiy Vestnik (Medical Herald), Russian language newspaper published in Belarus
- Planinski Vestnik (magazine), Slovenian monthly magazine
- Severny Vestnik (Northern Herald), Russian literary magazine
- Vestnik Evropy (Herald of Europe), the major liberal magazine of late-nineteenth-century Russia
- Vestnik Manʹchzhurii (Manchuria Monitor), journal of the economy of Manchuria published from 1923
- Vestnik Teatra (Theatre Courier), the journal of the Theatre Department of Narkompros, founded in Moscow in 1919

== Vesnik ==
- Utrinski vesnik, a daily newspaper in Macedonia
- Yevgeny Vesnik (1923–2009), Russian stage and a film actor
- Vjesnik, a Croatian daily newspaper
