= Vasily Tyorkin (Boborykin) =

Novel by Pyotr Boborykin

Vasily Tyorkin (Russian: Василий Тёркин) is an 1892 novel by Russian writer Pyotr Boborykin a story of a businessman (kupets (Note: In Russian language the term kupets, literally meaning "merchant", used to denote other types of entrepreneurs, in particular, industrialists, who evolved from the kupets sosloviye. — "Купечество" . Great Soviet Encyclopedia (in Russian). 1926–1947.)) with elements of coming of age, who made himself coming from a peasant family, whose father had a small candle factory. Unlike a common portrayal of nouveau riches, greedy, ruthless, uneducated, Boborykin's Tyorkin studied in a gymnasium and cares about other people and "native lands".

The novel has nothing in common with the poem Vasily Tyorkin by Soviet author Aleksandr Tvardovsky.

== Plot ==
In his youth, Tyorkin was expelled from the gymnasium due to a conflict with a teacher. His studies were paid by the obshchina of his native village, therefore in order to avoid a humiliating punishment of flogging, he spent a year in a mental asylum pretending to be out of his mind. This resulted in an overwhelming desire to leave his low sosloviye. He started little trading and in 10 years of hard work he became a prosperous businessman, an owner of a steamship and a director of a timber business. He gained a reputation of a decent, honest person.>

There are three women and two love stories in Tyorkin's life. The first love was Serafima, a "femme fatale", but he eventually he leaves her because she is not very decent (having a "stretchable conscience"). He then meets Kaleria, a beautiful, educated nurse, who suddenly gets ill and dies. Grieving Tyorkin retreats to a monastery, where he finds the same vanity as in the lay world. He proposes to Aleksandra whom he does not love, but he does this as yet another good deed.

After all his life vagaries his luck did not abandon him and he grew even richer.

== Commentary ==
Bolshevik-leaning Russian writer Maxim Gorky characterized Tyorkin as a "politically thinking kupets". He also noted that Boborykin's Tyorkin was received better than his other novels by critics only because the Russian liberal intelligentsia saw Tyorkin close to European bourgeoisie, unlike wild Moscow merchants portrayed by Alexander Ostrovsky.

Tyorkin is a controversial figure. Coming from commoners' background, Tyorkin dreams to live like a nobleman and despises peasants and "factory rubble". Boasting honesty, he has an affair with Serafima, a married woman, and takes money of dubious provenance from her to buy a steamship. However his conscience is clear: everybody is stealing everywhere without shame and restraint, and what is stolen is shamelessly wasted, and Tyorkin says to himself "Isn't he, Tyorkin, doing a good deed, snatching the nation's wealth from such hands? This isn't kulakism, not profiteering, but a mission!"

== Relation to Tvardovsky's Tyorkin ==
In 1952, Aleksandr Tvardovsky published a question-and-answer brochure, '"How I wrote Vasily Tyorkin". Answering the question about the coincidence of the name of the character in his poem Vasily Tyorkin about an optimistic Soviet soldier, he wrote he had learned about Boborykin's novel only when a considerable part of his poem had already been published. The two characters have nothing in common. Tvardovsky wrote that he was unimpressed with Boborykin's novel.
