= Karen Mikaelyan =

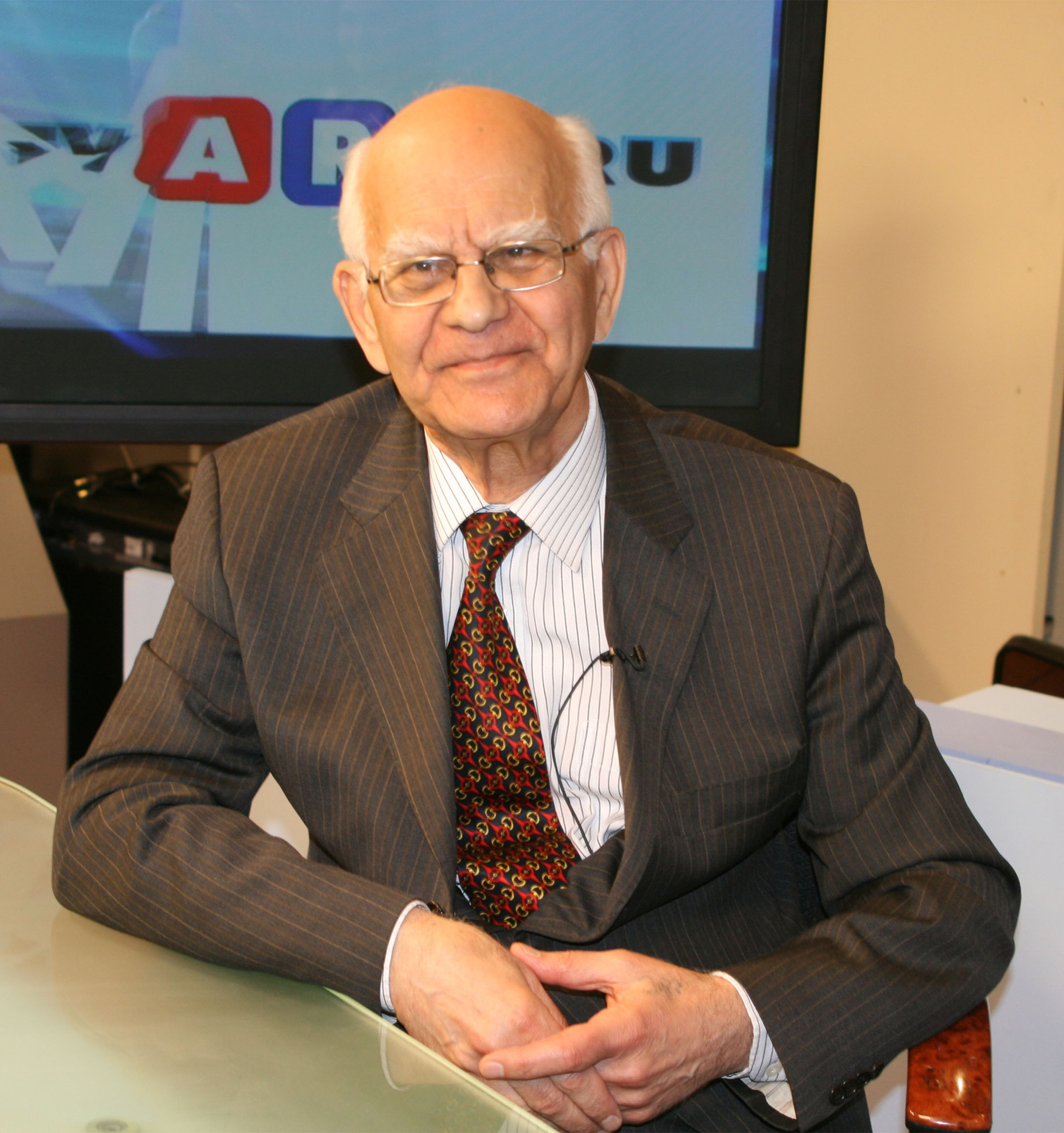
- Born: May 18, 1932 (age 94); Yerevan, Armenia
- Education: National Polytechnic University of Armenia
- Occupations: politician, diplomat, civic leader, and publicist

Karen Mikaelyan (Armenian: Կարեն Միքայելյան; born May 18, 1932) is an Armenian-Russian politician, diplomat, civic leader, and publicist.

== Biography ==
Mikaelyan was born in Yerevan, Armenia. His father was born in Alashkert (Western Armenia, Ottoman Empire), and his mother was born in Oshakan (Eastern Armenia, Russian Empire). He finished high school in the Russian town of Sorokino, Altai Krai of RSFSR, USSR, where his family was deported amongst numerous other Armenian families during the period of Stalin repressions from their home and place of permanent residence to Siberia. In 1956, Mikaelyan graduated from the engineering department of the Yerevan Polytechnic Institute with a specialization in machinery. In 1974, he graduated from the Faculty of International Economics of the All-Union Academy of Foreign Trade, which aimed to prepare Soviet diplomats for working in international organizations.

== Professional career ==
From 1956 through 1966, Mikaelyan worked as a design engineer at the Automatic Line Plant in Minsk, Byelorussian SSR, and at the Factory of Boring Machines in Lusavan, Armenian SSR.

From 1966 through 1971, he worked at the State Planning Committee of the Government of Armenian SSR as a head of the department of material funds.

From 1974 through 1976 and from 1981 through 1991, he worked at the State Committee on Science and Technology of the Council of Ministers of the Soviet Union as a head of the bureau of scientific and technological cooperation with foreign countries.

From 1976 through 1981, he worked at the United Nations Industrial Development Organization (UNIDO) in Vienna, Austria. He served as a supervisor of the department with the professional level of P5 and was in charge of organizing industrial support to developing countries in Eastern Europe and Southeast Asia. During his tenure in office, he completed multimillion-dollar programs allotted by the United Nations Development Programme (UNDP) for industrial construction projects in Vietnam, Mongolia, and Afghanistan.

From 1991 through 1996, he served first as a deputy chairman and then as an acting chairman of the Committee for Relations with Armenian Diaspora in the Government of Armenia. The goal of his appointment was to foster the reorganization and restructuring of the Armenian diaspora in order to form and develop the so-called Armenian factor in international politics. In 1994, he facilitated the establishment of the Confederation of Armenian Communities headquartered in Simferopol of Crimea and the publication of the Confederation's periodical gazette World Armenian Congress.

Under the Committee for Relations with the Armenian Diaspora, he established an official monthly newspaper, Hayutyun, in the second issue of which Mikaelyan published an article discussing the need for the convention of an All-Armenian World Congress.

== Public activities ==
In 1996, Mikaelyan put forward an initiative to call the Third Congress of Western Armenians, composed of the descendants of the Ottoman Armenians, the citizens of Ottoman Empire of Armenian nationality, in order to establish the plenipotentiary and representative body of Western Armenians in exile. The First and the Second Congresses of Western Armenians took place in Yerevan in 1917 and 1919, accordingly.

In 1997, he was elected the executive director of the International Organizing Committee on preparing and holding the Third Congress of Western Armenians.

On December 10–11 of 2011, the Third Congress of Western Armenians, which took place in Sevres (Paris, France), established the plenipotentiary and representative body of Western Armenians - the National Congress of Western Armenians (NCWA). Karen Mikaelyan was elected the Deputy Chairman of the NCWA.

The aim of the organization was proclaimed to achieve protection of the rejected interests and to recover the violated rights of Western Armenians, as well as achievement of reparations and compensations for the moral, human, material, and territorial damages aggrieved during the Armenian genocide. Mikaelyan is also a co-chairman of the Association of Fellow-Countrymen of Western Armenians of Moscow.

== Publication of journals ==
In order to facilitate the formation of modern Armenian national and public thinking, Mikaelyan resumed the Moscow edition of the socio-political journal Armianskiy Vestnik, where he appeared with numerous articles devoted to the Armenian Question.

With the aim of promoting a political doctrine of Russian democratic patriots, Mikaelyan initiated the publication of Manifesto of Democrats and Statists, which appeared in Nezavisimaya Gazeta on September 16, 1997. Mikaelyan also renewed the edition of the socio-political journal Grazhdanin where, amongst other prominent scholars, he published articles on Russian political studies. Grazhdanin was registered by the Ministry of Communications and Mass Media of the Russian Federation (PI No.77-14999, 03.04.2003) as a renewed edition of the magazine that was being published before the October overturn. The founders were Alexander Bessmertnykh (the USSR Minister of Foreign Affairs), Karen Mikaleyan, and Vachagan Petrosyan. Among the members of the editorial board are Alexander Yakovlev (former Secretary of the Communist Party), Sergey Filatov (former chief of staff of the Presidential Administration of Russia), Arkady Volsky, Andrei Zubov, Mikhail Delyagin, Vladimir Makhnach, etc.

== Ideological views ==
Karen Mikaelyan advocates the formation of Armenian national and state political thinking, based on the critical analysis of the historical path, traversed from the mid-19th century through today, particularly during the period of the so-called Armenian Liberation Movement, which is known as one of the most fatal periods in the history of the Armenian nation.

In his articles, Karen Mikaelyan scrutinizes the actions of carriers and followers of the Ideology of the Western Armenian Revolution (as defined by the Armenian historian Leo) which failed to prevent the national disaster of Meds Yeghern. He also analyzes the causes of the loss of sovereignty of the First Armenian Republic, followed by dismemberment of its territories under the joint Bolshevik-Kemalist aggression in 1920–21. Karen Mikaelyan is the author of articles on the origins of the Nagorno-Karabakh conflict and his expert recommendations on solving the conflict as part of the yet unsolved Armenian Question. The ideological basis of his views on the Karabakh problem is that he considers the beginning of the conflict not in 1989, as it's widely considered, but in 1921, with the unlawful act of the Soviet government, which handed over the Nagorno-Karabakh and Nakhichevan regions to the Azerbaijan Soviet Socialist Republic.

Thus he sees the path of liberation of Karabakh not through the national self-determination and the consequent creation of a second Armenian republic, but as the act of the reunion of the divided Armenian nation and the partial restoration of the territorial integrity of the Armenian state.

By reviving the Russian newsmagazine Grazhdanin, Mikaelyan sought to actualize the problem of continuity of Russian statehood, which was ruined as a consequence of the counter-revolutionary coup in October 1917, which has interrupted the process of establishing a Russian federal democratic state that had started with the February 1917 Democratic Revolution.

The October 1917 coup d’état resulted in artificially created Soviet Socialist Republics on the former provinces of the Russia Empire - in fact subservient states integrated into a unitary union state – with conventional and unlawfully defined borders, which during the collapse of Soviet Union and after the Belavezha accords, signed without indispensable negotiations on the revision of the old boundaries making sense only in a unitary state, has become a source of numerous ethnic and territorial conflicts in the post-Soviet space, as well as the cause of the loss of tens of thousands of square kilometers of historical Russian territories populated with over 25 million ethnic Russians.

Mikaelyan sees the need for the formation of financial and political power, which should represent an alliance of emerging national capital and national-oriented Russian intellectuals able to consolidate the nation around the idea of revival and the development of a free, independent, and progressive Russia through complete political, cultural, and ideological complete de-Sovietization, which could help Russia to take its rightful place in the process of developing a more humane and just world order.
