= Alena Anisim =

Belarusian politician and linguist

- Алена Анісім
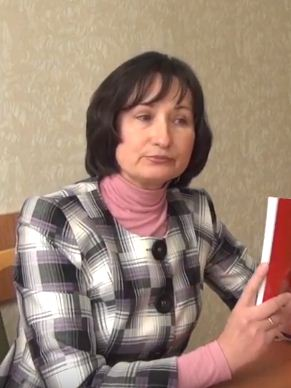
- Anisim in 2015

Member of the House of Representatives of Belarus
- In office 2016–2019

Personal details
- Born: Alena Mikalajeŭna Amelčyc; 28 September 1962 (age 63) Stoŭbcy, Byelorussian SSR, Soviet Union
- Party: Independent
- Education: Belarusian State University
- Awards: Belarusian Democratic Republic 100th Jubilee Medal (2018)

Alena Mikalajeŭna Anisim (Note: Belarusian: Але́на Мікала́еўна Ані́сім Russian: Еле́на Никола́евна Ани́сим, romanized: Yelena Nikolayevna Anisim) (née Amelčyc; (Note: Belarusian: Амельчыц Russian: Амельчиц) born 28 September 1962) is a Belarusian opposition politician, linguist and former member of the House of Representatives of Belarus, the lower house of the National Assembly of Belarus. She is additionally the head of the banned Francišak Skaryna Belarusian Language Society.

Anisim was born on 28 September 1962 into a peasant family in the town of Stoŭbcy, Minsk Region.

In 1983, she graduated from the Faculty of Philology of Belarusian State University. She then worked as a nursery school and secondary school teacher. From 1991, she was a research associate in the Yakub Kolas Institute of Linguistics of the National Academy of Sciences of Belarus. Since 2017, she has been the chairperson of the Francišak Skaryna Belarusian Language Society. From 2017 to 2018, she actively promoted the creation of the first Belarusian-language university, named after Nil Hilevich, in Minsk. However, the project was rejected by the Education Ministry.

In 2014, Anisim became a coordinator of the all-Belarusian Congress for Independence. That same year, the Belarusian Congress of Intellectuals nominated her for the presidency. However, having started a company, she abruptly withdrew from the race.

In 2016, she and Hanna Kanapatskaya were elected to the House of Representatives of Belarus, the first two opposition politicians to gain seats in twenty years. When trying to register their candidacies for the 2019 elections, they were refused by the Lukashenko regime's Central Election Commission.

In 2019, she announced her candidacy for President of Belarus. After it was also rejected, she returned to the Yakub Kolas Institute after completing her term at the House of Representatives.
