= Nasha Slova =

- Language: Belarusian
- Sister newspapers: Novy Chas
- Website: nslowa.by

Nasha Slova (Belarusian: Наша слова [ˈnaʂa ˈsɫova]) is a newspaper published in Belarus.

== Profile ==
The publisher of Nasha Slova is the Frantsishak Skaryna Belarusian Language Society. Its sister newspaper is Novy Chas, a weekly paper.

== See also ==
- List of newspapers in Belarus
