= Nil Hilevich =

Belarusian poet

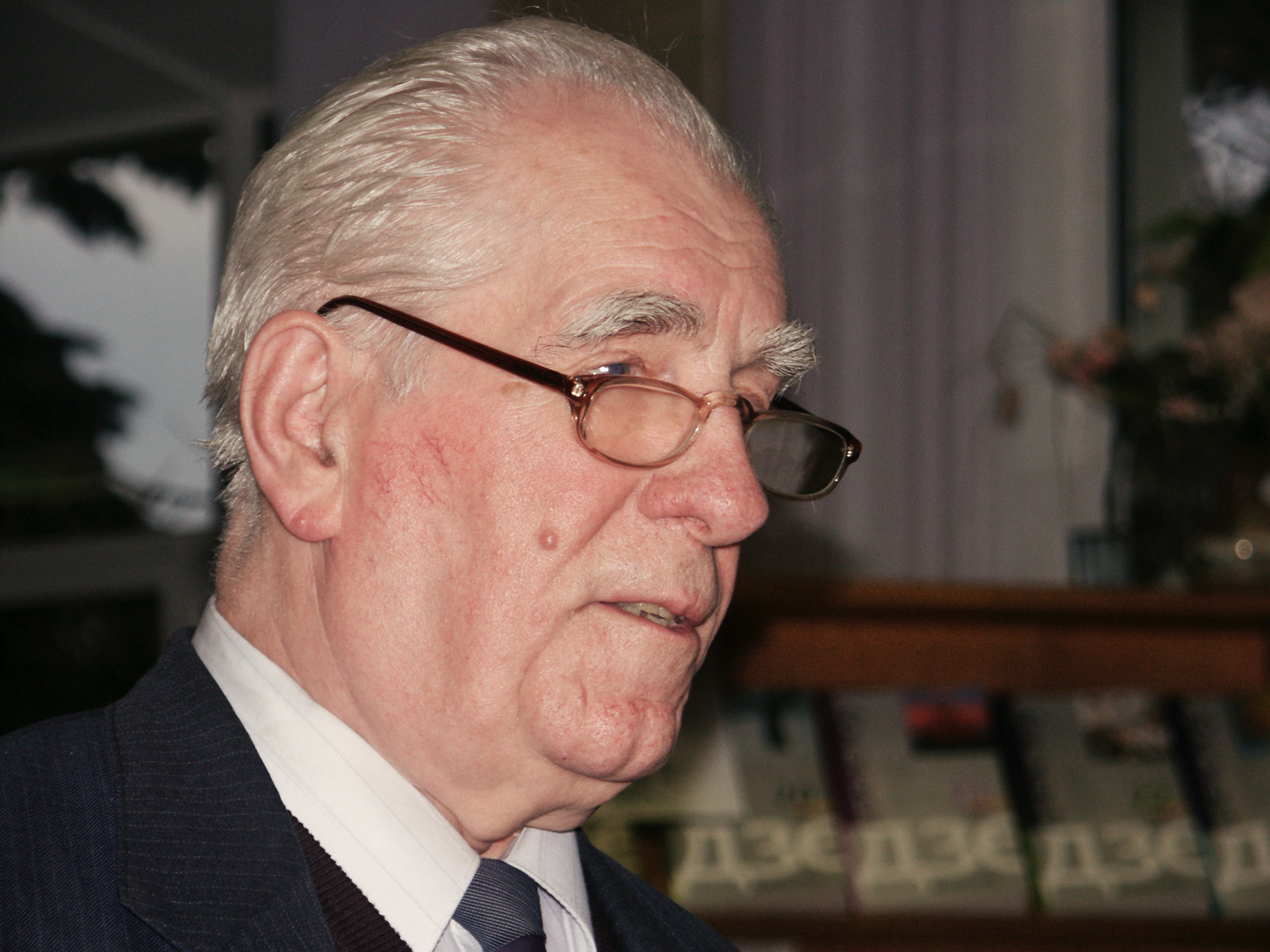
Nil Hilevich

Nil Symonavich Hilevich (Belarusian: Ніл Сымонавіч Гілевіч, romanized: Nil Symonavič Hilevič; Russian: Нил Семёнович Гилевич, romanized: Nil Semyonovich Gilevich; 30 September 1931 – 29 March 2016) was a Belarusian poet, a professor in the Belarusian State University, the author of more than 80 books of poetry, publications, and translations, and one of the founders of the Francišak Skaryna Belarusian Language Society.

== Biography ==
Nil Hilevich was born in the village of Slabada (Słabada), in the Lahoisk (Łahojsk) District of Minsk Province. He studied in a college in Minsk (from which he graduated in 1951), preparing to be a teacher. During the last year in college he worked as a teacher in one of the schools in Minsk. He continued his education at the Belarusian State University (the Faculty of Philology), and graduated in 1956. During 1960-1986 he was working at the university, and later on became a professor. In 1958 he started to work for the newspaper Zvyazda (Belarusian Звязда). In 1978 Hilevich joined the Communist Party. In 1980 he became the executive secretary of the Writer's Union of BSSR, and held that position for 9 years. In 1989 he became a chairperson of the Francišak Skaryna Belarusian Language Society. He also was the chief editor of the Society's bulletin Наша слова (literally: Our Word). In 1991 Nil Hilevich received a People's Poet of Belarus nomination. He has also received some other awards in literature.

== Works ==
Hilevich was first published in 1946. And only after eleven years he published his verse collection, Песьня ў дарогу (literally: Song of the Road). The book was followed by Прадвесьне ідзе па зямлі (literally: A Feeling of Spring Passes over the Earth in 1959), Неспакой (Disquiet; 1961), Бальшак (The Highway; 1965), Перазовы (Exchanges; 1967), А дзе ж тая крынічанька? (And Where is That Little Spring?; 1972), Актавы (Octaves; 1976), У добрай згодзе (In Good Agreement; 1979), Повязь (A Tie; 1987). Hilevich has also published a number of humorous and satirical books, such as

- Званковы валет (The Jack of Diamonds; 1961)
- Да новых венікаў (To New Wreaths; 1963)
- Ці грэх, ці 2 (A Sin or Two; 1970), Як я вучыўся жыць (How I Learnt to Live; 1974)
- Русалка на Нарачы (Mermaid in the Narač; 1974).

Nil Hilevich translates Bulgarian, Slovenian, Polish, Lithuanian, Ukrainian, and Russian prose and poetry into Belarusian. He also has written poetic verses for children, such as

- Сіні домік, сіні дом (Little Blue House, Blue House; 1961)
- Зялёны востраў (The Green Island;1963)
- Добры чалавек (The Good Man; 1981).

In 1981 his chosen works were published in a two part book. Hilevich wrote some plays which were published as a separate book Начлег на бусьлянцы (A Night In The Stork's Nest) in 1980. His novel Перажыўшы вайну (Having Survived the War) was published in 1988. Nil Hilevich is a productive poet, also known for writing a number of books literary criticism, translations folkloric studies such as

- Наша родная песня (Our Native Song; 1968)
- Вусная народная творчасць і сучасная лірычная паэзія ўсходніх і паўднёвых славян (The Folklore And Modern Poetry of The Eastern and Southern Slavic Peoples; 1978).

In 2009 his chosen works were published in a book in Minsk. The book has 600 pages and contains the most important works of Hilevich.
