= GaraSh =

2015 film by Andrei Kureichik

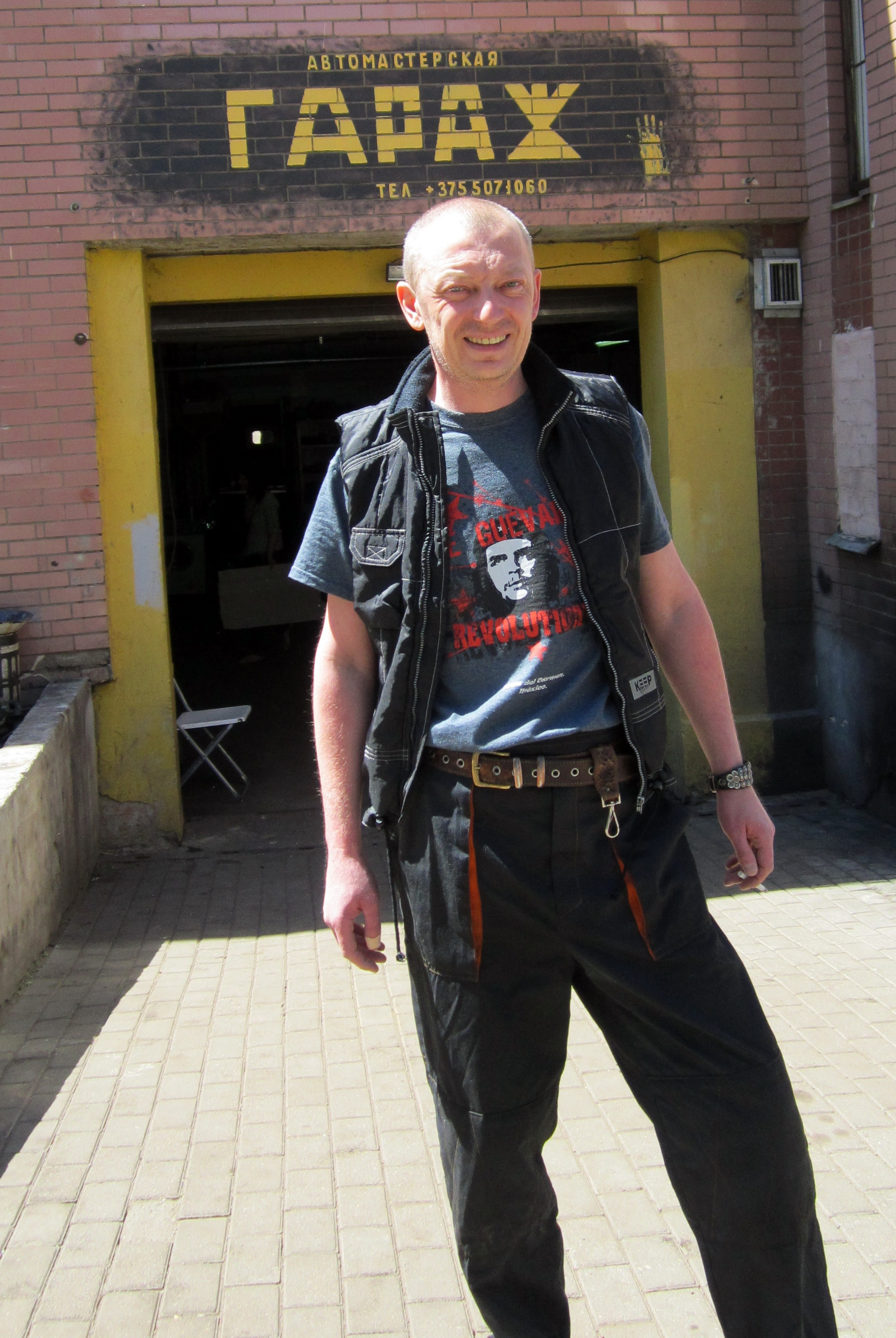
- Alexandr Kullinkovich posing behind the scenes of «GaraSh» movie in Minsk, Belarus
- Directed by: Andrei Kureichik
- Written by: Andrei Kureichik
- Produced by: Andrei Kureichik, Dmitry Friga
- Starring: Alexandr Kullinkovich, Yuri Naumov, Artem Kuren
- Cinematography: Nikita Pinigin, Alexandr Krupina
- Edited by: Sergey Dmitrenko
- Music by: Dmitry Friga
- Distributed by: BezBuslou Arts
- Release date: 7 November 2015
- Running time: 45/61 minutes
- Country: Belarus
- Languages: Russian, Belarusian

GaraSh (Belarusian: ГараШ) is a Belarusian comedy film first released in 2015, directed by Andrei Kureichik.

== Plot ==
This dark comedy about car mechanics working in the Shabany district on the outskirts of Minsk reveals a clash of civilisations. The young hero, born in Belarus, has lived and worked in the USA under the program Work & Travel five years, adopted that lifestyle and made the "American dream" his formula for happiness. On his return to Belarus he works in a Shabany garage which has its own philosophy; a different view of reality, closer to that of the Soviet Union.

== Cast ==
- Aleksandr Kullinkovich: Boris Grigorievich, senior mechanic
- Yuri Naumov: Auto Electrician
- Vitaly Kuren: Artem Borzov, «American»
- Vasily Nitsko: Ivan Ivanovich, a government official
- Elizaveta Shukova: a client of the garage, the daughter of an official
- Vadim Gaidukovsky: Seller of auto parts
- Evelina Sakuro: Stripper
- Oleg Grushecki: Mechanic
- Egor Zabelov: Grisha, musician
