= Aleh Trusaŭ =

Belarusian academic and politician (born 1954)

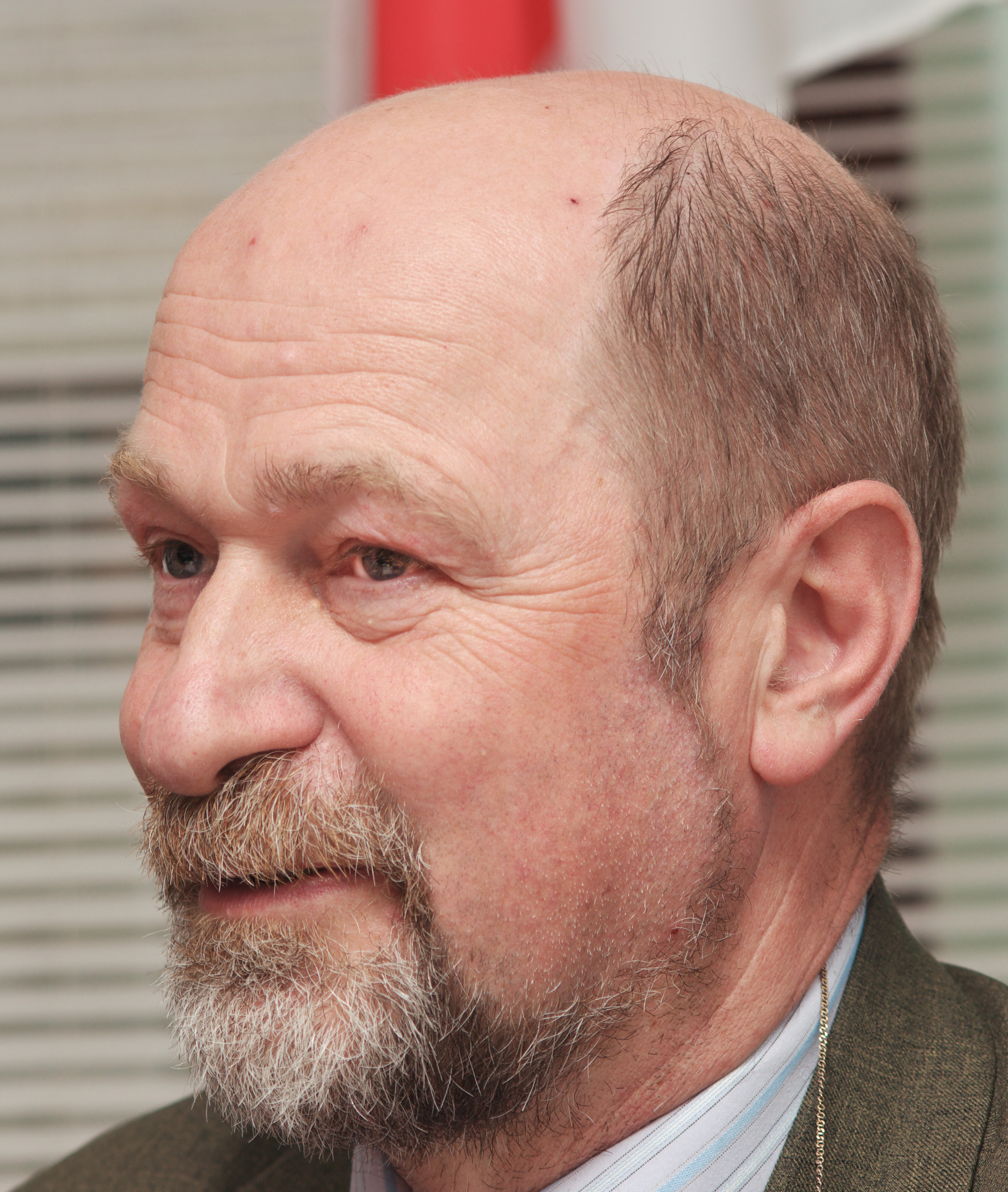

Legislator to the Supreme Council of Belarus
- In office 1990–1995
- Parliamentary group: Belarusian Social Democratic Assembly

Chairman of the Belarusian Social Democratic Assembly
- In office 1992 – July 1995
- Preceded by: Michaś Tkačoŭ
- Succeeded by: Mikola Statkevich
- Parliamentary group: Belarusian Social Democratic Assembly

Deputy Chairman of the Belarusian Social Democratic Assembly
- Incumbent
- Assumed office February 15, 1998
- Parliamentary group: Belarusian Social Democratic Assembly

Personal details
- Born: August 7, 1954 (age 72) Mstsislaw, Belarus

Aleh Anatolievich Trusaŭ (Belarusian: Алег Анатольевіч Трусаў, Russian: Олег Анатольевич Трусов, romanized: Oleg Anatoljewicz Trusow; born 7 August 1954 in Mstsislaw) is a Belarusian historian, archaeologist, politician, and social activist. He is one of the founders of the BPF Party and the Belarusian Social Democratic Assembly, both of which are organizations and parties with a national and independence-oriented character. From 1990 to 1995, he was a deputy to the Supreme Soviet of the Byelorussian Soviet Socialist Republic/Supreme Council of Belarus of the 12th convocation and a member of the BPF Party parliamentary opposition faction. He holds the academic title of Candidate of Sciences and is a historian specializing in Belarusian architecture. Since 1999, he has been the chairman of the Francišak Skaryna Belarusian Language Society.

== Early life ==
Aleh Trusaŭ was born on 7 August 1954 in Mstsislaw, Mogilev Region, Byelorussian Soviet Socialist Republic. In his family, communists were disliked, and no one was a member of the Communist Party of the Soviet Union. During his childhood, he was raised by his great-grandmother Maryja Drazdouska, the wife of a Belarusian nobleman, who often spoke of the suffering the family experienced in 1918 when the communists confiscated their property. This had an impact on Trusaŭ's later skeptical attitude toward communism.

He studied at the Faculty of History at the Belarusian State University. In his fifth year, he received a Lenin Scholarship of 100 rubles and was the head of his group. When he was offered membership in the Communist Party of the Soviet Union and a postgraduate position at the Department of Scientific Communism, he declined. In 1976, he graduated and was assigned to work in the restoration workshops of the Ministry of Culture of the Belarusian SSR. There, he first met nationally oriented people striving for the revival of Belarusian culture and language, including Zianon Pazniak. After starting a correspondence postgraduate program at the Institute of History of the National Academy of Sciences of Belarus, he met Belarusian historians with similar views, such as Michaś Tkačoŭ and Anatol Hrytskevich. He also established contacts with academic circles in neighboring Lithuania, who impressed him with their patriotism and dreams of liberating their country from Soviet occupation.

Aleh Trusaŭ noticed that many of these people were communists, members of the Communist Party of the Soviet Union. He concluded that the path to Belarusian national revival lay through evolutionary changes within the Communist Party. Therefore, when in 1978 he was again offered membership in the party, after consulting with Zianon Pazniak, he applied for membership.

In 1980, Trusaŭ completed his postgraduate studies. In 1981, he defended his candidate dissertation and obtained the degree of Candidate of Historical Sciences. The topic of his dissertation was Monumental Building Monuments of Belarus in the 11th–17th Centuries. Architectural and Archaeological Analysis. From 1976 to 1991 (according to other sources, from 1976 to 1992), he worked as a research associate and later head of the Department of Comprehensive Scientific Research at the Belarusian Conservation Design Institute. In 1988, the topic of his doctoral dissertation was determined, but he never defended it.

=== Early political and social activism ===
In 1979, already a party member, Trusaŭ participated with a group of architects and historians led by Zianon Pazniak in a successful campaign to preserve the historical center of Minsk. He later expressed that this was possible partly due to his access to the First Secretary of the Communist Party of Byelorussia, Pyotr Masherov. In the 1980s, he headed the basic organizational cell of the Communist Party of the Soviet Union at his workplace. It was the first in the Soviet district of Minsk to start writing its reports in Belarusian. This event was announced in the Belarusian media.

On 19 October 1988 (according to him, partly by accident), he participated in the founding conference of the "Martyrology of Belarus" at the Church of Saints Simon and Helena in Minsk, where he was elected to the newly formed Organizing Committee of the BPF Party – the first anti-communist and independence organization in Belarus of that period. On Monday, October 24, he was publicly condemned at a meeting of Communist Party secretaries of the Soviet district of Minsk for his participation. His speech caused a significant stir among the attendees, some of whom left the hall, some attacked him, and some defended him. Simultaneously, the state press started a campaign against all BPF Party activists, calling them scum on the wave of perestroika. In June 1989, at the Founding Congress of the BPF Party, he was elected to the first Sejm of the BPF Party – the governing body of the organization.

In 1989, he represented democratic-minded communists from the Soviet district of Minsk at the Democratic Platform Communist Party congress in Moscow, aimed at reforming the party and transforming it into a social-democratic group. This initiative failed, but through it, Trusaŭ established contacts with Russian democrats within the communist party – Yury Afanasyev, General Oleg Kalugin, Gleb Yakunin, and others.

In the same year, he co-founded the Francišak Skaryna Belarusian Language Society.

=== Parliamentary activity ===
In 1990, Aleh Trusaŭ was nominated by the Belarusian Language Society as a candidate in the 1990 Belarusian Supreme Soviet election. He won a seat as a People's Deputy from the electoral district No. 33 in Minsk. Trusaŭ joined the BNF Parliamentary Group (known as the BNF Opposition from July 16) and became its deputy chairman under Zianon Pazniak in early June 1990. He served as the deputy chairman of the Supreme Soviet's Commission on Education, Culture, and Preservation of Historical Heritage, and was also a member of the Supreme Soviet's Commission on International and External Economic Relations.

Trusaŭ participated in drafting and adopting the Declaration of State Sovereignty of Belarus and in preparing legislative projects during the extraordinary session of the Supreme Soviet from 24 to 25 August 1991, which declared Belarus' independence. He co-authored the Concept for the Transition of the Belarusian SSR to a Market Economy (autumn 1990) and several legislative projects in culture and education. Trusaŭ was one of the contributors to the official design of the Pahonia coat of arms and the white-red-white flag, the new state symbols of Belarus.

In the latter half of 1994, after President Alexander Lukashenko came to power, Trusaŭ became one of his most active critics, accusing him of attempting to establish a dictatorship. Trusaŭ participated in the hunger strike by BNF Opposition deputies from 11 to 12 April 1995 in the Oval Hall of the parliament, protesting the president's referendum on making Russian the second state language, changing Belarus' state symbols (the white-red-white flag and the Pahonia coat of arms) to Soviet-style symbols (the current national emblem and flag of Belarus), economic integration with Russia, and the president's right to dissolve parliament. On the night between April 11 and 12, he and other protesters were forcibly removed from the parliament hall by masked military and special service personnel, beaten, loaded into a car, driven away, and then dumped on the street in central Minsk. From 13 to 14 April 1995, Trusaŭ participated in a Constitutional Court trial where the BNF Opposition accused President Lukashenko of monopolizing mass media.

In 2010, Zianon Pazniak described Aleh Trusaŭ from the early 1990s in his memoirs:

A characteristic feature of his personality was optimism. Aleh knew how to remain calm and convincing in the sharpest parliamentary debates, never getting lost or agitated like some communists, maintaining a clear mind and avoiding panic where there was real danger... he was always an active defender of the Belarusian language.

During the 1995 Belarusian parliamentary election, Trusaŭ ran again for deputy. He repeatedly gained voter support, advancing to the second round, but each time, the second round was disrupted by the executive power. Ultimately, he did not make it to the Supreme Soviet, thus ending his parliamentary career.

=== Belarusian Social Democratic Assembly ===
In the summer of 1990, Aleh Trusaŭ announced his resignation from the Communist Party at the Supreme Soviet. Together with Michaś Tkačoŭ, he initiated the creation of a new social democratic party oriented towards Belarusian national revival. He joined the Organizing Committee of the Belarusian Social Democratic Assembly. The new party was registered in March 1991. At the Founding Congress, Trusaŭ was elected as the first deputy chairman of the Belarusian Social Democratic Assembly Central Council, and in 1992, he became its chairman. In the 12th Supreme Soviet, the Belarusian Social Democratic Assembly was the only political party to form its own parliamentary faction consisting of 15 deputies (the BPF Party movement also had a faction but was a social organization, not a party). In the 1994 Belarusian presidential election, the Belarusian Social Democratic Assembly supported Stanislav Shushkevich, and Trusaŭ led his campaign team.

In the parliamentary elections at the turn of 1995 and 1996, the Belarusian Social Democratic Assembly, like other democratic groups, faced defeat. This led to an internal party crisis. The left-wing faction criticized Trusaŭ for being too close to the BPF Party and the national-democratic camp. In July 1995, an extraordinary party congress narrowly voted Trusaŭ out as chairman. The new party leadership moved the Belarusian Social Democratic Assembly leftwards and prepared to unite with the parties of Siachka, Pashkevich, and Yarmalitsky. Trusaŭ and his supporters opposed this policy and soon formed a faction within the Belarusian Social Democratic Assembly aiming to maintain the party's independence. In May 1995, Trusaŭ's faction supported the initiative of a "round table of Belarusian political parties" to remove President Alexander Lukashenko from office. In October of the same year, they actively participated in preparing and holding the Congress in Defense of the Constitution.

In 1996, the left-wing Belarusian Social Democratic Assembly leadership decided to merge the party with the People's Concord Party, creating the Belarusian Social Democratic Party (People's Assembly). In January 1997, at the request of the party's leadership, the Belarusian Social Democratic Assembly was dissolved. Soon after, Aleh Trusaŭ initiated its revival. An Organizing Committee for the new Belarusian Social Democratic Assembly was formed, chaired by Stanislau Shushkevich. On 15 February 1998, at the Founding Congress of the revived Belarusian Social Democratic Assembly, Trusaŭ was elected deputy chairman of the party (Shushkevich was elected chairman).

=== Other activities ===
Since 1995, Aleh Trusaŭ has been an associate professor at the Belarusian University of Culture. From 1996, he worked as the dean of the Faculty of Library and Information Systems at this university. In March 1998, he left the position; some sources suggest he was forced out for political reasons. In 2007, he was an associate professor in the Department of History of Belarus and Museum Studies.

Trusaŭ participates in many initiatives and social organizations. In June 1997, he became deputy chairman of the Republican Council of the Francišak Skaryna Belarusian Language Society, and since April 1999, he has been its chairman. He also heads the Belarus-Germany Society and has long been a member of the Council of the Association of Belarusians of the World Batskaushchyna. He is part of the editorial boards of the newspaper Nasha Slova and the magazine Belarusian Antiquity.

== Views ==
During the late 1980s and early 1990s, Aleh Trusaŭ was a proponent of dissolving the Soviet Union and achieving Belarusian independence. He supported a national, cultural, and linguistic revival for the Belarusian nation. Trusaŭ believed this should be done gradually through evolutionary changes within the Communist Party. He argued that democratic-minded party activists could transform the party into a social-democratic entity and lead the Soviet republics to independence, democratization, and national identity restoration. Trusaŭ cited the Lithuanian communists from Sąjūdis, Russian politicians from the Communist Party's Democratic Platform, some founders of the Belarusian BPF Party, and Belarusian and Lithuanian academic circles with national-oriented party members as examples. He described this ideology as "national communism".

National communism is the gradual path to the dissolution of the Soviet Union and the independence of our country.

Trusaŭ also considered the communist officials of the Belarusian SSR from the 1920s and 1930s as national communists dreaming of an independent Belarus. He believed they created and preserved the Belarusian SSR, twice enlarged its territory, and initiated Belarusianization, for which they were later executed during the Great Purge.

Trusaŭ expressed the view that one of the biggest mistakes of the Belarusian Popular Front was the decision by some members to transform the organization into a political party – the BPF Party. He argued that a social movement, which could include people from various political groups and non-partisan individuals, was more effective. This decision led to divisions within the BPF Opposition and its fragmentation into many quarreling factions. The most significant consequence was the lack of agreement on a common presidential candidate. The Belarusian Social Democratic Assembly and the Democratic Club supported Stanislau Shushkevich, while the BPF Party nominated its leader, Zianon Pazniak. Trusaŭ believed that Vasil Bykaŭ would have been the ideal common candidate, but the lack of unity led to the democratic camp's defeat and Alexander Lukashenko's rise to power.

Despite the majority of Belarusians speaking Russian today, Aleh Trusaŭ remains optimistic about the future of the Belarusian language. He cites the 1999 census, where 74% of residents declared Belarusian as their native language, and the frequent choice of this language in school exams. He attributes the decline in Belarusian-language schools to rural depopulation, but notes that the language has recently become more urban and elite. Trusaŭ believes that cities determine the country's fate and argues that if the president's attitude towards the Belarusian language changes, state administration will start using it within six months, and the entire society within 2 or 3 years.

Trusaŭ advocates for reforming the Belarusian language by replacing Russian-derived words with Belarusian equivalents. He also supports reintroducing soft signs that were part of Belarusian orthography before Soviet-era reforms to add softness to words, resulting in a more pleasant-sounding language. However, he notes that these changes are unlikely to occur for another 20 years. Trusaŭ is skeptical of the early 20th-century spelling, known as taraškievica, used by some Belarusian-language communities today, considering it a form of showing off by the youth.

== Personal life ==
Aleh Trusaŭ is married and has a daughter.

== Bibliography ==
- Pazniak, Zianon (2010). "Зянон Пазьняк: Дэпутаты незалежнасьці (замест прадмовы); Слова пра калег і сяброў". In Navumchyk, Siarhei; Pazniak, Zianon (eds.). Дэпутаты незалежнасьці (in Belarusian). New York, Vilnius, Warsaw: Society of Belarusian Culture in Lithuania. ISBN 978-9955-578-11-6.
