= Vasily Tyorkin =

Poem by Aleksandr Tvardovsky, 1942–1945

Vasily Tyorkin. A Book About a Soldier
- by Aleksandr Tvardovsky
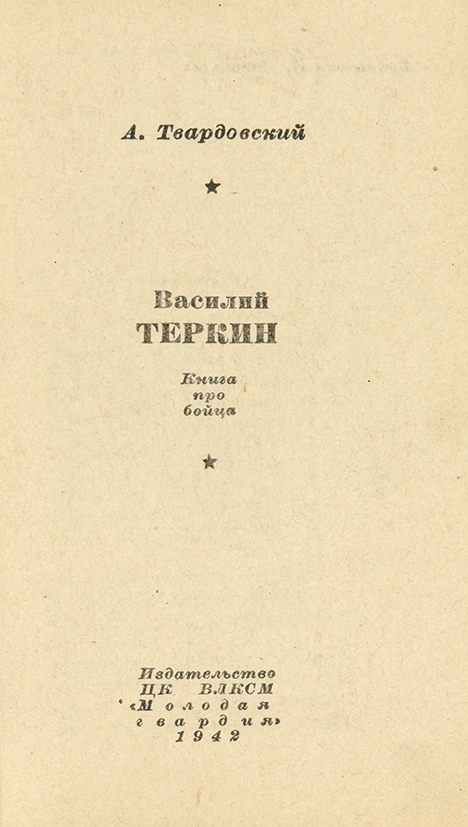
- Cover of the first edition, 1942
- Written: 1942—1945
- Country: Soviet Union
- Language: Russian

Vasily Tyorkin. A Book About a Soldier (Russian: Василий Тёркин. Книга про бойца) is a poem by Aleksandr Tvardovsky, one of the key works in the poet's oeuvre that has gained widespread recognition. The poem describes the life and wartime service of the fictional character Vasily Tyorkin, a Soviet soldier during the Second World War.

The poem began to be published serially in newspapers starting in 1942 and was completed in 1945. The first separate edition of the still unfinished work was published in 1942. The poem is mostly written in trochaic tetrameter, with some chapters in trochaic trimeter.

According to a sociological survey conducted in 2015 by the magazine "Russian Reporter", the text of the poem ranked 28th in the top 100 most popular poetic lines in Russia, which includes both Russian and world classics.

== Development of the poem ==
=== Development of the poem and character ===
The 1941 animated short film How Vasya Terkin went to be called up, released by Lenfilm

Tvardovsky began working on the poem and the central character during 1939-1940, while serving as a correspondent for the newspaper "On Guard of the Motherland" during the Winter War with Finland. The name and image of the protagonist were conceived through a collaborative effort among the editorial board members: artists Veniamin Briskin and Fomichev, and poets including N. Shcherbakov, Nikolai Tikhonov, Tsezar Solodar, and Samuil Marshak. The resulting portrayal of a simple, strong, and good-natured Russian lad was considered successful by Tvardovsky. Terkin emerged as a satirical hero in short poetic feuilletons written for the newspaper. In 1940, the collective published a brochure titled "Vasya Terkin at the Front," which was often given to soldiers as a form of recognition.

The coincidence between the main character's name and that of the protagonist from Pyotr Boborykin's eponymous novel of 1892 was purely accidental. Red Army soldier Terkin had already begun to gain some popularity among readers of the district newspaper, leading Tvardovsky to believe that the theme had potential and should be developed into a larger work.

=== Literary activity in 1940-1945 ===
In the spring of 1942, Tvardovsky returned to Moscow. Gathering scattered notes and drafts, he resumed work on the poem. "War is serious, and poetry must be serious", he wrote in his diary. On September 4, 1942, the first chapters of the poem ("Author's Preface" and "At Rest") were published in the newspaper Krasnoarmeyskaya Pravda. The poem gained prominence, with excerpts reprinted in major publications such as Pravda, Izvestia, and Znamya. Excerpts were also read over the radio by Dmitry Orlov and Yuri Levitan. Around this time, well-known illustrations by artist Orest Vereisky began to appear.

=== Reception and challenges ===
The work enjoyed considerable success with readers. When Tvardovsky intended to conclude the poem in 1943, he received numerous letters demanding its continuation. Between 1942 and 1943, the poet experienced a severe creative crisis. While audience warmly welcomed "A Book About a Soldier", party leadership criticized it for its pessimism and lack of references to the party's guiding role. The secretary of the USSR Writers' Union, Alexander Fadeyev, admitted: "the poem speaks to his heart", but "one must follow not the heart's inclinations but party directives". Nevertheless, Tvardovsky continued his work, reluctantly agreeing to censorship edits and cuts. Ultimately, the poem was completed in 1945. The final chapter ("In the Bathhouse") was finished in March 1945. Even before completing the work, Tvardovsky was awarded the Stalin Prize.

=== Subsequent works and controversies ===
While finishing the poem in 1944, Tvardovsky simultaneously began another poem, "Tyorkin on the Other Side" Initially planned as the final chapter of the original poem, the concept expanded into an independent work, incorporating some censored excerpts from "Vasily Terkin." "Terkin on the Other Side" was prepared for publication in the mid-1950s and became another significant work by Tvardovsky—a vivid anti-Stalinist pamphlet. On July 23, 1954, the Secretariat of the Central Committee, chaired by Nikita Khrushchev, issued a resolution condemning Tvardovsky for the prepared publication of "Terkin on the Other Side." During the campaign to "expose Stalin", the poem was first published in the newspaper Izvestia on August 17, 1963.

== Criticism and artistic features ==
The poem is introduced by an authorial preface that establishes its overall tone. Although it lacks a conventional plot, the narrative revolves around the central theme of the military road, along which Terkin and the entire Soviet army advance toward their objective. Many critics regard the chapter "The Crossing" as pivotal. The poem opens with a clear continuity from Tvardovsky's earlier utopian work, "Murmavia", which similarly begins with a journey undertaken by the protagonist. Authorial digressions play a significant role within the narrative, contributing to a unique dialogue between the author and the main character, which forms a substantial part of the text.

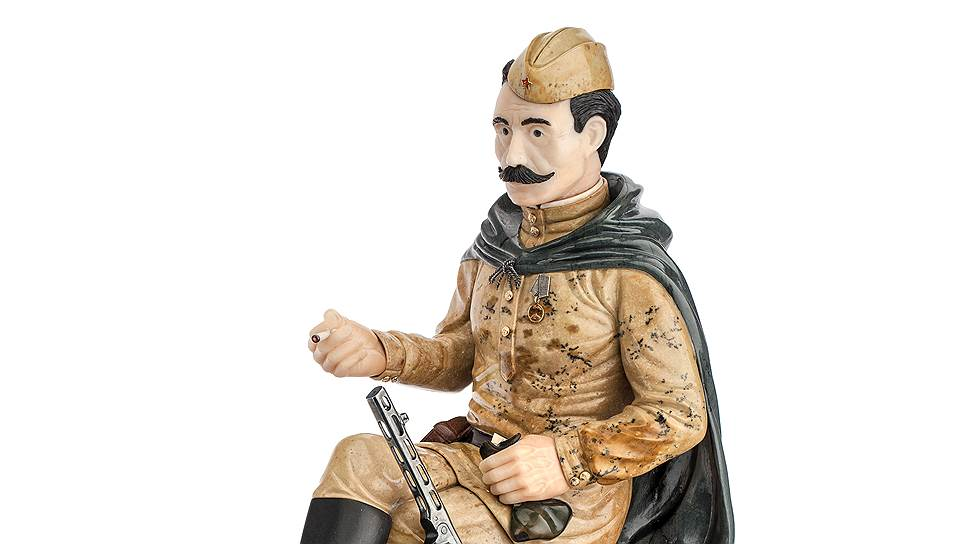
Figure of Vasily Tyorkin by Moiseikin Jewellery House

In the poem, Terkin embodies such human qualities as bravery, bravery and honor. The surrounding characters are nameless and abstract: fellow soldiers, a general, an elderly couple, Death—evocative figures reminiscent of folk tales. Despite its apparent simplicity, the language of the poem exemplifies the poet's distinctive style, drawing heavily on the richness of colloquial speech. The text abounds with phrases that echo proverbs and lines from folk songs ("It's good when someone lies merrily and skillfully", "A fine fellow, and if you have two—two ends indeed...").

The selection of four-footed choree as the poem's meter is purposeful, aligning well with the narrative rhythm and reflecting the metrical structure characteristic of Russian folk songs. Critics also observe that "Vasily Terkin" clearly reflects influences from Russian folktales, notably Pyotr Yershov's The Little Humpbacked Horse.

== Cultural significance ==
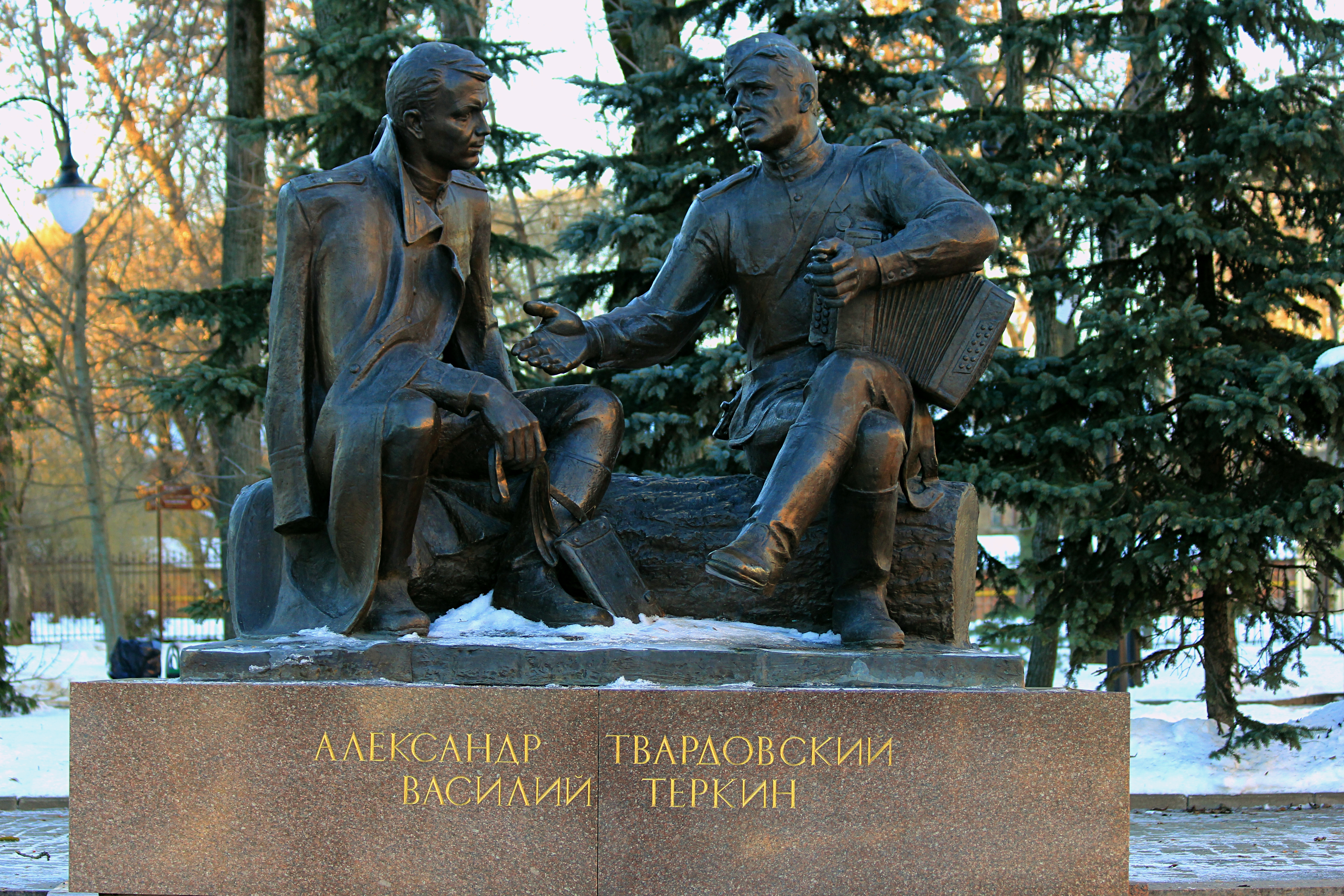
Monument to Tvardovsky and Tyorkin in Smolensk

The poem "Vasily Terkin" is one of the most renowned works created during the 1940s, showing the heroism and bravery of people. The poem was published in large editions, translated into many languages, and included in the school curriculum of both the USSR and Russia, making it familiar to virtually every schoolchild.

Tvardovsky, who himself experienced the frontlines, infused the language of the poem with sharp and precise observations, phrases, and sayings drawn from soldiers' experiences. Phrases from the poem became winged words and entered everyday speech.
