= Respublikanskaya Stroitel'naya Gazeta =

Respublikanskaâ stroitelʹnaâ gazeta
- Native name: Республиканская строительная газета
- Format: A3
- Language: Russian
- City: Minsk
- Country: Belarus
- Circulation: 1000
- Sister newspapers: Архитектура и строительство (Architecture and Construction Magazine)
- ISSN: 1991-3419
- Website: smp.by/o-nas/nashi-izdanija/respublikanskaja-stroitelnaja-gazeta/

Respublikanskaya Stroitel'naya Gazeta (Russian: Республиканская строительная газета) is a Russian language newspaper published in Minsk, Belarus by the state enterprise "StroyMediaProekt".
