= Gomelskaya Pravda =

Russian-language newspaper in Belarus

- Language: Russian
- Website: gp.by

Gomelskaya Pravda is a Russian-language newspaper published in Belarus.
