= Nedvizhimost Belorussii =

Belarusian Russian-language newspaper

- Language: Russian
- Website: nb.by

Nedvizhimost Belorussii is a Russian language newspaper published in Belarus.
