= Novy Chas =

Belarusian-language weekly newspaper

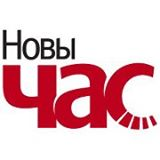
- Type: Weekly newspaper
- Publisher: Frantsishak Skaryna Belarusian Language Society
- Founded: March 2007; 19 years ago
- Political alignment: Independent liberal
- Language: Belarusian
- Headquarters: Minsk
- Sister newspapers: Nasha Slova
- ISSN: 2218-2144
- Website: novychas.online

Novy Chas (Belarusian: Новы Час [ˈnovɨ t͡ʂas]; New Time in English) is an independent weekly newspaper published in Belarus.

== History and profile ==
Novy Chas was established on 1 March 2007 as a successor to Zgoda which was shut down in 2007. The publisher is the Frantsishak Skaryna Belarusian Language Society. The society also publishes Nasha Slova newspaper and youth magazine Verasen. Novy Chas which published weekly is headquartered in Minsk and has an independent and liberal political leaning.

In June 2009, Novy Chas is the recipient of the Zeit prize awarded by Zeit-Stiftung Ebelin und Gerd Bucerius, a German foundation. As of 2010 Alyaksey Karol was the editor-in-chief of the paper.

In June 2021, Belposhta refused to distribute the newspaper by subscription. In August 2021, Novy Chas announced that it was forced to cease issuing printed newspapers due to refusal of all companies to print it.

On July 31, 2023, the European Parliament passed a resolution in which it asks the European Commission and the Member States, to strengthen Belarusian media outlets, including Novy Chas.

In January 2024, it became known that the website and Internet pages of Novy Chas were added to the list of the extremist materials in Belarus. Earlier in 2023, the newspaper's Telegram channel, its Odnoklassniki group, Instagram page and TikTok account were declared extremist.

In 2026, the Belarusian authorities declared the newspaper an extremist group.

== Incidents ==
Shortly after its start Novy Chas was closed down and resumed publication on 25 May 2007. The paper was warned by the Belarus authorities at the end of 2007. In June 2010, the paper was also warned by the information ministry due to the absence of the editor in chief's patronymic and the bar code from the imprint of the newspaper. In addition, it was barred from the state distribution network.

On March 12, 2021, Dzyanis Ivashin, journalist of the publication who was the author of the series of articles "Whom or What Protects the Berkut in Belarus" and the day before his arrest gave an interview to Current Time TV, in which he opened up on the results of his journalistic investigation, was arrested in a criminal case for interfering with the activities of the Militsiya.

== See also ==
- List of newspapers in Belarus
