= Zheleznodorozhnik Belorussii =

Newspaper from Belarus

- Language: Russian
- Website: xpress.by

Zheleznodorozhnik Belorussii is a Russian language newspaper published in Belarus.
