= Pyotr Boborykin =

Russian writer and journalist (1836–1921)

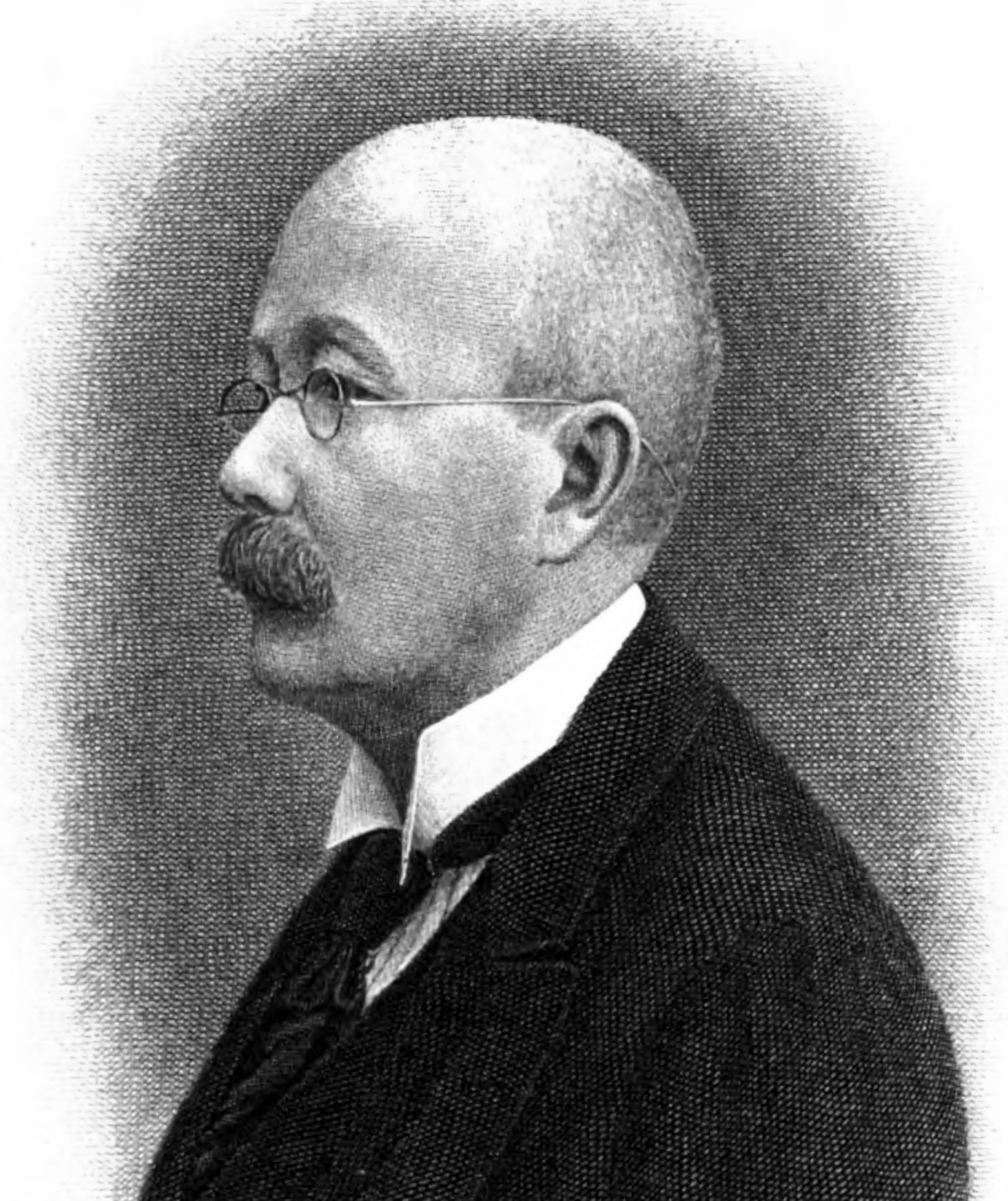
- Born: 15 August 1836; Nizhny Novgorod, Nizhegorodsky Uyezd, Nizhny Novgorod Governorate, Russian Empire
- Died: 12 August 1921 (aged 84); Lugano, Switzerland

Signature
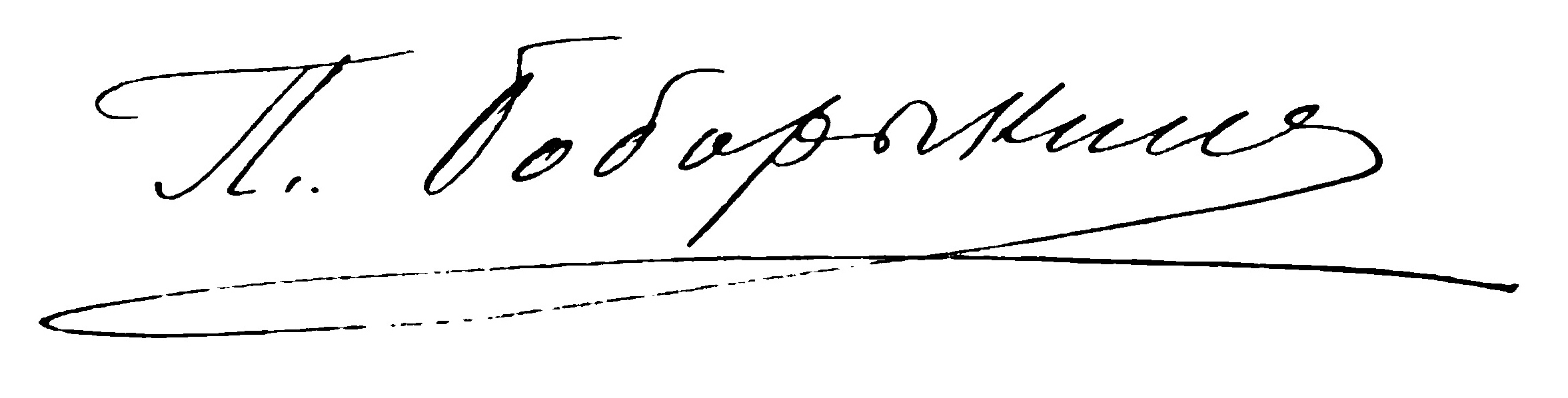

Pyotr Dmitriyevich Boborykin (Russian: Пётр Дми́триевич Боборы́кин; 27 August [O.S. 15 August] 1836 – 12 August 1921) was a Russian writer, playwright, and journalist.

== Biography ==
Boborykin was born into the family of a landowner. He studied at Kazan State University and the Dorpat University, but he never completed his education. He made his debut as a playwright in 1860. In 1863–1864 he published an autobiographical novel, The Pathway. He was the editor-publisher of the journal Library for Reading (1863–1865), worked for the theatre magazine Russian Stage, and was "Paris correspondent of several Russian newspapers". He spent a long period abroad in the 1890s, where he met Émile Zola, Edmond de Goncourt and Alphonse Daudet. In 1900 he was elected an honorary member of the Russian Academy of Sciences.

He married Sophia Zborzhevskaya or Zborzewska (1845-1925), an actress and translator, in 1872. He died in 1921, in Switzerland.

== Works ==
Boborykin worked on the journals Notes of the Fatherland, The European Herald, The Northern Herald, Russian Thought, Artist and other publications. He was the author of numerous novels, novellas, short stories, plays, and works on the history of Western European and Russian literature. His most famous works were the novels Evening Sacrifice (1868), Dealers (1872–1873), Half a Life (1873), Kitay-Gorod (1882), Vasily Tyorkin (1892), Thirst (1898), the story Wiser (1890), and the comedy The Scale (1899). His great volume of writing was mocked by his peers; "Few writers have taken themselves more seriously, yet few have attracted more ridicule and ribaldry from their contemporaries."

The wide use of the term "intelligentsia" in Russian culture began in the 1860s, when Boborykin first used it in the press. He explained that the term was borrowed from German culture, where it was used to describe the part of society which is engaged in intellectual activity. He added a special meaning to the term: the definition of intellectuals as representatives of "high intellectual and ethical culture," and not simply "knowledge workers". In his view, the Russian intelligentsia was a special moral and ethical phenomenon. Intellectuals in this sense were representatives of different professional groups, different political beliefs, but with a common spiritual and moral foundation. The use of the term "intelligentsia" in this sense was regarded as purely Russian by westerners.

The novel Kitay-Gorod was one of Boborykin's most famous works. It was originally conceived as a study on the life and mores of the inhabitants of Kitay-gorod. This work is interesting not only from an artistic, but also from a historical point of view. In the novel, he describes with almost scientific precision the details of merchant life; culinary preferences, daily duties, and the customs of merchants and nobles against the backdrop of anticipated social and political change. His main task is the treatment of the historical role of Moscow in the last third of the nineteenth century.
