= Belorusskaya Lesnaya Gazeta =

- Language: Russian
- Website: lesgazeta.by

Belorusskaya Lesnaya Gazeta is a Russian language newspaper published in Belarus. It appears in the United States as an archived news version.
