= Bobruyskiy Kurier =

- Language: Russian
- Website: babruysk.by

Bobruyskiy Kurier is a Russian language newspaper published in Belarus.
