= Minskiy Kurier =

- Language: Russian
- Website: mk.by

Minskiy Kurier is a Russian language newspaper published in Belarus.
