= Infa-Kurjer =

Belarusian newspaper

- Founded: 2001
- Ceased publication: 2023
- Language: Russian, Belarusian
- Headquarters: Slutsk
- Website: kurjer.info

Infa-Kurjer (Belarusian: Інфа-кур'ер) was a newspaper published in Belarus (partially in Russian, partially in Belarusian).

On April 8, 2023, Infa-Kurjer announced the suspension of its activities. The day before, all the content of the project (newspaper, website and social networks) was recognized as "extremist materials" in Belarus.
