= Narodnya Naviny Vitsebska =

Daily news website in Belarus

- Language: Belarusian, Russian
- Website: viciebsk.cc

Narodnya Naviny Vitsebska (Belarusian: Народныя навіны Віцебска, romanized: Narodnyja naviny Viciebska, Russian: Народные новости Витебска, romanized: Narodnye novosti Vitebska, lit. 'People's news of Vitebsk') is a non-governmental news website in Belarus. The main editor is photographer Syarzhuk Serabro. The website is working at least since 2006, and is updated daily.
