= 7 Dney =

Newspaper published in Belarus

- Publisher: Ministry of Information
- Language: Russian
- Website: 7 Dney

7 Dney is a Russian language newspaper published in Belarus. The paper is published by the ministry of information.
