= Armianskiy Vestnik =

Armianskiy Vestnik (Russian: Армянский Вестник) was an Armenian-Russian weekly published in Moscow, from 1916 - 1918, by A. Jivelegov and I. Amirov. It was re-published in the late 1990s.

It published information about the massacres and deportations of Armenians in Ottoman Turkey, news from the Caucasian front of World War I, articles about the Armenian Cause, Armenian-Russian relations, and literature. Valery Bryusov, Sergey Gorodetski, Vladimir Nemirovich-Danchenko, Yuri Veselovsky, Leo, Vahan Totomiants, and others contributed to the periodical.

== Sources ==
- Concise Armenian Encyclopedia, Ed. by acad. K. Khudaverdyan, Yerevan, 1990, Vol. 1, p. 397-398.
