= Hazeta Slonimskaya =

Belarusian newspaper

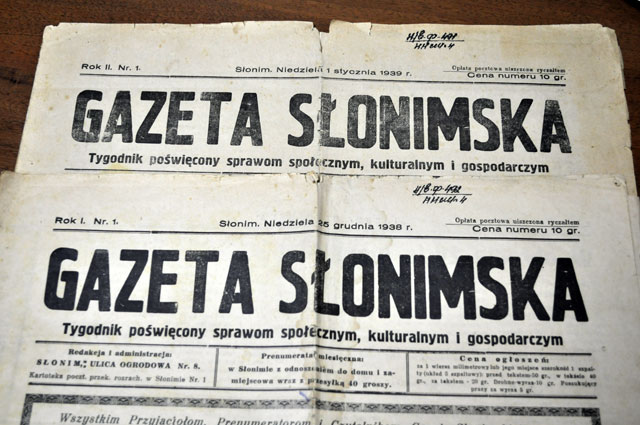
- Founder: Anna Volodarshchuk
- Founded: 1997
- Language: Bilingual (Belarusian and Russian)
- Headquarters: Slonim, Belarus
- Circulation: 7,000 to 8,000 copies
- Website: www.gs.by

Hazeta Slonimskaya (Belarusian: Газета Слонімская; Russian: Газета Слонимская; 7,000 to 8,000 copies) is an independent local Belarusian newspaper. It was published in Slonim, Belarus.

In November 2020, the publication was suspended by the Belarusian authorities for 6 months. As of June 2021, even after the suspension expired, no printing house agreed to print the circulation.

== History ==
The oldest independent newspaper in Slonim was founded in 1938 by the well-known poet Sergei Novik-Pjajun and his wife Ludmila. The articles were written in Polish. Only four issues were published, then Nivik-Pjajun was arrested by the Polish government, the newspaper was closed. In 1997 ‘Slonimskaya’ was revived under chief editor Victor Volodashuck. Publication’s runs grew to 12500 copies per month, the staff included several journalists, marketing department, correctors, layout designer, etc. When Volodashuck died in 2019, his widow Anna took the post of chief editor.

In 2006 Belposhta and Belsouzpechat (the state press distributor) refused to prolong contracts with the publication and excluded it from their catalogues.

In 2008 Hazeta Slonimskaya received the Free Media Award from Die Zeit Foundation and an honorary certificate from Belarusian Association of Journalists. In the same year, before the next parliamentary elections’, Hazeta Slonimskaya experienced pressure from local authorities. It was threatened to be suspended by the district chef for selling copies not in a permitted place. Then the editors office without any explained reason received an eviction order from the state-controlled leaseholder company; all other agencies refused to deal with the publication.

In 2017 the newspaper returned to the state catalogue and could be sold via press stands again.

== Crackdown and Suspension ==
On November 9, 2020, the house of the founder of the newspaper Anna Volodarshchuk and the editorial office of Hazeta Slonimskaya were searched, computers and other storage media were taken away, and work was paralyzed. As a result of that, the November 11 issue of Hazeta Slonimskaya was not published for the first time in 23 years. Anna Volodarshchuk left Belarus due to the threat of criminal prosecution.

On November 18, 2020, Anna Volodarshchuk reported that it became impossible to publish the newspaper in conditions of violence, so Hazeta Slonimskaya suspended its publication for six months. In the assessment of the chairman of the Belarusian Association of Journalists Andrey Bastunets, the crackdown on Hazeta Slonimskaya confirms the pressure of the authorities on the regional press.

At the beginning of May 2021, a notification was sent to the Ministry of Information about the resumption of the newspaper's publication. On 24 May the ministry included it in the register of printed media. However, the newspaper could not be printed, as several printing houses refused to print the circulation.
