= Narodnaya Gazeta =

Newspaper in Minsk, Belarus

- Editor-in-chief: Igor Savostenko
- Language: Belarusian, Russian
- Website: www.sb.by/ng

Narodnaya Gazeta (Belarusian: Народная газета, "People's Newspaper") is a newspaper that started in 1990 in Minsk, Belarus.

== History ==
The newspaper was founded in 1990 as the national socio-political newspaper. Narodnaya Gazeta was the printing organ of the Supreme Council of Belarus. For the first time, the newspaper was published on October 2, 1990.

Throughout its history, the newspaper has been reporting on events from an independent point of view and has maintained democratic views.

In 1995, due to a conflict in the government that affected the media, the President of Belarus issued a decree to change the leadership of Narodnaya Gazeta. Iosif Syaredzich, the chief editor of Narodnaya Gazeta was dismissed for publishing the article called Letter to the President, which called for violence and civil strife according to the head of state.

On March 17, 1995, Alexander Lukashenko appointed Nikolai Galko, as the new editor-in-chief of Narodnaya Gazeta, by his decree. Iosif Siaredich created the new newspaper Narodnaya Volya on July 11, 1995.

== Present ==
Narodnaya Gazeta covers issues of social and political, international life, problems of the economy, culture, science, the activity of the bodies of legislative and executive power of the Republic of Belarus. Much attention is paid to issues of morality and law, human-society relations. It publishes legislative acts, information-political materials, on the issues of economy, education, culture and history of Belarus, ecology, social problems, sports. Widely uses letters from readers, freelance authors.

In 2014, the newspaper became a part of the Belarus Today Publishing House and start to be published not daily, but weekly.

== Editors-in-Chief ==
- Iosif Sredicevic (1990-1995)
- Nikolai Galko (1995-1996)
- Mikhail Shimansky (1996-2004)
- Vladimir Andreevich (2005-2014)
- Igor Savostenko (since 2014)
