= Holas Radzimy =

Newspaper published in Belarus

- Language: Belarusian

Holas Radzimy is a newspaper published in Belarus.
