= Meditsinskiy Vestnik =

- Language: Russian
- Website: medvestnik.by

Meditsinskiy Vestnik is a Russian language newspaper published in Belarus.
