= Vecherniy Brest =

Newspaper in Brest, Belarus

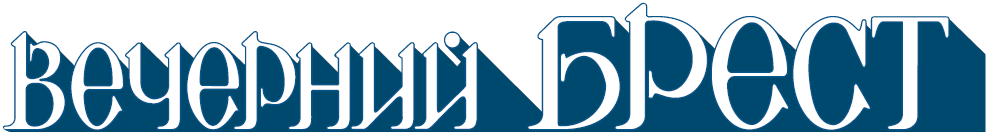

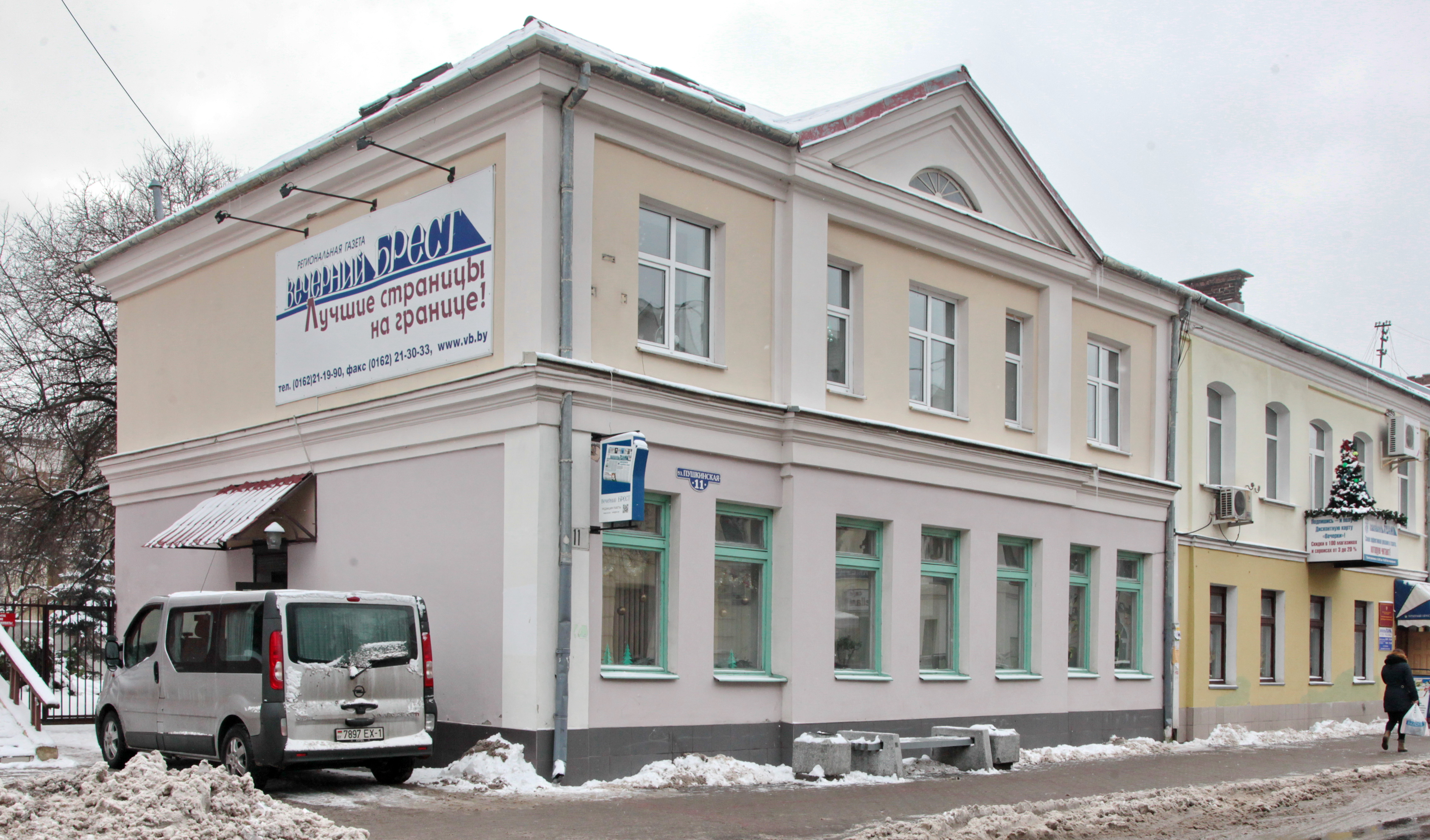
- Type: twice-weekly
- Publisher: Newspaper office "Vecherniy Brest" JSC
- Editor-in-chief: Mikhail Oleynik
- Founded: 1991; 34 years ago
- Language: Russian, Belarusian
- Headquarters: Brest, Belarus
- Circulation: 5,000 (January 2021)
- ISSN: 1819-9143
- Website: www.vb.by

Vecherniy Brest (Russian: Вечерний Брест, lit. 'Evening Brest') is a bilingual regional socio-political government-run weekly newspaper, published in Brest on Friday (circulation 5000 (January 2021)).

== Literature ==
- David Marples: 'Our Glorious Past': Lukashenka's Belarus and the Great Patriotic War, 2014, pp. 25, 42, 331, 340–342.
- Tatiana Repkova: New Times: Making a Professional Newspaper in an Emerging Democracy, 2001, pp. 74.
