= Belorusy i rynok =

Belarusian weekly business newspaper

Belorusy i rynok (Russian: Белорусы и рынок, pronounced [bʲɛləˈrusɨ ɪ ˈrʲnək]) is the main business weekly newspaper published in Belarus. The publication was banned by the Ministry of information of the Republic of Belarus on December 12, 2022.

The newspaper was founded in 1990 under the name Belorusskij rynok (Белорусский рынок, The Belarusian Market) and was one of the first private media in Belarus. In 2005 the newspaper had to change its name following a decree of president Lukashenka that forbid usage of the words National and Belarusian in names of organisations and newspapers.

The newspaper was published mainly in Russian language. For 25 years, until 2015, the newspaper was headed by Viačasłaŭ Chadasoŭski. Chadasoŭski was succeeded first by Valentina Vestort, and later by Andrei Aleksandrovich, a former journalist at Belorusskaya Delovaya Gazeta and one of the founders of the Ezhednevnik business newspaper.

In December 2022, Belorusy i rynok was banned by the Ministry of Information for "disseminating extremist materials" on its website, which were actually hyperlinks to some external sources also recognised as "extremist". The website continued to function.

In April 2023, the newspaper's director Konstantin Zolotykh, who had been arrested in May 2022, was sentenced to four years in prison. Aleksandrovich was declared a witness in the case, the KGB interrogated him and searched his home, seizing his computer. He was forced into exile in the late 2023. Alexandrovich died prematurely on 26 February 2024.
