= Zhodzinskiya Naviny =

Newspaper published in Zhodzina, Belarus

- Language: Bilingual
- Website: Жодзінскія Навіны

Zhodzinskiya Naviny (Жодзінскія Навіны; Zhodino News) is a newspaper published in Zhodzina, Belarus.
