= Vo Slavu Rodiny =

- Language: Russian

Vo Slavu Rodiny (formerly Krasnoarmeyskaya Pravda) is a Russian language newspaper published in Belarus. Formed in 1921 in USSR.

In September, 1942, the first publication of "Vasily Terkin" by Aleksandr Tvardovsky began in this newspaper.
