= Zvyazda =

Belarusian newspaper

Zvyazda Звязда

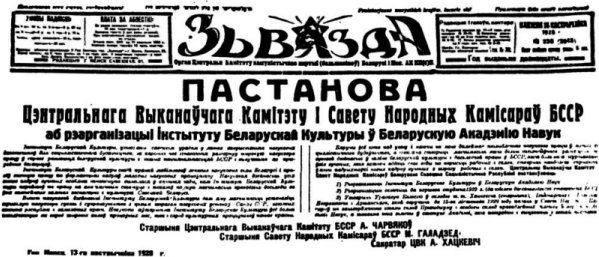
- Zvyazda in 1928
- Type: Daily newspaper
- Format: Broadsheet
- Editor-in-chief: Aliaksandr Karlyukevich
- Founded: 1917; 109 years ago
- Language: Belarusian
- Headquarters: Minsk, Belarus
- Website: www.zviazda.by

Zvyazda (Belarusian: Звязда, [zʲvʲaˈzda], lit. 'The Star') is a state-owned daily newspaper in Belarus.

== History and profile ==
Zvyazda was founded in 1917 as an organ of the Minsk Committee of Russian Social Democratic Labour Party (Bolsheviks).

Zvyazda was twice closed down by the Russian Provisional Government but continued being published under different names. At some periods of World War I and the Polish-Soviet war Zvyazda was printed in Smolensk. From 10 July 1944 Zvyazda has been published in Minsk. Until 1991 it was an official newspaper of the Communist Party of Belarus and the Communist parliament and government of Belarus. During the Soviet era, the paper received the Order of the Great Patriotic War and the Order of the Red Banner of Labour.

Since August 1927 the newspaper has been printed in Belarusian language only. It is the only daily newspaper published in the Belarusian language in the country.

During World War II remaining communist party members tried to publish the newspaper illegally on the territory of Nazi-occupied Belarus.

Zvyazda is owned by the Belarus government. In 2012 its print run was reduced to 30,000 copies.

In August 2020, during the first weeks of mass protests in Belarus, journalists of Zvyazda made joint statements calling to stop violence against protesters, stop harassment on journalists and state censorship. After a few days editor-in-chief Pavel Sukharukau was forced to resign and was replaced by the former minister of information Aliaksandr Karlyukevich.

== See also ==
- Eastern Bloc information dissemination
