= Francišak Skaryna Belarusian Language Society =

Belarusian language advocacy association

- Таварыства беларускай мовы імя Францішка Скарыны
- Abbreviation: TBM, BLS
- Formation: 1989
- Type: Language advocacy organization
- Legal status: Registered NGO (civic organization)
- Purpose: Advocacy of language rights; promotion of the Belarusian language and culture
- Headquarters: vul. Rumiancava, 13; Minsk
- Region served: Belarus
- Members: c. 7,000
- Head: Alena Anisim
- Main organ: Republican Council
- Website: http://tbm-mova.by/about_us.html

The Francišak Skaryna Belarusian Language Society (Belarusian: Таварыства беларускай мовы імя Францішка Скарыны, romanized: Tavarystva bielaruskaj movy imia Franciška Skaryny, TBM) is an association in Belarus. The association's main activity is advocacy and promotion of the Belarusian language.

== History and profile ==
The TBM was founded in 1989 on an initiative a group of Belarusian intellectuals by Belarusian Writers' Union, the Ministries of Education and of Culture, the Institutes of Linguistics and of Literature of the Belarus Academy of Sciences, the Belarusian Cultural Fund, the State Committee on the Press, the Belarusian Society of Friendship and Cultural Links with Foreign Countries, and the National State Television and Radio Company.

TBM has organized numerous campaigns of promotion of the Belarusian language, such as demands of introduction of Belarusian notifications in the public transport, description of goods in Belarusian on labels, promotion of primary and higher education in Belarusian language.

Although the organization opposes the official russification policy of Alexander Lukashenko and many notable opposition leaders and activists are members of the TBM, it stays away from politics and stays firmly within its declared goals.

In July 2021, Belarusian authorities conducted a search in the office of the society, and in August Ministry of justice applied for liquidation of this society in the Supreme Court of Belarus.

== Chairperson ==
- from 2017: Alena Anisim, Member of Parliament
- 1999 – 2017: Aleh Trusaŭ [also: Oleg Trusov], historian
- 1997 – 1999: Henadz Buraukin [also: Gennady Buravkin, Genadz Burawkin], poet
- 1989 – 1996: Nil Hilevich, poet
