= Freedom March (Belarus) =

1999 protest in Minsk, Belarus

- Part of the Belarusian democracy movement
- Date: 17 October 1999 c. 12:00 – 17:00
- Location: Minsk, Belarus
- Caused by: Impending ratification of the Union State; Enforced disappearances of Viktar Hanchar and Yury Zacharanka; Authoritarian rule of Alexander Lukashenko
- Goals: Ending the process of integration with Russia; Maintenance of Belarusian independence; Release of political prisoners; End to forced disappearances
- Methods: March
- Concessions: Belarusian independence maintained

Parties
(Belarus) Belarusian opposition: Young Front; Belarusian Social Democratic Party (People's Assembly)	Government of Belarus: Presidency of Belarus; (Belarus) Presidential Administration; Internal Troops; Ministry of Internal Affairs; Militsiya; State Security Committee

Lead figures
(Belarus) Ales Bialiatski; (Belarus) Vincuk Viačorka; (Belarus) Anatoly Lebedko; (Belarus) Mikola Statkevich	Alexander Lukashenko; (Belarus) Sergey Ling

Number
Over 30,000	Unknown

Casualties
- Injuries: 56 police and 100 protesters injured
- Arrested: 200

The Freedom March (Belarusian: Марш свабо́ды, romanized: Marš svabody) was a 1999 protest by the Belarusian opposition in the Belarusian capital of Minsk. The protest was caused as a result of fears of Belarus being annexed into Russia as part of the then-impending ratification of the Union State. Additional concerns of protesters were the enforced disappearances of opposition politicians Viktar Hanchar and Yury Zacharanka and, more broadly, the authoritarian rule of President Alexander Lukashenko. The protest, which ended in a violent confrontation between the city's police and protesters, resulted in the Belarusian government walking back plans for the Union State and the continued independence of Belarus from Russia.

== Background ==
Belarus gained independence in 1991, amid the backdrop of the 1991 Soviet coup d'état attempt and the broader dissolution of the Soviet Union. The export-oriented economy of Belarus remained economically tied to Russia following its independence, and, following Alexander Lukashenko being elected President in 1994, efforts to further integrate Belarus with Russia began. The Community of Belarus and Russia was formed in 1996, with further groundwork being laid for the unification of Belarus and Russia in 1997 and 1998.

The prospect of Belarus being annexed into Russia frightened the nascent Belarusian opposition, and in 1996 and 1997 the Minsk Spring (also referred to as the Belarusian Spring) protests occurred, but failed to halt the process of integration. By 1999, the treaty to form the Union State was close to being signed, with the support of Russian president Boris Yeltsin and oligarch Boris Berezovsky. Despite the support of Yeltsin and Berezovsky, Lukashenko was much more eager to pursue the union, due to what The Guardian referred to as Belarus' status as an "economic liability" for Russia.

Lukashenko's authoritarian rule was also a significant factor in the protests, specifically the enforced disappearances of opposition politicians Viktar Hanchar and Yury Zacharanka in the spring of 1999, as well as the imprisonment of other anti-Lukashenko activists. The non-binding, opposition-held 1999 Belarusian presidential election, which had resulted in the disappearances of Hanchar and Zacharanka, brought the government and opposition to the brink of confrontation.

== Protests ==
In September 1999, a coalition of seven young members of the opposition, among them Ales Bialiatski, Vincuk Viačorka, Anatoly Lebedko, and Mikola Statkevich, announced the Freedom March in Minsk, scheduled for a month and a half later. Lebedko wrote at the time, "One of the objectives of the march is to provide a voice in support of the negotiation process, real negotiation, because to this day, only an imitation of it has been occurring." The intention was to gather at Yakub Kolas Square and move to Independence Square along the city's Independence Avenue. However, the Minsk police refused to give their consent to the protest, instead demanding it be moved to the remote Bangalore Square.

On 17 October 1999, around noon, protesters began gathering at Yakub Kolas Square, where the police began making arrests. A black goat was brought to the march with the name of Lukashenko written on a sign tied to its horns, but was taken by OMON. In Yakub Kolas Square, there were about 15,000 protesters. By the time the procession had moved to Bangalore Square, the number of protesters numbered at around 30,000. There, a short rally was held before the column marched down Maksim Bahdanovič Street to the city's first ring, where an attempt was made to enter Victory Square.

However, as the entrance to Victory Square was guarded, it was instead determined to travel down May First Street. At the intersection of May First and Frunze Streets, a minor confrontation occurred when a riot policeman. fought with protesters, injuring one officer. However, the procession continued until it reached the bridge of May First Street on the Svislach River. There, they were stopped by cordon of riot police, who refused the let them through as Lukashenko's residence was across the river.

As the march moved away from the bridge, the riot police descended on them, attacking protesters with batons. In response, protesters threw stones, asphalt, and tiles from an embankment project. Combat only ended with the entrance of OMON, who detained around 200 protesters, including Statkevich. The protest ended around five hours after it began.

== Aftermath ==
The Belarusian government strongly criticised the protests and took aim at the western world for responsibility, with Mikhail Myasnikovich claiming, "The west's money doesn't get spent on medicines or on the victims of the Chernobyl accident, but on those who are fighting, smashing, demolishing and setting fires." The Belarusian Prosecutor General additionally threatened terms of up to five years for protesters for "grossly violating public order." Despite this, none of the arrested received anything beyond a fine.

Following the protests, the government of Belarus walked back its support for the Union State, stalling further negotiations for integration. When the Union State was agreed to in December 1999, it failed to produce any concrete steps towards unification, and Yeltsin's resignation and replacement by Vladimir Putin the same month effectively brought an end to concepts for the unification of Belarus and Russia. Since the Freedom March, the number of forcefully-disappeared individuals has also decreased.

The Freedom March was a monumental event both for the Belarusian government and opposition. For the government, it marked the last significant Belarusian protest until the Jeans Revolution of 2006. The violence between police and protesters additionally gave ammunition for a smear campaign against the opposition. For the opposition, it marked a transition from the pre-Lukashenko Belarusian Popular Front to a younger generation of dissidents, and led to an increase in sales for pro-opposition newspapers.

== Reactions ==
=== Governments ===
- The United States condemned the crackdown on the protests, with the United States Department of State calling for Belarus to "respect its international obligations and to investigate the behavior of its security forces yesterday and last night", as well as for the release of Statkevich. A resolution proposed by Sam Gejdenson condemning the Belarusian government, in part because of the crackdown on the Freedom March, additionally was approved by the United States Congress.

=== Non-governmental organisations ===
- Amnesty International referred to the detained protesters as prisoners of conscience, additionally noting reports of mistreatment by police of protesters.

== See also ==
- 1991 Belarusian strikes
- Minsk Spring
- Jeans Revolution
- 2010 Belarusian protests
- 2011 Belarusian protests
- 2017 Belarusian protests
- 2020–2021 Belarusian protests
