= 2019 Belarusian anti-Russian protests =

Belarusian protests against integration with Russia in 2019

2019 Belarusian protests
- Part of Belarusian opposition movement
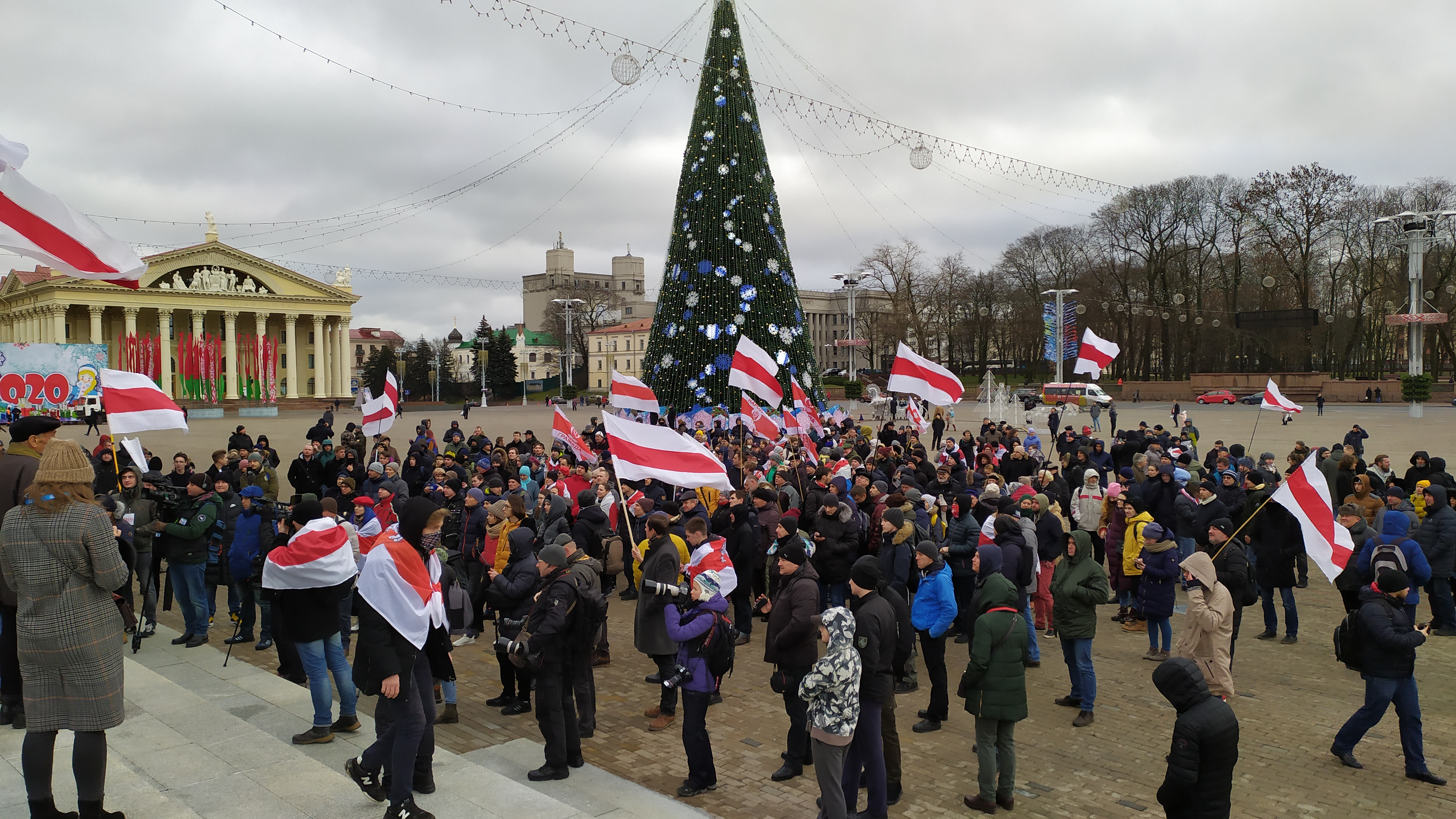
- Anti-Lukashenko protesters on 8 December in Minsk
- Date: December 7, 2019 – January 4, 2020
- Location: Minsk and Polotsk
- Caused by: Integration of Belarus with Russia by Alexander Lukashenko; Authoritarianism; Suppression of the Belarusian language
- Goals: Stop the Belarusian-Russian integration; Preserve Belarusian independence; Resignation of Alexander Lukashenko; Democratization
- Methods: Demonstrations, rallies
- Result: Protests evolved into the 2020-2021 election protests

Parties
(Belarus) Belarusian opposition: Young Front; Belarusian Christian Democracy; BPF Party; Supported by: Belsat TV	Government of Belarus: Internal Troops; Militsiya

Lead figures
(Belarus) Paval Sieviaryniec (Belarus) Vyacheslav Siuchyk (Belarus) Siarhiey Antončyk (Belarus) Sergei Tikhanovsky	Alexander Lukashenko (Belarus) Syarhey Rumas

Number
A few thousands	Unknown

Casualties
- Arrested: 13 demonstrators

The 2019 Belarusian protests were directed against the further integration into a Union State with Russia. Demonstrations were held in Minsk and Polotsk from 7 to 29 December 2019, however, last protests ended on 4 January 2020. They were led by Belarusian youth activist Paval Sieviaryniec.

== Background ==
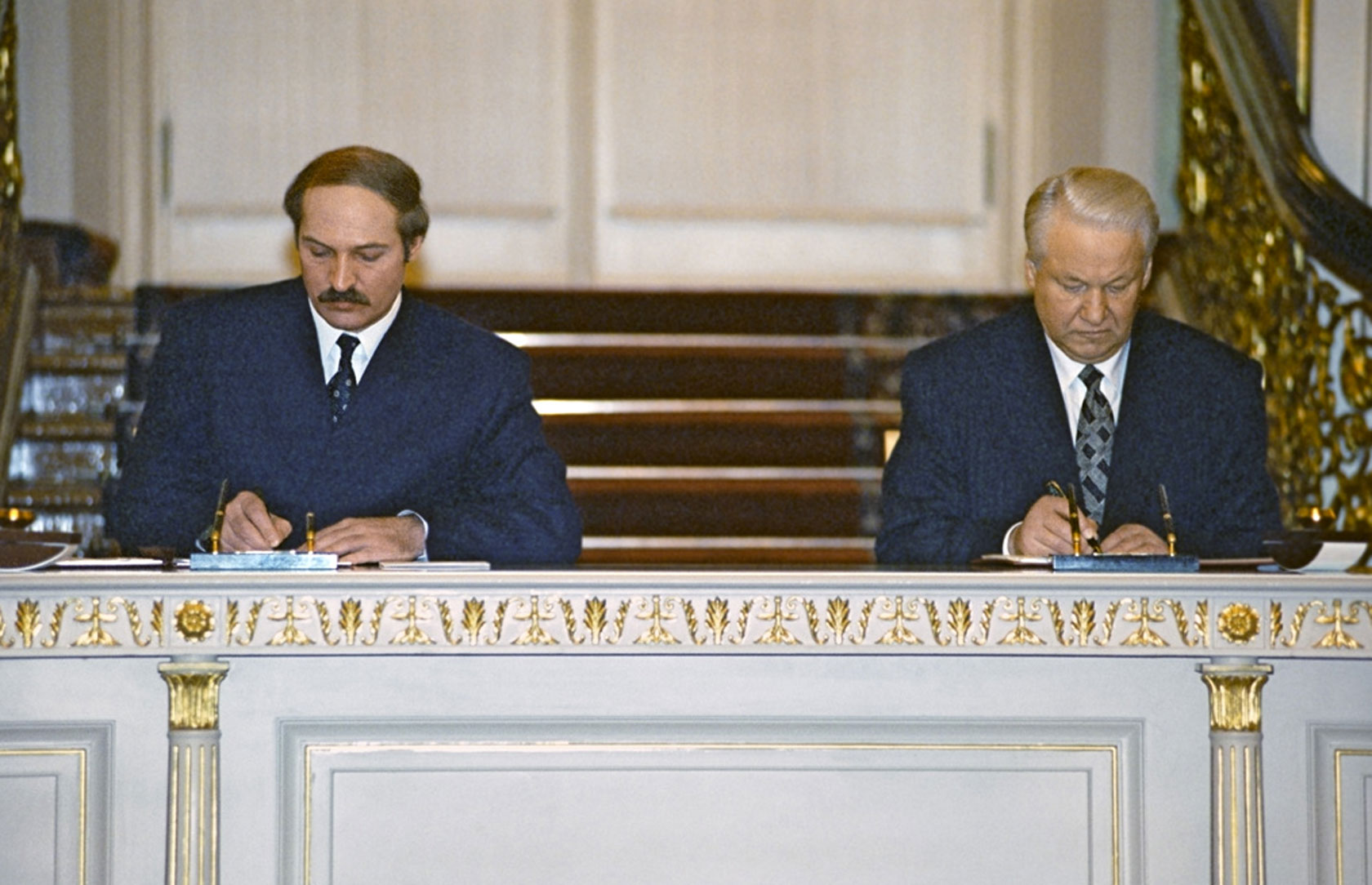
Lukashenko signing a Treaty on Establishing Russian-Belarusian Union with Russian President Boris Yeltsin on 7 April 1997

Since Alexander Lukashenko's rise to power in 1994, Belarus began to reinforce relations with Russia. One of the main decisions was to create a Union State on 7 April 1997 in Moscow with the then-President of Russia Boris Yeltsin. Those pro-Russian movement caused multiple protests by Belarusian nationalists and pro-democracy activists, with two Freedom Marches in 1999 and 2000, respectively. Other protests, like in 2006, 2010, 2011, and 2017, also had anti-Union State with Russia sentiment, which also sparked the 2019 protests.

== Protests ==
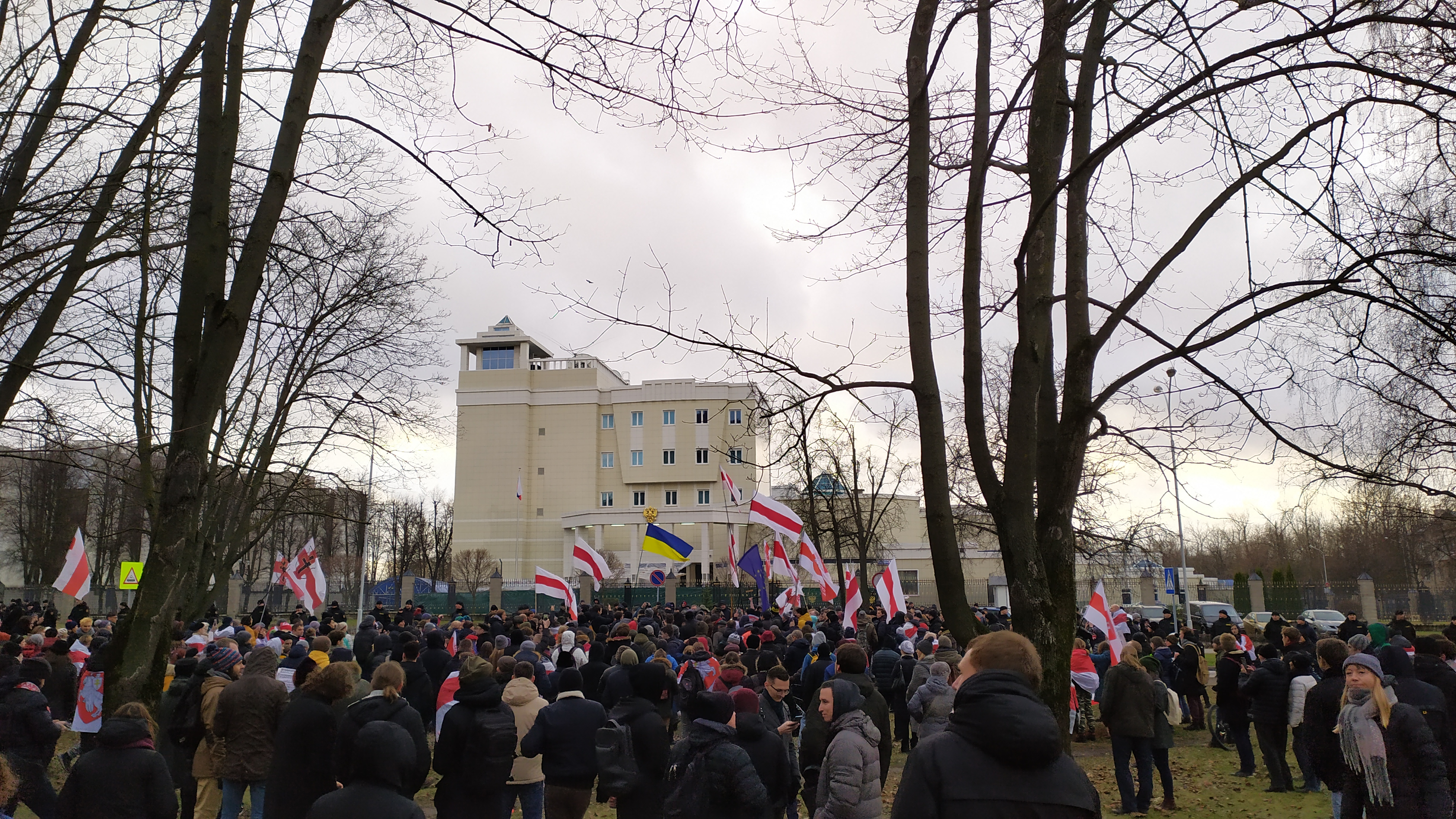
Protesters near the Russian embassy in Minsk.

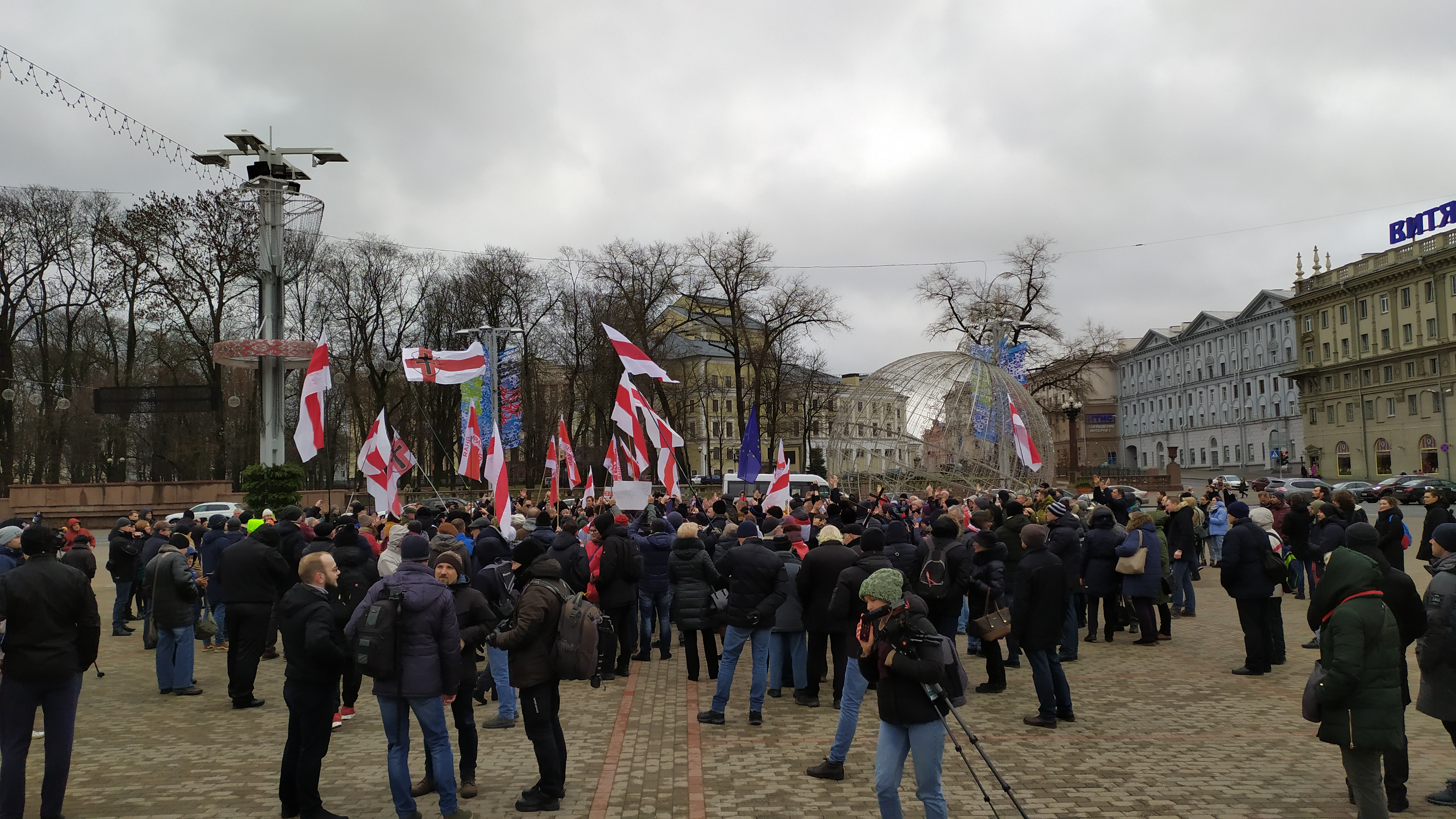
Anti-Lukashenko demonstration in Minsk organized by the Young Front and pro-EU supporters.

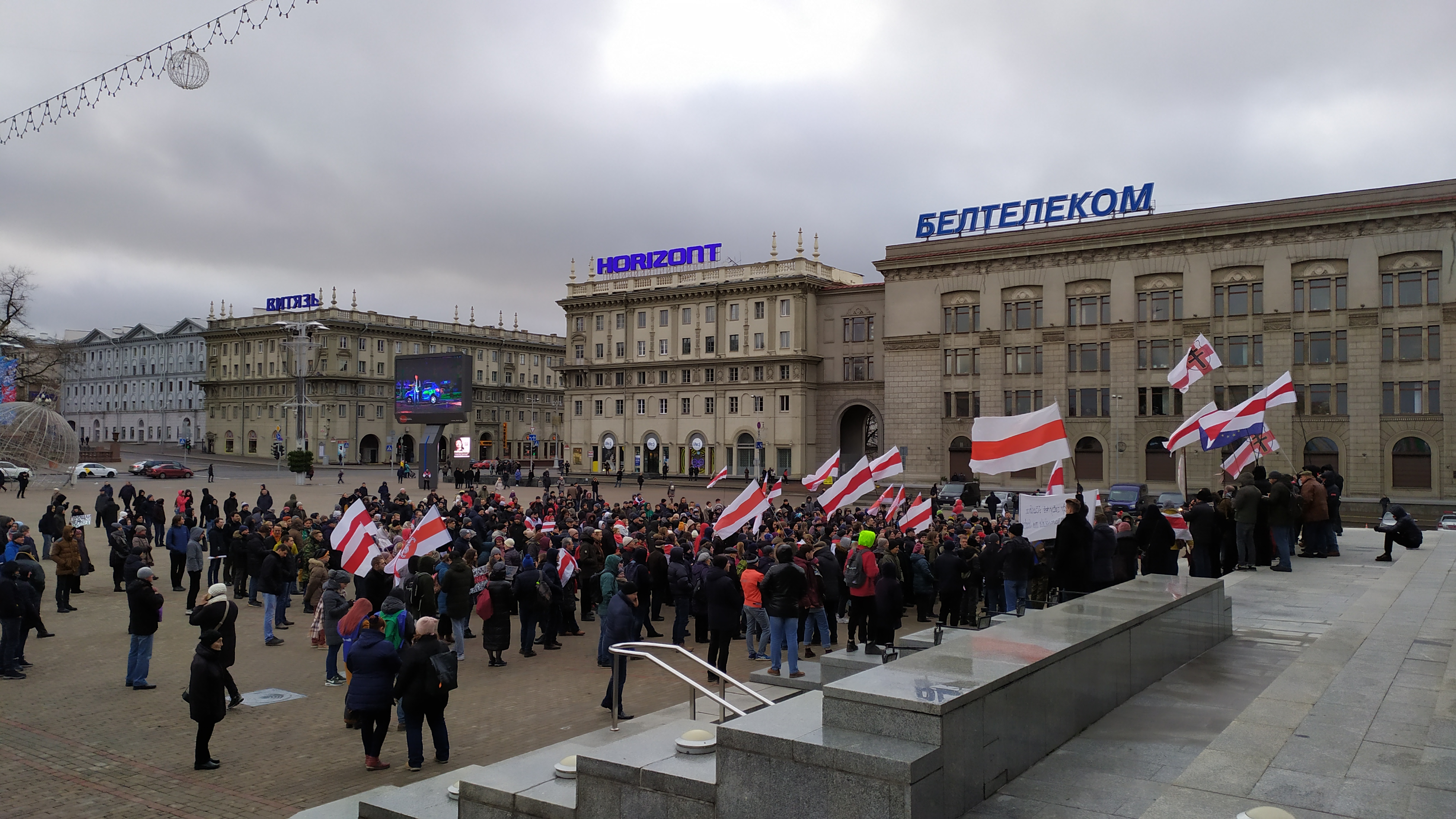
Other opposition protesters in Minsk.

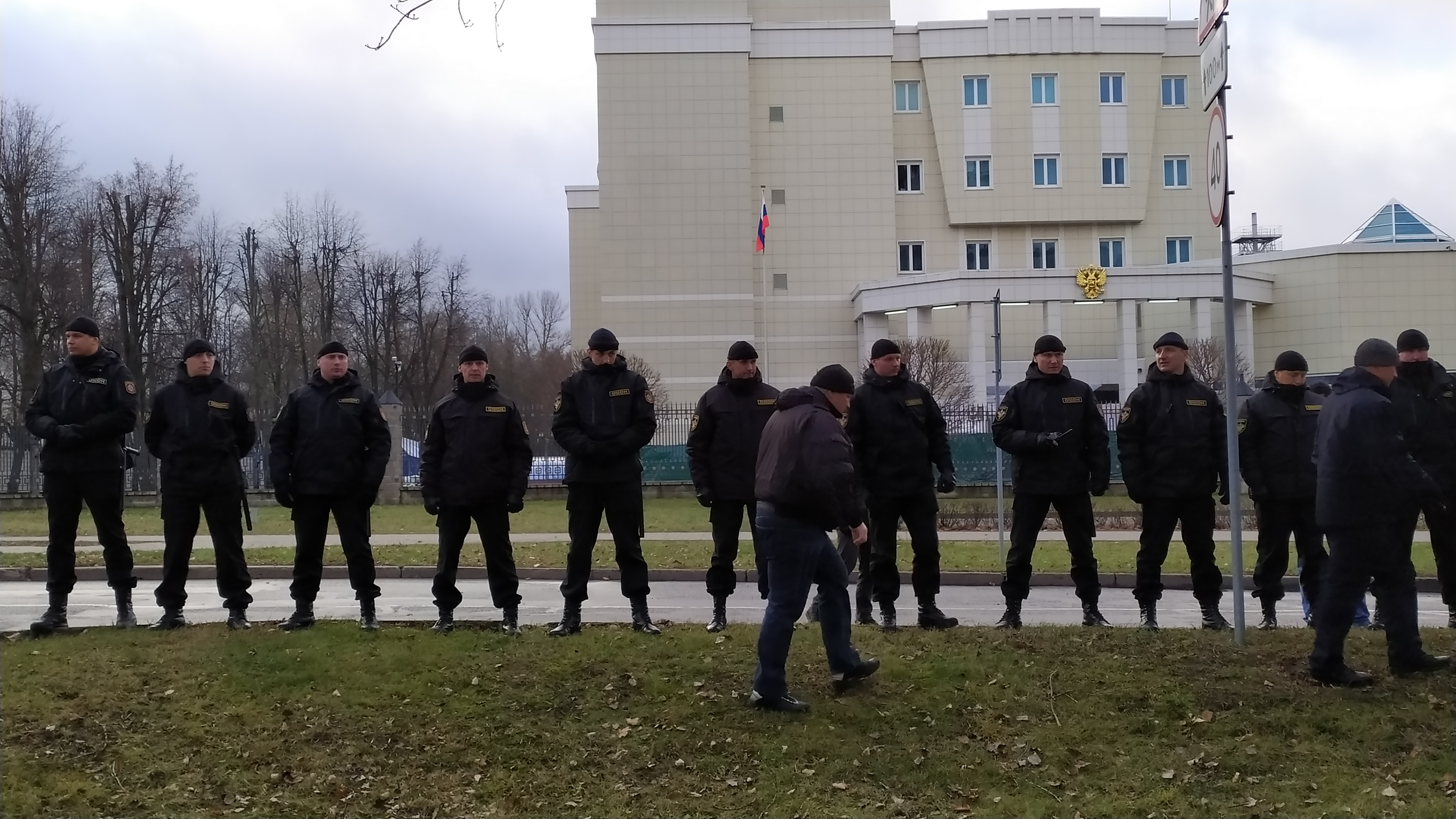
Militsiya watching protesters and protecting Russian embassy.

On 7 December 2019, Belarusian Young Front leader called the Minsk residents to go to street protests. In result, around 730 people made a human chain from the Independence Avenue to the October Square, and then went to the centre of the capital. Militsiya warned that the Minsk Executive Committee didn't permit the rally, but did not use force against protesters. Another demonstration took place on 8 December. No one was arrested, except the car driver who honked at the opposition supporters. Opposition leader Sergei Tikhanovsky was one of the leading figures during the protests, and appeared on 19 December.

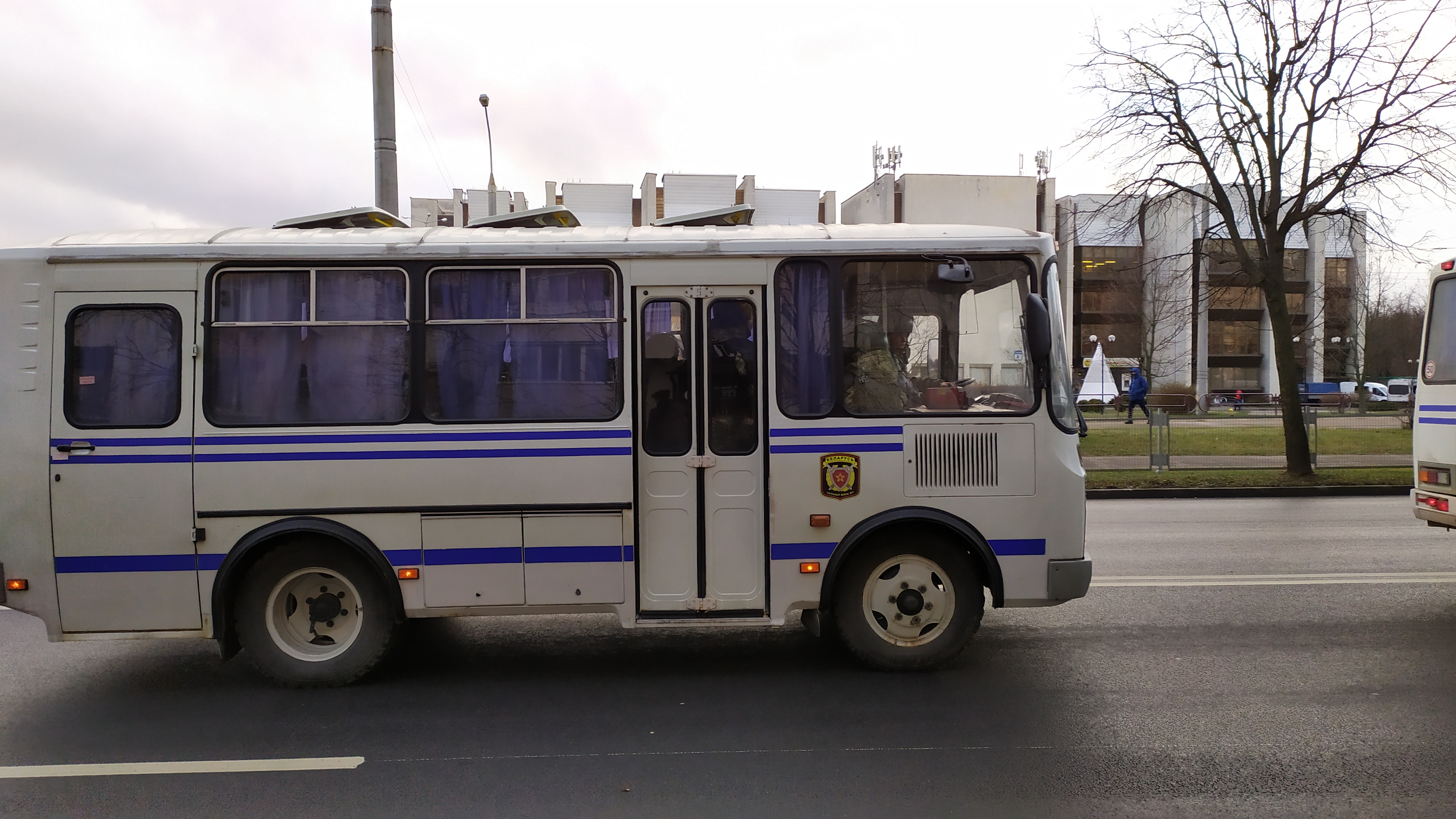
Municipal service during the protests.

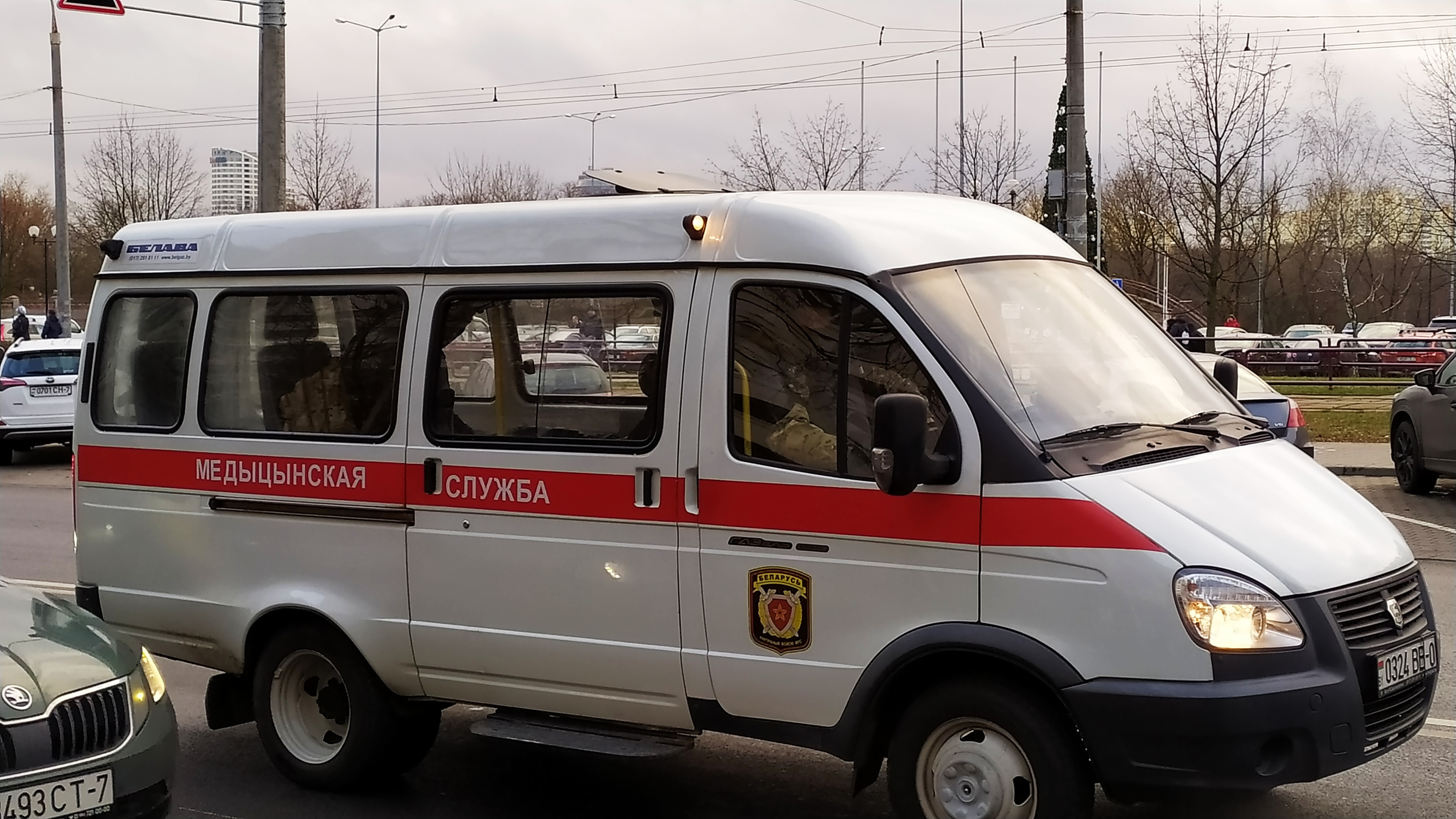
Militsiya car in Minsk with law enforcement.

Despite not using force, Militsiya created warning reports for 40 demonstrators, so on 20 December, when negotiations on integration took place in St. Petersburg, there were less demonstrators than earlier who gathered at the October Square and march to the Independence Square, when they organized a rally. The protest was repeated on 21 December, this time there was an integration supporter among other protesters.

On 29 December, another demonstration took place on the October Square where another opposition leader Vyacheslav Siuchyk demanded that the authorities disclose the content of the integration plans.

On 4 January 2020, an anti-integration protest was also held in Polotsk.

== Consequences ==
In December 2019 and January 2020, trials of demonstrators were held in Minsk and Polotsk. 13 people were arrested, including a protest organizer, who was charged with the 34,5 thousands of Belarusian ruble fine.

The protests caused the emergence of Sergei Tikhanovsky as a new popular opposition leader.
