= Rail war in Russia (2022–present) =

Part of the Russian partisan movement

2022–present rail war in Russia
- Part of the Russian partisan movement (2022–present)
- Date: 24 February 2022 – present (4 years, 8 months and 1 week)
- Caused by: Russian invasion of Ukraine
- Methods: Rail sabotage
- Status: Ongoing

Parties
Russian opposition: Stop the Wagons; Combat Organization of Anarcho-Communists; Belarusian opposition: Busly liaciać	Government of Russia: Ministry of Defence; Armed Forces; Ministry of Internal Affairs; Police; Federal Security Service; Russian Railways

The rail war began in different regions of Russia in the spring of 2022 after a similar rail war in Belarus.

According to The Insider's summary of media reports, at least 63 freight trains derailed in Russia between March and June 2022, about 50% more than during the same period in 2021.

== Organizations ==
Responsibility for the "rail war" was assumed by representatives of the "Combat Organization of Anarcho-Communists". In particular, they delayed the arrival of trains to a military unit in the Vladimir Oblast, where an arsenal of the Main Missile and Artillery Directorate of the Russian Defense Ministry is located.

On 28 June 2022 the cell "BOAK-Vladimir" published a press release claiming sabotage action on railway of military unit 55443 VD Barsovo (51st Arsenal of the Main Missile and Artillery Directorate, 1060th Centre for Material-Technical Support, Western Military District) near Kirzhach in Vladimir Oblast. The rails were damaged. BOAK's press release stated, "Every stopped train helps to get rid of missiles and rockets, which could hit peaceful Ukrainian cities!"

In mid 2022, a second group, the "Stop the Wagons" movement, was created to engage in sabotage on railways in Russia.

Also, the Belarusian organization "Busly Lyatsyats" (Busly liaciać) took responsibility for some of the partisan actions carried out on the infrastructure of the Russian Railways.

== Actions ==
=== 2022 ===
- 12 April a railway bridge was badly damaged in the Belgorod region.
- 23 April saw a locomotive leave the track and fall down an embankment in the Bryansk region, possibly accident, possibly sabotage. As a result of additional check on railway lines, on 26 April, an inert mine was discovered along a railway track in Bryansk.
- 1 May, in Kursk Oblast, a bridge on the Sudzha—Sosnovy Bor railway collapsed. The governor declared it an act of sabotage. A criminal investigation was launched.
- June a group calling themselves BO(A)K sabotaged a rail lines east of Moscow by unbolting a piece of track whilst maintaining the electrical signal to avoid detection of the damage caused.
- July saw a train drivers cab damaged by an explosive device in the Bryansk Oblas.
- August, part of the Lgov-Lokinskaya rail line was damaged by an explosion.
- 1 September saw a coal train derailed in Khakassia, East Siberia, ripping up 100m of track.
- In October 2022 an explosive device damaged the railway near the village of Novozybkov, in the Bryansk Oblast, near the Belarus border, with part of a rail broken and another buckled. Stop the Wagon claimed responsibility for the sabotage.
- The night of 4-5 November Freedom of Russia Legion set fire to a train transporting fuel near Yekaterinburg.

=== 2023 ===
- Civilian trains and military convoys were blocked by partisan sabotage during the night from 3–4 January 2023 on a part of the Trans-Siberian Railway passing through Krasnoyarsk, in the sixth railway sabotage incident of 2023.
- 1 May in Russia's Bryansk Oblast, bordering Ukraine, a locomotive and tank carriages of a freight train were derailed after an explosive device detonated along the Bryansk-Unecha railway line. Next day, 2 May, another locomotive and around 20 wagons were derailed between Snezhetskaya and the nearby village of Belye Berega, south east of Bryansk.
- 18 May four relay cabinets were burnt in Kazan, relay cabinets inform rail controllers whether there is a train on a particular section of track, delaying trains.
- July sabotage in two regions damaged relay cabinets with fire in Vladimir Oblast and another in Kirov Oblast.
- An explosion on a track in the Bryansk region, near Unecha, in August caused a freight train carrying military goods to derail.
- November 2023 saw a derailment of 19 wagons with 15 damaged, Ryazan region, southwest of Moscow. On 23 May 2025, Ruslan Sidiki was sentenced to 29 years in prison for sabotage (9 years in prison and 20 years in a penal colony) for these actions.

=== 2024 ===
- January, incidents occurred in three locations, Saratov, Yaroslavl, and Dzerzhinsk in the Nizhny Novgorod region with fires in relay boxes and explosives attached to rail tankers.

== Reactions ==
On the first day of the full-scale Russian invasion of Ukraine, 24 February 2022, the Russian Ministry of Transport ordered to increase the level of security on the railways in the southern regions of Russia. In April, Ukraine's Main Intelligence Directorate published what it said was a telegram sent by the heads of railroad sections in the Rostov and Krasnodar regions calling for cooperation with the authorities to protect the railways.

In June, RZhD-Partner magazine wrote, citing Goszheldornadzor, that more than 55% of freight train accidents in the previous four months were related to the state of the railway tracks. At the same time, the FSB at least once reported on the detention of people who had allegedly prepared acts of sabotage at a "transport infrastructure facility" in the Belgorod Region.

Two men arrested in March 2022 were sentenced in a Russian court in February 2023 to over 3 years in prison after being suspected of planning a sabotage operation. Three students from the town of Chekhov near Moscow, who had been arrested by the FSB, potentially face up to 10 year prison sentences.

By May 2023 66 individuals had been arrested in relation to railway sabotage issues, the most common offence being the burning of relay boxes, which now have a stencilled warning about the penalties of sabotage on them.

By October 2023 the number arrested had reached 150, one third are children, with 137 prosecuted in 76 cases.

== See also ==
- Rail war in Belarus (2022–present)
- Bridges in the Russo-Ukrainian War
- Russian mystery fires (2022–present)
