= Rail war in Belarus (2022–present) =

2022 conflict between the Belarusian government and pro-Ukrainian activists

2022–present rail war in Belarus
- Part of the Belarusian partisan movement (2020–present)
- Date: 28 February 2022 – 30 March 2022 (1 month and 2 days)
- Caused by: Usage of Belarusian railways by Russia during Russian invasion of Ukraine
- Goals: Termination of the use of Belarusian railways by Russia
- Methods: Rail sabotage
- Result: Opposition victory: Russian offensive on Kyiv fails

Parties
Government of Belarus: KGB; Internal Troops; Supported by: Russia	Belarusian opposition: BYPOL; Community of Railway Workers; Cyber Partisans; Busly liaciać; Independent dissidents (incl. within Belarusian security forces); Russian opposition: Combat Organization of Anarcho-Communists; Supported by: Ukraine

Casualties
- Arrested: 13

Rail sabotage is one of the Belarusian forms of grassroots action opposing the Russian invasion of Ukraine.

At the end of February 2022, the first reports appeared in the media about sabotage on Belarusian railways in order to disable manpower, signalling control equipment, and the transport of military materiel by rail for military operations on the territory of Ukraine.

The last arrest related to the "rail war" was made on 30 March 2022. Belarusian courts sentenced 13 people to a combined total of nearly 200 years in prison.

== Actions ==
Signalling equipment was destroyed in three regions of Belarus, and railway lines were blocked. As a result of these operations, the work of several branches of the Belarusian railway was disrupted, particularly in the south of Belarus. There have been some 80 acts of sabotage on Belarusian railways as of 12 April 2022, based on data from the Belarusian Interior Ministry.

The most common form of damage is setting fire to the signalling equipment. This disrupts the lights on the railway system, forcing trains to slow to 15–20 km/h (9–12 mph). A married couple set fire to the logs of railway tracks. Other acts of sabotage have involved the railway's workers themselves as well as hackers attacking the railway's computer system. The Deputy Interior Minister threatened to kill the partisans in a statement in early March. Shots were fired at people attempting to set fire to a signal box in late March.

Setting fire to relay cabinets has proved a favourite form of sabotage, this stops the railway system knowing if part of a track is occupied, or not, by a train. In March 2022, the Belarusian section of the Gomel-Chernihiv-Kyiv railway was put out of service this way.

The opposition's actions assisted Ukrainian forces in defeating the 2022 Russian offensive which aimed to conquer Kyiv.

== Reactions ==
In late April 2022, the Belarusian House of Representatives passed a law to apply the death penalty for sabotage.

== See also ==
- Rail War
- Rail war in Russia (2022–present)
