= Minsk Spring =

1996–1997 protests in Minsk, Belarus

- Date: 24 March 1996 — 26 April 1997 (1 year, 1 month and 2 days)
- Location: Minsk, Belarus
- Caused by: Creation of Union State, authoritarian rule of President Alexander Lukashenko
- Goals: Cancellation of the agreement "On the Community of Belarus and Russia", resignation of Lukashenko
- Methods: rally, peaceful marches
- Result: Adjustment of the Union State treaty, refutation of the unification of Belarus and Russia into a single state

Parties
Presidency of Belarus: (Belarus) Presidential Administration; Internal Troops; Police; OMON; Union State supporters	(Belarus) Belarusian opposition: Belarusian Popular Front; UNA-UNSO

Lead figures
Alexander Lukashenko (Belarus) Mikhail Myasnikovich (Belarus) Vsevolod Yanchevski with the support of: Boris Yeltsin	(Belarus) Zianon Pazniak (Belarus) Vasil Bykaŭ (Belarus) Mikola Statkevich

Number
Unknown	50-70 thousand

The "Minsk Spring" or "Belarusian Spring" (Belarusian: "Мінская вясна", romanized: "Minskaja viasna", "Беларуская вясна", "Biełaruskaja viasna") was a series of mass street protests in 1996 and 1997 against the increasingly-authoritarian rule of President Alexander Lukashenko.

== Background and causes ==
The protests were triggered by a constitutional referendum on amendments to the 1994 Constitution of Belarus. The referendum was called following a dispute between President Lukashenko and the elected parliament, the Thirteenth Supreme Council, over the president's proposal to amend the constitution to extend his term of office from five to seven years, create a second legislative chamber whose members would be appointed by the president, and limit the power of the Constitutional Court.

Officially, the public voted in favor of the amendments by a wide majority, although many countries, including European Union member states and the United States sharply criticized the conditions under which the referendum was held as "riddled with violations of democratic norms" and refused to recognize its results:

"The constitutional referendum occurred in a repressive political environment and with pervasive government control of the media. Through this control, the Government denied the voters access to the views of the opposition--including members of Parliament and of the Constitutional Court". The referendum resulted in the dissolution of the Supreme Council, which was replaced by a new, bicameral parliament. The president handpicked the members of the lower chamber and gained substantial influence over the upper chamber. The net result was the effective removal of all representatives of opposition parties from government.

== Protests and their suppression ==
The protests in the spring of 1996 started with commemoration of an anniversary of the Belarusian Democratic Republic on 24 March and peaked during the Chernobyl Way-96 on 26 April 1996, which became one of the largest rallies in the period between the anti-Soviet protests of 1991 and the 2020 Belarusian revolution. According to various estimates, between 60 and 100 thousand people took to the central avenue of Minsk.

Following the constitutional changes in November 1996, the Belarusian political system became increasingly authoritarian with the government seeking to curtail all political freedoms. The authorities did not sanction most of requested street demonstrations and then brutally dispersed "unsanctioned" ones. They began to apply a wide range of repressive measures against their participants – from brutal police force to fines and administrative arrests to expulsion of students and dismissal of employees on political grounds.

Arbitrary and violent arrests of demonstrators, without regard to age or infirmity, became commonplace. In violation of the terms of both the Belarusian constitution and international instruments such as the International Covenant on Civil and Political Rights (ICCPR), to which Belarus is a state party, Lukashenka issued a draconian decree in March 1997, codified into law later that year, which severely limited the right to citizens to demonstrate, regulating the even the types of symbols, flags, and banners participants may use.

The protests resumed in the spring of 1997 with at least 10,000 demonstrators marching through central Minsk on 16 March.

Charter 97, a declaration calling for democracy in Belarus was published on the anniversary of the 1996 referendum.

== Personalities of the Belarusian Spring ==
- Zianon Pazniak
- Vasil Bykaŭ
- Pavel Sheremet
- Vera Cerlukevič

== See also ==
- Belarusian democracy movement
- 1991 Belarusian protests
- 2010 Belarusian protests
- 2020 Belarusian protests
