= Belarusian opposition =

Democratic political movement

- The white-red-white flag of the Republic of Belarus (1991–1995), also used as the official flag of the Belarusian Democratic Republic (1918–1919), is currently used by various opposition groups and individuals
- Date: 3 June 1988 – present (38 years, 4 months, 3 weeks and 5 days)
- Location: 1988–1991: Byelorussian SSR; 1995–present: Belarus
- Caused by: Authoritarianism; Political repression; Corruption; Russo-Ukrainian war (Post-2022)
- Methods: Demonstrations; Online activism; Partisan activity (Post-2020)
- Status: Ongoing

Parties
1988–1991:
(Belarus) Belarusian Popular Front
1995–present:
- Opposition
  - Supreme Council of Belarus (1995–1996)
  - Supreme Court of Belarus (1995–1996)
  - Constitutional Court of Belarus (1995–1996)
  - Rada BNR
  - United Transitional Cabinet
  - Coordination Council
  - National Strike Committee
  - Belarusian Christian Democracy
  - BPF Party
  - Conservative Christian Party – BPF
  - Belarusian Left Party "A Just World"
  - Belarusian Social Democratic Assembly
  - Belarusian Social Democratic Party (Hramada)
  - Belarusian Social Democratic Party (People's Hramada)
  - Party of Freedom and Progress
  - United Civic Party
  - Young Front
  - Youth Bloc
  - Anarchist
    - Revolutionary Action
    - Anarchist Black Cross
    - Pramen
  - Right Alliance
  - Belarusian Students' Association
  - BAPC
  - Belsat TV
  - Independent dissidents
And others...
- (Belarus) Partisans (post-2020)
  - Supraciŭ
    - Cyber Partisans
    - People's Self-Defense Brigades "DNS"
    - Busly liaciać
  - BYPOL
  - "Paspalitaje rušeńnie"
  - Community of Railway Workers
  - Kastuś Kalinoŭski Regiment
  - Defectors from Belarusian security forces
Supported by:
Ukraine
Russian opposition
European Union
1988–1991:
- Soviet Union
  - Byelorussian Soviet Socialist Republic
1995–present:
- (Belarus) Government
  - KGB
    - Alpha Group
  - Ministry of Internal Affairs
    - Internal Troops
    - OMON
    - Almaz
    - Militsiya
    - GUBOPiK
  - Ministry of Defence
    - Armed Forces
  - Presidential Security Service
- Political parties:
  - Belaya Rus
  - (Byelorussian Soviet Socialist Republic) Communist Party of Belarus
  - Liberal Democratic Party of Belarus
  - Republican Party of Labour and Justice
- Public associations:
  - Federation of Trade Unions of Belarus
  - Belarusian Republican Youth Union
Supported by:
Russia

Lead figures
1988–1991: (Belarus) Zianon Pazniak 1995–present: (Belarus) Zianon Pazniak (Belarus) Myechyslaw Hryb (Belarus) Syamyon Sharetski (Belarus) Vasil Bykaŭ (Belarus) Alaksandar Milinkievič (Belarus) Mikola Statkevich (Belarus) Sergei Tikhanovsky (Belarus) Sviatlana Tsikhanouskaya	1988–1991: (Byelorussian Soviet Socialist Republic) Yefrem Sokolov (Byelorussian Soviet Socialist Republic) Anatoly Malofeyev 1995–present: Alexander Lukashenko

The Belarusian opposition consists of groups and individuals in Belarus seeking to challenge, from 1988 to 1991, the authorities of Soviet Belarus, and since 1995, the leader of the country Alexander Lukashenko, whom supporters of the movement often consider to be a dictator. Supporters of the movement tend to call for a parliamentary democracy based on a Western model, with freedom of speech and political and religious pluralism. The opposition movement vary in political ideology, ranging from liberals, socialists, anarchists, and Polish minority activists to Belarusian nationalists.

== Background ==
The modern Belarusian democracy movement originated in the late 1980s when Mikhail Gorbachev's Perestroika and the Chernobyl disaster exposed the serious shortcomings of the Soviet system and galvanized a significant section of Belarusians around the issues of environment, de-Stalinization, national revival and democratic change.

The dissolution of the Soviet Union brought about a brief period of democracy from 1991 to 1994. However, since his election in 1994, Alexander Lukashenko established an authoritarian rule by 1996, creating a political system which the United Nations Human Rights Council (UNHRC) stated is "incompatible with the concept of human rights".

== History ==
=== 1988 anti-Soviet protests ===
On 3 June 1988, the Minsk-based weekly "Litaratura i mastatstva" ("Literature And Art") published an article by archeologists Zianon Pazniak and Yauhen Shmyhalyou about the unearthing of 500 mass graves of Stalinist victims in Kurapaty on the outskirts of the Belarusian capital. The article was the first publication in Belarus about crimes of the Soviet-era authorities. This was followed in October that year by the establishment of the Martyrology of Belarus to commemorate the victims of communism, and an organizational committee for the creation of the Belarusian Popular Front, which subsequently became an ardent advocate of Belarus's independence from the Soviet Union.

On 30 October 1988, riot police in Minsk violently dispersed a mass demonstration to commemorate the victims of Stalinism at Kurapaty – the first of many such clashes in modern Belarusian history.

=== Establishment of the Belarusian Popular Front ===
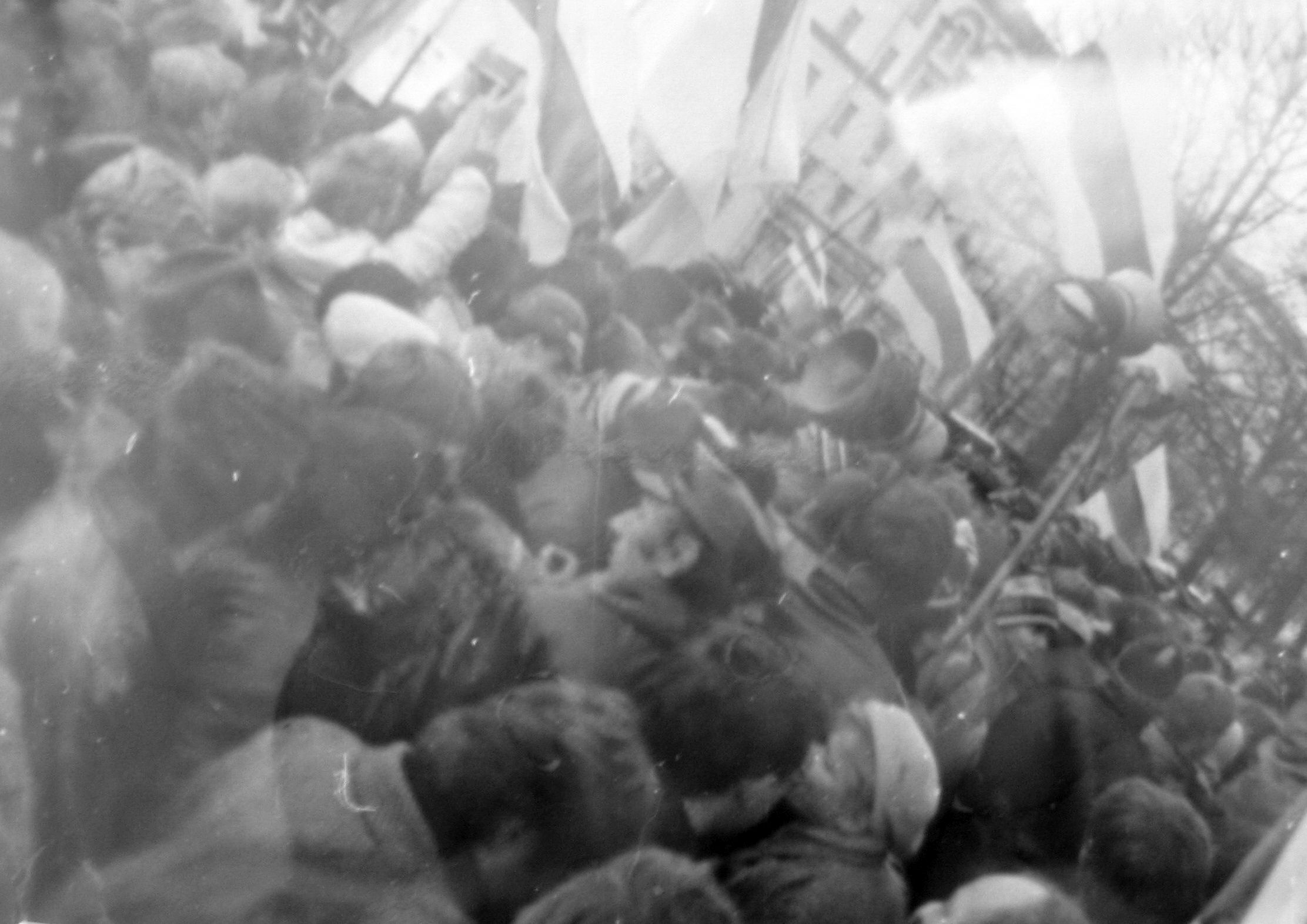
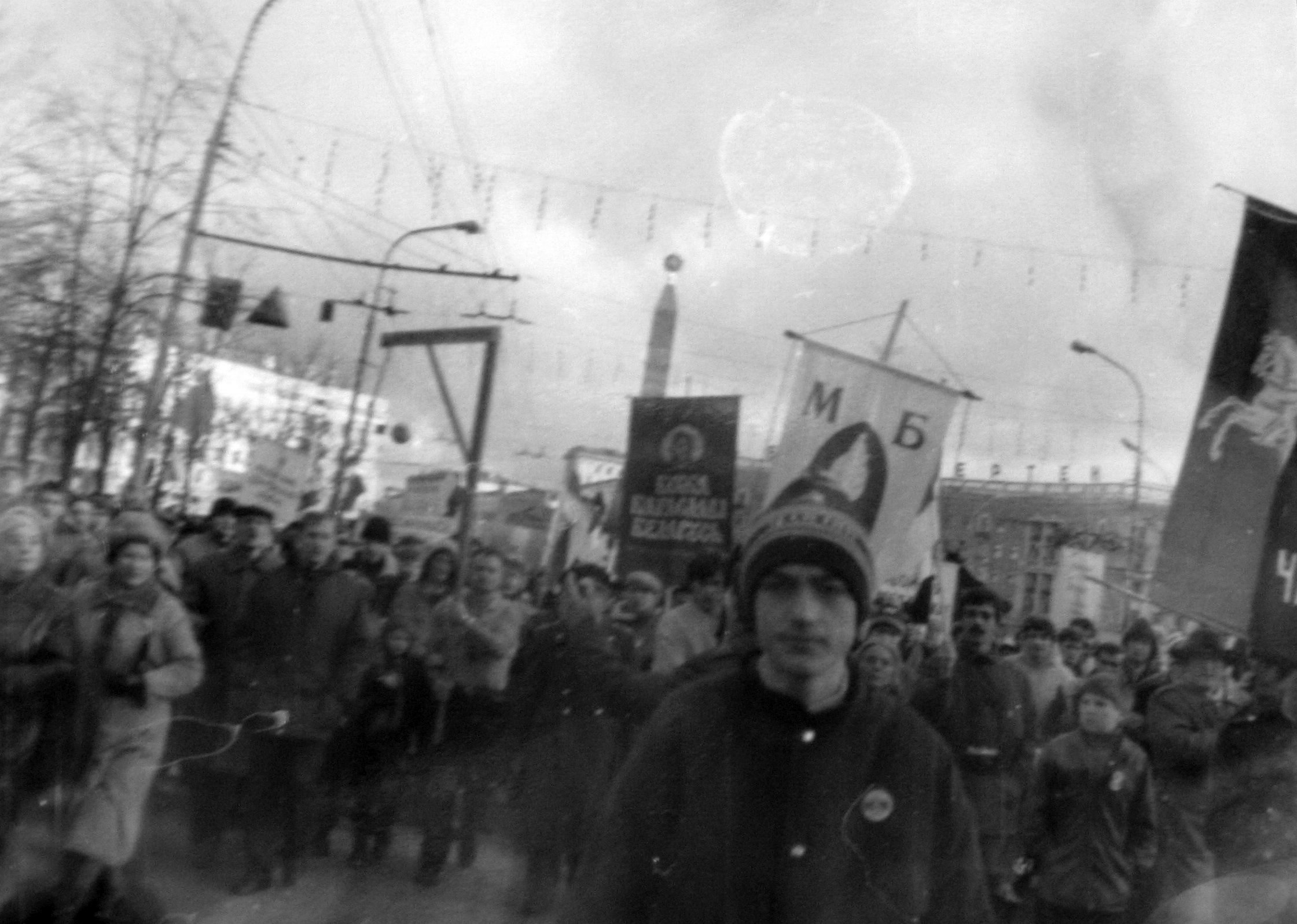
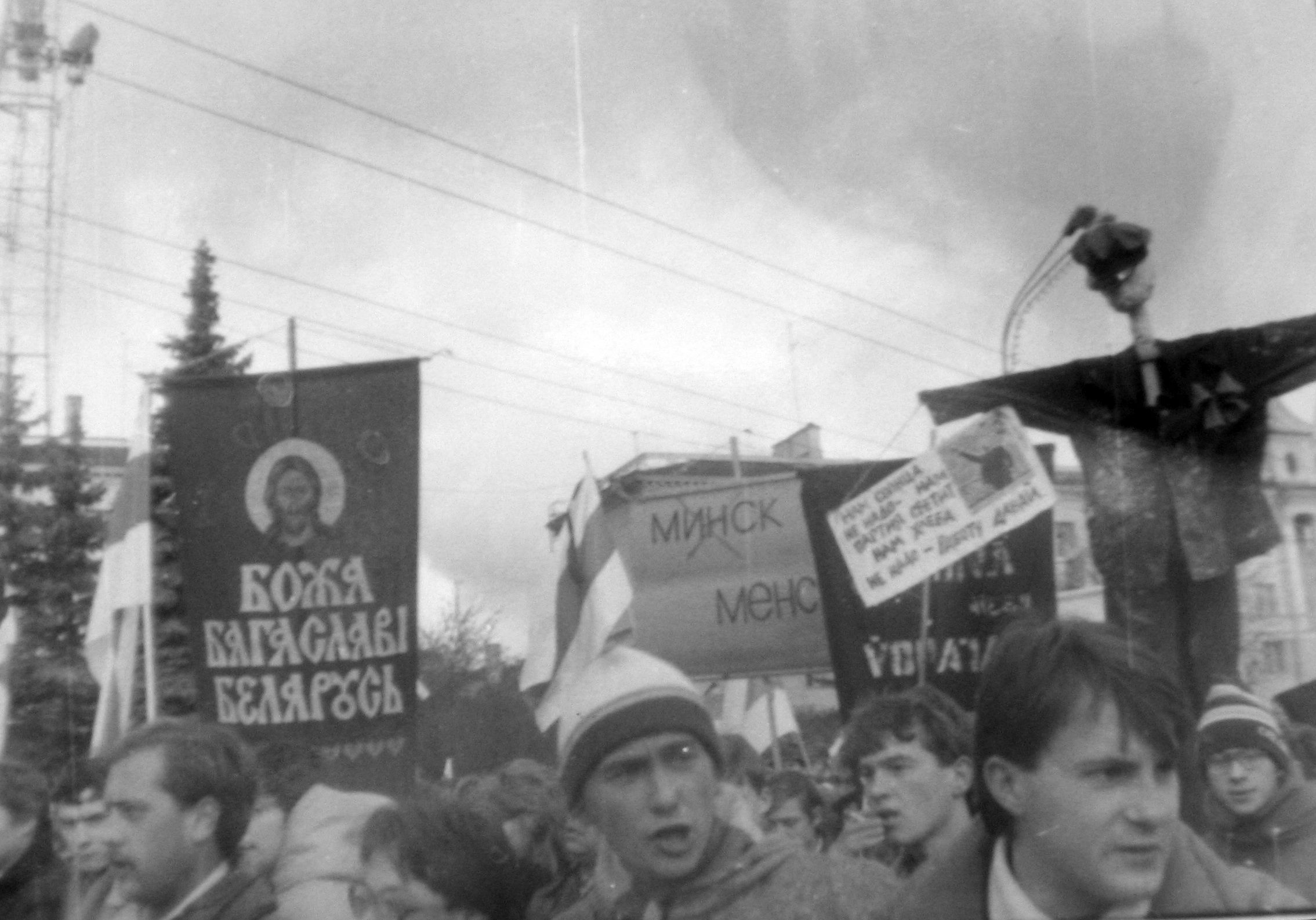
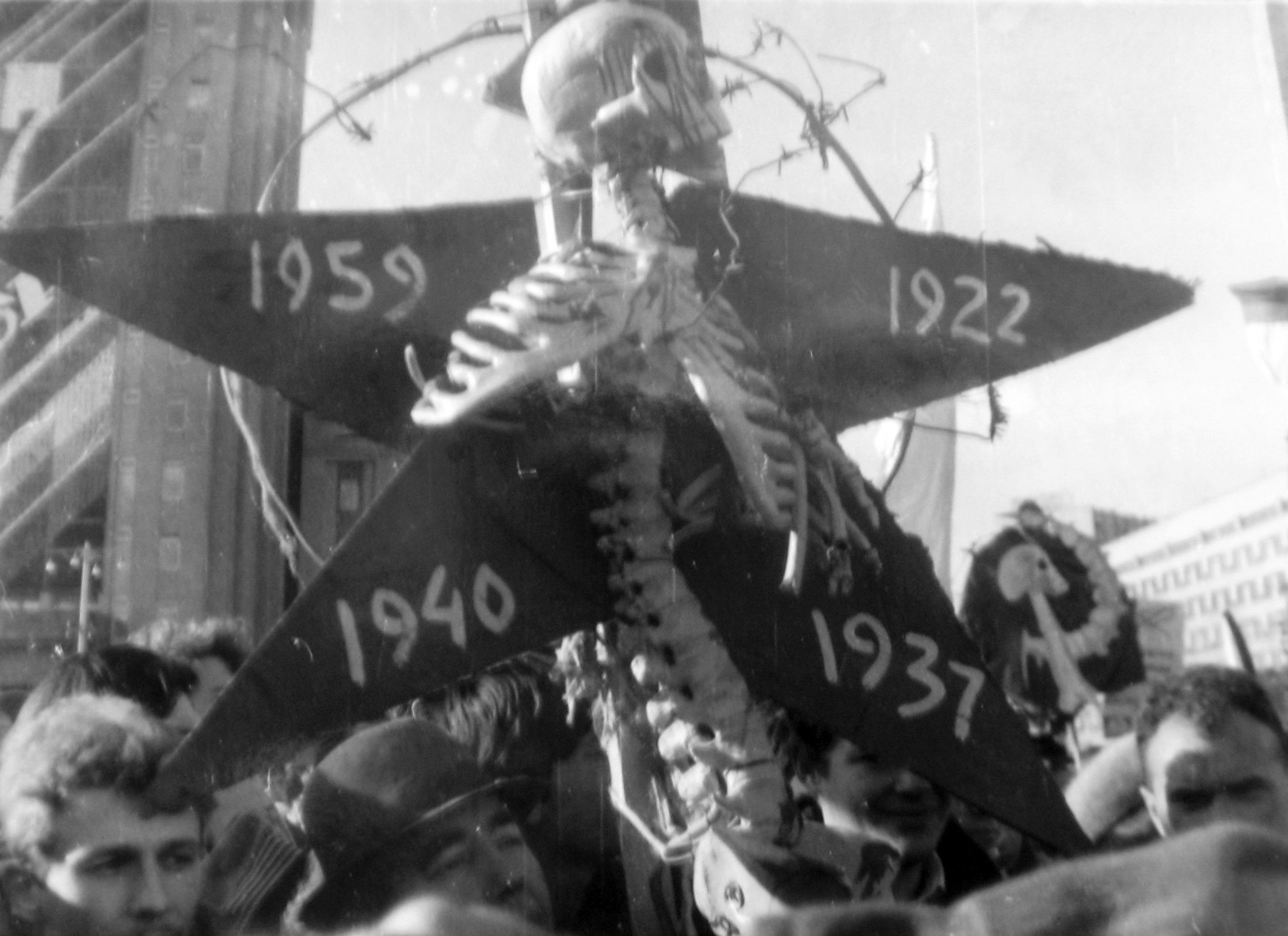
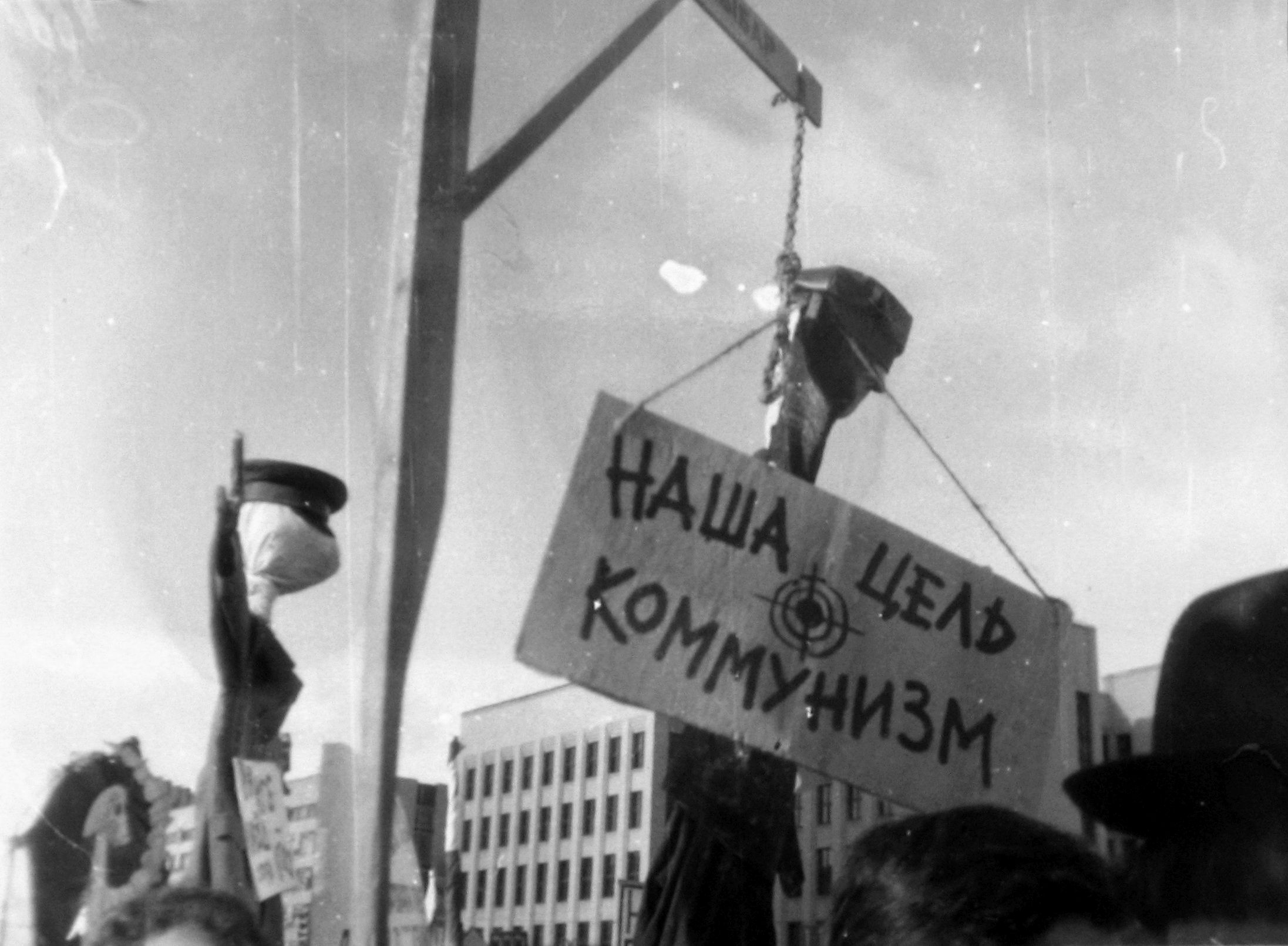
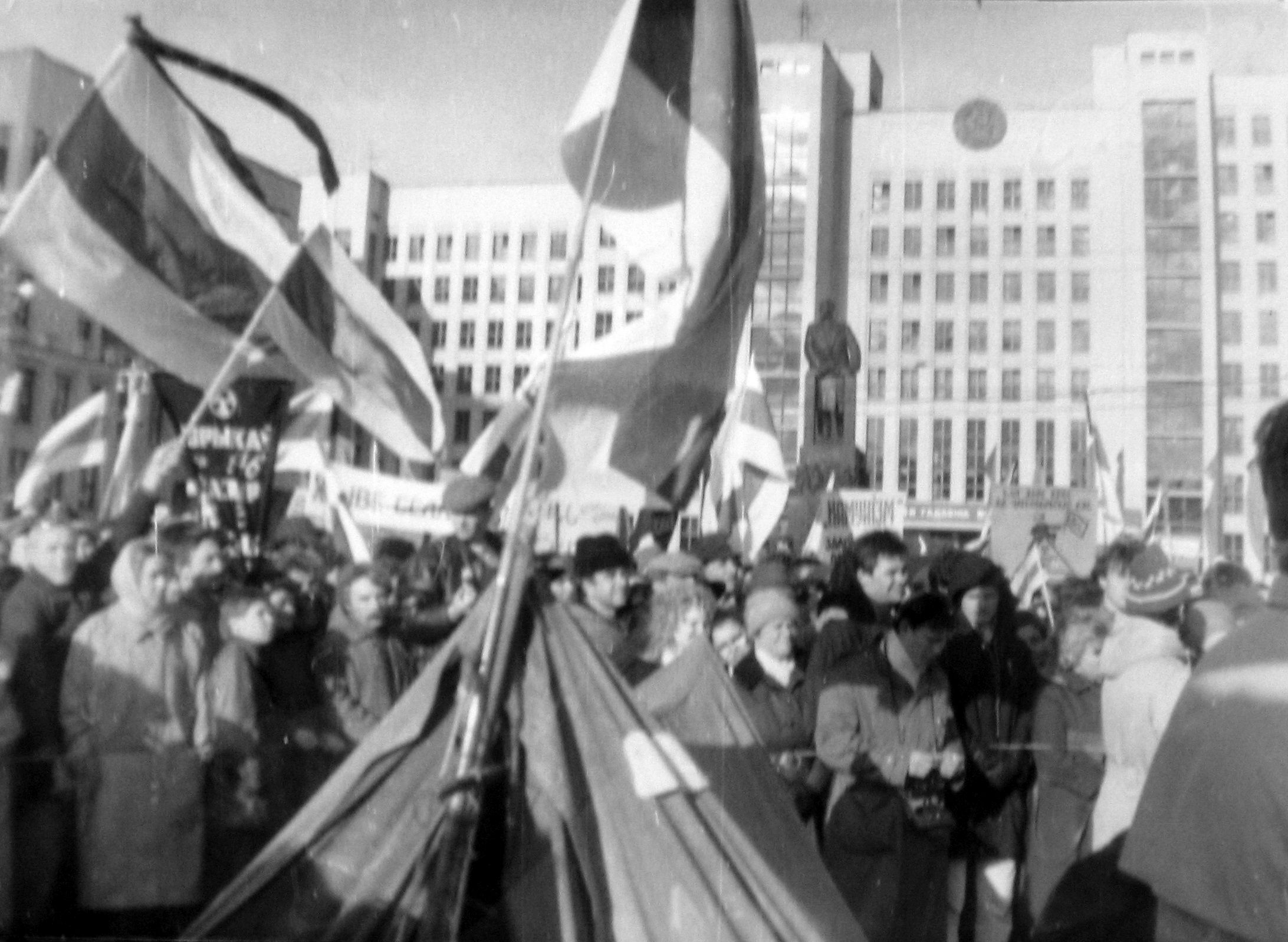
Anti-communist demonstration in the Supreme Soviet of Belarus, 7 November 1990

On 24 and 25 June 1989, the Belarusian Popular Front “Revival” (Belarusian: Адраджэньне, romanized: Adradžeńnie) was formally established with Pazniak as chairman.

This group carried out an anti-communist manifestation on 7 November 1990, the anniversary of the October Revolution, under the Lenin Monument in Minsk in front of the Supreme Soviet of the Byelorussian SSR, in memory of the regime's victims.

=== 1991 Belarusian Strikes ===
The 1991 Belarusian Strikes were a series of nationwide strikes and pro-independence rallies against the Soviet authorities and their policies. Falling living standards and unemployment along with Glasnost and Perestroika policies also sparked massive demonstrations and unrest by mostly young people, demanding democracy and leading labour protests across Belarus.

In 1990, Belarus held its first competitive parliamentary election to the Supreme Soviet, which upon the dissolution of the Soviet Union declared Belarus an independent nation.

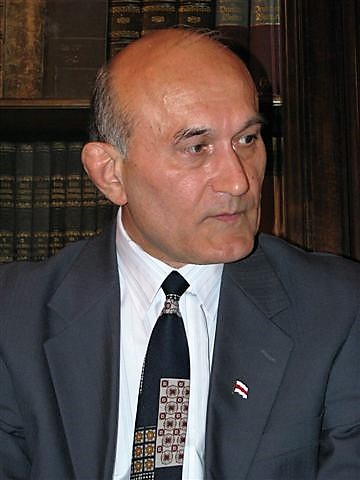
Zianon Pazniak, leader of the Belarusian Popular Front, the main anti-communist and anti-Lukashenko movement from 1988 to 1996.

=== Election of Lukashenko ===
On 23 June and 10 July 1994, Belarus held its first presidential election, won by Lukashenko. From 1995, he began to consolidate his power at the expense of the Parliament and other institutions.

=== 1995–1996 Belarusian constitutional crisis ===
Lukashenko engaged in a visible and brutal confrontation with the Supreme Council and Supreme Court, using violence and bomb hoax to disperse the hunger strike of opposition-aligned parliamentarians that stayed in a Supreme Council building for a nighth from 11 to 12 April 1995, harassing them and forcing to accept a referendum that liquidated national white-red white flag and replaced it with a one similar to the Byelorussian Soviet Socialist Republic.

Lukashenko was threatened from summer to November 1996, when opposition voted 73 from 199 votes to impeach him, with support of the Supreme Court. However, Russia intervened with Prime Minister Viktor Chernomyrdin acted like a mediatiator, which de facto supported and saved Lukashenko and helped him to ultimately dissolve the Supreme Council via referendum.

=== Minsk Spring (1996–97) ===
A series of mass street protests called “Minsk Spring” or “Belarusian Spring” took place in the springs of 1996–97 triggered by a constitutional referendum on amendments to the 1994 Constitution of Belarus. The Belarusian political system became increasingly authoritarian with the government seeking to curtail all political freedoms.

=== Charter 97 ===
Charter 97 is a human rights group taking its inspiration from the 1997 declaration calling for democracy in Belarus. The document – whose title deliberately echoes the Czechoslovak human rights declaration Charter 77 twenty years earlier – was created on the anniversary of the referendum held in 1996, and which, in the words of the organization, declares "devotion to the principles of independence, freedom and democracy, respect to the human rights, solidarity with everybody, who stands for elimination of dictatorial regime and restoration of democracy in Belarus."

=== Freedom March (1999) ===
On 17 October 1999, dozens of Belarusians took to the streets to rally against the impending implementation of the Union State of Belarus with Russia, forming a confederation and ending Belarus' independence. In response to the march, the Belarusian government suspended further integration between the two states.

=== Jeans Revolution (2006) ===
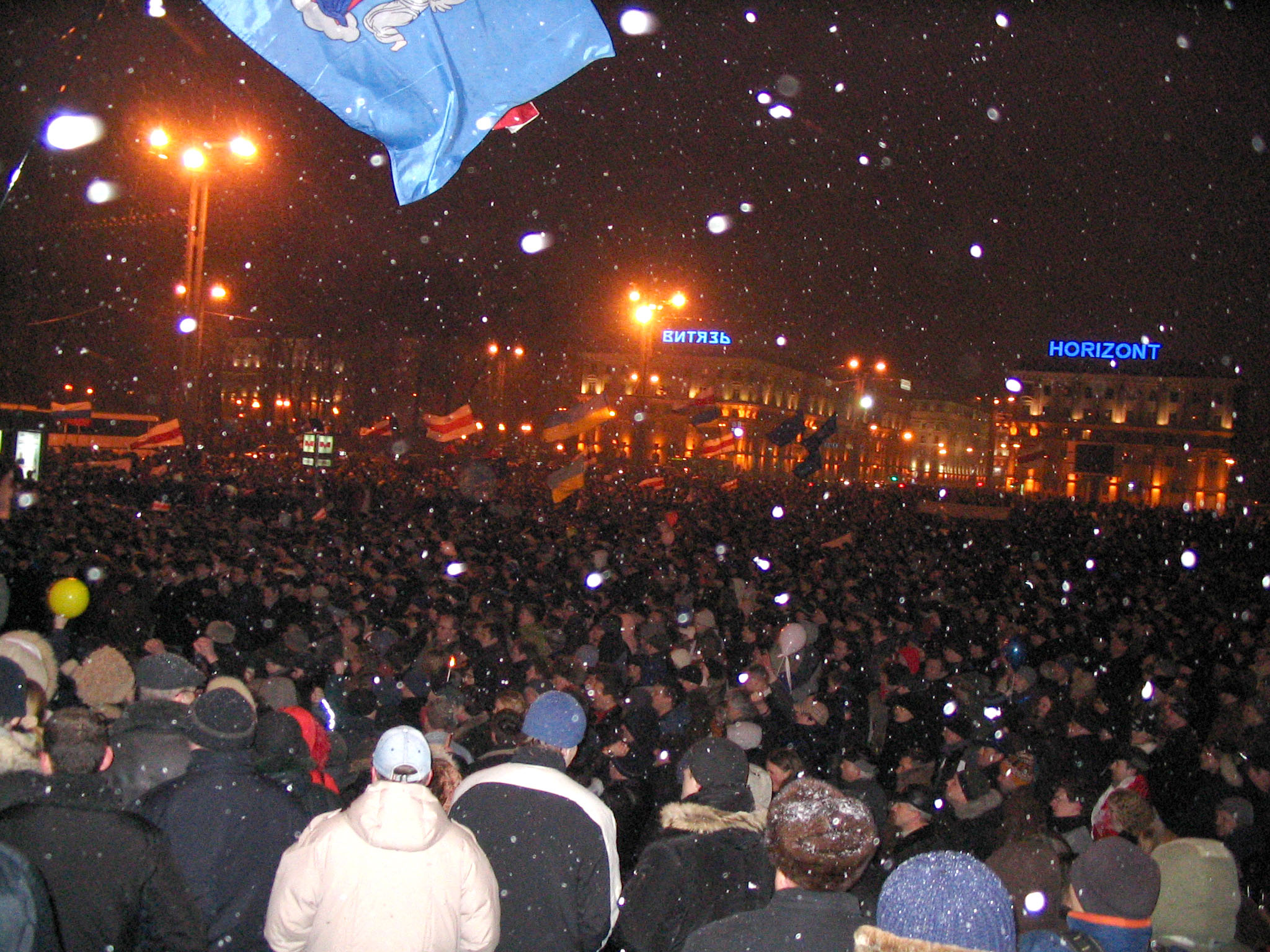
Protests at October Square in Minsk, 19 March 2006

The Jeans Revolution was a term used by the opposition in Belarus and its supporters to describe their effort and aspirations on democratic changes in Belarus, in the period leading up to the 2006 presidential election.

=== 2010 presidential election ===
After the 2010 Belarusian presidential election, up to 40,000 people protested against Lukashenko. Up to 700 opposition activists, including 7 presidential candidates, were arrested in the post-election crackdown.

Several websites of the opposition and opposition candidates were also blocked or hacked. Facebook, Twitter, YouTube, Google Talk, many email services and LiveJournal were also blocked. The headquarters of Charter 97, the opposition group and website, was stormed by Lukashenko's security forces and all of its staff were arrested.

According to The Independent, Lukashenko's security forces went after his opponents "with a ferocity that would not have looked out of place in Soviet times".

=== 2011 protests ===
A series of protests influenced by a serious economic crisis took place in 2011. As a result of these protests, on 29 July, the government banned assemblies and gatherings.

=== 2017 protests ===
Due to an ongoing economic recession, continuing since the last series of protests in 2015, due to falling gasoline prices, that year a law was passed taxing the unemployed. Roughly 470,000 Belarusians are obliged to pay the tax but only about 10% have since it was issued.

Approximately 2,500 protesters filled the streets in the capital of Belarus, Minsk, on 17 February to protest a policy that required those who work for less than 183 days per year to pay USD$250 for "lost taxes" to help fund welfare policies. This converts to approximately Rbls 5 million—a half-month's wages. The law has proven unpopular and has been mocked in the public as the "law against social parasites". On 19 February, another 2,000 demonstrated in the second city of Homieĺ. Both gatherings were peaceful. Smaller demonstrations were held in other cities.

On 25 March, opposition leader Vladimir Nekliayev, who was set to speak at the main protest, was allegedly stopped in the morning on his way to Minsk.

The government defended the mass arrests and beatings against citizens by alleging that the police had found "petrol bombs and arms-laden cars" near a protest in Minsk.

=== 2019 protests ===
Another protests erupted on 7 December 2019 and their goal was to stop the integration with Russia into a Union State. These demonstrations were led by Paval Sieviaryniec and a new opposition figure Sergei Tikhanovsky. They demanded Belarusian sovereignty, resignation of Alexander Lukashenko and democratization. Belarusian government again used repression against protesters which were quelled on 29 December.

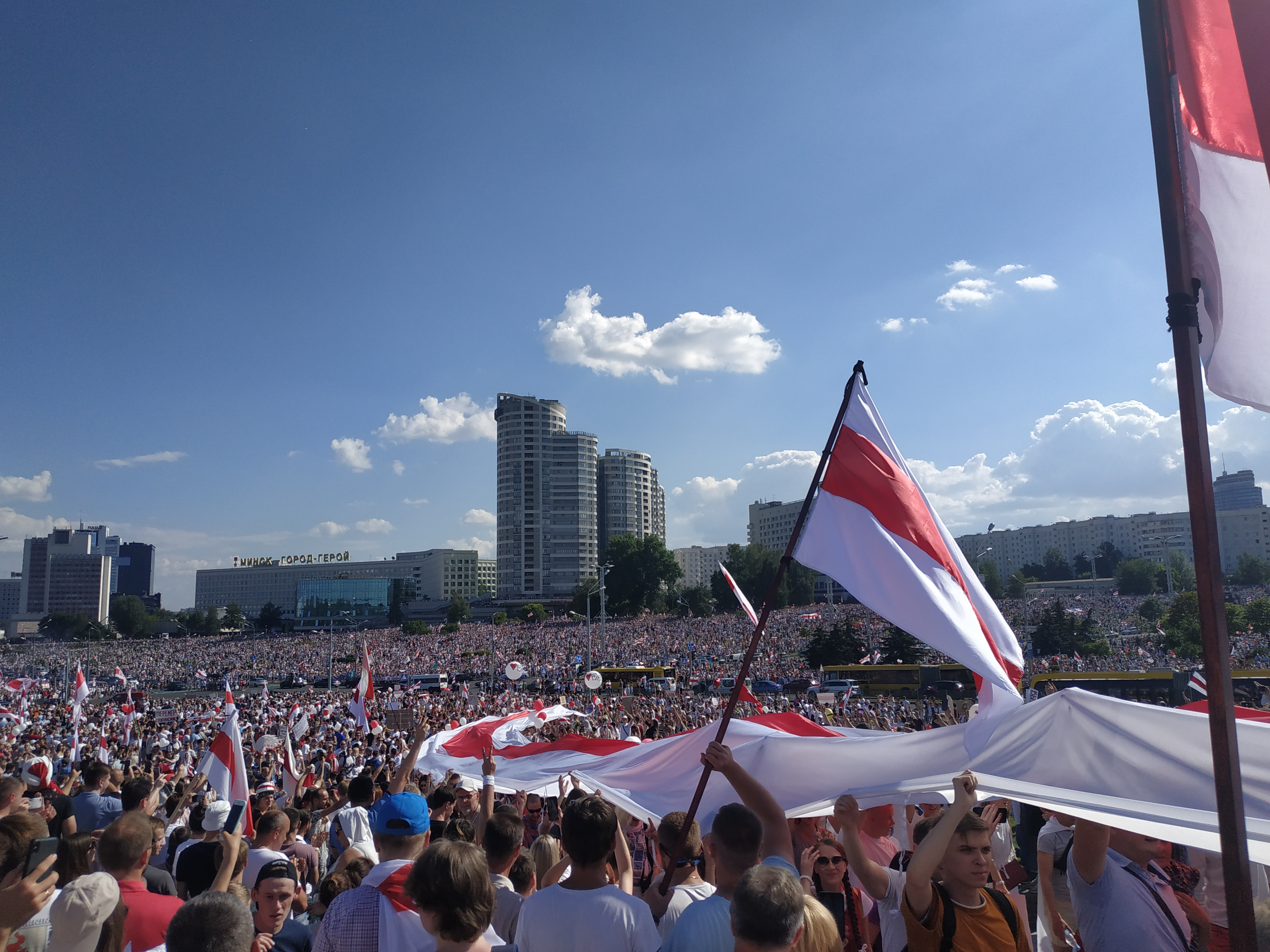
Protests in Minsk 16 August 2020

=== 2020 presidential election, protests, and partisan movement ===
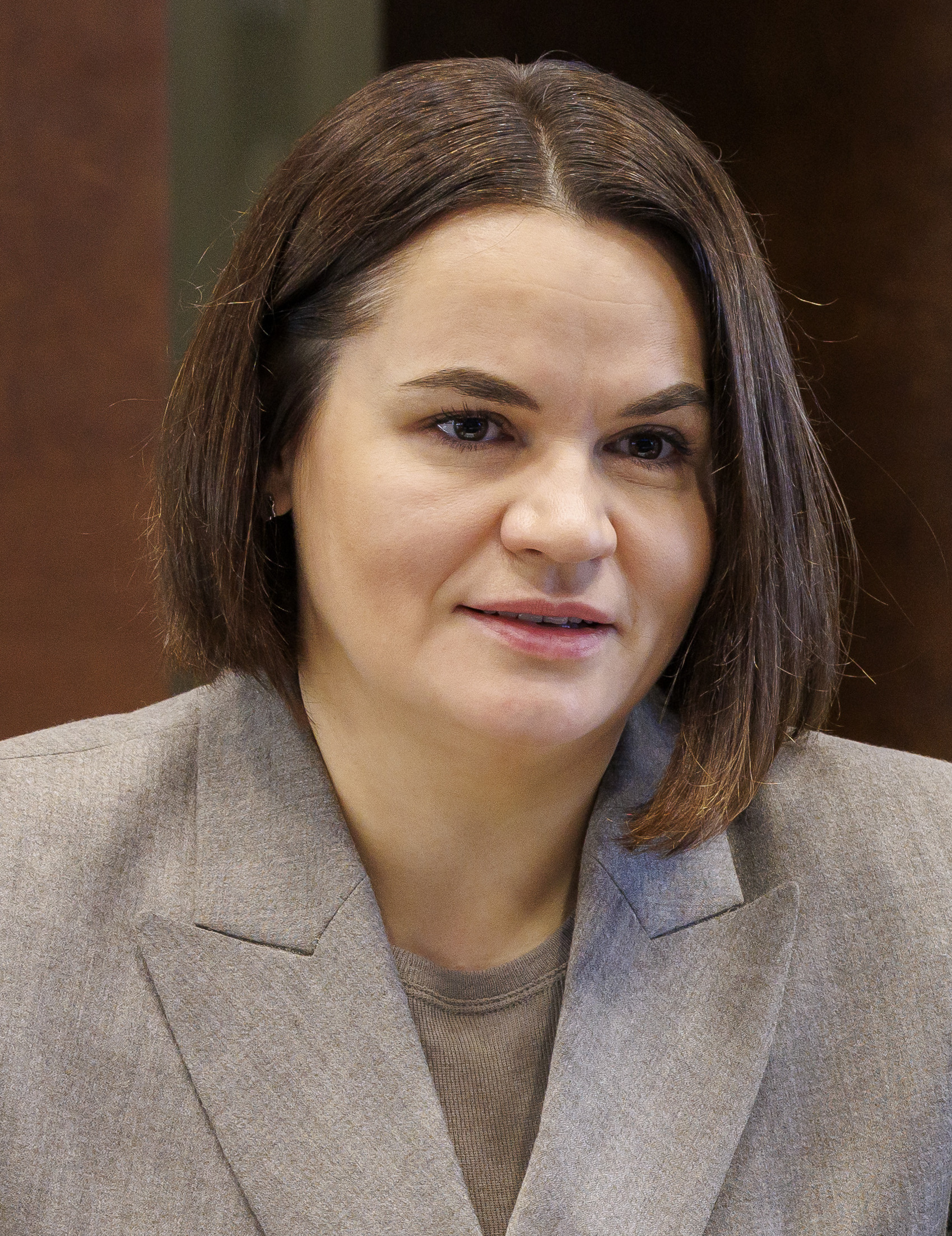
Belarusian opposition government-in-exile leader, Sviatlana Tsikhanouskaya, in 2024

In May 2020, a lowered approval of Lukashenko amid his handling of the COVID-19 pandemic led to street protests and the blogger Sergei Tikhanovsky labeling Lukashenko as a cockroach as in the children's poem "The Monster Cockroach", referring to a slipper signifying stamping the insect. Many opposition candidates registered for the next election as a result of the movement, but many of them were arrested.

Mass protests erupted across Belarus following the 2020 Belarusian presidential election which was marred by allegations of widespread electoral fraud. Subsequently, opposition presidential candidate Sviatlana Tsikhanouskaya, Tikhanovsky's wife, claimed she had won the presidential election with between 60 and 70% of the vote and formed a Coordination Council to facilitate the peaceful and orderly transfer of power in Belarus. Online groups on Telegram such as Nexta, as well as smaller decentralised groups, played an important role in the spread of information and coordination of opposition activities. The 2020 presidential campaign attracted an unprecedented number of new actors who entered politics from fields such as business, IT, and marketing.

The suppression of the protests resulted in the intensification of an ongoing partisan movement within the country, which is backed by the Coordination Council. Leading partisan formations include the Supraciǔ (an alliance between the Cyber Partisans, People's Self Defense Brigades, and Busly liaciać), the Community of Railway Workers of Belarus, and BYPOL, among others.

=== Freedom Day ===
Freedom Day (Belarusian: Дзень Волі, romanized: Dzień Voli) is an unofficial holiday in Belarus celebrated on 25 March to commemorate the declaration of independence by the Belarusian Democratic Republic by the Third Constituent Charter on that date in 1918. The day has been used annually by the Belarusian democracy movement to protest against Alexander Lukashenko since his election.

=== Russian invasion of Ukraine ===
Protests emerged from the Belarusian opposition condemning Lukashenko's support and involvement with the Russian invasion of Ukraine on 27 February 2022, shortly after the war's beginning. According to the Ministry of Internal Affairs, over 800 people had been detained for involvement within these protests. Activists from the opposition later engaged in activity to support Ukraine in the conflict, including attacks on the Belarusian Railway, a state railroad which had been utilized by Russia to support the Kyiv offensive.

== Opposition parties and organisations ==
- Coordination Council
- Rada of the Belarusian Democratic Republic
- Belarusian Popular Front "Revival"
- Belarusian Association of Military People
- Belarusian Association of Journalists
- Martyrology of Belarus"
- Belarus Free Theatre
- Belarusian Christian Democracy
- Belarusian Green Party
- Belarusian Women's Party "Nadzieja"
- Cyber Partisans
- People's Self Defense Brigades
- Busly liaciać
- Party of Freedom and Progress
- United Civic Party of Belarus
- Young Front
- Belarusian Social Democratic Assembly
- Belarusian Social Democratic Party (Assembly)
- Belarusian Social Democratic Party (People's Assembly)
- United Civic Party
- A Just World
- BPF Party
- Conservative Christian Party – BPF
- BYPOL
- Paspalitaje rušeńnie
- Combat Organization of Anarcho-Communists
- Union of Poles in Belarus
- National Anti-Crisis Management

== Opposition figures ==
- Stanislav Shushkevich † (Note: Former heads of state)
- Sviatlana Tsikhanouskaya (Note: In exile since 2020)
- Sergei Tikhanousky (Note: Imprisoned from 2020 to 2025, in exile since 2025)
- Zianon Pazniak (Note: In exile since 1996)
- Andrzej Poczobut (Note: Arrested in 2011 and 2012, imprisoned from 2021 to 2026, in exile since 2026, Sakharov Prize laureate in 2025)
- Andżelika Borys (Note: Imprisoned from 2021 to 2022)
- Igor Bancer (Note: Imprisoned from 2020 to 2021, in exile since 2022)
- Uładzimir Hančaryk
- Alaksandar Milinkievič (Note: Arrested in 2006 and 2007)
- Pavel Latushko (Note: Former Minister of Culture from 2009 to 2012, in exile since 2020)
- Viktar Babaryka (Note: Imprisoned from 2020 to 2025, in exile since 2025)
- Ales Bialiatski (Note: Imprisoned from 2011 to 2014 and from 2021 to 2025, in exile since 2025, laureate od Right Livelihood Award in 2020 and Nobel Peace Prize in 2022)
- Myechyslaw Hryb (Note: Former heads of state)
- Andrei Ostapovich (Note: In exile since 2020)
- Aliaksandra Herasimenia (Note: In exile since 2020)
- Margarita Levchuk (Note: In exile since 2020)
- Vladzimir Astapenka (Note: In exile since 2020)
- Hanna Kanapatskaya
- Andrei Sannikov (Note: Former Deputy Foreign Minister from 1995 to 1996, arrested in 2006, imprisoned from 2010 to 2012, in exile since 2012)
- Vasil Bykaŭ † (Note: In exile from 1998 to 2003, opposed to both Soviet Belarus and Lukashenko)
- Ales Adamovich † (Note: Opposed to Soviet Belarus)
- Mikola Statkevich (Note: Imprisoned since 2020, briefly released in 2025 but refused to cross the border with Lithuania which led to his renewed imprisonment until another release in February 2026)
- Valery Kavaleuski (Note: In exile since 2020)
- Valery Sakhashchyk (Note: In exile since 2020)
- Tatsiana Zaretskaya (Note: In exile since 2020)
- Alina Koushyk (Note: In exile since 2007)
- Uladzimir Nyaklyayew (Note: In exile since 1999)
- Pavel Shurmei (Note: Currently fighting in Ukraine)
- Dzianis Procharaŭ (Note: Currently fighting in Ukraine)
- Vadzim Kabanchuk (Note: Currently fighting in Ukraine)
- Aliaksiej Skoblia † (Note: Killed in Ukraine)
- Alyaksandr Feduta (Note: Imprisoned in 2011 and since 2022)
- Volha Harbunova (Note: Imprisoned from 2021 to 2022, escaped in exile)
- Marharyta Vorychava (Note: In exile since 2020)
- Aliaksandr Azarau (Note: In exile since 2020)
- Valery Tsepkalo (Note: In exile since 2020)
- Veronika Tsepkalo (Note: In exile since 2020)
- Maria Kalesnikava (Note: Imprisoned from 2020 to 2025, in exile since 2025)
- Svetlana Alexievich (Note: In exile since 2020)
- Paval Sieviaryniec (Note: Imprisoned from 2005 to 2007, 2010 to 2013, in 2020 and since 2021)
- Veronika Cherkasova †
- Pavel Pernikaŭ (Note: Imprisoned from 2022 to 2023)
- Gennady Mozheyko (Note: Imprisoned since 2021)
- Eduard Palčys (Note: Imprisoned since 2020)
- Gennady Shutau †
- Zmitser Dashkevich (Note: Imprisoned from to 2006 to 2008, 2011 to 2013 and since 2022)
- Maxim Znak (Note: Imprisoned from 2020 to 2025, in exile since 2025)
- Illia Salei (Note: Imprisoned from 2020 to 2021, in exile since 2021)
- Tadevuš Kandrusievič (Note: Former Archbishop of Minsk from 2007 to 2021, not allowed to enter Belarus in 2020)
- Andrei Zeltser †
- Alexander Taraikovsky †
- Mark Bernstein (Note: Imprisoned since 2022)
- Slavamir Adamovich (Note: Imprisoned from 1996 to 1997, considered the first persecuted opposition figure)
- Youras Ziankovich (Note: Imprisoned from 2021 to 2025)
- Marfa Rabkova (Note: Imprisoned since 2020)
- Siarhiej Dubaviec (Note: In exile since 2010)
- Ludmila Hraznova (Note: Arrested in 1999, 2002 and 2003)
- Katsiaryna Barysevich (Note: Imprisoned from 2020 to 2021)
- Raman Bandarenka †
- Vadzim Sarančukoŭ (Note: In exile since 2021)
- Marina Zolotova (Note: Imprisoned from 2018 to 2019 and from 2021 to 2025, in exile since 2025)
- Viktar Ivaškievič † (Note: Opposed to both Soviet Belarus and Lukashenko)
- Dzianis Ivashyn (Note: Imprisoned since 2021)
- Mikhail Marynich (Note: Former Chairman of the Minsk City Executive Committee (Mayor of Minsk) from 1990 to 1991, imprisoned from 2004 to 2006) †
- Siarhei Navumchyk (Note: Vice President of the Rada of the Belarusian Democratic Republic in exile since 1997)
- Lyavon Barshchewski
- Alaksiej Janukievich
- Syamyon Sharetski (Note: Former Acting President in 1999, in exile since 1999)
- Vyacheslav Siuchyk (Note: Arrested in 1996)
- Yury Khadyka (Note: Arrested in 1996 and 2002)
- Siamion Domash † (Note: Deputy for the Belarusian Parliament from 1990 to 1996)
- Ales Michalevic (Note: Imprisoned in 2011 and again from 2015 to 2016, in exile from 2011 to 2015)
- Siarhiey Antončyk (Note: Opposed to both Soviet Belarus and Lukashenko, arrested in 2011, 2004, 2005 and 2006, fined in 2019 and 2021)
- Maryja Alijeva † (Note: Opposed to both Soviet Belarus and Lukashenko, arrested in 2020)
- Tsimafei Dranchuk (Note: Imprisoned in 2006)
- Lavon Volski
- Tadeusz Gawin
- Viera Cierliukievič † (Note: Opposed to both Soviet Belarus and Lukashenko)
- Volha Sitnik (Note: Imprisoned since 2025)
- Ihar Hermianchuk †
- Gennady Grushevoy †
- Alina Koushyk
- Pavel Barkouski (Note: Ine exile since 2020)
- Uładzimir Arłou
- Dzmitry Wus (Note: Imprisoned from 2011 to 2017)
- Sergey Kalyakin †
- Piatro Sadoŭski (Note: Opposed to both Soviet Belarus and Lukahenko)
- Ryhor Kastusioŭ (Note: Arrested in 2021, imprisoned from 2022 to 2024)
- Roman Protasevich (Note: In exile from 2019 to 2021, imprisoned from 2021 to 2023)
- Stsiapan Putsila (Note: In exile since 2020)
- Sergei Dylevsky (Note: In exile since 2020)
- Ihar Losik (Note: Imprisoned in 2020, on exile since 2025)
- Vitold Ashurak † (Note: Imprisoned in 2020, died incarcerated)
- Olga Kovalkova (Note: In exile since 2020)
- Liliya Vlasova (Note: Arrested in 2020)
- Ivan Kravtsov (Note: In exile since 2020)
- Nadzeya Astapchuk
- Alexander Dabravolski (Note: In exile since 2020)
- Andrei Kureichik (Note: In exile since 2020)
- Vital Rymasheuski
- Uladzimir Tsesler (Note: In exile since 2020)
- Mikalai Khalezin (Note: In exile since 2021)
- Natalia Kaliada
- Franak Viačorka (Note: In exile since 2020)
- Vincuk Viačorka
- Vladimir Novosiad
- Siarhei Cherachen
- Jaroslav Romanchuk (Note: In exile since 2021)
- Yury Zacharanka †? (Note: Former Minister of Internal Affairs from 1994 to 1995, disappeared in 1999)
- Viktar Hanchar †? (Note: Former Deputy Prime Minister in 1994 and Chairman of the Central Election Commission of Belarus in 1995, disappeared in 1999)
- Hienadź Karpienka † (Note: Former Deputy Chairman of the House of Representatives from 1996 to 1999)
- Mikhail Chigir (Note: Former Prime Minister, arrested in 1999)
- Eduard Lobau † (Note: Killed in Ukraine)
- Nasta Palazhanka
- Alyaksandr Kazulin (Note: Imprisoned from 2006 to 2008)
- Tatsyana Karatkyevich (Note: Arrested in 2024)
- Aleh Trusaŭ
- Ihar Alinevich (Note: Arrested in 2010 and, imprisoned from 2011 to 2015 and since 2021)
- Mikola Dziadok (Note: Arrested in 2010, 2017, 2018, 2019 and 2020, imprisoned from 2011 to 2015 and from 2021 to 2025, on exile since 2025)
- Aleh Byabenin †
- Natalya Radina (Note: Imprisoned from 2010 to 2011, in exile since 2011)
- Pavel Sheremet †
- Andrei Dimitriyeu (Note: Arrested in 2021, imprisoned since 2023)
- Alexander Otroschenkov (Note: Arrested in 2001 and 2002, imprisoned from 2010 to 2011)
- Dzmitry Zavadski †? (Note: Former personal cameraman of Alexander Lukashenko from 1994 to 1997, disappeared in 2000, declared dead in 2003)
- Anatol Krasouski †? (Note: Disappeared in 1999)
- Sergey Androsenko (Note: Imprisoned and in exile)

== Opposition leadership ==
Year	Leader	Political party	Event/Election	Position
1988-1991	Zianon Pazniak	Belarusian Popular Front	1990 Byelorussian Supreme Soviet election, April Strikes, August Coup	Deputy to the Supreme Council of the Republic of Belarus (1990-1995)
1991-1994	Democracy			
1994-1996	Zianon Pazniak	Belarusian Popular Front	Belarusian Spring	Deputy to the Supreme Council of the Republic of Belarus (1990-1995)
1995-1996	Myechyslaw Hryb	Independent	1995 Belarusian parliamentary election, 1995–1996 Belarusian constitutional crisis	Chairman to the Supreme Council of the Republic of Belarus (1995-1996)
1996	Syamyon Sharetski	Independent	1995–1996 Belarusian constitutional crisis	Chairman of the Supreme Council of the Republic of Belarus (1996)
1996-1998	Vasil Bykaŭ	Independent	Belarusian Spring	—
1998-2001	Ales Bialiatski	Belarusian Popular Front	Freedom March	—
2001	Uładzimir Hančaryk	Independent	2001 presidential elections	Presidential candidate
2001-2003	Ales Bialiatski	Belarusian Popular Front	—	—
2003-2006	Without defined leadership			—
2006	Alaksandar Milinkievič	United Democratic Forces of Belarus	2006 presidential elections, Jeans Revolution	Presidential candidate
2006-2010	Without defined leadership			—
2010	Andrei Sannikov	Independent	2010 presidential elections, 2010 Belarusian protests	Presidential candidate
2010-2015	Without defined leadership		2011 Belarusian protests, Teddybear Airdrop Minsk 2012	—
2015	Tatsyana Karatkyevich	Belarusian Social Democratic Party (Assembly)	2015 presidential elections	Presidential candidate
2015-2019	Mikola Statkevich	Belarusian Social Democratic Party (People's Assembly)	2017 Belarusian protests	—
2019-2020	Sergei Tikhanovsky	Independent	2019 Belarusian anti-Russian protests, 2020 presidential elections, 2020-2021 Belarusian protests	Presidential candidate, arrested
2020-2021	Sviatlana Tsikhanouskaya	Independent	2020 presidential elections, 2020-2021 Belarusian protests, Belarusian partisan movement (2020-present)	Presidential candidate, Sergei Tikhanovsky's wife, Chairman of the United Transitional Cabinet and President of the Coordination Council (2020—present)
2021–present	Without defined leadership (Sviatlana Tsikhanouskaya in exile)		2025 presidential elections	—

== International support ==
=== Organizations ===
- The European Union has enforced sanctions against Lukashenko's government.
- The NATO imposed sanctions against the Lukashenko administration.

=== Governments ===
The following governments have given diplomatic support to the Belarusian democracy movement:

- United States
- Czech Republic
- Slovakia
- Estonia
- Latvia
- Lithuania
- Poland
- Moldova
- Ukraine

=== Other movements ===
- Russian opposition has elements sympathetic to the actions of the Belarusian dissidents, like Khabarovsk Krai protesters. Some anti-Putin groups (e.g. Russia of the Future) called for stopping support for so-called rogue states, including Belarus under Lukashenko, which favors Belarusian opposition.

=== People ===
- Actors Kevin Spacey, Jude Law, Roger Lloyd-Pack and playwright Sir Tom Stoppard joined street protests in London against Lukashenko's government in 2011.
- Since 2006, In Solidarity in Belarus festivals take place, which were initially organized in Warsaw, Poland (from 2006 to 2010) and included Polish actors like Borys Szyc, Zbigniew Zamachowski and Daniel Olbrychski, after which (since 2011) became international.

== In art ==
Viva Belarus! - the most famous film about the political regime of Alexander Lukashenko, human rights in Belarus during his rule, and the opposition in the country. It also depicts the protests of 2010.

A Lesson of Belarusian - Polish documentary film about the disputed 2006 presidential election.

Kalinovski Square - 2007 documentary film.

== See also ==
- Russian opposition
- Iranian opposition
- Kazakh opposition
- Belarusian partisan movement (2020–present)
- Kastuś Kalinoŭski Regiment
- New Belarus passport project
