= Ruslan Sidiki =

Russian-Italian anarchist

Ruslan Sidiki (born 16 March 1988) is a Russian-Italian anarchist who, in November 2023, conducted a drone strike on a military base in Dyagilevo air base in Ryazan Oblast, as well as derailing a freight train.

Sidiki was arrested on charges of terrorism, with Russian prosecutors alleging collusion with Ukrainian military intelligence. While Sidiki does not deny committing the acts, he denies they are terrorist acts (as his targets were military and not civilian) and denied being briefed by Ukrainian intelligence. He also alleged his confession was extracted under torture. In letters published by Mediazona, Sidiki describes discussing a possible attack on the airbase with a "Ukrainian comrade", as well as travelling to Latvia to prepare for their attack. Following his arrest, he was put on Russia's list of extremists and terrorists.

On 23 May 2025 he was sentenced to 29 years of imprisonment for sabotage. This will be 9 years in prison and 20 years in a strict-regimen corrective colony.

== See also ==
- Anarchism in Russia
- Rail war in Russia (2022–present)
