= Rail sabotage =

Railway accident caused by sabotage

A film from Camp Claiborne from March 8, 9 and 10, 1944 of derailment tests done on the Claiborne-Polk Military Railroad. The tests were done to better train allied personnel in acts of rail sabotage during World War 2.

Rail sabotage (colloquially known as wrecking) is the act of disrupting a rail transport network. This includes both acts designed only to hinder or delay as well as acts designed to actually destroy a train. Railway sabotage requires considerable effort, due to the design and heavy weight of railways.

Sabotage must be distinguished from more blatant methods of disruption (e.g., blowing up a train, train robbery).

== Methods ==
=== Relay cabinet arson ===
In 2022, setting fire to rail relay cabinets that control track operations was a common method of sabotage during the 2022 Russian invasion of Ukraine.

=== Damage to infrastructure ===
Notable instances

- 1861: East Tennessee bridge burnings – Union sympathizers destroyed nine railroad bridges in East Tennessee, on the orders of President Lincoln. The bridges were quickly rebuilt.
- 1864: John Yates Beall, a Confederate Navy officer, was discovered plotting to derail a Union passenger train and executed the following year.
- 1880: Ned Kelly and his gang of bushrangers in Australia had railway tracks torn up to derail a police special train. The police were tipped off about the plot and later engaged the Kelly gang in a shootout, with Ned Kelly emerging as the only survivor.
- 1905: 20th Century Limited derailment - Although unconfirmed, the evidence pointed heavily to malicious involvement in the derailment of the New York Central Railroad's crack passenger train, the 20th Century Limited, resulting in 21 deaths.
- 1915: Vanceboro bridge bombing – the Saint Croix–Vanceboro Railway Bridge (over the U.S.–Canada border) was bombed by German saboteurs, although the bridge was not fully destroyed and was quickly rebuilt.
- 1939: 1939 City of San Francisco derailment
- 1942: Thamshavn Line sabotage – the transformer station for Norway's Thamshavn Line (an electric railroad) was blown up by Norwegian saboteurs during the German occupation.
- 1951: Huntly rail bridge bombing – a rail bridge near Mahuta, three miles from Huntly, New Zealand, was severely damaged by dynamite charges during an industrial dispute. The sabotage was discovered after the bridge rocked noticeably as a slow moving morning passenger train came to rest across the bridge after braking for, and striking aside, warning sleepers laid across the track. Police believed it was an attempt to intimidate open-cast mine-workers who were not on strike.
- 1995: Palo Verde derailment – a train in Palo Verde, Arizona, was derailed by saboteurs shifting the rails out of position, causing one fatality. The case remains unsolved.
- 2002: Jaunpur train crash – a rail was broken and caused a train to derail, killing twelve people. An Islamic extremist organization was blamed.
- 2002: Rafiganj train wreck – a train derailed on a bridge over a river in Bihar, India, killing at least 130 people. A Maoist terrorist organization was blamed.
- 2022–2023: Belarusian Rail War and the Russian Rail War - rail sabotage campaigns carried out by Belarusian and Russian opposition and paramilitary groups opposed to the Russian invasion of Ukraine.

=== Intentional switch misalignments ===
- 1982: An NJDOT commuter train crashes into a pasta factory in Fair Lawn, New Jersey, killing the engineer. Four youths who tampered with the switch were charged.
- 2024: On April 22nd, a BNSF coal train derailed and collided with a freight car on a siding in Bennett, Nebraska, after a switch was intentionally misaligned by a teenager who proceeded to film the accident.

== Motivations ==
=== Vandalism ===
- Greenock rail crash was caused by vandals.

=== Internet clout ===
- The April 2024 Bennet, Nebraska rail incident was caused by a teenager intentionally misaligning the switch and filming the crash.

=== Extortion ===
- Klaus-Peter Sabotta sabotaged trains and attempted to extort money to prevent sabotaging more.

=== Terrorism ===
- Both ISIL and Al-Qaeda have advocated for rail sabotage and have published detailed instructions for how to commit such acts.
- Rafiganj train wreck
- 2001 Angola train attack
- There have been 41 rail sabotage incidents in Washington state since 2021, thought to be ecotage.

=== Military or resistance ===
- Operation Washing

Simple Sabotage Field Manual published by OSS during World War 2 describes tactics for rail sabotage

== In popular culture ==
- The Invisible Man (1933 film)
- The Wrecker (1929 film)

== See also ==
- Rail War
- Railway sabotage during World War II
- Stop the Wagons
- Sherman's neckties
- Railroad plough
