= 1991 Belarusian strikes =

1991 general strike and protests in Belarus, Soviet Union

- Part of the Belarusian democracy movement and the Dissolution of the Soviet Union
- Date: 3 – 25 April 1991 (3 weeks and 1 day)
- Location: Byelorussian Soviet Socialist Republic, Soviet Union
- Caused by: Price increases; Approval of the 1991 Soviet Union referendum
- Goals: Wage increases; Restoration of lower prices; Cancellation of the 5% tax on goods sold outside Belarus; End of Communist Party committees within businesses; Resignation of President Mikhail Gorbachev and the Council of Ministers of the Soviet Union; New elections to the Supreme Soviet of the Byelorussian Soviet Socialist Republic; Primacy of the Declaration of State Sovereignty of the Byelorussian Soviet Socialist Republic
- Methods: General strike
- Result: Wages increased; Price increases rolled back; 5% tax cancelled

Parties
| Striking workers; (Belarus) Belarusian Popular Front | Soviet Union; Byelorussian Soviet Socialist Republic |

Lead figures
| (Belarus) Maryja Alijeva; (Belarus) Sergei Antonchik; (Belarus) Viktar Ivaškievič; (Belarus) Zianon Pazniak; (Belarus) Vasil Bykaŭ; (Belarus) Ales Adamovich | (Soviet Union) Mikhail Gorbachev; (Byelorussian Soviet Socialist Republic) Anatoly Malofeyev; (Byelorussian Soviet Socialist Republic) Nikolai Dementey; (Byelorussian Soviet Socialist Republic) Stanislav Shushkevich; (Byelorussian Soviet Socialist Republic) Vyacheslav Kebich; (Byelorussian Soviet Socialist Republic) Eduard Shirkovsky |

The 1991 Belarusian strikes, also referred to in Belarus as the April Strikes (Belarusian: Красавіцкія забастоўкі, romanized: Krasavickija zabastoŭki), were a series of nationwide strikes and rallies in the Byelorussian Soviet Socialist Republic (modern-day Belarus). Originally in opposition to price increases and a tax on goods from republics sold in another republic (which heavily affected the export-based Belarusian economy), the protests later turned into a broadly anti-Soviet movement, calling for the resignation of Soviet leadership, a reduction of the economic role of the Soviet government, and fresh elections to the Supreme Soviet of the Byelorussian Soviet Socialist Republic.

== Background ==
Under the rule of Pyotr Masherov, the Byelorussian Soviet Socialist Republic had evolved rapidly from agrarianism into industrialism. By 1991, Belarus was producing goods such as tractors, automobiles and computers. However, the economic downturn faced by the Soviet Union meant that there was a decreased demand for such goods, causing massive layoffs.

Further worsening matters were the effects of the Chernobyl disaster on the Belarusian economy. One quarter of Belarusian forests were contaminated by radiation, leading to the evacuation of 137,700 people and the voluntary relocation of an additional 200,000. 479 settlements were abandoned, and in July 1990 the entire republic was declared to be an ecological disaster area. Damages are estimated as having reached $235 billion, 32 times the budget of the Byelorussian SSR in 1985. Against the backdrop of these economic crises, the Belarusian national revival began to emerge in the late 1980s and early 1990s.

== Prelude ==
On 19 March 1991, the Cabinet of Ministers of the Soviet Union issued a decree titled "On the reform of retail prices and social protection of the population" (Russian: О реформе розничных цен и социальной защите населения, romanized: O reforme roznichnykh tsen i sotsialnoy zashchite naselennya) in an effort to resolve the budget deficit caused by the economic crisis. The decree was part of the 1991 Soviet monetary reform. As a result of the decree, prices increased by 2 to five times, in some cases even further.

Another Soviet economic measure which exacerbated tensions was the so-called "Gorbachev tax", a 5% tax on goods sold in one republic which were made in another. With the Byelorussian SSR having a focus on goods which were exported to other republics, it bore the burden of the "Gorbachev tax" more than any other, save for the Russian Soviet Federative Socialist Republic.

== Strikes ==
on 3 April 1991, workers at the Minsk Electromechanical Plant walked out on the job and began protesting on Daŭhrabrodskaja Street. Over the course of the day, the crowd grew to 50,000, as other factory workers joined the protest, and the group marched from Daŭhrabrodskaja Street to the Government House.

In the days that followed, more industries and cities joined the strike. By the week's end, workers from 98 industries had formed a "strike committee," supported by the anti-Soviet Belarusian Popular Front. At the same time, the demands quickly morphed from economic to political. The strikers called for the withdrawal of party committees from enterprises, the resignation of Mikhail Gorbachev and the Cabinet of Ministers, fresh elections for the Supreme Soviet of the Byelorussian Soviet Socialist Republic, and the establishment of the Declaration of State Sovereignty of the Byelorussian Soviet Socialist Republic as a constitutional document.

Opposition leaders and authors Vasil Bykaŭ and Ales Adamovich publicly expressed their support for the strikes, with the former writing in the BPF's newspaper, "I warmly congratulate the working class of Minsk, which so heroically shows its working solidarity in achieving the nation's goals, in the struggle for bread, democracy and publicity. Only your uncompromising struggle can lead to national victory over the predatory measures of the centre and the local party bureaucracy. I wish you unshakable firmness and great determination. God help you! Belarus lives!" In addition to the Belarusian Popular Front were independent deputies, among them Alexander Lukashenko, who called on the government to accept the workers' demands.

Opposed to the strikes was the Presidium of the Supreme Soviet of the Byelorussian SSR, a group of 25 people led by chairman Nikolai Dementey and first deputy chairman Stanislav Shushkevich. Vyacheslav Kebich, Chairman of the Council of Ministers, was additionally opposed to the strikes, though took a much more conciliatory line than the Soviet central government and worked to reduce prices. However, by the time the government did so, the main demands of the strikers had evolved into political ones.

Shushkevich claimed in an address to the protesters that the government was working to bring their demands to fruition, saying, "In truth, we have no dispute that the political questions you raised should be considered. But there is a certain pace. A big wagon cannot be sped up quickly... It is impossible to gather deputies for a session in a few days - in this case, they will have to speed up our Presidium as if the session had not been prepared." However, when BPF deputy Siarhiey Antončyk proposed to vote on convening a session of the Supreme Soviet, Shushkevich refused.

The day after Antončyk's proposal, Shushkevich declared a closed meeting of the Presidium of the Supreme Soviet. Ordinary deputies were not permitted to attend, in violation of the Temporary Regulations of the Supreme Soviet, the rules of the Supreme Soviet's functions. Piatro Sadoŭski, a BPF member of the presidium, unsuccessfully attempted to bring about the convocation of a new session. The next day, Shushkevich appeared with Mikhail Myasnikovich, first deputy chairman of the Council of Ministers, on television, where he spoke in opposition to the demands of the strikers.

== End of the strikes ==
In addition to the strikes in Minsk, a strike by railway workers in the northern city of Orsha had a crippling effect on the Soviet economy. Trains into the Russian SFSR, including from Moscow to Paris, from Leningrad to Odesa, and from Minsk to Smolensk, did not function as a result of the strikes, leading to an intervention by OMON riot police on the evening of 25 April 1991. As a result, the strikers were dispersed, bringing an end to the strike and a beginning to negotiations. It was eventually determined to accept the economic demands of the strikes, while refusing subsequent political demands.

Despite the strikes' end, workers at potash plants in Salihorsk continued to strike for a month after the end of strikes in Orsha, and resumed strikes in August 1991.

== See also ==
- Minsk Spring
- 2010 Belarusian protests
- 2020–2021 Belarusian protests
