= Viera Cierliukievič =

Soviet-Belarusian trade unionist and politician

Vera Cierlukevič
- Верa Церлюкевіч
- Born: 13 October 1941; Novy Barok, Mahilioŭ region, Belarus
- Died: 31 December 2000 (aged 59); Minsk, Belarus
- Political party: Conservative Christian Party - BPF

Viera Cierliukievič (Belarusian: Верa Церлюкевіч, also known as Vera Tserlukevich; 13 October 1941 – 31 December 2000) was one of the most prominent Belarusian female political and trade union activists in the 1990s, identified among “heroic women in the history of Belarus”.

Cierliukievič was born in the village of Novy Barok in Mahilioŭ region, Belarus. The village was abandoned as a result of the Chernobyl Nuclear Disaster.

She was a factory worker at the Minsk Tractor Works. During the anti-Soviet strikes of 1991, which “went down in [Belarusian] history as the most massive demonstration of workers in the struggle for their political rights”, Cierliukievič became one of the leaders of a protest movement at her place of work.

Cierliukievič came to nationwide prominence at a rally at the main square of Minsk on 21 August 1991, the last day of the anti-Gorbachev August Coup. The event was organized by the Belarusian Popular Front to protest against attempts to take control of the country by reactionary Communist leaders and reverse democratic reforms. Cierliukievič addressed the protesters alongside key opposition leaders such as Zianon Pazniak, Piatro Sadoŭski, Siarhiej Antončyk and underlined the important role of workers in the democracy movement.

In the second half of the 1990s, she actively participated in numerous protest actions against the regime of President Lukashenka. As a result, she lost her job and endured a number of arrests and police brutality.

She belonged to the Conservative Christian Party of the Belarusian People's Front.

Cierliukievič died in Minsk on 31 December 2000 after a battle with cancer.

She was listed as one of five “heroic women of different periods of Belarusian history” by a famous Belarusian historian Uladzimir Arlou.
