= Busly liaciać =

Belarusian opposition movement

Busły liaciać
- Буслы ляцяць
- Founded: 13 November 2020
- Country: Belarus
- Allegiance: Belarusian opposition
- Ideology: Anti-Lukashenko
- Status: Active
- Website: Telegram channel

Busły laciać (Belarusian: Буслы ляцяць, lit. 'The storks are flying') is a Belarusian opposition resistance group. It was founded on 13 November, 2020, to fight against the government of Alexander Lukashenko. The group is part of the "Supraciŭ" association, alongside the Cyber Partisans.

== Overview ==
Busły liaciać's activities range from harmless acts like street art and flash mobs to minor sabotage. The "Busły" have claimed responsibility for destroying dozens of CCTV cameras, damaging security forces' vehicles and property, and blocking railways.

One notable action attributed to them was an attack on the Minsk OMON base in late September 2021. The "Busły" reportedly used a drone to drop two 5-liter containers of incendiary mixture onto the riot police base in Uručča during the night. The group claims that the attack caused loud pops and flashes, waking people in nearby houses. They also released a video from the drone documenting the incident.

The Ministry of Internal Affairs did not initially comment on the attack on the OMON base. However, in October 2021, the Prosecutor General's Office indirectly confirmed the fact of the attack, acknowledging that there had been "an act of terrorism using UAVs" in September 2021.

In October 2021, the Ministry of Internal Affairs of Belarus recognized the "Busły liaciać" Telegram channel and chat as extremist formations, warning that subscribing to or actively participating in them would result in criminal liability.

On December 1, 2021, the Supreme Court of the Republic of Belarus classified "Supraciŭ" and its member initiatives, including the "Cyber Partisans," "DNS," and "Busły liaciać," as terrorist organizations, banning them in Belarus.

A representative of the prosecutor's office stated that, "since the spring of 2021, these groups had been using Telegram channels and chats to discuss, plan, and promote terrorist acts, viz. arson and the explosion of buildings and vehicles."

Since the onset of the 2022 Russian invasion of Ukraine, the movement has carried out acts of sabotage on both Belarusian and Russian railways. In September 2022, several participants of the movement were sentenced to long prison terms.

== See also ==
- Cyber Partisans
- Community of Railway Workers of Belarus
