= Declaration of State Sovereignty of the Byelorussian Soviet Socialist Republic =

The Declaration of State Sovereignty of the Byelorussian Soviet Socialist Republic was a formal document issued by the Supreme Soviet of Belarus to assert its independence from the Soviet Union. Passed on July 27, 1990, the declaration started the process of Belarus' eventual independence on August 25, 1991.

It effectively renamed the Byelorussian SSR to the Republic of Belarus and established the basis for all state symbols, such as the national flag and coat of arms, the national anthem, and the national colors. It also defined the national currency, military, and language. On August 25, 1991, the declaration was granted status of constitutional act.

Until 1996, July 27 was celebrated as Independence Day in Belarus.

== See also ==
- Declaration of State Sovereignty of the Russian Soviet Federative Socialist Republic
- Declaration of State Sovereignty of Ukraine
- Declaration of State Sovereignty of Armenia
