= Killing of Gennady Shutov =

Protester killed in 2020 Belarusian protests

Hienadz Shutau
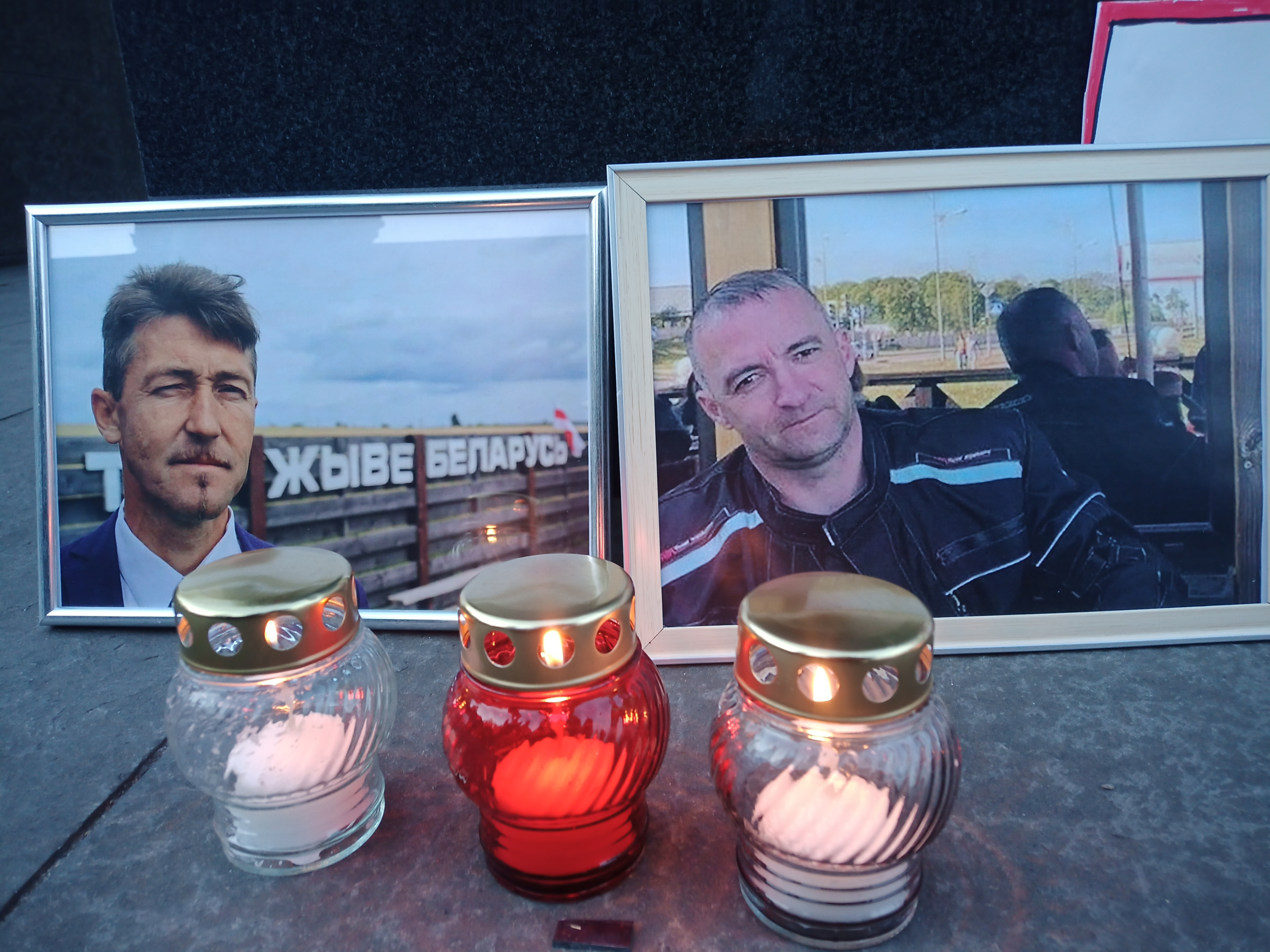
- Born: 25 November 1975
- Died: 19 August 2020 (aged 44); Minsk, Belarus

Hienadz Shutau (Belarusian: Генадзь Шутаў, Russian: Геннадий Шутов; 25 November 1975 – 19 August 2020, Minsk) was a participant in protests against fraud in the 2020 Belarusian presidential election. He is the third officially recognized victim of the 9–12 August 2020 crackdown and the first from a firearm.

== Death ==
According to the Militsiya, on the evening of August 11, 2020, Hienadz Shutau and another man attacked police officers in Brest near the Moskovsky district administration, beat them with a metal pipe, and tried to take away their weapons. One of the militiamen, fearing for his life, shot the attacker in the shoulder, but because of his resistance "accidentally wounded him in the head". The wounded man was taken to a hospital. On August 13, 2020, he was transferred to the hospital of the Ministry of Defense in critical condition, where he died on August 19, 2020, at 10:20. Investigators promise to give a "legal assessment" of the actions of the attackers and the legality of the use of weapons.

Shutau's daughter Anastasia told the media another version, "He called that he was going home, and since then we have been looking for him for two days and could not find him. His phone was unavailable... The father was shot from behind at close range, the shooter was behind him. There were very severe brain damage, intense bleeding, broken apart bones."

A woman who lives near the murder site said she heard three shots and went out onto the balcony, where she saw a man lying in a pool of blood and a young man in civilian clothes walking away from him. "He went up to him, tried to kick him, but when he saw blood, he started to panic, he called his guys. One of them ran up and began to hold his head, neck, apparently to stop bleeding. And this young man, who was shooting, went up to the bench and called an ambulance. He was very tense, nervous, even shouted. People here tried to approach him, but he would not let them. He swore at them. Then other guys came here, I think they were his people because he would not let others. Then an ambulance was called for the second time so that it could arrive faster. It is possible that the ambulance found out how the gunshot wound occurred. In the end, he said that he was attacked and it was in self-defense. At this time, people came up and began to photograph him. He began to hide behind his shirt, took out a pistol and began to direct the weapon at people, sending them away. People reacted quite aggressively to this. And that's understandable." The witness also noted that the shot was fired in the back of the head since the man was lying face down on the ground.

The certificate on the death of Shutau says that it was caused by traumatic cerebral edema. In the column "external cause of death", the code Y22 is indicated − in the international classification of diseases, it stands for "injury as a result of a shot from a handgun with undetermined intentions". On September 21, a video from a camera at the entrance of house 334 on Moskovskaya Street in Brest, under the windows of which on August 11 one of the "tihars" in civilian clothes shot Hienadz Shutau in the back of the head, was published by MediaZona. This recording confirms that the official version of the Investigative Committee that the biker and his friend, with metal pipes in their hands, attacked the police and tried to take away their weapons, is fake. In the hands of Shutau and his friend Kardziukou, there were no fittings or metal pipes, and there were no warning shots upward from the security forces either. They also did not attack the "tihars", but they themselves approached them.

On October 6, at a meeting with Brest State Technical University students, the prosecutor of the Brest Region Viktor Klimov refused to share the results of the investigation, citing the secrecy of the inquest. As the newspaper "Brestskaya Gazeta" wrote, Aliaksandr Kardziukou, the only witness of the murder of Shutau, was detained on August 13 and has not been in contact since then.

At the end of the first decade of November 2020, the relatives of the murdered man received a response from the Investigative Committee of Belarus that there are "no grounds" for opening a criminal case upon the murder.

As of December, 28, 2020, no criminal case was opened on the killing of Shutau itself, while the Investigative Committee has still not closed the case against Shutau on resistance to law enforcement officers. At the same time, Aliaksandr Kardziukou, the witness of the murder of Shutau that was arrested and initially accused of resistance to a police officer, became accused of attempted murder. Why the article was changed was not explained but Kardziukou's sister thought that it could be made to fully acquit those who fired.

=== Court ===
On February 2, 2021, it became known that Aliaksandr Kardziukou would be charged with attempted murder, while a criminal case on the murder of Henads Schutau was not underway.

In the Kardziukou's court session on February 16, 2021, it turned out that on August 11, 2020, on Moskovskaya Street in Brest, a serviceman of the 5th Spetsnaz Brigade, Captain Roman Gavrilov, who was in civilian clothes and carried a Makarov pistol, shot at the back of Shutau's head.

On February 25, 2021, the Brest Regional Court (judge Svetlana Kremenovskaya) found Shutau guilty of resistance with the use of violence, Kardziukou was found guilty of attempted murder by her on top of that. The killed Shutau was returned a guilty verdict without sentencing, while Kardziukou was sentenced to 10 years in a strengthened regime penitentiary, as requested by the state prosecutor Gennady Bury. The victims were named servicemen of the 5th Spetsnaz Brigade Roman Gavrilov and Praporshchik Arseniy Golitsyn, who fired at both to kill.

Close relatives of Shutau and Kardziukou called the verdict absurd and questioned the honesty of the trial. Brest human rights activist Raman Kislyak echoed them, calling the court "a screen of punitive tasks" because it did not meet the criteria of impartiality and independence, and the case itself was conducted for the sake of protecting the servicemen from a fair trial.

On May 14, 2021, the Supreme Court of Belarus upheld the earlier judgments on the murdered Shutau and Kardziukou. According to Raman Kislyak, the Supreme Court failed to meet the criterion of independence when examining the appeal too, as the entire hearing was intended to exempt the military officers from punishment for murder and use of weapons.

== Funeral ==
On August 20, 2020, the daughter of the perished reported that her father's body had not been returned to relatives, so the date of the funeral was still unknown. The relatives wanted to bury Hienadz Shutau in Zhabinka since his mother lived there. He was buried there on August 24.

== Personal life ==
Hienadz Shutau was married, had five children and one grandchild.

== Reactions ==
On September 17, 2020, the European Parliament, in a resolution approved by an absolute majority of MPs, called for an "independent and effective investigation" of the death of Hienadz Shutau related to the protests.

On November 19, 2020, residents of Brest recorded a video message in connection with the escalation of violence in Belarus, among other things, draw the attention of the authorities to the need to investigate the murder of Hienadz Shutau so that the perpetrators would be punished in accordance with the law. On November 26, 2020, the European Parliament, in a resolution approved by an absolute majority of MPs, called for a "prompt, thorough, impartial, and independent investigation" into the killings during protests in Belarus, including Hienadz Shutau, thus supported the initiative of Brest residents.

On February 25, 2021, Sviatlana Tsikhanouskaya weighed in on the court decision taking the side of the media and activists that thought that charges were trumped up as part of a crackdown to keep President Alexander Lukashenko in power, "A peaceful protester Henadz Shutau was shot dead by siloviki (security forces) in plain clothes last Aug. His friend Aliaksandr Kardziukou witnessed it and ran away. Today, a court sentenced Kardziukou to 10 years in prison. Murdered Shutau was called guilty, and his murderer was called a victim."

Aksana Kolb, editor-in-chief of Novy Chas, wrote, "Aliaksandr Kardziukou, a friend of Hienadz Shutau who witnessed the murder, got ten years. Moreover, Hienadz himself was found guilty. It is a pity that they have not yet learned how to throw the dead ones behind bars...." "The victim was turned into a criminal," human rights activist Ales Bialiatski commented on the verdict.

=== Viasna Human Rights Centre ===
On May 6, 2021, experts and analysts of the Viasna Human Rights Centre published a conclusion on the criminal case of Hienadz Shutau and Aliaksandr Kardziukou. Viasna's lawyers concluded that by bringing in the Special Forces of Belarus to suppress the protests, there were violations of the law (Article 3 of the Law "On the Armed Forces of the Republic of Belarus", Articles 16 and 17 of the Law "On the State of Emergency" in particular), while the secret unpublished decree of the President of the Republic of Belarus No. 99-c "On Approval of the Regulations on the State System of Response to Acts of Terrorism, Activities of Terrorist Organizations, Illegal Armed Formations and Mass Riots" "cannot be important for assessing the legitimacy of mutual actions of citizens and military personnel and cannot be the basis for imposing duties on citizens or restricting their rights." The experts also referred to their previous statements, according to which there were no riots in Belarus after the presidential elections in August 2020, but predominantly peaceful protests, the participants of which were unjustifiably subjected to ill-treatment and torture, took place; there were no regimes of martial law or a state of emergency, there was not an armed conflict, either.

According to the Viasna experts, the illegality and groundlessness of the verdict are based on the Aliaksandr Kardziukou’s absence of intent to kill, since “even by the verdict passed, the fact that Kardziukou hit the victim Gavrilov with a pipe on the head is not enough to come to a conclusion about the intention to kill the victim,” while there were no other pieces of evidence that Kardziukou wanted to kill Gavrilov, which excludes the conclusion of direct intent (besides, there can be no attempted murder with indirect intent), as well as on the absence of convincing shreds of evidence of a blow to the head of the victim Roman Gavrilov because three other versions of his injuries at another time and in other circumstances were documented, which were biasedly assessed by the court in violation of the presumption of innocence of Kardziukou. The direct interest of Roman Gavrilov and Arseniy Golitsyn (after investigating whose actions the Investigative Committee refused to initiate a criminal case in connection with causing the death of Hienadz Shutau) in the outcome of the trial could lead to the manipulation of evidence “to substantiate the legality of Gavrilov’s actions, who, from various options to counteract Shutau’s resistance, chose a shot in his torso with a hit in the back of the head, and Golitsyn, who with a warning shot from a pistol endangered the life and health of people in the apartment, where a bullet hit the ceiling, breaking through the glass.”

Gavrilov’s defense of the legality of his actions was based on the fact that his shot in the back of Shutau’s head was preceded by an unexpected blow to the head by Kardziukou, which made it impossible for him to overcome Shutau’s resistance (who, according to Gavrilov, hugged his legs, but, according to Kardziukou, was on his knees with raised hands back to Gavrilov). At the same time, Gavrilov’s injuries approximately corresponded to the circumstance of using the pipe shown by Kardziukou: after falling from the bench, which Kardziukou connected with the actions of Gavrilov and Golitsyn, he hit one of them with a pipe in the thigh, so that the scratch on Gavrilov’s left forearm which was placed at the level of the hips when the person's hands are lowered could be the result of blocking the blow to the thigh with the hand. In addition, Golitsyn concealed his fall during the pursuit of Kardziukou during the preliminary investigation, and the soldier’s bodily injuries found, according to the forensic expert, could have occurred when falling from a height of his own height, but Golitsyn argued that Kardziukou caused him damage by throwing a pipe what allowed him to become a victim too to justify the shooting in peacetime.

According to Article 23 of the Law of the Republic of Belarus "On the Status of Servicemen,” servicemen are obliged to "always be in uniform, clean and neatly dressed", while Gavrilov and Golitsyn were of athletic build with belt bags in civilian clothes and caps, stuck together, and just a single look at them at the intersection, according to the court, allowed Shutau and Kardziukou to understand that they were "not just citizens present but on duty to protect public order" to qualify a crime. But the fact that Gavrilov and Golitsyn themselves mimicked protesters by clapping their hands, running away when the Militsiya was approaching, and such, according to the Viasna experts, could not allow them to be identified as special subjects of the crime. In addition, the court did not indicate in its decision that the shouts of the victims “Face down, bastards, I’ll murder you!”, “Lie face down on the floor, minger”, shooting in the air, the ceiling of the kitchen of the neighboring house, and the back of Shutau's head were called upon to strengthen such confidence. Kardziukou assured that he hit Gavrilov on the thigh not in connection with caring out duties to protect public order by him but instinctively, because “he received a blow (or thought that he received a blow)” from the latter. In addition, the victims did not present any claims for violation of public order to the accused, just as did not present such claims in a lawful form even after the conflict.

Based on that conclusion, on May 7, 2021, by a joint statement of seven organizations, including the Viasna Human Rights Centre, the Belarusian Helsinki Committee, Aliaksandr Kardziukou was recognized as a political prisoner. On June 23, 2021, godparenthood for Aliaksandr Kardziukou was undertaken by Elisabeth Falkhaven, Member of Parliament of Sweden.

== See also ==
- Alexander Taraikovsky
- Raman Bandarenka
- List of deaths related to the 2020 Belarusian protests
