= 2010 Belarusian protests =

Political protests in Belarus

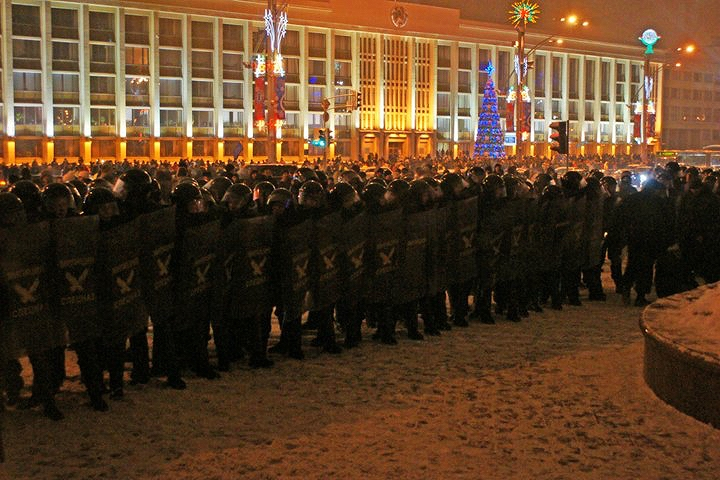
- Protests in Minsk
- Date: 10 - 21 December 2010
- Location: Belarus, mainly Minsk
- Caused by: Electoral fraud during the 2010 Belarusian presidential election Authoritarianism
- Goals: Free and fair elections Resignation of Alexander Lukashenko; Democratization
- Result: Protests suppressed

Parties
(Belarus) Belarusian opposition: Tell the Truth; Belarusian Social Democratic Party (People's Assembly); BPF Party; Belarusian Christian Democracy; Young Front	Government of Belarus: Internal Troops; Militsiya; KGB

Lead figures
(Belarus) Andrei Sannikov (Belarus) Mikola Statkevich (Belarus) Uladzimir Nyaklyayew (Belarus) Ryhor Kastusioŭ (Belarus) Vital Rymasheuski (Belarus) Andrey Dmitriyeu	Alexander Lukashenko (Belarus) Sergei Sidorsky (Belarus) Anatol Kuleshov

The 2010 Belarusian protests were mass protest actions in Belarus against the results of the 2010 Belarusian presidential election, which took place on December 19, 2010 and were brutally dispersed. Between 10,000 and 60,000 people took part in the protest on October Square and Independence Square in Minsk. It was announced that a people's movement for free elections would be created without Lukashenka. Some participants tried to break into the Government House. Clashes with riot police took place. As a result, dozens of people were detained and beaten, including presidential candidates Khaklyaeu, Sannikov, Kastusyou, Statkevich, and Rymasheuski.

== Background ==
Mass political actions and protests have been almost banned since Alexander Lukashenko took power in the 1994 Belarusian presidential election. In 1996 and 1997, a wave of popular demonstrations and massive strikes took place led by opposition members as a continuation of the hunger strikes and unrest in 1995 after the Belarusian constitutional referendum that same year. Mass protests in 1999 against the government was brutally suppressed. Presidential elections have always been rigged and election protests have always been held since 2001, when the 2001 Belarusian presidential election was met with protests. The same happened after the 2004 Belarusian constitutional referendum and the 2006 Belarusian presidential election, when the Jeans Revolution took place. After the 2010 election, protesters marched and chanted slogans depicting the president and saying it was their last straw.

== Civil unrest ==
On the eve of the election, Uladzimir Nyaklyaeu, Vital Rymasheuski, Andrei Sannikov and Mikalai Statkevich called on their supporters to hold a rally on October Square in Minsk on December 19. Reinforced police forces were brought to her. A number of opposition websites were unavailable in Minsk, as well as LiveJournal, Twitter, and some other websites. HTTPS secure sites are also not available. In addition, the opposition websites Belarusian Partisan and Charter 97 were unavailable for a long time during the attack. Even before the beginning of the rally, at half past seven, unknown people in black attacked Uladzimir Nyaklyaeu's column, which was heading to the square. Uladzimir Nyaklyaeu lost consciousness during beating, he was taken away by ambulance. Other opposition nominees joined their supporters in the square at 8 p.m. An hour later, 5 nominees took part in a march to Independence Square, where the Government House is located, where the National Assembly of Belarus and the Central Election Commission meet, where the votes were being counted at the time. There was a rally and an attempt to negotiate with the government.

During the protest, a group of unidentified individuals attempted to storm the Government House, breaking glass and breaking doors. There was also a version that the glass and doors in the Government House were broken by provocateurs. In response, the police indiscriminately started beating peaceful marchers, which led to the application of several demonstrators traumatic brain injury and abandonment of the area by most participants in the march. About 5,000 of them remained with Sannikov and Rymasheuski. At midnight, after the organizers of the rally tried to summon the leadership of the security forces for talks, hundreds of policemen dispersed them as well. At the same time, one of the presidential candidates Viktor Tereshchenko, who did not take part in the rally and immediately admitted his defeat by Lukashenko, published on his website on December 20, 2010 that "10 days before the storming of the Government House, presidential candidates offered to consider this scenario" and invited him to participate, but he refused. At the same time Tereshchenko admitted that due to the situation after the presidential election, he planned to emigrate with his family to seek political asylum in another country. Organisers said the rally would be indefinite and urged everyone to come to Independence Square on Monday, December 20, at 6 p.m. The day after the election, on December 20, at 6 pm, 50 to 200 people gathered in Independence Square and were dispersed by riot police, and some of the protesters were arrested.

On December 20, Lukashenko announced the arrest of 639 people and confirmed that presidential candidates were being interrogated in KGB detention centers. On December 29, Nyaklyaeu, Rymasheuski, Sannikov, and Statkevich were charged with organizing an unauthorized public event, which under Article 293 of the Criminal Code provided for imprisonment for a term of 5 to 15 years. On February 17, Nyaklyaeu, a member of the campaign, was sentenced to four years in prison. Most of those arrested were sentenced to fines of up to 30 "base amounts" (about 265 euros) and 15 days in prison. On December 31, the Ministry of Foreign Affair announced the termination of the powers of the OSCE Office in Minsk due to the government's unwillingness to extend them. On January 21, Lukashenko was sworn in for a fourth presidential oath.

== Aftermath ==
The official newspaper of the Lukashenko administration "Soviet Belarus - Belarus Today" on the basis of declassified documents of the Belarusian secret services accused the special services of Poland and Germany of the events of December 19 in Minsk.

== In art ==
- Viva Belarus! - the most famous film about the political regime of Alexander Lukashenko and human rights in Belarus during his rule, culminating in the 2010 protests in Minsk

== See also ==
- Jeans Revolution
- 2020 Belarusian protests
- 2011 Belarusian protests
