= 2017 Belarusian protests =

Series of political demonstrations

- Part of the Belarusian democracy movement
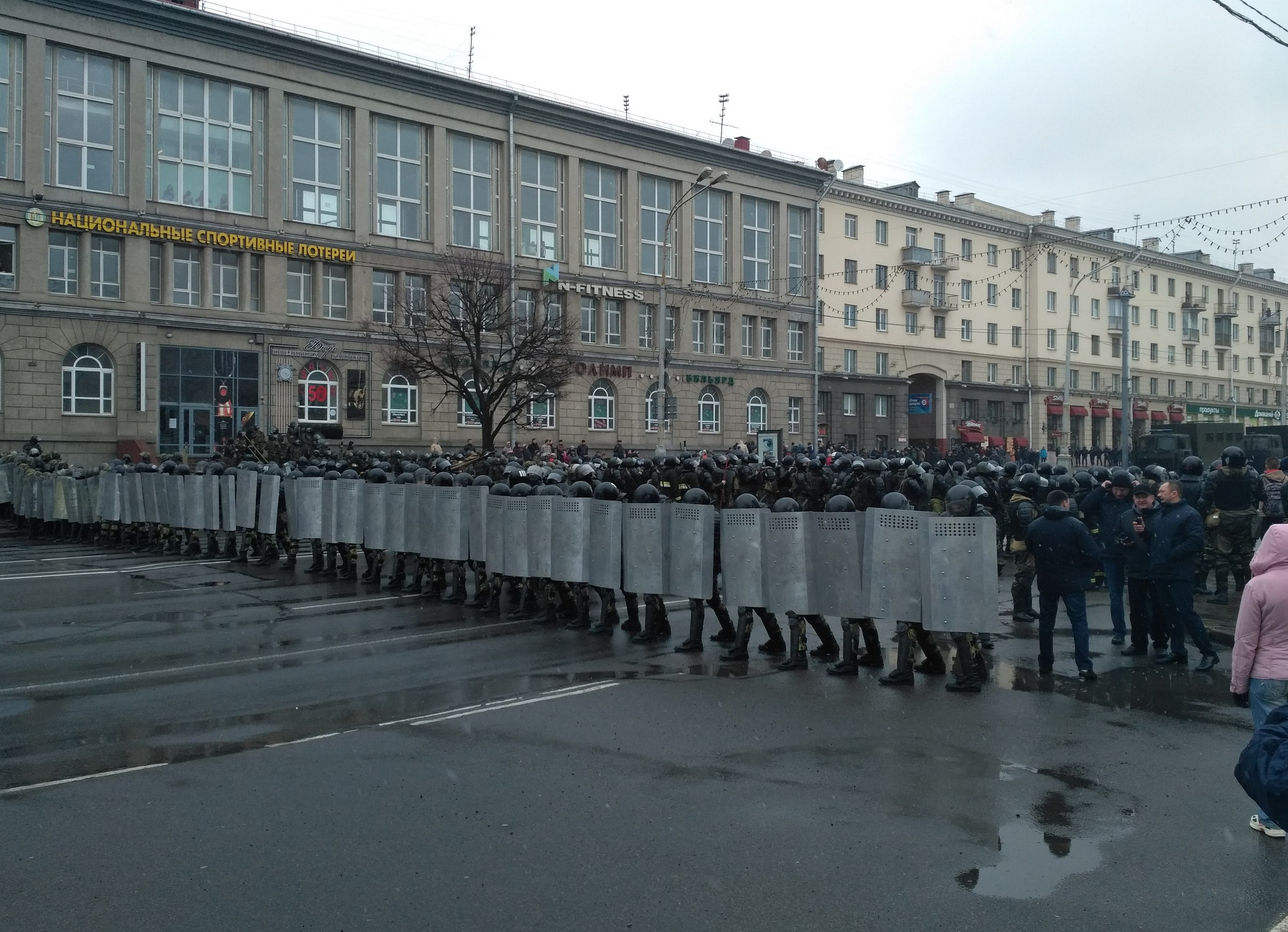
- Independence Avenue in Minsk, blocked by riot police (25 March 2017)
- Date: 17 February – 21 October 2017
- Location: Beginning in Minsk, spreading through Belarus, including Gomel, Mogilev, Vitebsk, Grodno and Brest.
- Caused by: Taxation on the unemployed (Decree No. 3); Economic and social policies of the government
- Goals: Cancellation of Decree No. 3; Alexander Lukashenko's resignation; Resignation of the government; New presidential elections
- Methods: Demonstrations; Protest marches; Online activism
- Status: Ended

Parties
(Belarus) Opposition: United Civic Party; BChD; People's Assembly; Belarusian Green Party; Belarusian Left Party "A Just World"; Young Front; Anarchists	(Belarus) Government: Ministry of Internal Affairs; State Security Committee

Lead figures
(Belarus) Mikola Statkevich (Belarus) Uladzimir Nyaklyayew (Belarus) Paval Sieviaryniec (Belarus) Zmitser Dashkevich (Belarus) Vital Rymasheuski (Belarus) Yury Gubarevich (Belarus) Anatoly Lebedko (Belarus) Stanislav Shushkevich (Belarus) Zianon Pazniak (Belarus) Tatsyana Karatkyevich (Belarus) Hanna Kanapatskaya (Belarus) Andrey Dmitriyeu	Alexander Lukashenko (Belarus) Andrei Kobyakov (Belarus) Igor Shunevich (Belarus) Valery Vakulchik

Number
5000 protesters (At highest point); Total number estimated 25,000–40,000	Unknown

Casualties
- Detained: >700

The 2017 Belarusian protests were a series of demonstrations and street protests against President Alexander Lukashenko that broke out in late February 2017. Protesters mobilized against a tax levied against the unemployed in Belarus. Demonstrations and marches were held in sites throughout the country with sizes of several hundred to several thousand gathering at a given time.

== Context ==
Belarus has been described for several years as Europe's "last dictatorship" with no genuine political opposition against Lukashenko possible. Previous protests in 2011 and 2015 resulted in mass arrests. The country has also been in an economic recession since 2015 due to falling gasoline prices and that year a law was passed taxing the unemployed. Roughly 470,000 Belarusians are obliged to pay the tax but only about 10% have since it was issued.

== Activities ==
Approximately 2,500 protesters filled the streets in Minsk on 17 February to protest a policy that required anyone who works for less than 183 days per year to pay US$250 for "lost taxes" to help fund welfare policies. This converts to approximately 5 million Belarusian rubles. The law has proven unpopular and has been mocked in the public as the "law against social parasites". On 19 February, another 2,000 demonstrated in the second city of Gomel. Both gatherings were unauthorized but were not disrupted by authorities. Smaller demonstrations were held in other cities.

On 25 March, opposition leader Vladimir Nekliayev, who was set to speak at the main protest, was stopped in the morning on his way to Minsk, his wife said.

The government defended the mass arrests and beatings against citizens by alleging that the police had found "petrol bombs and arms-laden cars" near a protest in Minsk.

== Timeline of the events ==
=== 19 February ===
- Brest – a rally, about 100 protesters.
- Gomel – procession (from 1,500 to 3,000 people)
- Grodno – a few dozen people, march to the Municipal Administration
- Vitebsk – 250 people
- Mogilev – meeting, 200 people

=== 26 February ===
- Brest – a rally, about 300 participants.
- Baranovichi – a rally, about 300 participants.
- Babruysk – gathered about 1,500 protesters.

=== 5 March ===
- Brest – Rally and procession from 1,000 to 2,000 people.

The mayor of Brest met with the protesters.

=== 10 March ===
- Maladzyechna – a rally in the Central Square, speeches, the adoption of a resolution and the procession to the tax service. The number of people gathered from 500 to 1,000 people.

After the rally, the organizers received 15 days of arrest.

=== 11 March ===
- In Pinsk 350 to 400 people gathered in the square.

=== 12 March ===
- Brest – on the square came out 200 people
- Babruysk – about 700 protesters gathered at Pieramohi square. The rally was spontaneous, none of the opposition leaders were present.
- Orsha - the number of people gathered exceeded 1,000 people. Before the rally, journalists were detained to check documents
- Rahachow - about 400 participants. People discussed the current government and whether there is an alternative to it, and complained about the lack of work.

=== 15 March ===
- Mogilev – More than 500 residents of Mogilev went to protest

To the protesting crowd came member of parliament Igor Marzalyuk, five people arrested

- Minsk – From the cinema "Kastryčnik" to Banhalor Square and Družby Narodaŭ Park passed 1.5 to 4.5 thousand people, chanting "Long Live Belarus!", "No to Decree No.3 – Lukashenka go away!"

About 40 people were detained in Minsk.

- Grodno – The meeting began with 300 protesters. At the end of the protest on the square there were 1,000 protesters.

=== 25 March ===
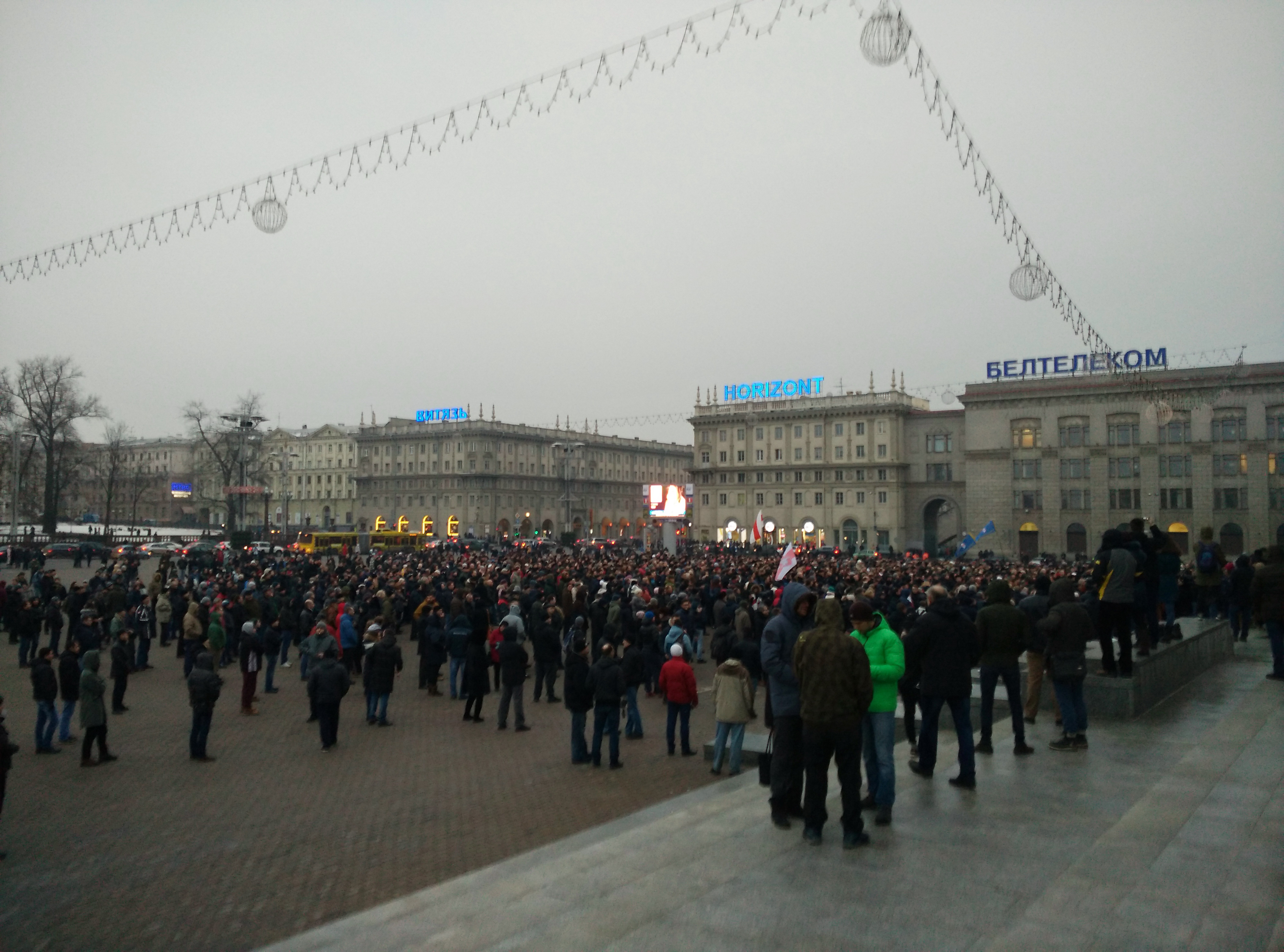
Minsk, Kartryčnickaja plošča, 17 February

- Minsk – Several thousand people went to protest

=== 1 May ===
- Minsk – 400 people came to a banned protest despite the jailing of Mikola Statkevich, opposition leader and main organizer of the event.

== See also ==
- 2017 Romanian protests
- 2017 Russian protests
- 2020-2021 Belarusian protests
- Euromaidan
