= Evgeny Vyborov =

Russian bandy player and coach (1953–2025)

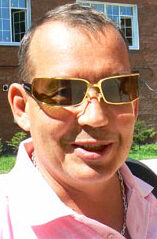
- Vyborov in 2007

Personal information
- Full name: Evgeny Petrovich Vyborov
- Born: 27 April 1953 Cheremkhovo, Irkutsk Oblast, Russian SFSR, USSR
- Died: 31 August 2025 (aged 72)

Senior career*
Years	Team	Apps^{†}	(Gls)^{†}
1969–1971	Lokomotiv		
1972–1975	Argun		
1975–1980	Yunost		

Teams managed
- 1980–1989,: Baykal-Energiya
- 1989–1998: Agrokhim
- 1998–2001: Baykal-Energiya
- 2001–2002: SKA-Sverdlovsk
- 2002–2004: Metallurg Bratsk
- 2004–2006: Baykal-Energiya
- 2006–2010: Mongolia
- * Senior club appearances and goals counted for the domestic league only. † Appearances (Goals).

Evgeny Petrovich Vyborov (Russian: Евгений Петрович Выборов; 27 April 1953 – 31 August 2025) was a Russian bandy player and coach. A recipient of the Medal of the Order for Merit to the Fatherland, he served as head coach of the Mongolian national bandy team from 2006 to 2010.

Vyborov died on 31 August 2025, at the age of 72.
