= Tatsyana Karatkyevich =

Belarusian politician

- Таццяна Караткевіч
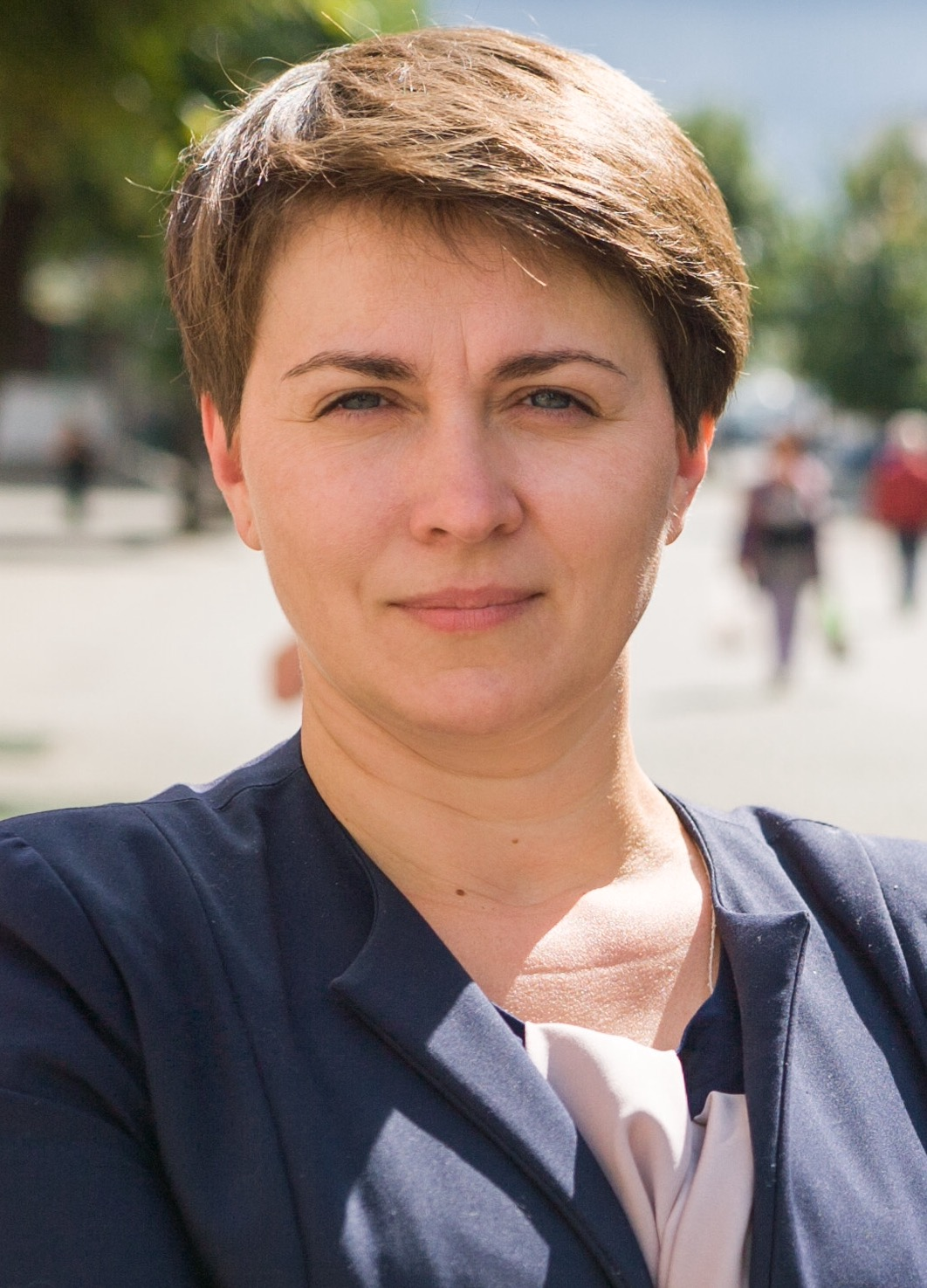
- Karatkyevich in 2015

Personal details
- Born: March 8, 1977 (age 49)
- Party: BSDP(A)

Tatsyana Mikalayewna Karatkyevich (Belarusian: Таццяна Мікалаеўна Караткевіч, romanized: Tacciana Mikalajeŭna Karatkievič; Russian: Татьяна Николаевна Короткевич, romanized: Tatyana Nikolayevna Korotkevich; born 8 March 1977) is a Belarusian politician and a member of civic campaign Tell the Truth. Karatkyevich has been of "Tell the Truth" since 2010 and alongside other initiative groups who are dissatisfied with current government plans. She was a candidate for the 2015 presidential election, garnering 4.4% of the vote.

In 2020, Tatsyana Karatkyevich headed the initiative group to nominate the co-chair of Tell the Truth Andrey Dmitriyeu as a candidate in the 2020 presidential election. In 2024, Karatkyevich received 15 days of administrative arrest under a political article for a “prohibited” photograph on her social networks.

== Early and personal life ==
Karatkyevich was born on 8 March 1977 in Minsk, then part of the Byelorussian SSR. She graduated from the Maksim Tank Belarusian State Pedagogical University, where afterwards she worked as a teacher in psychology for 11 years as well as the Belarusian State University. For 3 years she headed the department of rehabilitation at the Territorial Center for Social Services in Minsk afterwards, and then for 2 years she was the director of the institution "Family Playground". She initially joined the Belarusian Social Democratic Party (BSDP) in 1999, an anti-Alexander Lukashenko party, before leaving the party in 2016. She has since then been described as a friend of the BSDP.

She was married to a car mechanic for ambulances and has a son named Elisey. She divorced her husband in 2016, which she attributed to them no longer liking the same things and stress from her personal political life.
