= Metallurg =

Metallurg (Russian: Металлу́рг, Ukrainian: Металург, Macedonian: Металург) is the name of several ex-Soviet sport clubs:

- Metallurg Bratsk, a Russian bandy club
- Metallurg Magnitogorsk, a Russian ice hockey club
- Metallurg Novokuznetsk, another Russian hockey club
- FC Metallurg Lipetsk, a Russian football club
- FC Metallurg-Kuzbass Novokuznetsk, a Russian football club
- FK Metalurg Skopje, a football club from Macedonia
- Metallurg Kadamjay, a Kyrgyzstani football club
- FC Metalurh Donetsk, a Ukrainian football club
- FC Metalurh Zaporizhzhya, a Ukrainian football club
- PFK Metallurg Bekabad, an Uzbekistani football club
