= Uladzimir Mackievič =

Belarusian philosopher

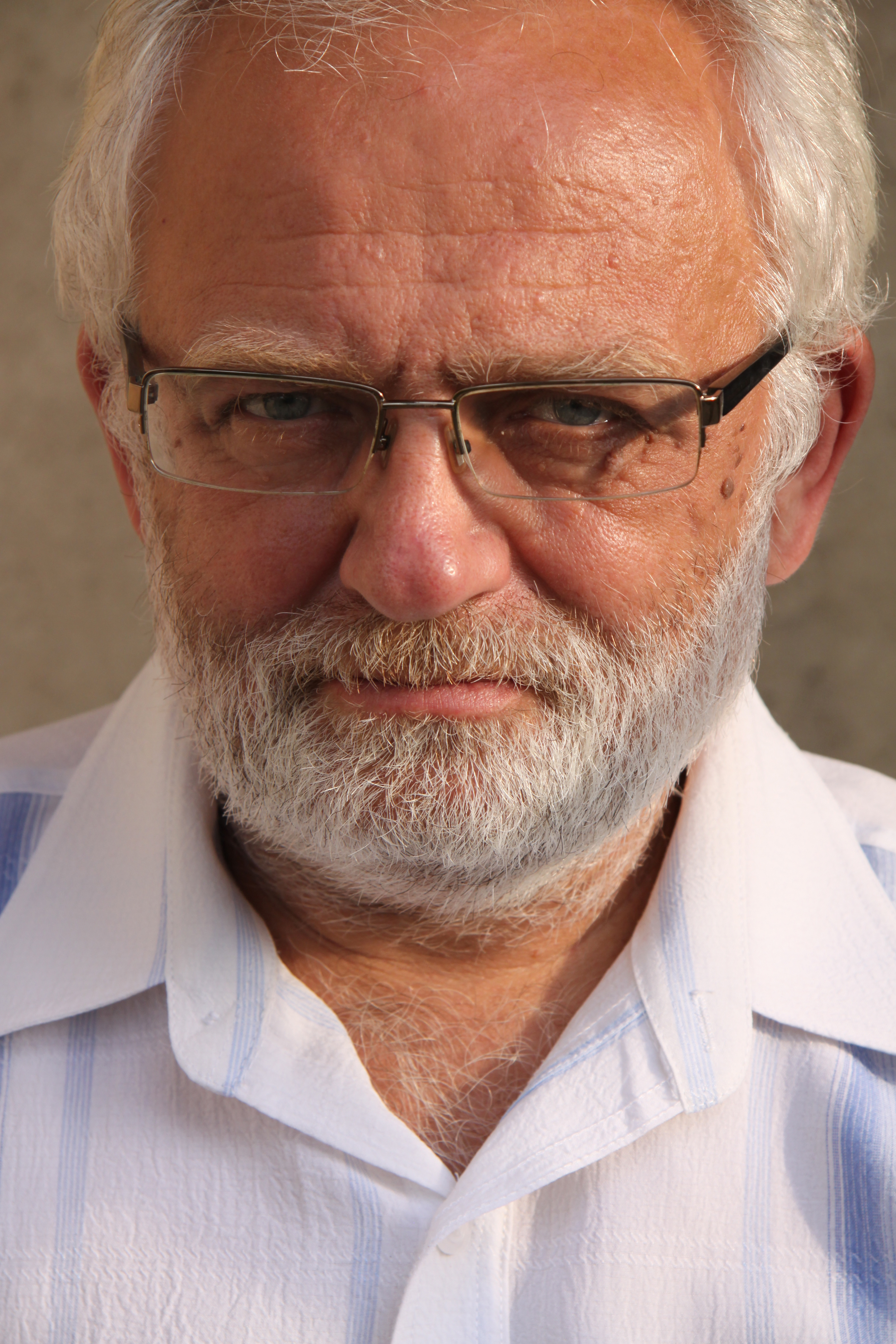
Uladzimir Mackievič (Matskevich)

Uladzimir Uladzimiravič Mackievič (also Uladzimir Matskevich; Belarusian: Уладзімір Уладзіміравіч Мацкевіч; Vladimir Vladimirovich Matskevich, Russian: Владимир Владимирович Мацкевич; born 14 May 1956, Cheremkhovo, Irkutsk Oblast, RSFSR, USSR) is a Belarusian philosopher (methodologist), social and political activist. He was arrested on 4 August 2021 by the Belarusian authorities. Human rights organizations declared him a political prisoner.

== Biography ==
His Belarusian parents were forcibly transferred to Siberia where Mackievič was born. His family was soon rehabilitated and returned to Belarus in 1966. He graduated from the Leningrad State University with a degree in psychology. He was strongly influenced by Georgy Shchedrovitsky and the Moscow methodological circle.

In the late 1980s, he lived in Latvia and participated in perestroika there. In 1994, he returned to Belarus. In 1990s, Mackievič participated in different electoral campaigns as a candidate and as a political technologist. He also consulted 3 parties that merged into the United Civic Party. Charter 97 was also formed with his participation. Mackievič is a longtime critic of Alexander Lukashenko, in 2011 he characterized the political situation as a "personalist dictatorship that established martial law". He supported the protests after 2020 presidential election and called Lukashenko the "illegitimate president". In February 2021, Mackievič welcomed the appearance of the recently published strategy of the joint opposition but criticized much of its content.

In 1994 and 1996, Mackievič participated in the development of two projects of educational reform by request of the Ministry of education of Belarus, but these projects weren't implemented. In 2007, Mackievič participated in the creation of EuroBelarus NGO which is a member of the Eastern Partnership Civil Society Forum. He also founded and led the Humanitarian Technologies Agency (Russian: Агентство гуманитарных технологий). Mackievič together with a sociologist Tatsiana Vadalazhskaya created the "Flying university" (Russian: Летучий университет) which focused on the development of critical thinking.

He was detained on 4 August 2021. Tatsiana Vadalazhskaya and several other activists related to him were detained on the same day. On 6 August, 8 Belarusian human rights organizations declared him a political prisoner in a joint statement. He was charged with "organizing of actions that grossly violate public order" under article 342 of the Criminal Code of Belarus.

On 4 February 2022, Mackievič declared a hunger strike demanding to change the preventive measure to a recognizance not to leave, complete the investigation and set a date for the trial. He also threatened to start a dry hunger strike (refusal to take food and water) on February 15. He stopped his hunger strike on the eve of 16 February after he was visited by the interrogator.

In June 2022, Mackievič was sentenced to 5 years in a maximum security penal colony. On September 11, 2025, after being pardoned, he was de-facto deported to Lithuania along with fifty other Belarusian political prisoners.

In 2011, he had more than 50 published works.

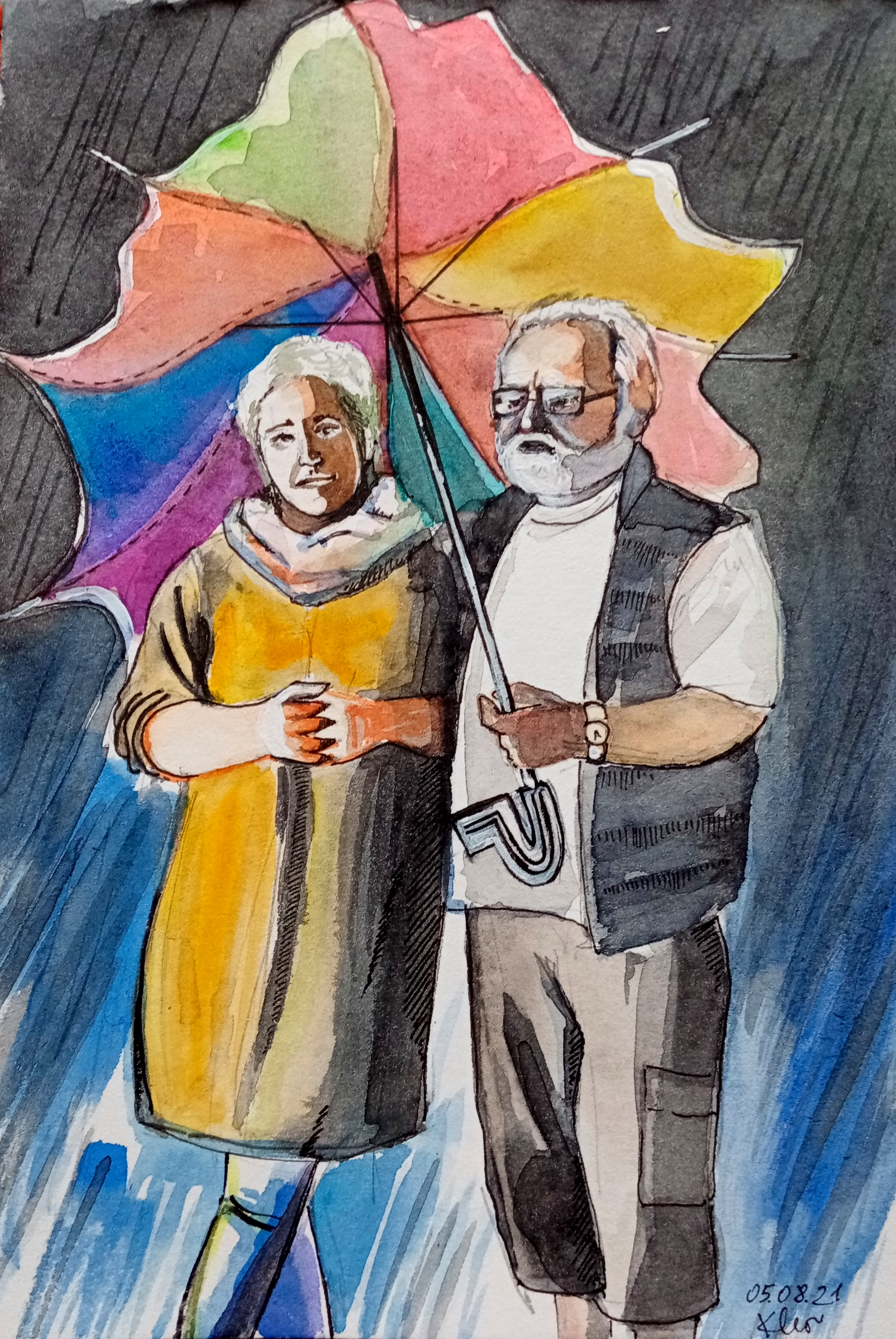
Tatsiana Vadalazhskaya and Uladzimir Mackievič think Belarus.
