= Hanna Kanapatskaya =

Belarusian politician, lawyer and entrepreneur

- Ганна Канапацкая
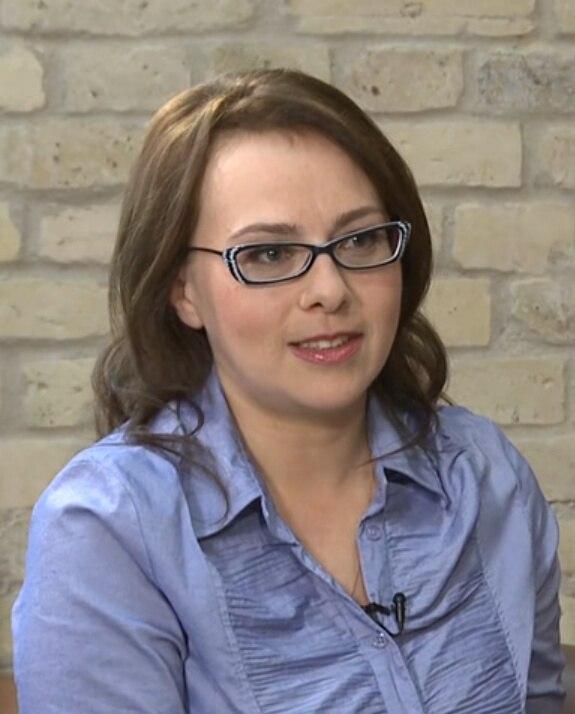
- Kanapatskaya in 2015
- Born: Hanna Kanapatskaya; 29 October 1976 (age 49); Minsk, Soviet Union (now Belarus)
- Education: Belarusian State University
- Occupations: lawyer, politician, entrepreneur
- Years active: 1995 – present
- Known for: Presidential candidate in the 2020 Belarusian presidential election
- Office: Member of the House of Representatives of Belarus
- Term: 2016–2019
- Political party: Independent
- Other political affiliations: United Civic Party of Belarus (1995–2019)

Hanna Anatolyeuna Kanapatskaya (Belarusian: Ганна Анатольеўна Канапацкая), also known as Anna Anatolyevna Kanopatskaya (Russian: А́нна Анато́льевна Канопа́цкая), (born 29 October 1976) is a Belarusian politician, former MP, lawyer and entrepreneur who was a candidate in the 2020 Belarusian presidential election. She previously served as a parliamentary deputy for the United Civic Party of Belarus from 1995 to 2019, and held a seat as an MP between 2016 and 2019. She has conducted a political campaign calling for Belarus to be freed from Russian interference.

== Early life and education ==
Hanna Kanapatskaya was born on 29 October 1976 in Minsk. Her father Anatoly Trukhanovich is a dollar millionaire and her mother is a housewife. She completed her education at the Minsk School no. 55 and graduated from the Faculty of Law at the Belarusian State University (BSU). She is no longer married, but has two children – Alyaksey, who studied economics at BSU, and Anastasia, who studies in Austria.

== Political career ==
She contested at the 2016 Belarusian parliamentary election representing the United Civic Party and was elected as a deputy of the House of Representatives. She won a seat in the 97th electoral district in the Kastryjčnickaja district of Minsk and was elected to the lower house of Belarus National Assembly as just one of only two opposition candidates along with Alena Anisim. The instance also made her and one other independent candidate to be the first opposition MPs being represented in parliament of Belarus since 2004.

She stepped down from the position of parliamentary deputy in 2019 after a fallout with the United Civic Party following the 2019 Belarusian parliamentary election, where the party failed to receive any seats. She also reported to have run for the position of member of parliament in 2019 but the signatures were invalidated by the Central Election Commission of Belarus.

=== 2020 presidential election ===
On 20 May 2020, she self-nominated as an independent candidate as she decided to stand as an independent candidate following a fallout with United Civic Party in 2019. She also initially attempted to become a main single candidate from the opposition but her candidacy claim was rejected by other primaries. She applied for the registration on 12 May 2020.

On 10 June 2020, she claimed that she had received a total of 100,000 signatures as submissions to the Central Election Commission of Belarus and became the fourth candidate to receive 100,000 signatures and eventually became eligible to contest at the election. She also refused to take part in television debates prior to the election and during an interview in July 2020, she claimed that apart from President Alexander Lukashenko, other candidates were relatively weak and insisted that Lukashenko is the only major rival. She also revealed that she decided to run for presidency by claiming that people of Belarus have lost trust and confidence on Lukashenko's dictator rule for 26 years.

On 10 August 2020, the election results were released and Hanna clinched third place among the candidates with a total valid vote count of 1.68%. Kanapatskaya submitted a case to the country's Supreme Court, citing gross electoral violations, but the case was rejected. After the elections, Kanapatskaya announced a plan to create the National Democratic Party of Belarus, but it is unclear if it was implemented.

=== Later career ===
In February 2021, Kanapatskaya was selected to participate in the All-Belarusian People's Assembly as a representative of "the constructive opposition", as claimed by the Telegram channel of the Assembly. Siarhei Cherachen and Ihar Barysaǔ, two opposition social democratic politicians, were reportedly also invited, but they denied that they would participate. When Kanapatskaya was given a chance to speak at the assembly, the live TV broadcast was abruptly cut short a few moments into her speech. She publicly announced that she "recognized the victory" of Lukashenko in the elections, but urged to suspend any constitutional amendment proposal until after elections are held, roll back closer integration with Russia, pleaded against the ban on "national symbols" (e.g. the White-red-white flag) and for changing the measures enacted against political detainees to not include detention.

Kanapatskaya ran in the 2025 Belarusian presidential election and presented herself as the "only democratic alternative to Lukashenko" and pledged for the release of political prisoners while warning supporters against "excessive initiative". She added "I do not fight with police officers because it is a crime. But that doesn't mean I support the policies of the current leadership of the country."
