= Andrey Dmitriyeu =

Belarusian politician and social activist

Andrey Uladzimiravich Dzmitryeu
- Андрэй Уладзіміравіч Дзмітрыеў
- Born: 12 May 1981 (age 45); Minsk, Byelorussian Soviet Socialist Republic, Soviet Union (now Belarus)
- Other name: Andrey Dmitriev
- Education: European Humanities University
- Occupations: politician, social activist
- Years active: 2010 – present
- Known for: Presidential candidate in the 2020 Belarusian presidential election
- Political party: Tell the Truth (2019 – present)
- Website: dzmitryeu.by

Andrey Uladzimiravich Dzmitryeu (Belarusian: Андрэй Уладзіміравіч Дзмітрыеў), also known as Andrey Vladimirovich Dmitriev (Russian: Андрей Владимирович Дмитриев; born 12 May 1981) is a Belarusian social activist, politician and candidate in the 2020 Belarusian presidential election. He is the current co-chairman of the Tell the Truth, a political movement which is known for raising its voice and vocal criticism of Alexander Lukashenko's authoritarian rule.

== Career ==
He pursued his higher studies at the European Humanities University in Lithuania. He also became a member of non governmental organisation Tell the Truth. He also worked as a political analyst in campaigns and heading an initiative group of citizens for opposition candidates of Lukashenko during the 2010 Belarusian presidential election (Uladzimir Nyaklyayew) and during the 2015 Belarusian presidential election (Tatsiana Karatkevich).

He became vice chairman of the Tell the Truth in 2013. In September 2019, he was appointed as the co-chair of the Tell the Truth.

=== 2020 presidential election ===
On 8 May, he was nominated as an independent presidential candidate for the 2020 Belarusian presidential election.

On 10 August 2020, the election results were released and Andrey clinched fourth spot among the five candidates with a total valid vote count of 1.21%.

=== 2021 and beyond ===
In August 2021, Dzmitriyeu was briefly detained in a wave of arrests.

On January 11, 2023, he was detained again. This time, Dzmitriyeu was charged with "participating in group actions against the public order" in 2020. Viasna and other human rights organizations in Belarus have recognized Andrey Dzmitryeu as a political prisoner. On April 6, he was sentenced to 18 months in prison.
