= 2020 Belarusian presidential election =

- 9 August 2020
- Registered: 6,904,649
- Turnout: 84.28% (▼2.94 pp)
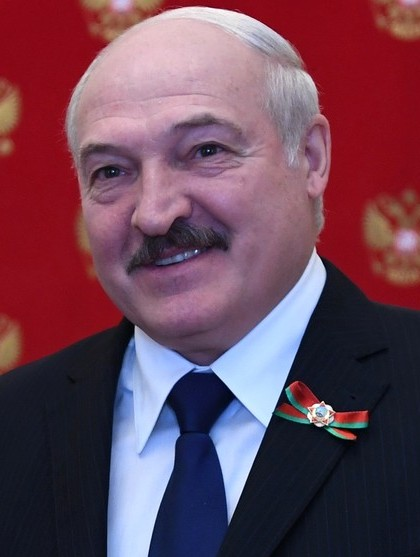

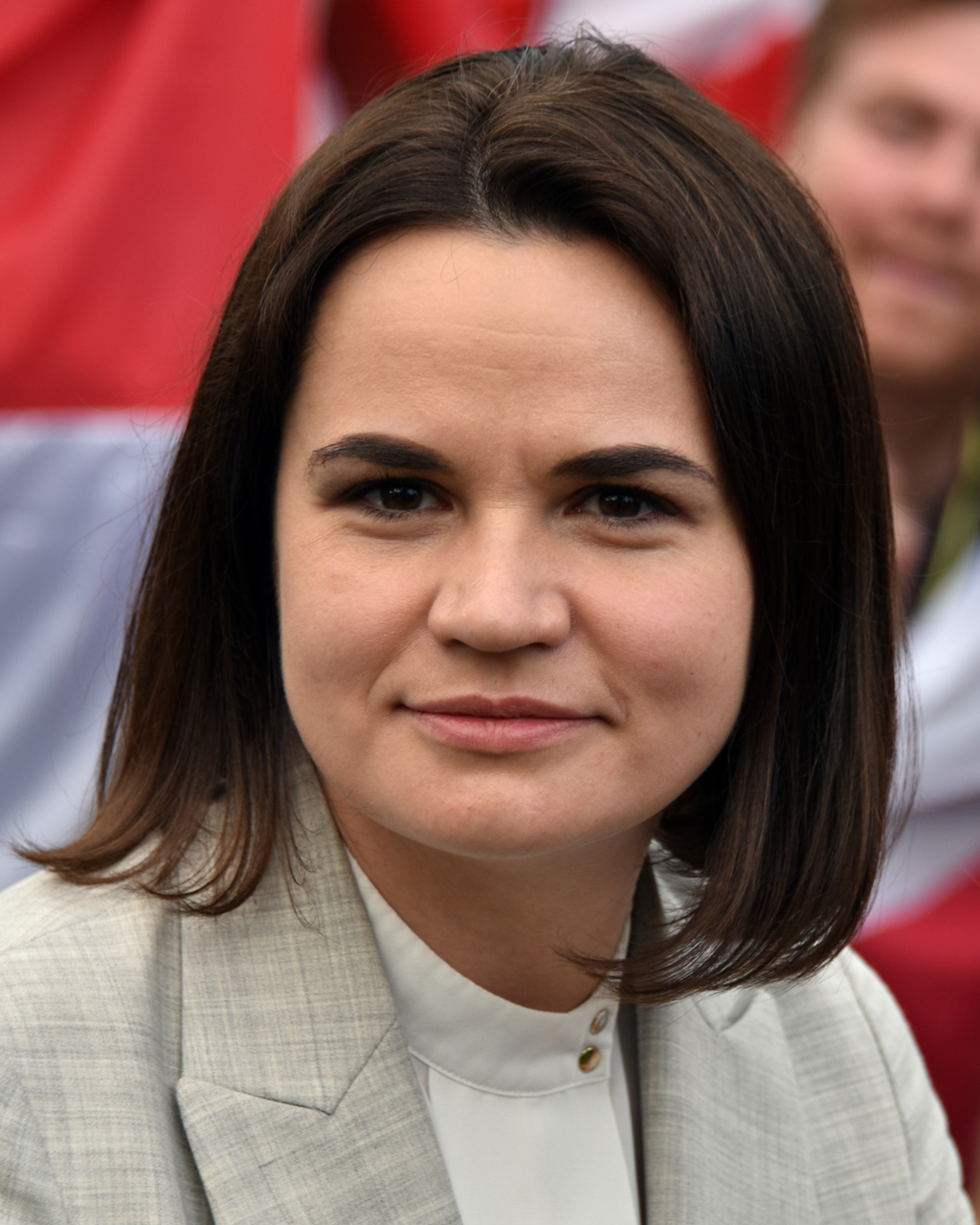
Nominee	Alexander Lukashenko	Sviatlana Tsikhanouskaya
Party	Independent	Independent
Alliance	Belaya Rus	Country for Life
Popular vote	4,661,075	588,619
Percentage	81.04%	10.23%
- Official results by region
President before election
Alexander Lukashenko
Independent
Elected President
Alexander Lukashenko
Independent

Presidential elections were held in Belarus on Sunday, 9 August 2020. Early voting began on 4 August and ran until 8 August.

Incumbent Alexander Lukashenko was announced by the Central Election Commission (CEC) to have won a sixth term in office, crediting him with just over 80% of the vote. Lukashenko has won every presidential election since 1994, with all but the first being labelled by international monitors as neither free nor fair.

Opposition candidate Sviatlana Tsikhanouskaya claimed to have won a decisive first-round victory with at least 60% of the vote, and called on Lukashenko to start negotiations. Her campaign subsequently formed the Coordination Council to facilitate a transfer of power and stated that it was ready to organize "long-term protests" against the official results. All seven members of the Coordination Council Presidium were subsequently arrested or went into exile.

All opposition candidates filed appeals to the Central Election Commission calling for the results to be invalidated. The election was marred by claims of widespread electoral fraud. Numerous countries refused to accept the result of the election, as did the European Union, which imposed sanctions on Belarusian officials deemed to be responsible for "violence, repression and election fraud". The results of the election led to widespread protests.

== Background ==
On 8 May 2020 the National Assembly set 9 August as the date for the presidential election.

Incumbent president Alexander Lukashenko had been leading the country since the first presidential elections held in 1994. Over the next two years, he rapidly consolidated his power. In 1995, he won a referendum that gave him the power to dissolve the legislature if he felt it contravened the Constitution. In 1996, he won another referendum that dramatically increased his power, and also extended his original five-year term to 2001. Since then, his regime has been reckoned as an authoritarian dictatorship by Western observers. Opposition activists are often pressured or detained by the government, and Lukashenko or those loyal to him control (as of 2020) all of the seats in both houses of the National Assembly, all judicial appointments, the media, and the CEC (which has the power to approve or deny candidates for political offices).

== Electoral system ==
The president of Belarus is elected using the two-round system. If no candidate obtains over 50% of the vote, a second round is held with the top two candidates. The winner of the second round is elected. A turnout quorum of 50% is applied.

Despite the two-round system being in place, a second round has not been officially required since 1994. In the previous four elections, Lukashenko claimed margins of 77% or more in the first round. No election since 1994 has met international standards of transparency and fairness.

== Candidates ==
=== Registered candidates ===
To register as a candidate, nominees were required to meet certain criteria:

- Being nominated by the signatures of no fewer than 100 thousand citizens.
- Required to submit an application for an initiative group of voters containing no fewer than 100 persons.

The following list has information about registered candidates by the CEC for the presidential election on 21 July 2020.

Registered candidates for the 2020 Belarusian presidential election
Candidate	Occupation	Subject of nomination	Application date	Initiative group registration date	Initiative group size
Alexander Lukashenko	Incumbent president of Belarus	Self-nomination	17 November 2019	15 May 2020	11,480
Siarhei Cherachen	Chairman of the Belarusian Social Democratic Assembly	Belarusian Social Democratic Assembly	11 January 2020	20 May 2020	1,127
Hanna Kanapatskaya	Member of Parliament (2016–2019)	Self-nomination	12 May 2020	20 May 2020	1,314
Andrey Dmitriyeu	Co-chairman of the political movement "Tell the Truth"	Tell the Truth	8 May 2020	20 May 2020	2,399
Sviatlana Tsikhanouskaya	Human rights activist and politician	Self-nomination	15 May 2020	20 May 2020	247

=== Denied candidates ===
- Viktar Babaryka – former chairman of the Management Board of OJSC Belgazprombank
  - On 14 July the CEC voted unanimously to deny Babaryka's registration due to an alleged inconsistency in his submitted income and property declaration.
- Valery Tsepkalo – founder and former director (2005–2017) of the Belarus High Technologies Park
  - On 30 June the CEC announced that Tsepkalo had only gathered 75,249 valid signatures (out of 160,000 he had submitted). This was below the 100,000 required to run for president. On 24 July, fearing arrest, Tsepkalo fled to Russia with his two children.
- Sergei Tikhanovsky – political and business YouTube blogger. Tikhanovsky was taken to prison shortly after announcing his candidature. After five years, on 21 June 2025, he was released together with 13 other political prisoners.
- Yuri Hantsevich – farmer and blogger
- Yuras Hubarevich – head of the Movement "For Freedom"
- Volha Kavalkova – co-chairman of the organizing committee for the establishment of the Belarusian Christian Democracy
- Mikalai Kazlou – acting chairman of United Civic Party of Belarus
- Natallia Kisel – individual entrepreneur
- Vladimir Nepomnyashchikh – pensioner
- Ales Tabolich – musician, frontman of the folk-metal band Znich

=== Withdrawn candidates ===
- Alena Anisim – Member of the House of Representatives of Belarus (pro-opposition independent)
- Aleh Gaidukevich – politician of the Liberal Democratic Party of Belarus

=== Declined candidates ===
- Siarhei Skrabets – former member of the House of Representatives of Belarus
- Mikola Statkevich – head of the People's Hramada and former presidential candidate
- Aliaksei Yanukevich – former chairman of the Belarusian Popular Front Party

In January 2020, five opposition forces, the Movement "For Freedom", Belarusian Christian Democracy, Belarusian Social Democratic Party (Assembly), BPF Party and United Civic Party of Belarus reached a definite agreement to hold primaries to field a single candidate from the Belarusian opposition. Yury Hubarevich (For Freedom), Paval Sieviaryniec, Volha Kavalkova (both BCD), Aliaksei Yanukevich (BPF) and Mikalai Kazlou (UCPB) were listed as potential candidates.

The Belarusian Green Party announced that it would not participate in the primaries and the election.

The Belarusian Left Party "A Just World" called for a boycott of the election, describing the election a "political farce".

=== Collection of signatures ===
Candidates who received more than 100,000 signatures in support of their candidacy
Candidate	Signatures collected				Signatures submitted	Signatures accepted
Candidate	28 May	4 June	8 June	19 June	Signatures submitted	Signatures accepted
Viktar Babaryka	51,259	82,519	167,001	435,119	367,179	165,744
Siarhei Cherachen	20,247	52,991	74,382	153,764	149,750	143,109
Andrey Dmitriyeu	14,118	36,475	59,975	112,950	110,754	106,841
Anna Kanapatskaya	12,483	36,432	72,864	159,728	151,631	146,588
Natallia Kisel	37,235	62,470	73,941	108,705	N/A	
Alexander Lukashenko	199,752	499,256	998,760	1,997,520	1,958,800	1,939,572
Valery Tsepkalo	19,807	54,828	118,456	212,412	158,682	75,249
Sviatlana Tsikhanouskaya	1,567		59,774	145,322	109,479	104,757

Most government organizations forced their employees to sign for Alexander Lukashenko under threats that their work contracts would not be renewed.

== Timeline ==
May

- 5 May — The House of Representatives of Belarus schedules the date for the presidential election.
- 15 May — Last day to register as a candidate, a total of 55 candidates apply. This is a record for independent Belarus.
- 20 May — The CEC registers a total of 15 groups on 15, 19 and 20 May.
- 22 May — Election commissions are formed.
- 29 May — Siarhei Tsikhanouski holds a picket in Hrodno at which he and nine activists of his initiative group are detained.

June

- 5 June — The first picket in the election campaign takes place and signatures are collected for the nomination of incumbent president Alexander Lukashenko as a candidate.
- 11 June— The Financial Investigation Department opens a criminal case against a number of employees of Belgazprombank (headed by Viktar Babaryka); searches are carried out in the bank, and fifteen people are detained.
- 17 June — A private bank account held by the headquarters of Viktor Babaryka is blocked, and more than Br 100,000 (US$45,000) are frozen.
- 18 June — Both Viktar and Eduard Babaryka are detained early in the morning. That evening, the "Action of Solidarity" took place in Minsk. Several thousand people lined up in a human chain from Yakub Kolas Square to Independence Square, spanning more than 3 km. The action was loudly approved by applause and honking of passing cars. The event lasted over six hours and ended after midnight.
- 19 June — Yuri Gubarevich and Alexander Tabolich withdraw from the presidential race. After working hours in many cities of the country (Minsk, Homel, Mogilev, Orsha, Pinsk, etc.), the next "Solidarity Actions" are held. In some places there are detentions, and in Brest and Molodechno there are clashes with riot police. According to the Ministry of Internal Affairs, 270 citizens are detained. In the evening, by one of the leaders of Babaryka's campaign releases a proposal to hold a republican referendum and the return of the 1994 Constitution.
- 30 June — The CEC holds a meeting at which five presidential candidates are rejected. Among them is Tsepkalo, who only had 75,000 signatures out of the required 100,000. Most of Tsepkalo's signatures are rejected by CEC.

July

- 14 July — The CEC refuses to register Babaryka for the presidential election because of inconsistencies in the declaration of income and property and the participation of a foreign organization in his election campaign. In many cities across Belarus, including Minsk, protest actions are held, over 250 people are detained, six riot police officers are injured, and 4 are hospitalized.
- 15 July — Citizens form a line to the CEC building to file complaints over the refusal to register Babaryka and Tsepkalo. The line stretches for over a kilometer. Soon police appear and a number of people are detained.
- 16 July
  - The headquarters of Sviatlana Tsikhanouskaya, Babaryka and Tsepkalo unite, asserting need for general control over the course of voting and holding fresh elections if they win.
  - The OSCE representative says that observers will not be present at the upcoming elections because the Belarusian Foreign Ministry did not send an official invitation on time (it was sent on 15 July, when there was less than a month left before the elections).
- 19 July — in the city of Vitebsk and Minsk at Bangalore Square, the first meeting is held with the voters of Tsikhanouskaya, and according to various estimates there are approx. 7,000- 8,000 people total present.
- 21 July — Presidential candidates Tsikhanouskaya, Anna Kanopatskaya, Sergei Cherechen and Andrei Dmitriyeu appear on national TV channel, "Belarus 1".
- 30 July
  - The CEC summons presidential candidates. It is reported that on the night of 29 July 33 Russian citizens were detained and also that security measures are being strengthened and they issued warnings of possible provocation from Russia.
  - Presidential candidate Sviatlana Tsikhanouskaya refused to debate on state-wide TV, and she also challenged Alexander Lukashenko to a one-on-one debate.
  - Presidential candidates Sergei Cherechen, Andrei Dmitriyeu, and Oleg Gaidukevich, Alexander Lukashenko's confidant, took part in the nationally televised debates.
  - A permitted rally of presidential candidate Svetlana Tikhanovskaya took place in the Friendship of Peoples Park in Minsk. According to human rights activists, 63,000–70,000 people gathered, but a statement from the Belarusian Interior Ministry alleged that only 18,250 people had been recorded passing through the metal-detecting checkpoints set up at the event.

August

- 2 August - Tsikhanouskaya and her team visit Baranovichy (the meeting was attended by 7,400 people) and Brest (18,000 people). A planned rally in Pinsk does not take place, since the only site allocated for pre-election rallies was already occupied by Lukashenko's confidant daily until 8 August from the hours of 8:00 AM to 10:00 PM (similarly, the only site in Stolin was booked for the entire pre-election period).
- 4 August - In Slutsk and Salihorsk (Minsk Region), local executive committees cancels meetings with Tsikhanouskaya and her team at the very last minute under the pretext needing to carry out urgent repairs of the only venues allowed for voter meetings. Riot police are sent to both cities and begin detaining some of the people and under similar pretexts, previously agreed meetings with Dmitriyeu in Lyepel and Polotsk (Vitebsk Region) are canceled.
- 5 August—6
  - The Minsk City Executive Committee announces a meeting/concert of Tsikhanouskaya scheduled for 6 August, cannot be held, and that within Friendship of Peoples Park in Minsk it is also not possible, since a holiday in honor of the Day of Railway Troops is to be held there (on 7 and 8 August, the park is reserved for other events). The remaining five sites in Minsk, where pre-election rallies are allowed, were also booked daily until 8 August for events unrelated to the elections. Large-scale holiday concerts with the participation of Russian, Ukrainian and Belarusian pop stars are announced on the official websites of the city executive committees. Free concerts are scheduled for 8 August, the day before the main voting day in the presidential elections, at the main venues in various cities of Belarus. Many artists begin to refuse to perform in Belarusian cities. A special group of the Russian Foundation for Free Elections arrives in Minsk as representatives for CIS observation of international elections.
  - The Tsikhanouskaya's rally is moved to Kievsky Square, which is located a few hundred meters from Bangalore Square, this was meant to be an open day for an additional education institution event to take place in Kievsky Square. From the steps of the cinema "Kiev" the song "Changes" by Viktor Tsoi sounded. Later the two DJs, Vladislav Sokolovsky and Kirill Galanov, who started playing the song, are detained. The song is deemed to be officially illegal in Belarus.
- 7 August
  - The court appointed the sound technicians Kirill Galanov and Vladislav Sokolovsky for 10 days of administrative arrest for hooliganism and disobedience towards the police.
  - Tikhanovskaya addressed the Belarusian people together with her associates Maria Kolesnikova and Veronika Tsepkalo. The Solidarity bike ride took place on 7 August in Minsk.
  - In Minsk, actions of solidarity took place, including a bike ride was held in support of two musicians who were detained. This detention was considered brutal and carried out by the security forces. As of 8 August, several people were detained, some of the detentions ended in violence with ambulances being called. The journalists of the "Current Time" TV channel were also detained. They were deported from the country and barred entry for 10 years.
- 8 August
  - The CEC announced that the turnout in the four days of the early voting reached 32.24%
  - In the evening, Maria Kolesnikova (a member of Tikhanovskaya's headquarters) was detained. She was soon released; authorities claimed she was taken by mistake. Maria Moroz, chief of staff of Tihanovskaya's campaign, was also detained and placed in an isolation center for offenders in Minsk.

== Campaign ==
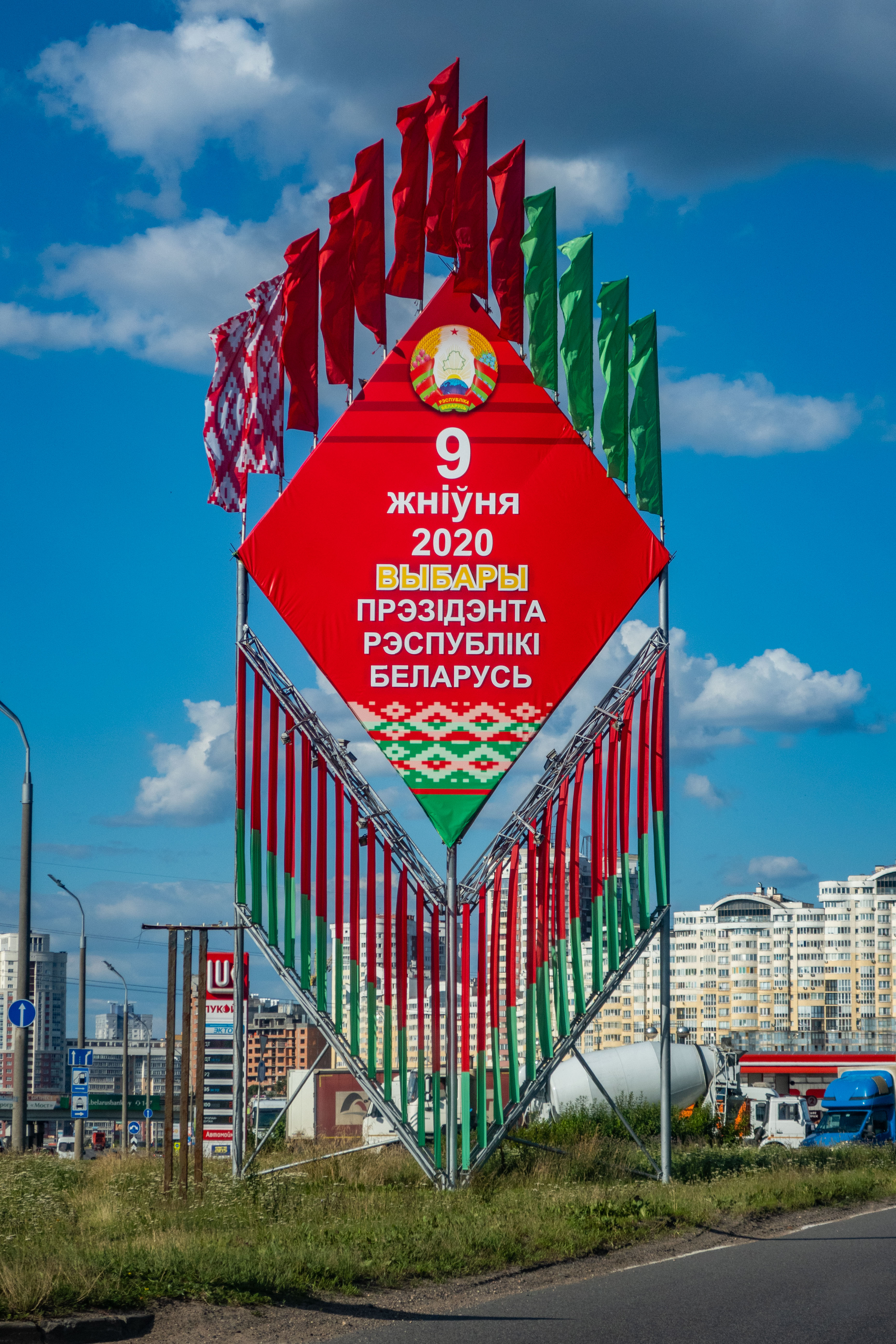
Street banner in Minsk with the date of the election. "9 жніўня 2020 ВЫБАРЫ ПРЭЗІДЭНТА РЭСПУБЛІКІ БЕЛАРУСЬ" (Belarusian: 9 žniwnia 2020 VYBARY PRESIDENTA RESPUBLIKI BIEŁARUŚ lit. '9 August 2020 PRESIDENTIAL ELECTION IN BELARUS')

=== Siarhei Tsikhanouski and Sviatlana Tsikhanouskaya ===
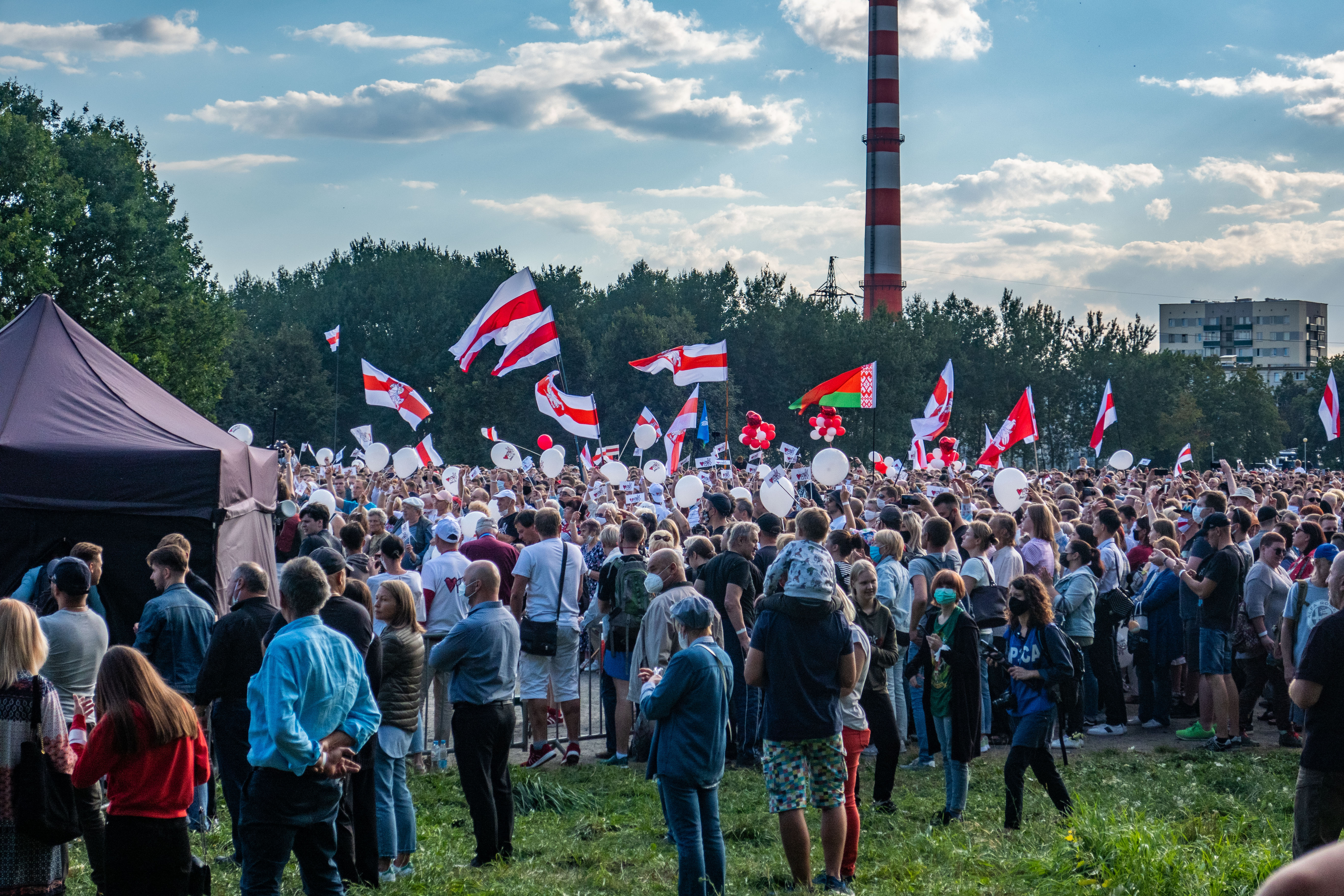
Rally in support of Tsikhanouskaya in Minsk on 30 July 2020

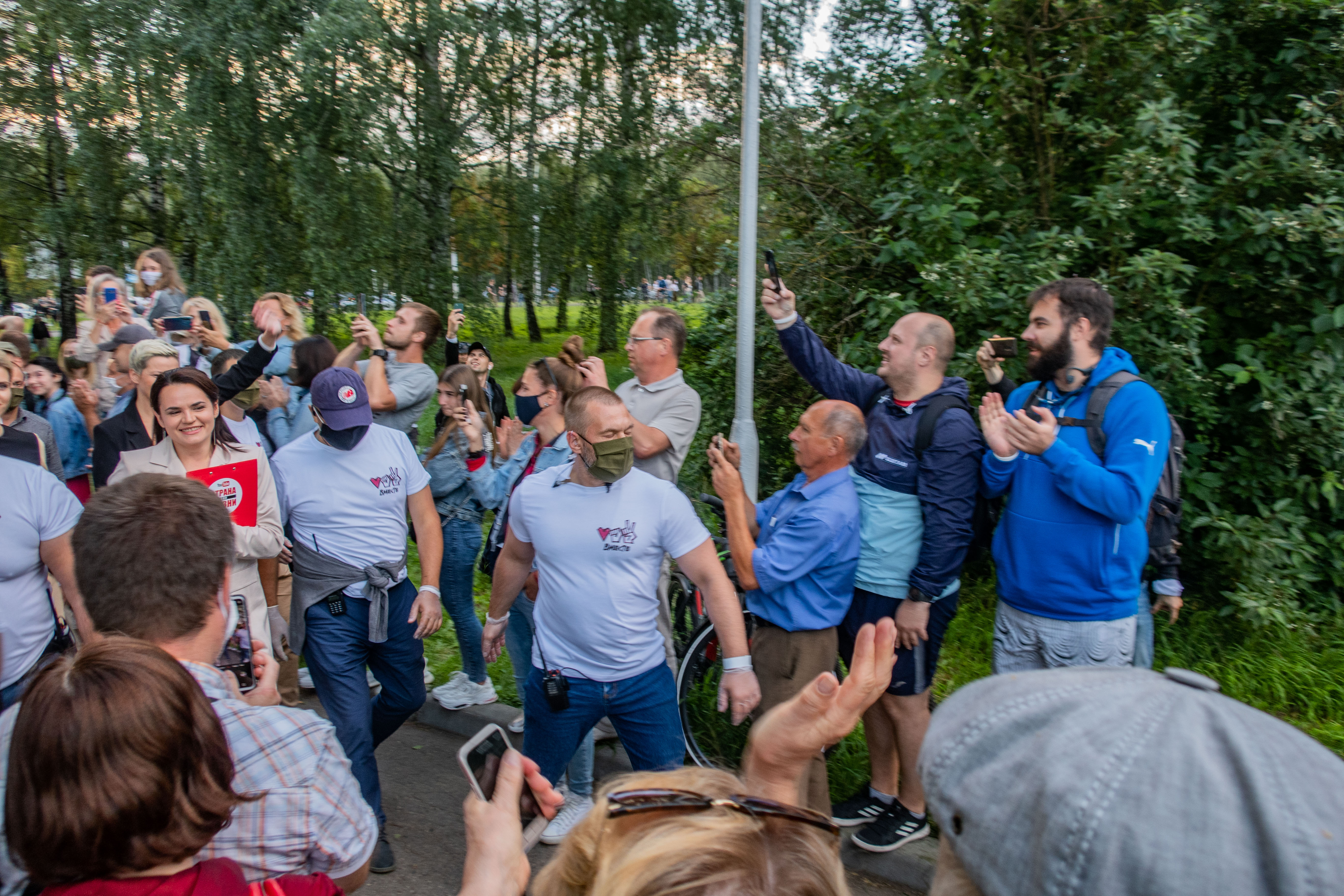
Rally in support of Tsikhanouskaya in Minsk on 30 July 2020. Tsikhanouskaya is on the left

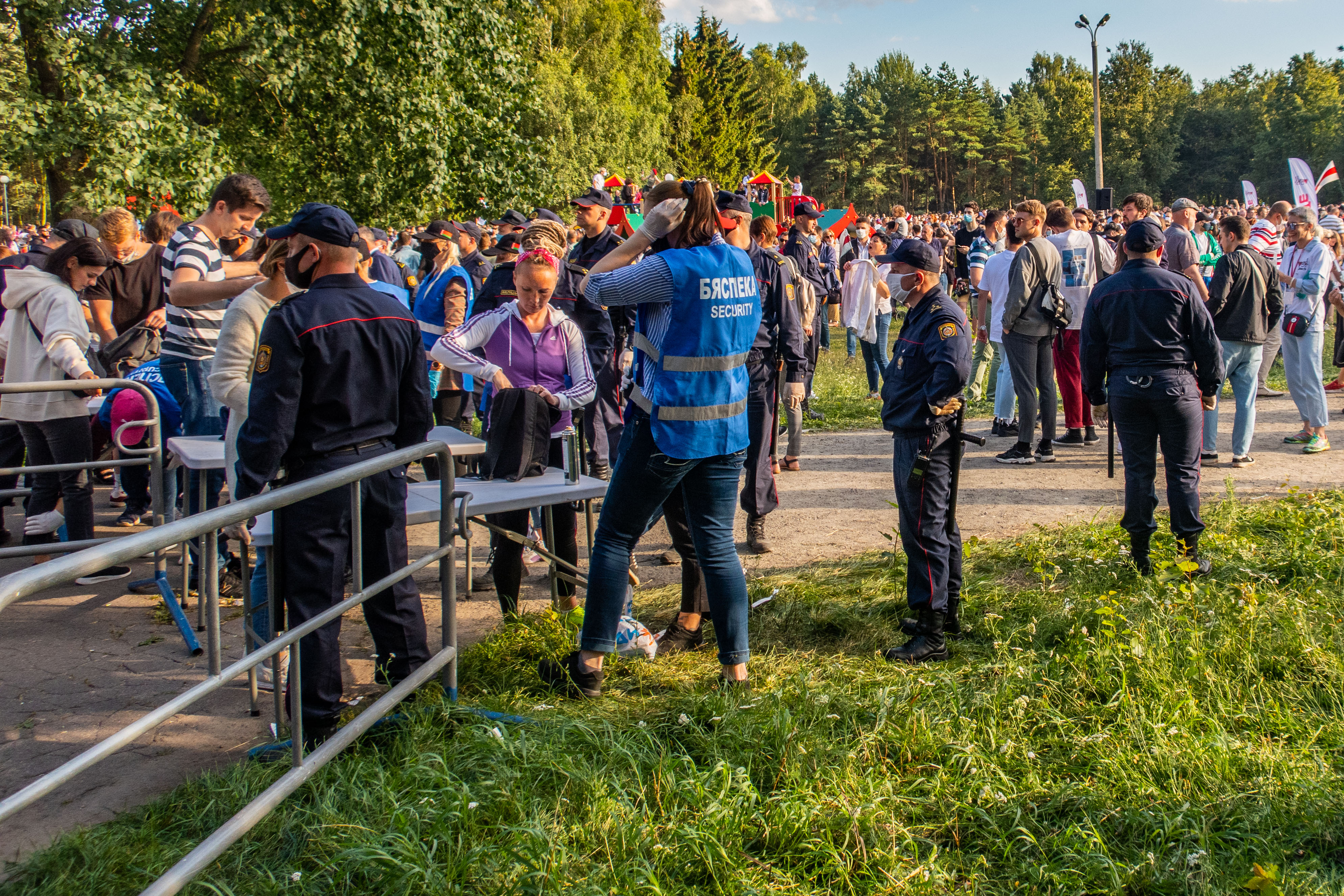
Rally in support of Tsikhanouskaya in Minsk on 30 July 2020. Security measures (taken after the arrest of 33 alleged Russian mercenaries)

On 6 May, Belarusian blogger and entrepreneur Syarhei Tsikhanouski has announced on his YouTube channel "Country for Life" that he intended to become a candidate in the presidential election.

The police officers refused to present identification (confirming that they were legitimate policemen) and threatened to break the windows of the car that Tsikhanouski was in. Prior to that, a crowd of Tsikhanouski's supporters in Mahilyow released a member of Tsikhanouski's team from the police. A day later, allies of Tsikhanouski were arrested, including a blogger from Slutsk, Uladzimier Niaronski. The Tsikhanouski's team, including Niaronski, were chased by road police and two minivans with members of the police special forces AMAP.

The blogger's arrest was due to his trips around Belarus that covered consequences of Lukashenko’s 26-year tenure as a president. The Tsikhanouski trips were popular and gathered hundreds of people who spoke out to him about violations of human rights and economic problems. During these trips, Tsikhanouski and his team were constantly chased by cars with people who were recording him and his activities; presumably they were employees of the Belarusian special services.

After the Tikhanovski was arrested, his supporters held a series of protests across the Belarus. According to Radio Liberty, 20 to 30 people were detained in Homiel, which is Tsikhanouski's hometown. Viasna Human Rights Centre reported that at least 19 of his supporters were brutally detained in Minsk.

After his arrest, Tsikhanouski was transported to Homiel, where he was placed in a temporary detention center. The formal reason for his detention was his participation in the rally against the integration of Belarus with Russia on 19 December 2019 in Minsk. After his detention, Tsikhanouski has announced on his YouTube channel his intention to run for president of Belarus. The video had recorded 250,000 views in 20 hours after the publication. The aforementioned YouTube channel had 276,000 subscribers as of 10 August. However, the Central Election Commission of Belarus refused to register the initiative group to nominate him.

His spouse, Sviatlana Tsikhanouskaya, decided to apply for election as a candidate, her initiative group was successfully registered by the Central Election Commission of Belarus. Tsikhanouski became the head of the initiative group to collect signatures for Tikhanovskaya's participation in the election.

On 20 May, Tsikhanouski was released from the temporary detention center. He explained that the pressure of activist supporters helped to achieve it. In an interview with Tsikhanouski after his release, Deutsche Welle drew parallels between the Belarusian blogger and Russian opposition leader Alexei Navalny and the Ukrainian actor Volodymyr Zelenskyy, who became the president of Ukraine. RTVI also drew a parallel between Tsikhanouski and Navalny.

Tsikhanouski then began travelling round the country to hold pickets in order to collect signatures for Tsikhanouskaya. Tsikhanouski's pickets were very popular and attracted thousands of people. The queue to the picket in Minsk near Kamarouski market was half a mile long. Several thousand people also attended the picket of Tsikhanouski in Homiel. Tsikhanouski announced that he was collecting signatures for fair election in Belarus.

Tsikhanouski uses the slogan "Stop the cockroach!" in his campaign, which is chanted by his supporters. The symbol of the campaign is a slipper. The slogan "Stop the cockroach!" refers to the fairy tale "Cockroach" by Soviet poet Kornei Chukovsky about how a "moustached cockroach" intimidated all the animals and became their ruler. Apparently, this slogan is a reference to Alexander Lukashenko. Slippers are supposedly a traditional means of pest control. Euronews journalists called the events in Belarus the "Slipper Revolution", demonstrating the quote of the Belarusian activist Franak Viačorka with this phrase.

On 29 May, Tsikhanouski visited Hrodna to collect signatures for his wife. On the same day, the head of Belarus Alexander Lukashenko alluded to Tsikhanouski at a meeting with workers of Minsk Tractor Works: "They come cool, all in jeeps — 10-12 cars... we know whose cars he drives, who finances it. We know where he comes from, what his citizenship is and stuff... We all know that. I'm already looking, they're giving me information, our people have already seen it." Tsikhanouski commented on Lukashenko's statement to the Nasha Niva newspaper: "My last name isn't there, but a hint of me: "We know his citizenship." They have information, analytical work! I have one citizenship, I never had any other. In terms of money — I've had business since 2005, I have money."

A few hours after Lukashenko's statement, when Tsikhanouski was talking with the residents of Hrodna, nearby there was a provocation, where a policeman fell by himself and was lying on the ground whistling. One minute and thirteen seconds later, Tsikhanouski was detained by OMON. Eight vans arrived to detain him. The soldiers of the special unit escorted Tsikhanouski into a police GAZelle van without showing their IDs. During the arrest, the van's door was broken. The blogger's supporters tried to stop the vans from leaving the place of detention. Unidentified people in tracksuits then cleared the way for the police transport to leave in a struggle with Tsikhanouski's supporters. The supporters then went to the police station in Hrodna to demand the blogger's release.

Shortly after Tsikhanouski's arrest, Belarusian state-owned TV channel Belarus 1 showed a story where the events in Hrodna were covered as follows: "From the very first minutes, this collection of signatures turned into a rally, and according to the law, it is prohibited to hold campaign meetings at this stage of the election campaign. As a result, this manner of communication turned into a scuffle. The police, trying to restore order, found themselves in the epicenter of the scuffle, which was arranged on the square. One of the police officers was attacked." The leader of the United Civil Party, retired lieutenant colonel of the Belarusian police, Mikalai Kazlou, noted that during his speech at Minsk Tractor Plant, Alexander Lukashenko "gave the command to screw, twist, throw in jail, and the minister immediately seized this opportunity and created a provocation". Kazlou also noted that all the policemen involved in this provocation would be exposed and brought to justice.

According to the Vesna Human Rights Centre, at least 13 people were detained, including two members of Tsikhanouskaya's initiative group and three assistants of Tsikhanouski. The Ministry of Internal Affairs of Belarus announced that investigators had opened a criminal case for violence against police officers.

Tsikhanouskaya made an official statement regarding the detention of her husband and the head of the headquarters of her initiative group in Hrodna: "I officially declare: Today, 29 May, during a picket in Hrodna in support of my candidacy for the presidency there was a "dirty" provocation against Syarhei Leanidovich Tsikhanouski, head of the headquarters of my initiative group. He was detained. I declare responsibly that the picket was legal and peaceful. In connection with this, I demand the immediate release of the head of my initiative group, otherwise, I will regard it as a violation of my constitutional rights and pressure on me as a candidate for the presidency of Belarus". She promised to submit relevant applications to the CEC and the Interior Ministry.

The first two mass rallies after registration by the Tsikhanouskaya campaign were held on 19 July in Banhalore Square in Minsk and the city of Dzyarzhynsk with an audience of around 7,500. She was joined on stage by Babaryka's campaign manager Maryja Kalesnikava and Tsepkalo's wife Veranika as they had announced earlier that they would merge their campaigns.

Local governments cancelled several campaign events that Tsikhanouskaya had planned to hold in the run-up to the elections.

=== Alexander Lukashenko ===
According to a 2025 analysis of the election campaign, crisis performance played a significant role in Lukashenko's communication strategy. Lukashenko's 2020 presidential election campaign initially followed his traditional crisis-centric approach from late May, featuring regional meetings, public appearances, and media propaganda that framed global events and domestic issues as crises. This mirrored the populist tactic of elevating "failure to crisis" to justify decisive action. However, June marked a significant shift. The campaign's second stage focused on consolidating incumbents and siloviki, a display of organizational power unprecedented since 1994. This phase included the political program "Razam za Bielaruś," an address to the Belarusian people and National Assembly (in which Lukashenko showed violent global scenes to a large gathering of officials, signalling consolidated power), and a YouTube interview with Dmitry Gordon.

=== "Female Solidarity" ===
Before the 2020 presidential election, Alexander Lukashenko insisted that Belarus is not ready for a woman to be president. On 17 July 2020, the three women representing the main opposition candidates (Tsikhanouskaya, Tsepkalo's wife Veronica and Babaryka's campaign manager Maryja Kalesnikava) merged their campaigns, pitting "Female Solidarity" to fight Lukashenko.

=== Pressure by authorities ===
Viktar Babaryka was detained on 18 June during the reported arrest of several hundred opposition supporters. Charges of embezzlement and fraud have been brought against Babaryka, who is currently being held in a State Security Committee detention centre in Minsk.

Valery Tsepkalo, who was not allowed to register as a candidate, and has "gone to Moscow with his children, fearing for his safety". During an interview, Tsepkalo mentioned that his friends in law enforcement agencies warned "an order had gone out for my arrest". Tsepkalo said he planned to give press conferences in Russia, Ukraine, Western Europe and the United States to expose "the true nature of the Belarusian regime." His wife, Veronika Tsepkalo, is remaining in Belarus to help the campaign of Lukashenko's main competitor in the election, Sviatlana Tsikhanouskaya.

In June, Sviatlana Tsikhanouskaya released a video saying that she had been threatened with arrest, and her children being taken away if she continued to campaign. She had to send her children abroad to live with their grandmother for their safety. The children of opposition candidates have been taken away before and put into state orphanages.

According to Belarusian Electoral Code (articles 45 and 45^{1}), local authorities have to determine some outdoor sites for rallies and meetings, where mass events are possible. In Minsk, the authorities allowed six sites to be used for this purpose (none of them in the city centre) while only one site was usually allocated in each of the small towns. During the 2020 election, the authorities and confidants of Lukashenko widely used booking of these sites to prevent independent candidates to meet with people. In Pinsk (Brest region), local authorities provided only one site for meetings with candidates, and this site was booked by a confidant of Lukashenko (Tacciana Lugina, mayor of Pinsk) from 24 July to 8 August. Due to this, Tsikhanouskaya failed to visit Pinsk on 2 August. In Stolin (Brest region), the only site was booked by Lugina too from 27 July to 8 August every day from 8 a.m. to 10 p.m.

On 4 August, Tsikhanouskaya planned to visit Slutsk and Salihorsk (Minsk region). On 3 August, local authorities of Slutsk informed the confidant of Tsikhanouskaya that the meeting couldn't be held due to "urgent repair" of the only provided site, but they didn't provide the alternative site (as required by law). The meeting in Salihorsk was also cancelled by the authorities at the last moment. The people who gathered in Slutsk and Salihorsk were asked to leave and those who refused were arrested. Meetings with another independent candidate Andrey Dmitriyeu in Liepiel and Polatsk (Viciebsk region) were cancelled at the last moment for similar reasons.

On 6 August, Tsikhanouskaya was forced to cancel a previously announced rally in Minsk due to full booking at all six sites in the city that were made available by the authorities. Instead, she, with Veranika Tsepkalo and Maryja Kalesnikava, visited one of the booked sites and invited people to join them, but the policemen did not allow three of them to come in. During the event, DJs put the song "[We Want] Changes!" by Viktor Tsoi and thus supported Tsikhanouskaya. They were later sentenced to detention for 10 days.

On 8 August, Maryja Maroz (campaign manager of Tsikhanouskaya) and Maryja Kalesnikava (see above) were arrested, but Kalesnikava was freed a few hours later.

=== Solidarity ===
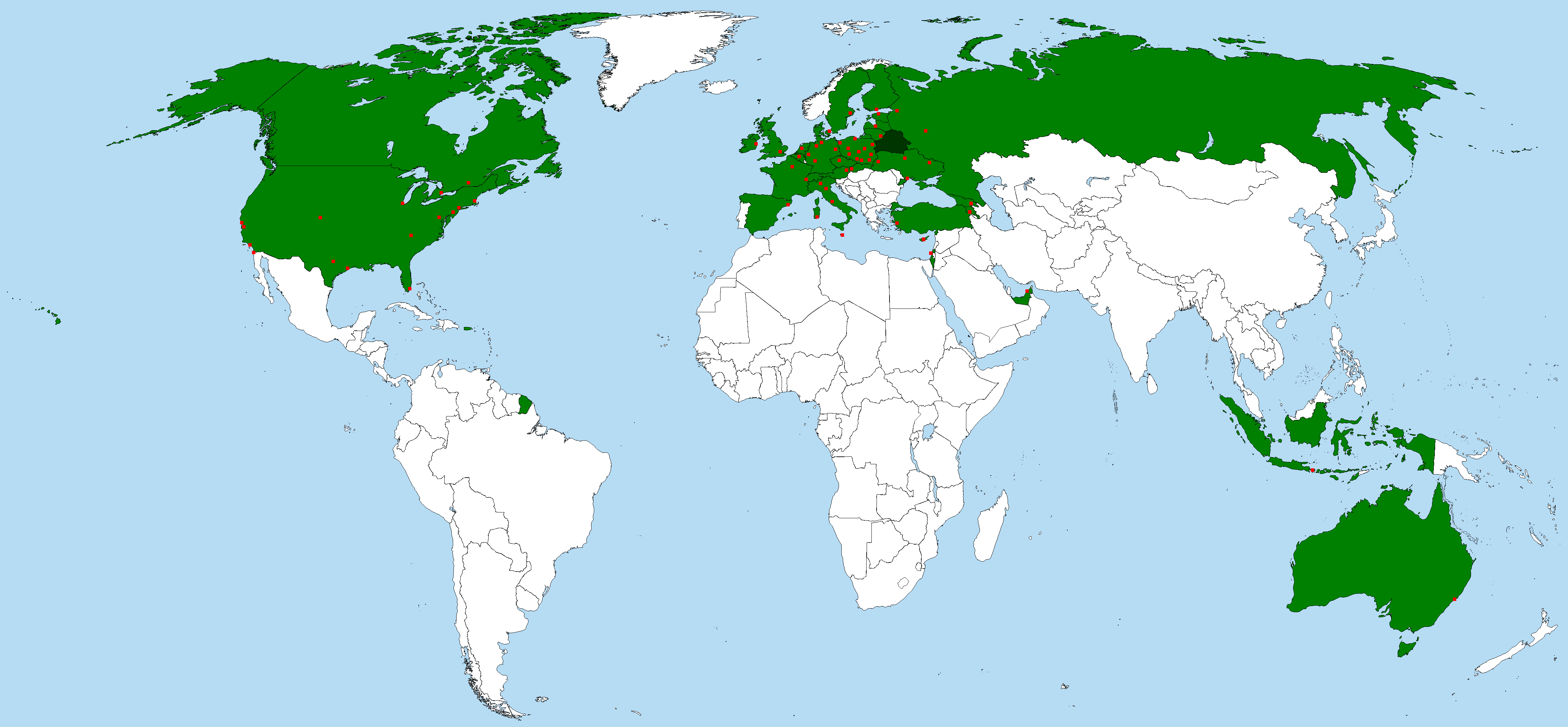
Map of demonstrations in solidarity with the Belarusian opposition

Demonstrations in solidarity with the Belarusian opposition have been held in more than 20 countries and in more than 30 cities around the world.

== Opinion polls ==
According to a poll conducted back in March–April 2020 by the Institute of Sociology of the National Academy of Sciences of Belarus, the level of trust of current Lukashenko in the capital city of Belarus is 24%. At the same time, 11% of the poll participants trust the Central Election Commission.

The state-affiliated analytical center "Ecoom" commissioned by the state TV channel ONT, which was criticized for its biased coverage of the election campaign , conducted a sociological survey of electoral moods and preferences of citizens. According to this data, incumbent President Alexander Lukashenko enjoyed support of 72.3% of citizens. At the same time, no more than 10% in total were ready to vote for the remaining candidates.

Opinion polling in Belarus requires a government license. Media outlets are also banned from conducting online polls regarding the election.

== Conduct ==
The Organization for Security and Co-operation in Europe reported that it would not be monitoring the 2020 election as it had not been sent a timely invitation. It had not recognised any elections in Belarus as free and fair since 1995. Only Russia and Azerbaijan were participating as international observers during the election. On 4 August 2020, the first day of early voting in the election, the CEC reported a turnout of almost 5%. However, independent observers disputed this figure and claimed that it was inflated.

External images
- Vote cabin without curtain
- Vote cabin with a deliberately drawn curtain

In several polling stations, curtains were deliberately removed from the vote cabins, leaving them covered on only three sides.

A few days prior to the election, a number of journalists and bloggers were arrested on weak and spurious charges, or were denied accreditation to cover the elections, bringing the total to over 100 arrests made since January. It was thought that the government wants to reduce external scrutiny of the election.

Honest People, an independent association in Belarus that monitors elections, reported having found 5096 violations from observers. They also questioned the election commission's reported turnout statistics. The group said that around 70 election observers were detained.

== Results ==
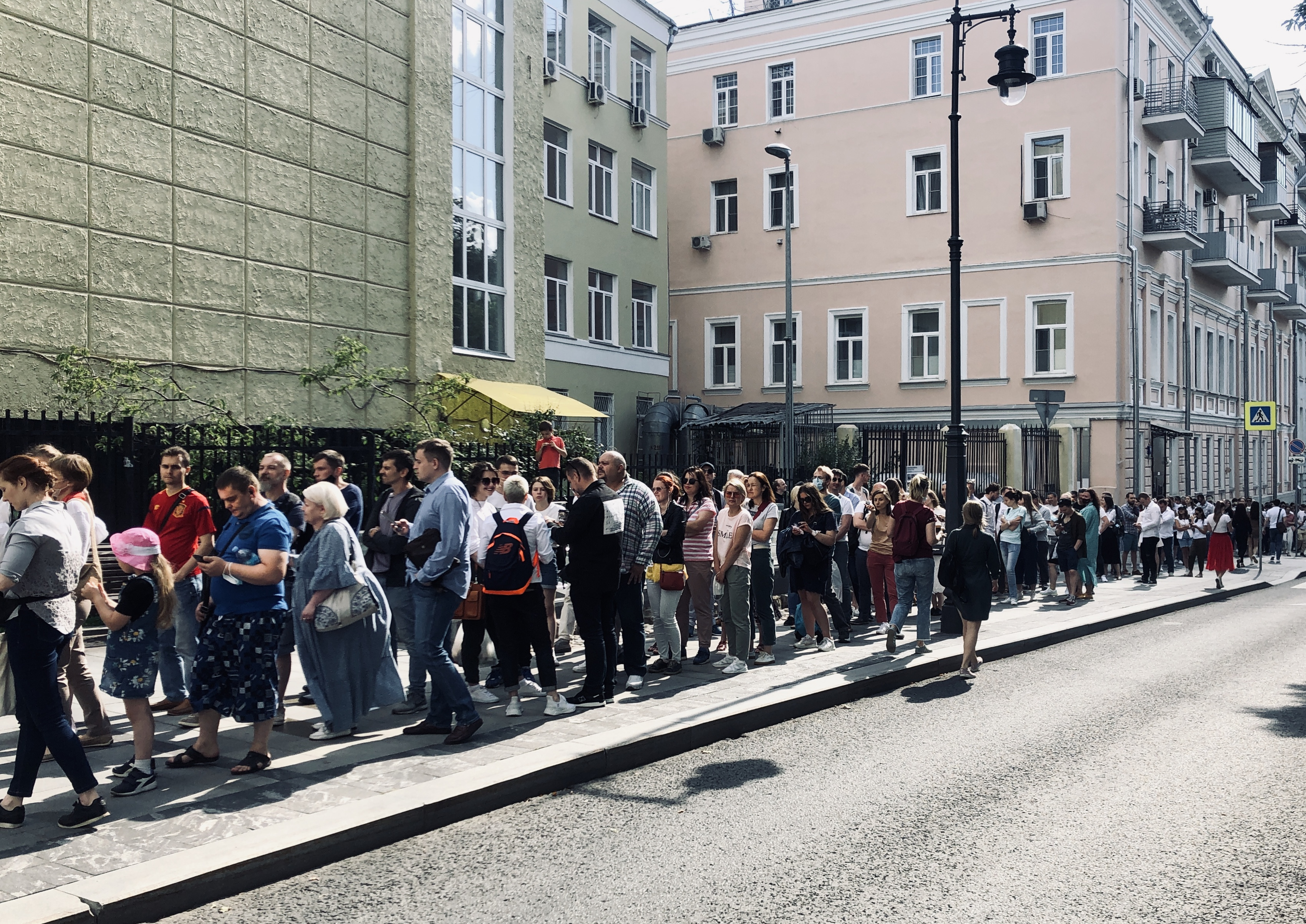
The queue of voters at the embassy of Belarus in Moscow, Russia

Turnout was said to be 4.98% on 4 August, 12.75% on 5 August, 22.47% on 6 August, and 32.24% on 7 August. On 9 August, turnout was reported to be 84.05% at 20:00, more than the 50% required to validate the election.

The result of the vote, "as in previous elections, was never in any real doubt" and had a "foregone nature" according to The New York Times, stating that Lukashenko "controls vote counting, [and abused] a vast security apparatus and a noisy state media machine unwavering in its support for him and contempt for his rivals." Tsikhanouskaya, the principal challenger, was stated to have gone into hiding in Minsk after security agents detained at least eight members of her campaign staff on the day of the election.

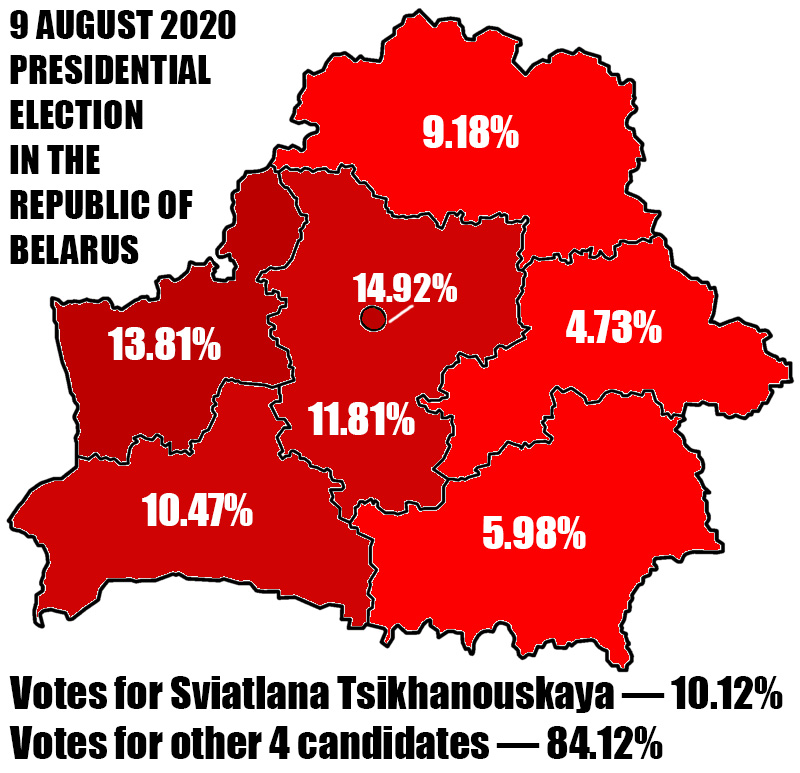
Map of official results by Tsikhanouskaya's vote share

Candidate	Party	Votes	%
Alexander Lukashenko	Independent	4,661,075	81.04
Sviatlana Tsikhanouskaya	Independent	588,619	10.23
Hanna Kanapatskaya	Independent	97,489	1.69
Andrey Dmitriyeu	Independent	70,671	1.23
Siarhei Cherachen	Belarusian Social Democratic Assembly	66,613	1.16
Against all		267,363	4.65
Total		5,751,830	100.00
Valid votes		5,751,830	98.85
Invalid/blank votes		67,125	1.15
Total votes		5,818,955	100.00
Registered voters/turnout		6,904,649	84.28
Source: Central Election Commission

=== Protocols of the polling stations ===
Once the votes have been duly counted, polling stations in Belarus write a "Protocol" (report) which sums up the election tallies. The Protocol is then displayed for passers-by.

People took photos of the protocols, which testified that in many stations in the Minsk capital, and in foreign consulates, the support for Tsikhanouskaya was roughly equal or even several times higher than of Lukashenko.

Belarusian political scientist Valer Karbalevich stated that the local protocols and final results are completely uncorrelated.

Although the Electoral Code of Belarus requires to hang out the protocols on every voting station (article 55), it was reported that some stations didn't make them public. The Central Electoral Commission of Belarus stated that no such info was known and reported that there are no specific requirements to the procedure of announcement of the local protocols. While responding to complaints, the Committee announced that it cannot publish the protocols once again, adding that they were delivered to regional committees only, which disbanded after the announcement of final results.

Although the voting papers should be kept for 6 months, a Brest-based human rights activist obtained a big bale of partially burned voting papers a few days after the election: according to him, they were to be burned in the boiler room.

=== Internet initiatives ===
==== Self-counting ====
Results of votes by voblasc counted by the Voice (Holas) platform

Results of votes by district counted by the Voice (Holas) platform

Votes sent to the Voice platform
Candidate	Votes submitted	With photo	%
Sviatlana Tsikhanouskaya	1 003 717	536 546	95.65%
Alexander Lukashenko	10 100	658	0.96%
Andrey Dmitriyeu	6 778	2 047	0.64%
Siarhei Cherachen	3 724	1 201	0.35%
Hanna Kanapatskaya	2 491	688	0.23%
Against all candidates	18 137	4 357	1.72%
Planned to not attend to cast vote	2 685	-	0.25%
Planned to spoil ballot	1 712	450	0.16%
Total	1 049 334	545 947	100%

The Voice (Russian: Голос, romanized: Golos, Belarusian: Голас, romanized: Holas) initiative invited Belarusian citizens to submit photographs of both sides of their voting papers, together with their voting bureau locations. The aim was to make all photographs available as a public photographic database, enabling cross-checks against the official results.

On 15 August 2020, Voice claimed to have had 1,248,714 valid voting papers recorded, about 18% of the voting population. As of 28 August 2020, Voice updated its count to 1,049,334 unique confirmed votes recorded, with 545,947 verified ballot photos.

==== Protocols vs official data and photographs ====
On 21 August 2020, a final report by the Voice, partnering with the "Zubr" and "Honest People" platforms analyzed polling station results. For 1310 out of the total of 5767 polling stations, there were photographs of the protocols.

Summary by Voice
Polling stations			Votes for Lukashenko	Votes for Tsikhanouskaya
With official data	where Lukashenko led	1115	66.6%	20.4%
With official data	where Tsikhanouskaya led	195	31.3%	56.7%
With official data	total	1310	61.7%	25.4%
Without official data		4457	88.5%†	2.97%†
Without official data		4457	† what would be required for consistency with the CEC results	

The Voice report on the analysis of the official data, calculated that if both official results and photographs were correct, then at the polling stations where comparison was not possible (4457 out of 5847), Tsikhanouskaya would have to have had about 3% support. At the stations for which data were published, she received (according to Voice's analysis of the official data) 25% of the votes overall, split into 57% in the voting areas where she led, and 20% in those where she trailed. Voice described these differences as "extreme anomalies".

== Aftermath ==
After state TV revealed the results of an exit poll showing a landslide Lukashenko victory, clashes between protesters and riot police broke out in Minsk. Reports of injuries and the use of stun grenades and rubber bullets emerged.

The main opposition candidate, Sviatlana Tsikhanouskaya, said in a news conference that she did not trust the exit poll, saying, "I believe my eyes, and I see that the majority is with us".

As polling closed many internet service providers lost routing, the communication losses were widespread as police and military closed down most of Minsk.

On the second night after the very likely falsified results were announced, protesters barricaded the area around the Rīga market. Security forces responded by tear-gassing the protesters and using flashbangs.

After being released from a seven-hour-long detention on election night following her submission of a formal complaint to the Central Election Commission (CEC), Sviatlana Tsikhanouskaya was escorted by Belarusian security services to Lithuania, reportedly a condition of a deal securing the release of her campaign manager, Maria Moroz.

On 11 August, Tsikhanouskaya released a video reading from a script following her detainment, seemingly filmed under duress and promoted on state-sponsored media, in which she called upon the people of Belarus to stop protesting and accept the victory of Lukashenko. The strong change in message and demeanor of Tsikhanouskaya post-detainment led allies to insist the video was coerced, likening it to a hostage video. She had previously sent her children abroad before the elections for their safety. On 14 August, Tikhanovskaya, now in Lithuania, published another video in which she claimed to have won the presidential election with between 60 and 70% of the vote, more than enough to defeat Lukashenko outright. She called for the creation of a transitional council of "civil society activists, respected Belarusians and professionals" to handle the transfer of power from Lukashenko. She also encouraged her supporters to sign an online petition calling for a recount of the election.

Arrests and violence against protesters, including claims of torture, increased in the week after the election resulting in calls for international sanctions against the perpetrators. On August 14, 2020, the Belarus Solidarity Foundation (BYSOL) was established. Its main aims are to support courtyard initiatives, emergency relocation, support for the families of political prisoners and helping those fired for political reasons. In 2020, BYSOL raised €2.9 million to support those fired for political reasons, striking factories, and people forced to relocate.

On 19 August, the Belarusian Central Election Committee said that Mr Lukashenko would be inaugurated as president for a new term within the next two months.

On 16 November 2020, the BBC reported that more than 1,000 people were arrested during the demonstrations in Belarus, over the disputed presidential election. The police fired rubber bullets at protesters and also used tear gas to disperse the crowd.

=== Deaths ===
29-year-old Konstantin Shishmakov, director of the Volkovysk Military History Museum named after Bagration, disappeared on 15 August. He refused to sign the protocol of the election commission, called his wife at about 5 PM local time and said: "I will not work here anymore; I am going home." He was later found dead.

== International reactions ==
International reactions to Lukashenko's re-election Belarus Congratulated Lukashenko Recognised Tsikhanouskaya as winner Not recognised result Expressed criticism over conflict escalation No reaction

Countries and organisations have voiced their opinions with some accepting and some rejecting the election result. Many have commented about the protests with more condemning the violence.

Countries and organisations resolving to impose sanctions:

- (European Union) EU High Representative for Foreign Affairs and Security Policy Josep Borrell on 14 August announced that the EU would bring in sanctions against Belarusian officials responsible for "violence and falsification". Charles Michel, President of the European Council went further on 19 August saying the EU would soon impose sanctions on a "substantial number" of individuals responsible for violence, repression, and election fraud. The European Commission announced it would divert 53 million euros (£48m) earmarked for Belarus away from the government and towards civil society.
- (Lithuania) On 18 August 2020, the Lithuanian parliament agreed to impose economic sanctions against the Belarusian government.
- On 19 August 2020, the Prime Minister of Slovakia stated that the Government of Slovakia introduced sanctions against the Belarusian government in the new legislative session.

== See also ==
- President of Belarus
- Belarusian partisan movement (2020–present)
- Coordination Council (Belarus)
