= Maksim Tank Belarusian State Pedagogical University =

Public university in Minsk, Belarus

Coordinates: 53°53′40″N 27°32′42″E

- Беларускі Дзяржаўны Педагагічны Універсiтэт імя Максіма Танка
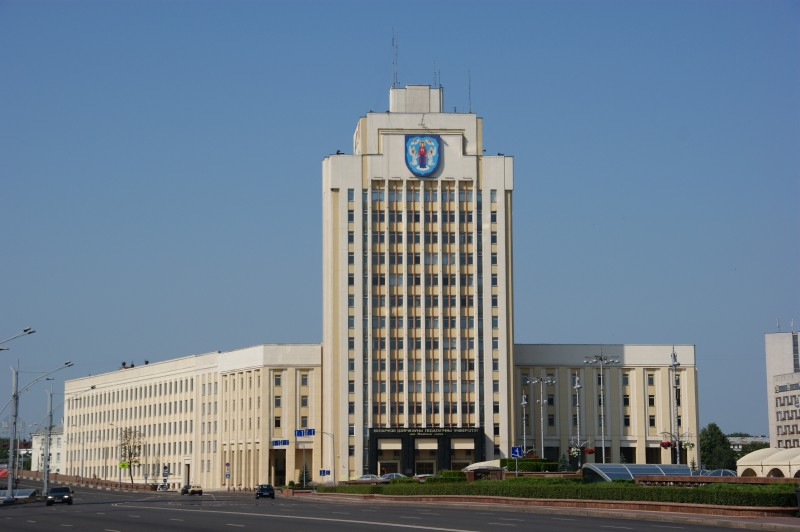
- The main building of the BSPU
- Type: Public
- Established: 1914
- Rector: Alexander I. Zhuk
- Academic staff: 12
- Administrative staff: 1373
- Students: 19,977
- Location: Minsk, Belarus
- Campus: 8 dormitories
- Website: bspu.by

Maksim Tank Belarusian State Pedagogical University also known as BSPU (Belarusian: Беларускі дзяржаўны педагагічны ўніверсітэт імя Максіма Танка, romanized: Bielaruski dziaržaŭny piedahahičny ŭniviersitet imia Maksima Tanka) is a university in Minsk, Belarus. It specialises in teacher training of mathematics, chemistry, physics, psychology, geography, history, languages and others for primary and secondary schools.

== History ==
Minsk State Pedagogical University (first name - Minsk Teachers Institute) admitted his first students in 1914. For a long period the institution was reorganised into a pedagogical department of Belarusian State University. After being a part of another university for ten years the Decree of the Ministry of People's Commissars of the BSSR proclaimed the Pedagogical Department of Belarusian State University an independent Belarusian State Pedagogical higher institution named after the Soviet author Maxim Gorky in 1936.

In 1993 after Belarus achieved its independence and in frames of the policy of the development of sovereign educational system the institute got a status of the university. Two years later the university was renamed after the Belarusian Soviet poet Maksim Tank. Since 2007 the university is a member of the Eurasian Association of Universities.

== Structure ==
=== Departments ===
There are 12 departments (and a number of subdepartments) within the university structure:

- Department of History
- Physics and Mathematics Department
- Pre-university Training Department
- Department of Pre-school Education
- Natural Science Department
- Physical Education Department
- Primary Education Department
- Psychology Department
- Philology Department
- Social Education Department
- Social-Pedagogical Technologies Department
- Aesthetical Education Department

== Notable alumni ==
- Yana Arabeika
- Uladzimir Nyaklyayew
- Uladzimir Sodal
- Alhierd Bacharevič
- Tatsiana Karatkevich
