= Cheremkhovo =

Town in Irkutsk Oblast, Russia

Cheremkhovo Черемхово
- Town
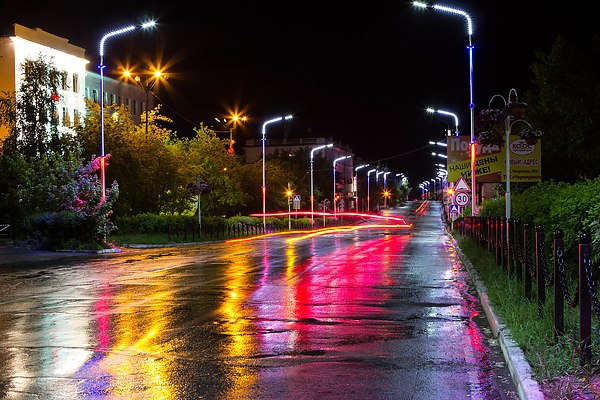
- Cheremkhovo at night

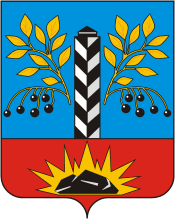
- Flag Coat of arms
- Interactive map of Cheremkhovo
- Location of Cheremkhovo Cheremkhovo (Irkutsk Oblast)
- Coordinates: 53°09′N 103°05′E
- Country: Russia
- Federal subject: Irkutsk Oblast
- Founded: 1772
- Elevation: 560 m (1,840 ft)

Population (2010 Census)
  - Total: 52,647
  - Estimate (2025): 52,879 (+0.4%)
  - Rank: 310th in 2010

Administrative status
  - Subordinated to: Town of Cheremkhovo
  - Capital of: Cheremkhovsky District, Town of Cheremkhovo

Municipal status
  - Urban okrug: Cheremkhovo Urban Okrug
  - Capital of: Cheremkhovo Urban Okrug, Cheremkhovsky Municipal District
- Time zone: UTC+8 (MSK+5)
- Postal code: 665400
- OKTMO ID: 25745000001
- Website: admcher.ru

Cheremkhovo (Russian: Черемхо́во, IPA: [tɕɪrʲɪmˈxovə]; Buryat: Шэрэмхэ, Şeremkhe) is a town in Irkutsk Oblast, Russia, located on the Trans-Siberian Railway.

== History ==
Cheremkhovo was founded as the village in 1772.

== Administrative and municipal status ==
Within the framework of administrative divisions, Cheremkhovo serves as the administrative center of Cheremkhovsky District, even though it is not a part of it. As an administrative division, it is incorporated separately as the Town of Cheremkhovo—an administrative unit with the status equal to that of the districts. As a municipal division, the Town of Cheremkhovo is incorporated as Cheremkhovo Urban Okrug.

== Economy ==
The town is one of the coal-mining towns in the Irkutsk coal basin.

== Notable people ==
- Uladzimir Mackievič (born 1956), Belarusian philosopher, social and political activist, political prisoner
- Evgeny Vyborov (1953–2025), bandy player and coach
