= Igor Marzalyuk =

Belarusian politician (born 1968)

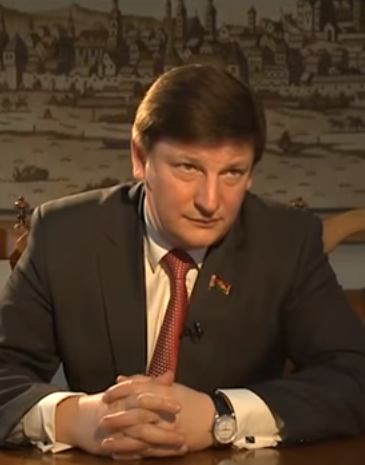
- Marzalyuk in 2015

Member of the House of Representatives
- Incumbent
- Assumed office 11 October 2016
- Constituency: Mogilevsky-Leninsky

Member of the Council of the Republic
- In office 23 September 2012 – 11 October 2016
- Constituency: Mogilev region

Personal details
- Born: 11 September 1968 (age 57)

Igor Alexandrovich Marzalyuk (Russian: Игорь Александрович Марзалюк; born 11 September 1968) is a Belarusian politician serving as a member of the House of Representatives since 2016. From 2012 to 2016, he was a member of the Council of the Republic.
