= Siarhei Skrabets =

Belarusian politician

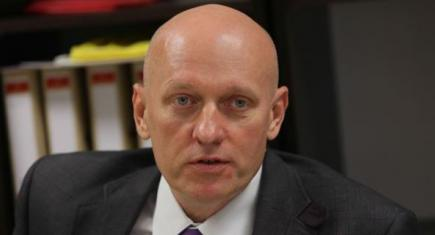
- Belarusian politician
- Born: 25 October 1963 (age 62); Lida, Byelorussian SSR, Soviet Union (now Belarus)
- Education: Belarusian National Technical University, Belarusian State University
- Occupations: Chemical engineer, lawyer

Siarhei Mikalayevich Skrabets (Belarusian: Сяргей Мiкалаевiч Скрабец; Russian: Сергей Николаевич Скребец; born 25 October 1963) is a Belarusian politician and the public figure. He was deputy of the House of Representatives of Belarus in the second election, floor leader of the opposition parliament group Republiс, leader of the Belarusian Social Democratic Party (Svaboda), chairman of the commission of penology of Belarusian Helsinki Committee, and a participant of the presidential election in 2001 and 2006.

== Biography ==
Skrabets was born in 1963 in Lida. He has two higher education. He graduated Belarusian National Technical University and Belarusian State University.

1985-1990 - process engineer, the Research Institute of Automation Facilities (AGAT), Minsk.

1990-1991 - sales manager, technological center "Minsk-Partner", Minsk.

1991-1992 - head of commercial and marketing department, Republic staff of student divisions. Head of commercial and marketing department, Employment service of youth and students.

1993-1997 - sales manager, joint venture "TEYKOF", Minsk.

1997-2000 - general director, the closed joint-stock company "Trade house Bel-Babaevskoe".

2000-2004 - deputy of the House of Representatives of Belarus, vice-chairman of budget, finance and tax politic committee. From May 2003 floor leader of the opposition parliament group Republiс.

== Political activity ==
He was running for president in the 2001 presidential elections of Belarus. In summer 2004 he took part in the hunger strike of the “Respublika” deputies (Vladimir Parfenovich, Siarheyi Skrabets and general Valeriy Frolov), who demanded democratization of the Electoral Code.

He has been the chairman of the central organizing committee of Belarusian Social Democratic Party (Freedom) since 2009.

A criminal case was opened against Skrebets on suspicion of organizing a criminal group. He was detained in May, 2005. The prosecutor's office brought a criminal case against the former deputy under two articles of the Criminal Code: article 13 part 1 (preparation to a crime). 1 (preparation to a crime) and Art 431 part 2 (preparation to bribery). On September 13, 2005 the former deputy was charged with one more crime - illegal participation in entrepreneurial activity. In protest against the charges, Skrebets held four hunger strikes, one of which lasted 40 days. All of the charges practically fell apart as a result of court hearings.

In December 2005 the Central Election Commission registered an initiative group for collecting signatures for the nomination of Sergey Skrabets as a presidential candidate. It was headed by the politician's brother Aliaksandr Skrabets. At that time Skrebets himself was in the investigative isolator of Minsk City Executive Committee #1. In total Skrebets collected 101,618 signatures. (as of January 26, 2006) At the end of January 2006 he withdrew his candidacy in favor of another candidate - ex-rector of Belarusian State University Alexander Kazulin.

On February 14, 2006, Siarhei Skrabets was sentenced to two and a half years of jail. An amnesty was applied to Siarhei Skrebets, in connection with which his sentence was reduced by a year. He was released on November 15, 2006 after a year and a half of imprisonment. During his imprisonment, Sergei Skrebets lost 30 kilos of weight.

In February 2007 he announced his intention to create a new youth democratic movement and to hold a constituent conference of a new opposition youth movement named after Kastus Kalinouski.

On April 15, 2007, at the sixth report-election convention of the Belarusian Social Democratic Gromada, he was elected to the Central Council and the Executive Committee of the Party of Belarusian Social Democratic Gromada headed by Stanislav Shushkevich.

In August 2007, he headed the Minsk city organization of the Belarusian Social Democratic Gromada.

Since July 2008, he was elected First Deputy Chairman of the Belarusian Social Democratic Gromada.

Since March 2009, he has been the Chairman of the Central Organizing Committee of Belarusian Social Democratic Party "Liberty".

From March 2010 to February 28, 2016 he was General Secretary of Belarusian Social Democratic Party (Narodnaya Gromada)

Tried to run as a presidential candidate in the 2020 presidential election, but later withdrew his candidacy.

== Awards ==
Winner of the "Charter'97" National Human Rights Defense Award in the category "For Personal Courage in Defense of Human Rights," 2005. Winner of the 2019 František Alechnovič Prize established by the Belarusian PEN Center and the Belarusian editorial board Радыё Свабода for his book The Price of Freedom, 2019.
