= Siarhei Cherachen =

Belarusian politician and entrepreneur

- Born: 8 May 1985 (age 41); Krychaw, Mogilev Region, Byelorussian Soviet Socialist Republic, Soviet Union (now Belarus)
- Education: Belarusian State University
- Occupations: politician, entrepreneur
- Years active: 2004 – present
- Known for: Presidential candidate in the 2020 Belarusian presidential election
- Office: Chairman of the Belarusian Social Democratic Assembly
- Term: 2018 – present
- Political party: Communist Party of Belarus (2016 – 2018); Belarusian Social Democratic Assembly (2018 – present)

Siarhei Uladzimiravich Cherachen (Belarusian: Сярге́й Уладзі́міравіч Чэ́рачэнь, also known as Sergey Vladimirovich Cherechen Russian: Сергей Владимирович Черечень; born 8 May 1985) is a Belarusian businessman, politician and candidate in the 2020 Belarusian presidential election. He is the current chairman of the Belarusian Social Democratic Assembly.

== Biography ==
Cherachen was born on 8 May 1985 in the late Soviet era in Krychaw, Mogilev. He grew up and raised up in Mogilev where he also completed his primary and secondary education.

== Career ==
He graduated from the Belarusian State University in the field of informatics and radio electronics. After his graduation, he pursued his career in business and later joined the mainstream politics. In 2018, he became chairman of the Hramada, succeeding Stanislav Shushkevich.

=== 2020 presidential election ===
On 12 January 2020, he was nominated as a presidential candidate from the party for the 2020 Belarusian presidential election.

On 10 August 2020, the election results were released and Cherachen received the fewest votes among the five candidates, with a total valid vote count of 1.15%.

=== 2025 presidential election ===
Cherachen announced that he will run for presidency in the next election in 2025.

He was unable to do so because of the new age limit for participating in the presidential election.
