= Metallurg Bratsk =

Metallurg
- City: Bratsk, Russia
- Founded: 2000
- Folded: 2008

Metallurg (Russian: Металлург) was a professional bandy club in Bratsk, Russia founded in 2000. Metallurg played their matches at Metallurg Stadium and folded in 2008.

In the 2004–05 Russian Bandy League, Metallurg advanced to the play-offs, but lost to Vodnik in the Round of 16.
