= Tell the Truth! =

Belarusian pro-democracy and anti-corruption campaign

Tell the Truth! (Belarusian: Гавары праўду, Havary Praŭdu) is a campaign in Belarus that was started on 25 February 2010 by educational and research institution "Movement Forward" and is supported by a number of public figures.

Belarusian poet Uladzimir Niaklajeu is the founder and former leader of the campaign. For a long time, the campaign's stated goal was to collect and disseminate factual information about the state of affairs in society and the state. Six months after its founding, Niaklajeu announce that the campaign's true goal is victory in the 2010 Belarusian presidential election.

In May 2010, dozens of activists of the campaign were subjected to persecution by Belarusian authorities.

The campaign has become a basis for nominating Uladzimir Niaklajeu as a candidate on presidential elections of 2010 and it continued after the end of the elections.

== Founding ==
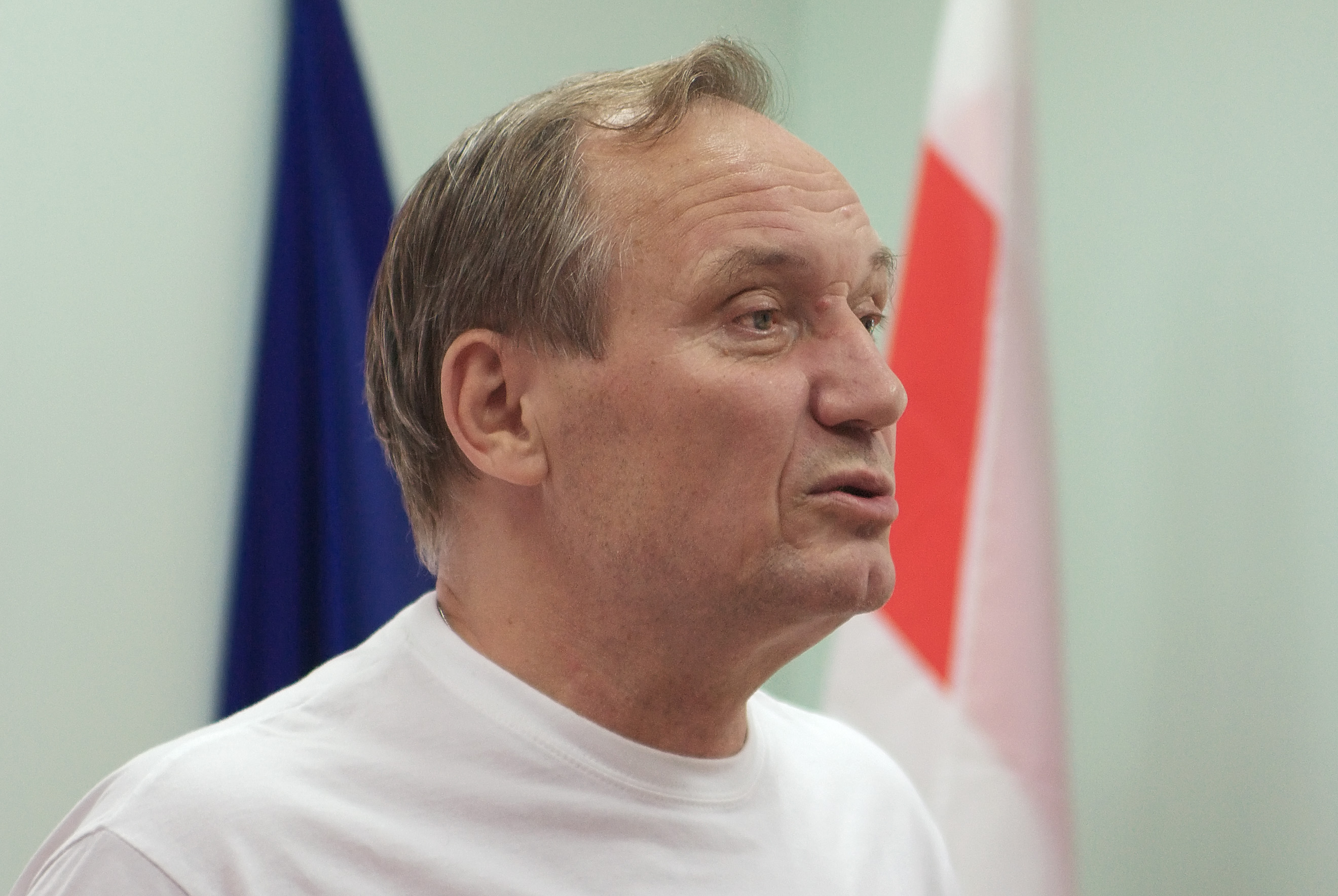
Founder and leader of the campaign Uladzimir Niaklajeu

The concept of the campaign was first announced on 24 February 2010 at the 75th anniversary celebration of the Belarusian national poet Ryhor Baradulin. Niaklajeu said:

We can't live by the laws of lies. We must tell the truth, fight for truth, and the truth will prevail!

On 25 February, Niaklajeu published an appeal to the citizens of Belarus titled, "Let's Tell the Truth Together". This address was supported by historian and human rights activist Tatiana Protko, founder of the Children of Chernobyl Foundation Professor Gennady Grushevoy, Chair of the Belarusian Association of Journalists Zhanna Litvina, academic Radim Garetsky, People's Artist of Belarus Zinaida Bondarenko, international chess grandmaster Viktor Kupreichik, poets Hienadz Buraukin and Rygor Borodulin, and political scientist Alyaksandr Feduta.

A press conference of the campaign organizers was held at the Crowne Plaza hotel in Minsk. Niaklajeu stated:

The goal of the campaign is to awaken Belarusian society, which lives under a cloud of deception and seems oblivious to it.

== History of the campaign ==
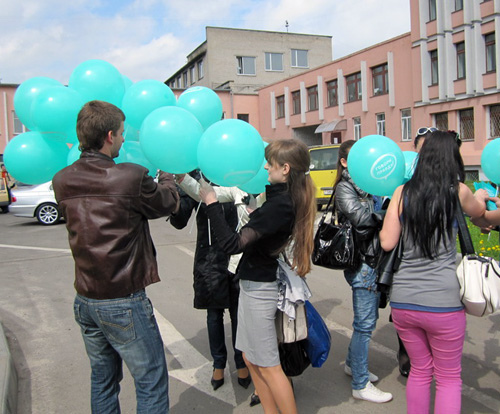
Distribution of symbols in Brest

=== "Tell the Truth!" postcard ===
The first campaign was the mass distribution of postcards bearing the campaign logo, inviting citizens to write about local issues to the Belarusian Presidential Administration. On 19 April Neklaijev made an attempt to deliver several postcards personally, but they refused to accept them in the Presidential Administration because he wasn't an official representative of their authors.

At the same time, Niaklajeu and other campaign activists organized a series of trips around the country, holding meetings with the public to discuss issues of concern. In some cases, raising awareness and public discussion helped resolve local issues or at least lead to their resolution.

=== Monitoring of local elections ===
Before a meeting of the Central Commission for Elections and Referendums in the Republic of Belarus dedicated to the results of local elections in the country, the leadership of Tell the Truth submitted an analytical report to the Commission. In the report Uladzimir Niaklajeu states that "You can call this anything but elections. People were treated scornfully on these elections. People had no choice on these elections. Elections were held according to most oppressive scheme possible".

Sergey Vozniak, a member of the Minsk City Electoral Commission and an author of the monitoring, said:

I believe that the precinct election commissions in these elections did not count the votes as a collective body, and this is the most serious violation.

The report notes, in particular, that 93% of the members submitted by pro-presidential parties were included in the precinct election commissions, compared with only 14% from opposition parties. Authors of monitoring assume that the reason for that lies in the fact that highest degree of falsification takes place in the precinct electoral committees. It also noted unprecedented pressure from the authorities on candidates and activists to force them to withdraw from the elections. It is mentioned in the report that as a result of these actions around 30% of population, which is in opposition with the policies of authorities, is practically not represented in the system of local councils.

=== "I'm for Bykaŭ Street!" campaign ===
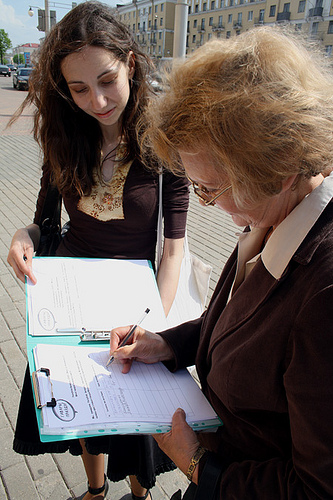
Signature collection for a street named after Vasil Bykaŭ

On the eve of the 65th anniversary of the USSR's victory in the Great Patriotic War, Tell the Truth launched a campaign to commemorate the renowned Belarusian writer and veteran Vasil Bykaŭ. A signature collection was launched to name a newly constructed metro station in Minsk, as well as streets in Minsk and Grodno, after Bykaŭ.

Signature collection in Minsk began on 9 May 2010. One of the proposals was to rename Uljanovskaja Street in Minsk, which is located near Lenin Street (both of these streets are named after Vladimir Lenin, with the former named after his birth surname, Ulyanov) to Bykaŭ Street. Signature collection in Grodno, where Bykaŭ lived for 25 years, began on 11 May. According to the organizers, by 19 June, 65,000 signatures had been collected in Minsk and other cities, and 5,000 signatures in Grodno.

A number of prominent Belarusian figures signed the petition, including writer Hienadz Buraukin, first Prime Minister of Belarus Vyachaslau Kebich, trade unionist Alexander Buhvostov, academician Alexander Vojtovich, and many others.

On 30 June 2010, the Grodno City Commission on Toponymy recommended naming a new street under construction after Bykaŭ. On 12 July, 105,000 signatures were submitted to the Minsk City Executive Committee requesting the renaming of one of the city's streets in Bykaŭ's honor.

On 16 July, campaign activists in Grodno submitted to the City Executive Committee proposals to name a street or square in the city after Bykaŭ and to install a memorial plaque on the house where he lived. These proposals received 7,414 signatures.

On 21 July, at a meeting of the Grodno City Executive Committee, the issue of expanding the existing Bykaŭ Museum was disussed, with a decision reached to allocate an additional room. The street naming issue was not considered.

=== One Hundred Faces of Unemployment ===
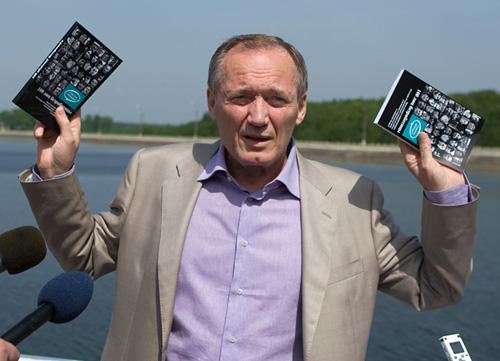
Presentation of the book One Hundred Faces of Unemployment

On 2 June, at the Zaslavl Reservoir near Minsk, campaign leaders presented a book titled One Hundred Faces of Unemployment, dedicated to unemployment in Belarus. The book features the stories of a hundred people who had been unable to find work for a long time. Among them were both prominent figures and ordinary Belarusian citizens. Niaklajeu stated that the founders of Tell the Truth supported the program of Jaroslav Romanchuk, presidential candidate from the United Civic Party, "A Million New Jobs for Belarus".

=== Regional campaigns ===
In addition to nationwide campaigns, campaign activists also initiated a number of local campaigns. For example, in Mogilev, signature collection began o n 2 June for the reconstruction of a local road, and on 10 June, a petition was launched to publish a schedule of local council member receptions in local media. Several campaigns also took place in June in Brest, Horki, Orsha, and other towns.

On 28 June, campaign activists held an environmental campaign, cleaning up trash from Lake Svetilovskoje in the Baranavichy district of Brest region. A similar campaign was held on 10 July in Orsha: with the help of the city executive committee, campaign activists cleaned up the Kuteenka River. On 28 July, a forest park in Grodno was cleared of trash. Several campaigns to clean up trash from the banks of local bodies of water were also held in the Brest region.

=== Beginning of political activity ===
In 2010, several observers have speculated that the campaign was linked to the then-upcoming presidential elections and could serve as a platform for nominating a presidential candidate. Until 2 September, Niaklajeu denied any that he would run for president, and stated that he would not make a decision until the elections were officially announced.

On 19 July on the meeting with Belarusian businessmen Niaklajeu announced that he is planning to become a delegate of 4th All-Belarusian National Assembly, which was supposed to take place in fall 2010. He assumed that it will be enough to collect 20 thousand signatures of citizens. In his interview for newspaper Belarusians and Market Niaklajeu agreed that this step means that the campaign is moving from the field of social activity into political field.

On 27 August, the sub-total of the activity of the campaign was made. On the press conference, the organisers informed the reporters that 80 actions in 33 cities and towns were organised for a period since the campaign was started. As a result, 55 thousand signatures were collected under demands to solve a series of local problems. Uladzimir Niaklajeu declared that the activists managed to attract the attention of citizens of Belarus with their initiatives and social emphasis of the campaign helped people to better understand that it is necessary to solve problems on global level, in the country scale. He stated that many local bureaucrats are sympathizing with the campaign "Tell the Truth!"

On 2 September 2010, Niaklajeu announced his intention to run for president of Belarus in the elections on the Echo of Moscow radio station. On 23 September, he filed an application to register an initiative group to nominate him as a presidential candidate. The group was headed Andrej Dmitriev, one of Niaklajeu's closest associates in Tell the Truth. The initiative group consisted of 3,275 members, and 193,829 signatures were collected in support of Niaklajeu's nomination. According to official data, which Niaklajeu and his supporters dispute as falsified, 1.78% of those who came to the polls voted for Niaklajeu.

== Persecution and controversy ==
- On the 6th in Minsk, 9 thousand of postcards with campaign logo were confiscated from activists of the campaign without any legal reasons. According to the activists, their car was stopped by road police officers who checked their documents and ordered to carry over the postcards from their car in the police car and follow them to Regional Office of Internal Affairs of Central district of Minsk for interrogation.
- On 11 March, Niaklajeu arrived to the office of newspaper Borisov News for a pre-announced press conference, but the announced phone number appeared to be unavailable.
- On 25 April, the police searched a private house in Mozyr looking for drugs during the meeting of city dwellers with Niaklajeu.
- On 1 May in Minsk, 10 activists of the campaign, who were distributing air balloons on the Victory Square, were arrested by the police, sent to Regional Office of Internal Affairs of Central district and later released without official explanation.

=== Mass searches, seizures and arrests on 18 May ===
On 18 May agents of law enforcement agencies came simultaneously to offices of series of social organisations and apartments of activists throughout the country.

Around 1:00 pm reporters started to receive multiple calls from different cities that the police is arresting activists of campaign and attempts to enter apartments for conducting searches. Several men in civilian clothes came to the office of campaign in Minsk and ordered everyone to stay inside. According to different sources of information from 10 to 20 people were arrested only in Minsk. They were transported to Regional Office of Internal Affairs of Lenin district where they were informed that they will be witnessing in criminal case commenced according to part 1 of article 250 of Criminal Code of the Republic of Belarus "Distribution of deliberately misleading information about goods or services". Searches and arrests were also present in Grodno, Gomel, Mogilev, Brest, Bobrujsk, Soligorsk, Slonim, Volkovysk, Borisov, Belynichi and several other towns. In most of the cases all computer equipment, information carriers and printed materials were seized.

Sociological laboratory Novak, headed by professor Andrei Vardomatsky, was also searched. All financial documentation of the organisation was seized. House of Andrej Vardomatskij was also searched.

In Gomel apartment of ex-People's Deputy of the USSR Yuri Voronezhtsev police officers confiscated 3 laptops, one of which belongs to his 3-year daughter, his son's computer, video camera, mobile phones, carriers of information – CD disks, floppy disks, flash memory cards, videotapes and several thousands of US dollars. On 20 May Voronezhtsev was interrogated as a witness of a criminal case. Personal money, saved for medical treatment, confiscated from political scientist Svetlana Naumova.

According to Niaklajeu, everything but nails in the walls was taken away from the Minsk office. As of 29 July the office was still sealed.

Three activists of the campaign – Uladzimir Niaklajeu, main editor of newspaper Comrade, member of Central Bureau of "Fair World" Party Sergey Vozniak, and international coordinator of United Civil Party Andrey Dmitriyeu – were arrested for 3 days and released on 21 May without being charged. They were informed that they were suspects in a criminal case, opened by the Ministry of Internal Affairs.

In total 65 persons from 22 settlements were searched, interrogated and arrested.

=== Version of the Ministry of Internal Affairs ===
As mentioned in the press release of Ministry of Internal Affairs of Belarus dated 21 May the reason for arresting activists and seizures of equipment and documentation was a criminal case, opened according to the request of the owners of publishing company Dixand. They complained about "unauthorized use of brand name, legal address and other information about their firm on printed goods of Dixand. Later the press release says that after investigatory actions it was established that the printed goods were produced by Dixand "by the order of the organizers of movement "Forward" and civil campaign Tell the Truth! Vozniak and Niaklajeu. Ministry of Internal Affairs declares that violations of law by Niaklajeu and Vozniak were "numerous and systematic", but does not specify concrete unlawful actions incriminated to them.

Ministry of Internal Affairs also states that as a result of searches were seized "2 units of firearms, 39 bullets of different caliber, 6 units of cold steel arms and also plant-based narcotic drug". All these items were found in the apartment of campaign activist Valentina Matusevich. Her 25-year-old son who, according to her, had almost no relation to campaign, was arrested and sent to prison.

=== Version of the supporters of Uladzimir Niaklajeu ===
Niaklajeu called the opening of criminal case totally unreasonable and politically motivated. Sergey Vozniak says that 4 weeks before the events he came to one of the printing houses of Minsk to evaluate a possibility of printing the materials of campaign "Tell the Truth!" but had no further business with that printed house. Vozniak also mentioned that the representatives of financial investigation agencies already interrogated him on this matter before the arrest. Like Niaklajeu, he also considers searches and arrests to be politically motivated.

The director of Dixand Alexander Boldyrev informed the Belarusian editor's office of Liberty Radio that he knows nothing about a criminal case related to his company.

Valentina Matusevich, in whose apartment the police found weapons and drugs, explained that her arrested son was several times on duty in the office of the campaign but was barely interested in politics. Uladzimir Niaklajeu also said that he doesn't know Matusevich, who supposedly was his bodyguard. This rumour was also denied by Valentina Matusevich. Niaklajeu also said that he never had bodyguards and construction cartridges found in his apartment during the search the police attempted to register as bullets.

Valentina Matusevich explained to the reporters that "fire arms" found in her apartment are a gas gun and an airgun pistol (Nikita was a professional airgun shooter). The bullets that were found were blank and the collection of knives was collected by Nikita's father 30 years ago. The "plant-based narcotic drug" are herbs that Valentina used for her own treatment.

=== Protests against persecution ===
On 20 May the chairman of European Parliament Jerzy Buzek expressed "great concern about deterioration of situation with human rights in Belarus" related to mass persecution of activists of "Tell the Truth!" campaign. He said that the EU may reconsider its relations with Belarus and demanded to "immediately stop repressions and persecution of civil society organisations and return on the track of democratization" from Belarusian authorities.

Deep concern about repressions against the campaign "Tell the Truth!" was also expressed by the embassy of Great Britain, a presiding country in European Union. A similar concern was expressed by the Chargé d'Affaires of USA in Belarus Mark Boshetti and FIDH.

The head of European Parliament delegation on relations with Belarus Jacek Protasevich declaimed against "politically motivated" searches and noted that the persecution by authorities is caused by the activity of the campaign, which was "aimed at providing true information and monitoring of presidential elections in Belarus".

Representatives of 33 social organizations, including famous scientists and environmentalists of different countries signed a petition to the public prosecution office, Ministry of Internal Affairs and Presidential Admisnistration of Belarus, which expressed protest against persecution of Yuri Voronezhtsev and seizure of personal belongings of the family of a «witness in a case» and demand to restore legal justice. Other organisations and social activists also came out against the persecution.

=== Seizure of signatures ===
As informed by the press-secretary of the campaign Julia Rymashevskaja "most evident hunting" was organized after collected signatures for naming one of the streets and metro stations after Vasil Bykov. Ten thousand signatures were confiscated during the search on 18 May in the office of campaign. On 5 July a car, in which 30 thousand more signatures were kept, was towed and sealed. On 9 July signatures were confiscated by the police during a car search related to the above-mentioned criminal case.

On 7 July the apartment, which was rented to use as an office of the campaign was robbed by the unknown. Nothing was missing accept 50 thousand signatures. Organizers of the campaign said on the press conference that all collected signatures were scanned and are available in electronic format.

=== Arrest of Michail Bashura ===
On the evening of 6 August, agents of KGB arrested an activist of the campaign Michail Bashura and handed him over to officers of Soviet district Regional Office of Internal Affairs of Minsk. At the same day they opened a criminal case according to part 2 of article 380 of Criminal Code (forgery, production, use or sale of fake documents, stamps, formsheets). They claimed that Bashura had overstated his income when he went a guarantee for receiving a credit in a bank in 2008. On 9 August his detention pending trial was extended without charge. On 17 August Bashura was charged with the commission of a crime according to two parts of article 380: forgery of documents aimed to be used by the producer and same actions, conducted by previous concert by a group of people. During investigation, Bashura was kept under arrest. Human rights activists and Uladzimir Niaklajeu consider this case to be politically motivated.

Niaklajeu claims that the authorities changed their tactics and now they are intimidating all activists. At the same day all pickets of the campaign in Mogilev region ware banned, several activists were arrested, one of them – Michail Pashkevich – received a fine of 1,4 million Belarusian rubles.

=== Liquidation of the organization ===
On 3 June the official organizer of the campaign – research and educational institution Movement Forward – received a notification from Minsk City Executive Committee in which they were informed that the Economic Court of Minsk received a claim to withdraw state registration from the company. On 10 June the court took into account the submissions of lawyers of Movement Forward that it is impossible to present organisational documents that were either confiscated by investigation or are located in a sealed office. The court agreed to make his own request for documentation. On 8 July the court refused the Minsk City Executive Committee in liquidation of the organisation.

Later Minsk City Executive Committee made an attempt to litigate the rental agreement. On 20 July the representative of Minsk City Executive Committee stated in Minsk Commercial Court that the placement was rented for office use against the law because it is a trading placement. Deputy of General Director of company Tina Vlati, which owns the placement, presented papers in court, which prove that the placement is administrative. The representative of Movement Forward Nina Pohlopko thinks that the only purpose of the claim was the liquidation of organisation. On 29 July judge Andrej Oleshkevich satisfied the claim and admitted the rental agreement to be unlawful, although he defeated the claim a day before. In his interview to Belsat channel Niaklajeu announced that the campaign will be continued within the framework of a new organisation.

On 12 October the Commercial Court of Minsk satisfied the claim of Minsk City Executive Committee to withdraw state registration of research and educational institution Movement Forward due to the fact, that its organizers presented deliberately misleading information during registration – rental agreement of the office was admitted to be unlawful because the placement was not designed for an office. Representatives of the organization consider this decision to be not fair, not based on law and claimed that they will certainly take advantage of their right of lodging a complaint.

After the presidential elections of December 2010, in which Uladzimir Niaklajeu took part as a candidate, Ministry of Justice refused to register Tell the Truth!

== Opinions about the campaign ==
The chairman of the Francišak Skaryna Belarusian Language Society, Oleg Trusov, was critical about the campaign due to the fact that all its printed materials are distributed in Russian language.

Politician from the opposition Alexander Milinkevich considers the idea of addressing Presidential Administration to be wrong and finds the aims and sources of campaign financing to be questionable.

The chairman of United Civil Party Anatoly Lebedko criticized the idea of Niaklajeu to be nominated as a delegate of All-Belarusian National Assembly. He considers that the collection of signatures will publicize this non-constitutional and scenical structure. Nevertheless, Belarusian political scientists consider the idea of Niaklajeu to be a well-organized PR action.

Member of Writers Union of Belarus Valery Grishkovets accused Uladzimir Niaklajeu that the campaign "Tell the Truth!" is created to nominate Uladzimir Niaklajeu for Peace Nobel Prize. Niaklajeu does not agree with this accusation, considers it to be a fantasy and an attempt to bring his social activity into discredit.

At the end of September 2010, Belarusian TV company broadcast a 20-minute program that said that the campaign "Tell the Truth!" is engaged in money laundering and unlawful diversion of funds, which are provided by foreign funds for democratization of Belarusian society.

Reports about company money expenditures were presented in the program as examples of money laundering. The report had articles like: preparation of a car to motor vehicle inspection, psychologist services, florist services, trips to Vilnius. Over US$1000 was spent on each of them. On the next day, a video message was posted on the Internet page of "Tell the Truth!" in which one of the organizers of campaign "Tell the Truth!" Andrei Dmitrijev denies the accusations and names comments on the facts mentioned in the program to be "a mixture of insanity and sick fantasies". Dmitriev also notes that the program was anonymous and had "neither an author nor a director".

Several independent internet mass media ("Solidarity", "Belarusian Guerilla" and others) mentioned and discussed the assumptions that Niaklajeu's campaign is financed by sponsors from Russia. Russian ambassador in Belarus Alexander Surikov commented on this that the Russian government is not involved in financing Belarusian opposition. An expert of campaign "Tell the Truth!" Alexander Feduta states that the campaign is sponsored by Belarusians who are living in Russia.

Candidate of philosophical sciences, ex-director of informational and analytical center of Academy of Public Administration Under the Aegis of the President of the Republic of Belarus Jurij Baranchik noted the genuine novelty of campaign and well-selected ideological basis. According to Baranchik, this is a "first Belarusian political project after 1994" in the sense that it is not financed by external to Belarus powers, but Belarusians, who live in Russia. He believes that this new type of opposition has big perspectives in Belarus as opposed to nationalists. Effectiveness and creativity of the campaign was also noted by political scientist Valery Karbalevich.

== See also ==
- Censorship in Belarus
- Human rights in Belarus
