= Uladzimir Nyaklyayew =

Belarusian poet and pro-democracy activist

- Уладзімір Някляеў; Владимир Некляев
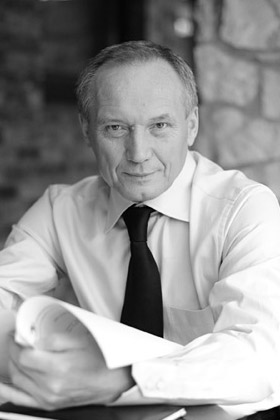
- Nyaklyayew in 2010
- Born: 9 July 1946 (age 80); Smarhon, Byelorussian SSR
- Education: Maxim Tank Belarusian State Pedagogical University, Maxim Gorky Literature Institute

Uladzimir Prakopavich Nyaklyayew (Belarusian: Уладзі́мір Прако́павіч Някля́еў, Łacinka: Uładzimir Prakopavič Niaklajeŭ; Russian: Владимир Прокофьевич Некляев, romanized: Vladimir Prokofyevich Neklyayev; born 11 July 1946) is a Belarusian poet and writer, and a former head of the public campaign Tell the Truth! ("Гавары праўду!"). He was a candidate in the 2010 Belarusian presidential election, and, according to Amnesty International, was placed under house arrest for his role in post-election protests.

== Parents ==
Vladimir Nyaklyayew was born on 11 July 1946 in the city of Smarhon in Grodno Region. His father, Prokofiy Neklyayev, was Russian, and used to work as a mechanic. His mother, Anastasiya Mahyer, was a Belarusian.

== Education ==
Vladimir Nyaklyayew spent his childhood in a small place called Kreva where he finished his first school year. From the 2nd till the 9th school years he was studying at the Smarhon School No. 1. From 1962 till 1966 Nyaklyayew was a student at Higher State Communications College. Having finished the college, he started working in Vladivostok, Taishet, and Norilsk. In 1967 Nyaklyayew returned to Belarus and was working as a radiomechanic at Minsk TV custom shop till 1971.

According to the words of Nyaklyayew, in Far East, Siberia and in the North he managed to see another country and other people. New impressions passed into the first trials of literature works – his poems. In 1969 Vladimir entered the correspondent department of philology at Minsk Pedagogical Institute and graduated from it in 1973. In 1971 he entered the department of poetry at Moscow Literature Institute. In 1972 Nyaklyayew left the Institute and came back to Minsk.

== Journalist career ==
Nyaklyayew used to work as a journalist and editor in a number of Belarusian mass media editions from 1972 till 1999:

- 1972–1975 – literature worker in the newspaper "Znamya Yunosti";
- 1975 – 1987 – editor of bulletin "Theatrical Minsk";
- 1978–1987 – chief editor of the main editorial board of literature and drama programs on Belarusian TV;
- 1987–1998 – chief editor of magazine "Krynitsa";
- 1996–1999 – chief editor of weekly edition "Litaratura i Mastatstva"

== Emigration and return home ==
Beginning from 20 June 1999 Vladimir Nyaklyayew lived in Poland. Having declared in public about his breakup with the official powers, Vladimir Nyaklyayew became the first representative of Belarusian culture who had left Belarus under political reasons. He also used to live in Finland. Within the migration period, he wrote his novel "Musician". Nyaklyayew returned to Minsk in 2003 after the death of Vasil’ Bykaw.

== Literature work ==
His first poems Nyaklyayew started writing in Russian, being the member of literature association in the newspaper "Znamya Yunosti". The incitement to change the profession was the trip to Far East and North, after which, coming back home, he decided to enter the Department of Philology. Having left the Literature Institute once he was back from Moscow in 1972, Nyaklyayew started writing only in Belarusian. Since 1978 he has been the member of the Union of Writers of USSR.

The first big work by Nyaklyayew was his novel "Musician", written in emigration. The novel presentation took place on 21 September 2003, about which he says the following:

I wanted to write about the person who had to undergo everything: glory, money, women… and all of a sudden everything collapsed. And when everything collapsed, he suddenly fell in love. I was interested to find out how he would follow his road with the new feeling. And the fact of the political component in the book is caused by impossibility avoid it.

In 2013 Nyaklyayew received Jerzy Giedroyc Literary Award (an independent yearly award for the best book of prose written in Belarusian) for his novel Soda Fountains With and Without Syrup.

== Works ==
- "Adkryćcio" (Discovery), Minsk 1976
- "Vynachodcy viatroŭ" (Inventors of the Winds), Minsk 1979
- "Znak achovy" (The sign of Protection), Minsk 1983
- "Местное время" (Local Time), Moscow 1983
- "Naskroź" (Throughout), Minsk 1985
- "Hałubinaja pošta" (Pigeon Mail), Minsk 1987
- "Дерево боли" (The Tree of Pain), Moscow 1989
- "Prošča" (Proshcha), Minsk 1996
- "Vybranaje" (Selected works), Minsk 1998
- "Łabuch" (Musician), St. Petersburg 2003
- "Tak" (Yes), Minsk 2004
- "Centar Eŭropy" (The Center of Europe), Minsk 2009 (prose works)
- "Kon" (Con), Minsk 2010

In 2008 in the section "The Voice of Poet" there was edited an audio book with Niaklajeŭ’s poems read by the author.

In 2009 in the section "Belarusian books overview" one book of Niaklajeŭ’s poems and prose works was edited with the preface written by Ryhor Baradulin.

== Comments ==
Philosopher and cultural scientist Valancin Akudovič thinks that "Niaklajeŭ broke the stereotype that the best poems can be written by the poet in his young years because the emotions are stronger when we are young. Akudovic believes that the poem "Łožak dla pčały" A Bed for a Bee written by Uładzimier Niaklajeŭ in his mature age is the best work he had ever written, and one of the best in the entire Belarusian literature. If not the best one ever."

… to discover the creative works by V. Nyaklyayew is the work that requires inspiration, soaring in the thoughts and feelings into the sky. Being inspirable and a hard worker, Niaklajeŭ’s achievements are obvious. In general, to describe what Uładzimier Niaklajeŭ is in creative works and life requires the talent equal to his. Neklyayew should be discovered like America. Colombo is still growing up … – Ryhor Baradulin, People's Writer of Belarus

It is nothing to tell that I was happy to work with Niaklajeŭ. Cooperating with any poet, apart from a co-author, I found a friend. In this case, regardless the age difference of 25 years, we could understand each other very well … – Źmicier Vajciuškievič, a bard.

== Social activity ==
Uładzimier Niaklajeŭ was a member of the Union of Creative and Scientific Youth under the Central Committee of Belarus Komsomol and a member of Belarusian Theatrical Association.

In 1998–2001 Niaklajeŭ chairman of the Union of Belarusian Writers (preceded by Vasil Zujonak, succeeded by Volha Ipatava. In May 2010, Niaklajeŭ became the member of the Union Council.

According to Niaklajeŭ’s words, after having been appointed to the position of the chairman of the Association of Writers, he had to deal with the president of Belarus Alaksandar Łukašenka who treated Niaklajeŭ as "the boss over the writers". At the same time an agreement creating Belarus and Russia Union State was signed, which was not approved by the writers of Belarus, protesting against this decision in public. It was the beginning of the conflict between Łukašenka and Niaklajeŭ and as a result, Uładzimier Niaklajeŭ had to leave the country.

At the 13th special congress of the Union of Belarusian Writers, Niaklajeŭ suggested that there should be accepted the resolution to support the oppositional candidate, saying that Łukašenka was in power illegally and had no right to be the candidate for presidency.

In 2005, V. Niaklajeŭ was elected as the head of Belarusian PEN Center, and on 10 April, he voluntarily left that position. Andrej Chadanvič became the next head of the Center.

Since 25 February 2010, he was the initiator of the civil campaign "Tell the Truth!". Neklyayew thinks that finally in the society there appeared the demand for the true information of the current situation in the country, taking into consideration that the powers are lying, hide the real situation or distort the information.

On 18 May 2010 Niaklajeŭ and two other activists were arrested and kept by the law enforcement agencies of Belarus; about 20 activists of the campaign underwent repressions. Niaklajeŭ was released on 21 May 2010.

On 18 November 2010 Niaklajeŭ had been officially registered as a candidate for presidency to run in the 2010 Belarusian presidential election.

On the day of the presidential elections on 19 December 2010 Niaklajeŭ was seriously beaten by unidentified men in black when he was on his way to an opposition protest rally in Minsk, sustained a head injury during this beating and was abducted from intensive care by the Belarusian authorities. On 28 January 2011, Niaklajeŭ was transferred from prison to house arrest whilst still a political prisoner without appropriate medical treatment. Amnesty International has named him a prisoner of conscience and called for his immediate and unconditional release.

== Awards, orders, prizes ==
- The Prize of Lenin Komsomol for the book "The inventors of the Winds" – in 1979.
- Order of the Badge of Honour – for the contribution into the literature – in 1986.
- State award of RB named after Janka Kupala (in the sphere of literature) – in 1998, for the book of poems and "Proshcha", published in 1996.
- Laureate of the first prize in the 1st International Festival of Slavic Poetry "Singing Letters" (Tver, Russia) in 2009.
- Jerzy Giedroyc Literary Award in 2013.

== Family and personal views ==
Married for the first time in the age of 19. His wife Ludmila was 5 years older than Uładzimier and had a child. Neklyayew and Ludmila stayed together for 35 years. Apart from Ludmiła's daughter Iłona they have a common daughter Eva.

The second wife of Uładzimier Volha used to work in the technical department of the magazine "Krynica" at the time, when Niaklajeŭ was the chief editor. Volha is 20 years younger than Niaklajeŭ.
