= Katsyaryna Andreeva =

Belarusian journalist (born 1993)

- Кацярына Андрэева
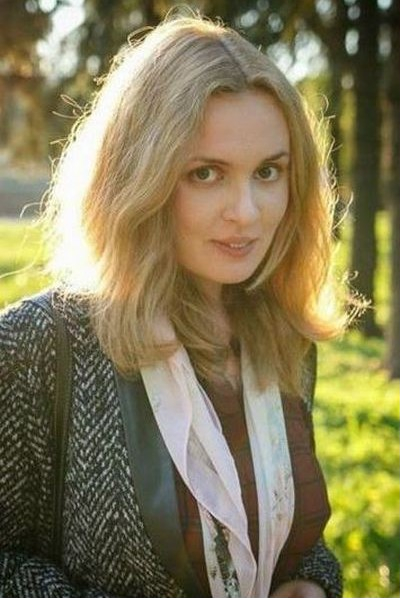
- Born: November 2, 1993 (age 33); Minsk, Belarus
- Occupation: Journalist
- Spouse: Ihar Ilyash
- Awards: Medal of the Order of the Pahonia

Katsyaryna Andreeva (Belarusian: Кацярына Андрэева; Russian: Катерина Андреева; real name: Katsyaryna Andreevna Bakhvalava; Belarusian: Кацярына Андрэеўна Бахвалава; born November 2, 1993) is a Belarusian journalist. She worked for the television network Belsat TV.

At Minsk's Square of Changes, she broadcast Raman Bandarenka being beaten to death on November 15, 2020. She was arrested on site and sentenced to two years in prison. In 2022, she was further sentenced to an additional eight years in prison on charges of "state treason", which Amnesty International called "bogus." She was pardoned and de facto exiled to Lithuania in March 2026 as part of a deal between Belarus and the United States to ease sanctions.

== Early life and career ==
Andreeva was born in Minsk to a family of journalists. She studied for about two and a half years in Minsk State Linguistic University before moving to Spain where she taught English for two years. Then she came back home and worked for the newspaper Nasha Niva as a journalist. In 2017, she began working for Belsat TV.

Andreeva and Ihar Ilyash wrote the book Belarusian Donbas in 2020. The book is about how the Belarusian people and organizations take part in the war in Donbas on the side of Russian separatist forces. The Belarusian regime deemed it to be extremist and banned the book and its content countrywide via court decision in 2021.

Andreeva was first arrested in 2017 in Orsha. On September 12, 2020, she was arrested by OMON for a live broadcast of a women's march in Minsk and was imprisoned for three days.

=== Criminal procedure ===
Alongside fellow journalist Darya Chultsova, she was a suspect in a criminal case on organizing actions that attack public order. On November 15, 2020, in Minsk, they both broadcast a raid conducted by the Militsiya and its affiliates at the Square of Changes—the place where Raman Bandarenka was beaten to death. She was arrested at the square and was moved to a prison in Zhodzina, where she was held until her court trial. On November 24, 2020, ten organizations, including the Viasna Human Rights Centre, the Belarusian Association of Journalists, the Belarusian Helsinki Committee, made a joint statement and recognized her as a political prisoner.

At a Minsk court hearing led by judge Natalia Buguk on February 18, 2021, Andreeva and Chultsova were sentenced to two years in prison for pushing 2020 Belarusian protests. The public prosecutor was Alina Kasyanchyk, and the investigator was Ihar Kurylovich. On April 23, 2021, Minsk City Court declined an appeal on the sentence.

In 2022, Andreeva was sentenced to additional eight years in prison on charges of "state treason," which Amnesty International called "bogus."

== Reaction ==
On February 8, 2021, the US Embassy in Belarus made a statement, asking to make Chultsova and Andreeva free.

On February 4, 2021, godparenthood for the political prisoner was undertaken by Delara Burkhardt, a Member of the European Parliament. Following the sentencing, on February 18, 2021, the President of Poland Andrzej Duda made a public call for amnesty for Chultsova and Andreeva.

In accordance with the decision of the Council of the European Union on June 21, 2021, judge Natalia Buguk was included in the list of people and organizations sanctioned in relation to human rights violations in Belarus for, among other things, “numerous politically motivated rulings against journalists and protesters, in particular the sentencing of Katsyaryna Bakhvalava (Andreyeva) and Darya Chultsova” and violations of rights of defence and to a fair trial. By the same decision, the Assistant Prosecutor at the Frunzyenski District Court of Minsk Alina Kasyanchyk was included in the sanctions list. She was held responsible, among other things, for prosecuting journalists for “recording peaceful protests, based on the groundless charges of ‛conspiracy’ and ‛violating public order.’” Senior investigator of the Frunzyenski District Department of the Investigative Committee Ihar Kurylovich was put on the list too for, among other things, preparing a politically motivated criminal case against the journalists who recorded peaceful protests.

== Awards ==
On December 10, 2020, she was named Journalist of the Year (2020).

On March 10, 2021, she got the Award named after Dariusz Fikus by the Press Club Polska.

Together with Darya Chultsova and Katsiaryna Barysevich, on April 9, 2021, she got the Ales Lipay (the founder of BelaPAN) Award "Honor of Journalism."

Together with Darya Chultsova on June 7, 2021, she got the Axel-Springer-Preis.

Together with Darya Chultsova on June 10, 2021, she got the Courage in Journalism Award, a prize by the International Women's Media Foundation.

Together with Darya Chultsova on July 29, 2021, she was named the winner of the Preis für die Freiheit und Zukunft der Medien (a German award in the field of freedom of the press).

Together with Darya Chultsova, Katsiaryna Barysevich, and others, on August 12, 2021, she got the Free Media Award.

Together with Darya Chultsova on October 15, 2021, she got the Prix Europa in the category of the "European Journalist of 2021."

In March 2023, she was awarded the Medal of the Order of the Pahonia.

== Appraisal ==
"[They are] strong in spirit, have no doubt in the right [of them], supported by friends, colleagues and the people that they do not know at all – such Katya and Dasha will be put in textbooks," wrote Aksana Kolb, editor-in-chief of Novy Chas, on the eve of their sentencing.

== Personal life ==
She married journalist Ihar Ilyash in 2016.

== Books ==
- "Belarusian Donbas" (together with Ihar Ilyash) (2020)
