= Death of Raman Bandarenka =

Belarusian pro-democracy activist

Raman Bandarenka
- Born: August 1, 1989
- Died: November 12, 2020; Minsk, Belarus
- Occupations: Artist, store manager
- Known for: Activism during the 2020 Belarusian protests
- Awards: Medal of the Order of the Pahonia; Honar i Hodnaść

Raman Iharavich Bandarenka (Belarusian: Раман Ігаравіч Бандарэнка; August 1, 1989 – November 12, 2020) was an aspiring Belarusian artist and store manager. His death is associated with the protests against the 2020 Belarusian presidential election. Raman Bandarenka died after reportedly being beaten by security forces. Police forces said they found him unconscious and called an ambulance.

According to sources, masked assailants in civilian clothing beat him up, in the yard of his apartment building, in the evening of November 11, 2020 in Minsk. Locally, this apartment complex is known as "Square of Changes" (Ploshcha Peramen). Later, a minibus took him away. An ambulance brigade brought him from the Central District Department of Internal Affairs (Police Station) to a local hospital. At the time the ambulance took him, he was unconscious. At the hospital, he was diagnosed with different injuries to the head and brain, bruises, and abrasions. Banderenka went into surgery in an attempt to save his life and fell into a coma. He never recovered and died on November 12, 2020, in the hospital in Minsk.

The United Nations High Commissioner for Human Rights spoke about his death. In March 2023, he was posthumously awarded the Medal of the Order of the Pahonia.

== Biography ==
Raman Bandarenka born on August 1, 1989, in Minsk. After school, he entered the Minsk State College of Architecture and Construction, and then the Belarusian State Academy of Arts, graduating from the Faculty of Design in 2012.

In 2014, he was conscripted into the 3rd Separate Special-Purpose Brigade of the Internal Troops of the Ministry of Internal Affairs of Belarus (military unit 3214), and subsequently stayed in contact with his colleagues. Later, he worked as an administrator and then director of one of the retail stores of the "Ostrov Chistoty" in Minsk.

== Circumstances of his death ==
During the protests, the yard next to the house in which Raman lived became widely known as the "Square of Changes (Rus: PloschaPeramen)". This name arose after residents of the residential complex in the quarter between Chervyakova, Kakhovskaya and Smorgovsky tract streets painted a mural with "DJs of Change," two DJs who played the Russian pop song called "Khochu peremen" at an event and were subsequently arrested, on one of the walls of a transformer booth. This mural was repeatedly destroyed, but then restored again by the local residents. The yard was often covered with red and white ribbons, symbolising the flag of the Belarusian Democratic Republic, which has become a symbol for the freedom movement in Belarus.

On November 11, 2020, at about 22:00, six men and 3 women in civilian clothes and in masks arrived at the "Square of Changes" and began to cut off the red and white ribbons placed by local residents. Raman Bandarenka found out about this in a local text chat in the popular app Telegram. He posted his final message in the group, "I'm going out!" before going out to the street to see what was happening.

Outside, he stood watching what was happening. According to reports, he may have made a remark to which one of the masked people replied to him harshly before pushing Raman to the ground. At this time, Raman hit his head on a children's slide as he fell. The masked assailants proceeded to pin Raman to the ground and command him to "Lie down!" The main initiator of the fight left, and three others continued to beat him.

Following the assault, Raman was dragged off to a silver minibus. This is the last known time he was seen conscious. The events of this evening were filmed by eyewitnesses from different angles and then posted on the net.

He was taken to the Central District Department of Internal Affairs (Police Station), from which he was admitted to the Emergency Department of the Minsk City Clinical Emergency Hospital on November 12 at 0:05. He was diagnosed with multiple injuries. He underwent an operation in an attempt to save his life. Raman Bandarenka died on November 12, 2020.

As of January, 14, 2021, no criminal case was opened on his killing.

== Suspects and independent investigation ==
On November 16, 2020, the Ministry of Foreign Affairs of Latvia imposed a travel ban against the kickboxer Dmitry Shakuta and the president of the Belarusian hockey federation Dzmitry Baskau ‘for an unspecified period’ because of their alleged involvement in the killing of Raman Bandarenka. A number of sportspeople have previously identified them in photos and videos of the masked persons who attacked Bandarenka. Baskau and Shakuta did not comment on the suspicions. In the same month Estonia also imposed a travel ban against Shakuta and Baskau. In January 2021 the International Ice Hockey Federation declared that it opened an independent investigation concerning the involvement of Dzmitry Baskau in this incident.

== Reactions to his death ==
=== Public reaction ===
On the evening of November 12, several thousand Belarusians came to the “Square of Change” to pay tribute to Raman Bandarenka. The next day, in various districts of Minsk, other cities and villages of Belarus, people came out to express their sympathy.

On November 15, 2020, at 12:00 in Minsk and other cities of the country the protest march "I'm going out!" in memory of Raman Bandarenka and all the victims of the protests took place. The Minsk event was ended by the cruel attack of the Militsiya on the people stood at the “Square of Change” to support the dead one. Katsyaryna Andreeva and Darya Chultsova of Belsat TV showed the event live. They were arrested at the “Square of Change” that day. On November 24 ten organizations (the Viasna Human Rights Centre, the Belarusian Association of Journalists, the Belarusian Helsinki Committee and others) made a joint statement. It said that they are political prisoners. On February 18, 2021, the journalists were sentenced to serve two years in prison for pushing 2020 Belarusian protests.

The funeral of Raman Bandarenka took place on November 20, 2020, after the body was released to the family after an extended wait. The family invited everyone to the ceremony, which was attended by several thousands. Many chanted popular slogans, such as "Long live Belarus!", "We will not forget, we will not forgive!”, “Roma, you are a hero”, and “I'm going out” – Raman's final words.

=== Reaction of Alexander Lukashenko ===
On November 13, during a meeting with Belarusian and international journalists, Alexander Lukashenko expressed his condolences to the parents of Raman Bandarenka. At the conference, he said that he instructed the chairman of the Investigative Committee to investigate the incident and instructed the Prosecutor General to take it under "the most serious control." Lukashenko told reporters: "But in this case, as I was told, a fight broke out, moreover, a serious fight. And someone from the protesters called the "police." A reinforced police squad was sent. When they arrived, as usual, everyone fled. And this one was either injured or something ... inebriated. This is a fact. The conclusion was presented today by the Investigative Committee. They posted it all. He was drunk. Of course, he was taken and taken by this department. He felt ill on the way, as I was told. They called an ambulance and sent him to the hospital."

=== Other reactions ===
Chairman of the Council of the Republic Natalya Kochanova stated: "Now there is a radicalization [of the protests]. ...This is the case with this Bondarenko. He himself went out [into the yard]. The fact that he was drunk is one hundred percent fact. Now there is an investigation, and have already established that false information was put on the Internet, that he was sober (we are talking about information and documents from the doctors of the emergency room). But the investigation will go further. But did you see how he [Bondarenko] was honored? A memorial! And how many drunks [in the whole country] are fighting? Every day they die. And they [the protesters] are arranging memorial services. The President said it right: we need to clean up the city!"

As of November 27, 2020, no criminal case has been instituted on Bandarenka's death, while TUT.BY journalist Katsiaryna Barysevich and doctor Artsyom Sorokin, who reported medical information that the murdered man was completely sober, refuting the words of Alexander Lukashenko and Natalya Kochanova that Bandarenka was drunk, had been detained in connection with the criminal case upon them. On November 24, the human rights organization Amnesty International named them prisoners of conscience in the Bandarenka matter. On the same day, ten organizations (the Viasna Human Rights Centre, the Belarusian Association of Journalists, the Belarusian Helsinki Committee and others) made a joint statement. It said that Katsyaryna Barysevich is a political prisoner. Boris Haretski, deputy chairman of the Belarusian Association of Journalists, said that the authorities were not fighting the problem, but the media, “They think that if the press does not write about Bandarenka, people will not find out about it. Of course, they will know everything, but the media is still under attack." On March 2, 2021, Barysevich was sentenced to serve a half-year in prison and to pay a fine for damages in 100 units of base amount for writing on the late Raman Bandarenka, doctor Artsyom Sorokin got two years in prison and a fine in 50 units of base amount.

The chairman of the Viasna Human Rights Centre Ales Bialiatski accused the Ministry of Internal Affairs (Belarus) of the death of Raman Bandarenka.

In a statement dated 13 November 2020, the EU condemned the brutality. The diplomatic missions of Great Britain, Germany, and the EU in Belarus honored the victim with a minute of silence. Many foreign media outlets wrote or released stories about the death of Raman Bandarenka (Belsat, U.S. News & World Report, Meduza, RIA Novosti, BBC, Current Time TV, Associated Press, Libération, TVP Info, Washington Post, bne IntelliNews, ČT24, and others).

On November 19, 2020, Jim Gilmore, U.S. Representative to United States Mission to the Organization for Security and Cooperation in Europe, spoke on the killing of Bandarenka that became a sign of “the impunity of Belarusian security forces.”

On November 26, 2020, European Parliament discussed the situation in Belarus. The discussion resulted in the adoption of a resolution "on the continuation of human rights violations in Belarus, in particular the murder of Raman Bandarenka", supported by an absolute majority of deputies, calling for a "prompt, thorough, impartial and independent investigation into the death."

On August 9, 2021, Dmitry Shakuta was put in the Specially Designated Nationals and Blocked Persons List of the USA. He got a punishment for "violent attack on Bandarenka" and his transfer to the police.
