= Katsiaryna Barysevich =

Belarusian journalist (born 1984)

Katsyaryna Barysevich
- Кацярына Анатольеўна Барысевіч
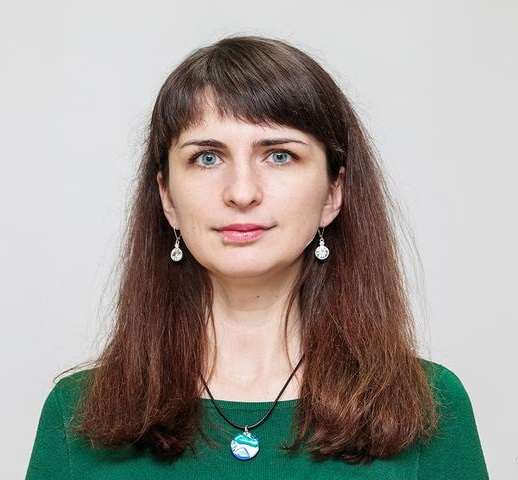
- Borisevich in 2021
- Born: August 2, 1984 (age 42)
- Citizenship: Belarus
- Education: Belarusian State University
- Occupation: journalist

Katsiaryna Anatolewna Barysevich (Belarusian: Кацярына Анатольеўна Барысевіч; born 2 August 1984) is a Belarusian journalist. She is a staff correspondent for the independent news site Tut.By. She has worked for European Radio for Belarus and other media. She reported on the death of Raman Bandarenka in 2020. She was arrested on November 19, 2020, in Minsk.

== Detention ==
On November 24, 2020, the human rights organization Amnesty International named her a prisoner of conscience in the Bandarenka case. On the same day, ten organizations (the Viasna Human Rights Centre, the Belarusian Association of Journalists, the Belarusian Helsinki Committee and others) made a joint statement and classified her as a political prisoner. Boris Haretski, deputy chairman of the Belarusian Association of Journalists, said that the authorities were not fighting the problem, but the media, “They think that if the press does not write about Bandarenka, people will not find out about it. Of course, they will know everything, but the media is still under attack."

On December 10, 2020, she was named Journalist of the Year (2020).

On December 16, 2020, patronage over the political prisoner was undertaken by Cem Özdemir, an MP of the Bundestag.

On March 2, 2021, Barysevich was sentenced to a half-year in prison and a fine in 100 basic units for reporting personal data on the death of Raman Bandarenka during the 2020–2021 Belarusian protests against Belarusian President Alexander Lukashenko.

Among others, Barysevich's imprisonment and sentencing were condemned by the European Federation of Journalists, the Committee to Protect Journalists, and the International Press Institute.

Together with Darya Chultsova and Katsyaryna Andreeva, on April 9, 2021, she was awarded the Prize "Honour of Journalism" named after BelaPAN's founder Aleś Lipaj.

On July 14, 2021, she got the CPJ International Press Freedom Award, alongside Anastasia Mejía, Matías Guente and Aye Chan Naing. On August 12, 2021, she got the Free Media Award.
