= Belarus Olympic Committee =

National Olympic Committee

- Country: Belarus
- Code: BLR
- Created: 1991
- Recognized: 1993
- Continental Association: EOC
- Headquarters: Minsk, Belarus
- President: Viktor Lukashenko
- Secretary General: George Katulin
- Website: www.noc.by

The National Olympic Committee of the Republic of Belarus (Belarusian: Нацыянальны алімпійскі камітэт Рэспублікі Беларусь, Russian: Национальный олимпийский комитет Республики Беларусь; IOC Code: BLR) is one of many national Olympic committees that make up the International Olympic Committee (IOC). Created in 1991, the NOC RB, was charged with selecting athletes to represent Belarus in the Summer and Winter Olympic Games, enforcing anti-doping laws and promoting sporting activity inside Belarus. The current president of the NOC RB is Victor Lukashenko, the son of the current President of Belarus, Alexander Lukashenko.

== History ==
The NOC RB was established on March 22, 1991, several months before the dissolution of the USSR. Until that event, Byelorussian SSR's Olympic activity was controlled by the Soviet Olympic Committee, which did not disband until 1992. During that same year, Belarus competed in the 1992 Summer and Winter Olympics as part of the Unified Team made of former Soviet republics (except the Baltic states). Granted temporary membership in 1992, the NOC RB was not granted full membership until the 101st International Olympic Committee Session in the year 1993. Also in 1993, Vladimir Ryzhenkov, who was at the time the Belarus Minister for Sport and Tourism, was elected to the post of President of the NOC RB. Ryzhenkov held the position until his death in 1996, and was replaced in 1997 with Belarusian President Alexander Lukashenko. In Lukashenko's first speech as NOC RB president, he stated there were no other examples of a head of state serving as a NOC Chairman or President at the same time. From 2005 to 2015, George Katulin served as a secretary general of NOC RB.

In December 2020, the International Olympic Committee sanctioned members of the NOC RB, including Alexander Lukashenko, Viktor Lukashenko and Dzmitry Baskau, for political discrimination against Belarusian athletes.

On August 9, 2021, the Belarus Olympic Committee was added to the Specially Designated Nationals and Blocked Persons List by the United States Department of the Treasury.

In addition, the presidents of the NOC Alexander and Viktor Lukashenko are under the sanctions of the United States, the European Union, the United Kingdom, Switzerland and Canada, while Dzmitry Baskau, a member of the executive board, is banned from entering Lithuania, Latvia and Estonia.

On February 26, 2022, in response to the Belarus-assisted Russian invasion of Ukraine and NOC RB's treatment of Belarusian athletes, the IOC temporarily suspended Belarusian athletes and officials from entering international events. It was lifted in 2026.

== Executive Board ==
Designation	Name
President	Viktor Lukashenko
Vice-President	Dmitri Dovgalenok
Secretary General	Polina Golovina
Member	Dzmitry Baskau
Member	Andrey Barbashinsky
Member	Aliaksandr Bahdanovich
Member	Aleksandr But-Gusaim
Member	Olena Zubrilova
Member	Liubov Charkashyna
Member	Irina Malevanaya
Member	Denis Muzhzhukhin
Member	Natallia Tsylinskaya

== Member federations ==
The Belarusian National Federations are the organizations that coordinate all aspects of their individual sports. They are responsible for training, competition and development of their sports. There are currently 36 Olympic Summer and 8 Winter Sport Federations in Belarus.

National Federation	Summer or Winter	Headquarters
Belarusian Alpine Skiing and Snowboard Federation	Winter	Minsk
Belarusian Archery Federation	Summer	Minsk
Belarus Athletic Federation	Summer	Minsk
Belarusian Badminton Federation	Summer	Minsk
Belarus Baseball Association	Summer	Minsk
Belarusian Basketball Federation	Summer	Minsk
Belarusian Biathlon Federation	Winter	Minsk
Belarusian Boxing Federation	Summer	Minsk
Belarusian Canoe Association	Summer	Minsk
Belarusian Curling Association	Winter	Minsk
Belarusian Cycling Federation	Summer	Minsk
Belarusian Diving Federation	Summer	Minsk
Belarusian Equestrian Federation	Summer	Minsk
Belarusian Fencing Federation	Summer	Minsk
Belarusian Field Hockey Federation	Summer	Minsk
Football Federation of Belarus	Summer	Minsk
Belarusian Freestyle Skiing Federation	Winter	Minsk
Belarusian Golf Association	Summer	Minsk
Belarusian Gymnastics Association	Summer	Minsk
Belarusian Handball Federation	Summer	Minsk
Belarusian Ice Hockey Association	Winter	Minsk
Belarusian Judo Federation	Summer	Minsk
Belarusian Karate Federation	Summer	Minsk
Belarusian Modern Pentathlon Federation	Summer	Minsk
Belarusian Mountaineering Federation	Summer	Minsk
Belarusian Rowing Federation	Summer	Minsk
Belarusian Rugby Federation	Summer	Minsk
Belarus Sailing Union	Summer	Minsk
Belarusian Shooting Federation	Summer	Minsk
Belarusian Skateboarding Federation	Summer	Minsk
Belarusian Skeet Federation	Summer	Minsk
Belarusian Ski Union	Winter	Minsk
Belarusian Skiing Federation	Winter	Minsk
Belarusian Speed Skating Union	Winter	Minsk
Belarusian Swimming Federation	Summer	Minsk
Belarusian Synchronized Swimming Federation	Summer	Minsk
Belarusian Table Tennis Federation	Summer	Minsk
Belarusian Taekwondo Federation	Summer	Minsk
Belarusian Tennis Federation	Summer	Minsk
Belarusian Triathlon Federation	Summer	Minsk
Belarusian Volleyball Federation	Summer	Minsk
Belarusian Water Polo Federation	Summer	Minsk
Belarusian Weightlifting Union	Summer	Minsk
Belarusian Wrestling Federation	Summer	Minsk

== See also ==
- Belarus at the Olympics
