= Darya Chultsova =

Belarusian journalist

- Дар’я Дзмітрыеўна Чульцова
- Born: 20 February 1997 (age 29)
- Citizenship: Belarus
- Education: Mogilev State A. Kuleshov University
- Occupation: Journalist
- Awards: Medal of the Order of the Pahonia

Darya Chultsova (Belarusian: Дар’я Дзмітрыеўна Чульцова, Russian: Дарья Дмитриевна Чульцова) (born on 20 February 1997, in Shklow, Mogilev Region, Belarus) is a Belarusian journalist. She worked for the television channel Belsat TV. She broadcast the event from the Square of Changes in Minsk where Raman Bandarenka was beaten to death in 2020. She was arrested on site on 15 November 2020.

== Early life and career ==
She was born in Shklow. Being a little girl, she became interested in journalism. During the university years, she worked part-time for the website "Mogilev.Online". She graduated the Department of Journalism of Mogilev State A. Kuleshov University in 2020. In 2020, she moved to the TV channel Belsat TV and worked there as a journalist.

=== Criminal procedure ===
Together with journalist Katsyaryna Andreeva, she became a suspect in a criminal case on organizing actions that attack public order. On 15 November 2020, in Minsk, both broadcast the event of a cruel raid of the Militsiya and its affiliates at the Square of Changes, the place where Raman Bandarenka was beaten to death and the people peacefully stood to support the dead one there.

She did not become free after the arrest at the square. Chultsova was moved to a prison in Zhodzina, where she was held until court trial. On 24 November 2020, ten organizations, including the Viasna Human Rights Centre, the Belarusian Association of Journalists, the Belarusian Helsinki Committee, made a joint statement and recognized her as a political prisoner.

At a Minsk court hearing led by the judge Natalia Buguk on 18 February 2021, Andreeva and Chultsova were sentenced to serve two years in prison for pushing 2020 Belarusian protests. The public prosecutor was Alina Kasyanchyk, the investigator was Ihar Kurylovich.

On 23 April 2021 Minsk City Court declined an appeal on the sentence.

== Reaction ==
On 8 February 2021 the US Embassy in Belarus made a statement, asking to make Chultsova and Andreeva free.

On 15 February 2021 godparenthood for the political prisoner was undertaken by Tony Lloyd, a member of the House of Commons of the United Kingdom.

Following the sentencing, on 18 February 2021, President of Poland Andrzej Duda made a public call for amnesty for Chultsova and Andreeva.

In accordance with the decision of the Council of the European Union on 21 June 2021, judge Natalia Buguk was included in the list of people and organizations sanctioned in relation to human rights violations in Belarus for, among other things, “numerous politically motivated rulings against journalists and protesters, in particular the sentencing of Katsyaryna Bakhvalava (Andreyeva) and Darya Chultsova” and violations of rights of defence and to a fair trial. By the same decision, the Assistant Prosecutor at the Frunzyenski District Court of Minsk Alina Kasyanchyk was included in the sanctions list. She was held responsible, among other things, for prosecuting journalists for “recording peaceful protests, based on the groundless charges of ‛conspiracy’ and ‛violating public order.’” Senior investigator of the Frunzyenski District Department of the Investigative Committee Ihar Kurylovich was put on the list too for, among other things, preparing a politically motivated criminal case against the journalists who recorded peaceful protests.

== Awards ==
- On 10 December 2020 she was named Journalist of the Year (2020).
- On 10 March 2021 she received the Award named after Dariusz Fikus by the Press Club Polska.
- Along with Katsyaryna Andreeva and Katsiaryna Barysevich, on 9 April 2021, she received the Ales Lipay (the founder of BelaPAN) Award "Honor of Journalism."
- Along with Katsyaryna Andreeva on 7 June 2021, she received the Axel-Springer-Preis.
- Along with Katsyaryna Andreeva on 10 June 2021, she received the Courage in Journalism Award, a prize by the International Women's Media Foundation.
- Along with Katsyaryna Andreeva on 29 July 2021, she was named the winner of the Preis für die Freiheit und Zukunft der Medien (a German award in the field of freedom of the press).
- Along with Katsyaryna Andreeva, Katsiaryna Barysevich, and others, on 12 August 2021, she received the Free Media Award.
- Along with Katsyaryna Andreeva on 15 October 2021, she received the Prix Europa in the category of the "European Journalist of 2021."
- In March 2023, she was awarded the Medal of the Order of the Pahonia.

== Appraisal ==
"[They are] strong in spirit, have no doubt in the right [of them], supported by friends, colleagues and the people that they do not know at all – such Katya and Dasha will be put in textbooks," Aksana Kolb, editor-in-chief of Novy Chas, wrote on the eve of their sentencing.
