= Statue of Maria Skłodowska-Curie (Lublin) =

Bronze statue in Poland

Maria Skłodowska-Curie Monument
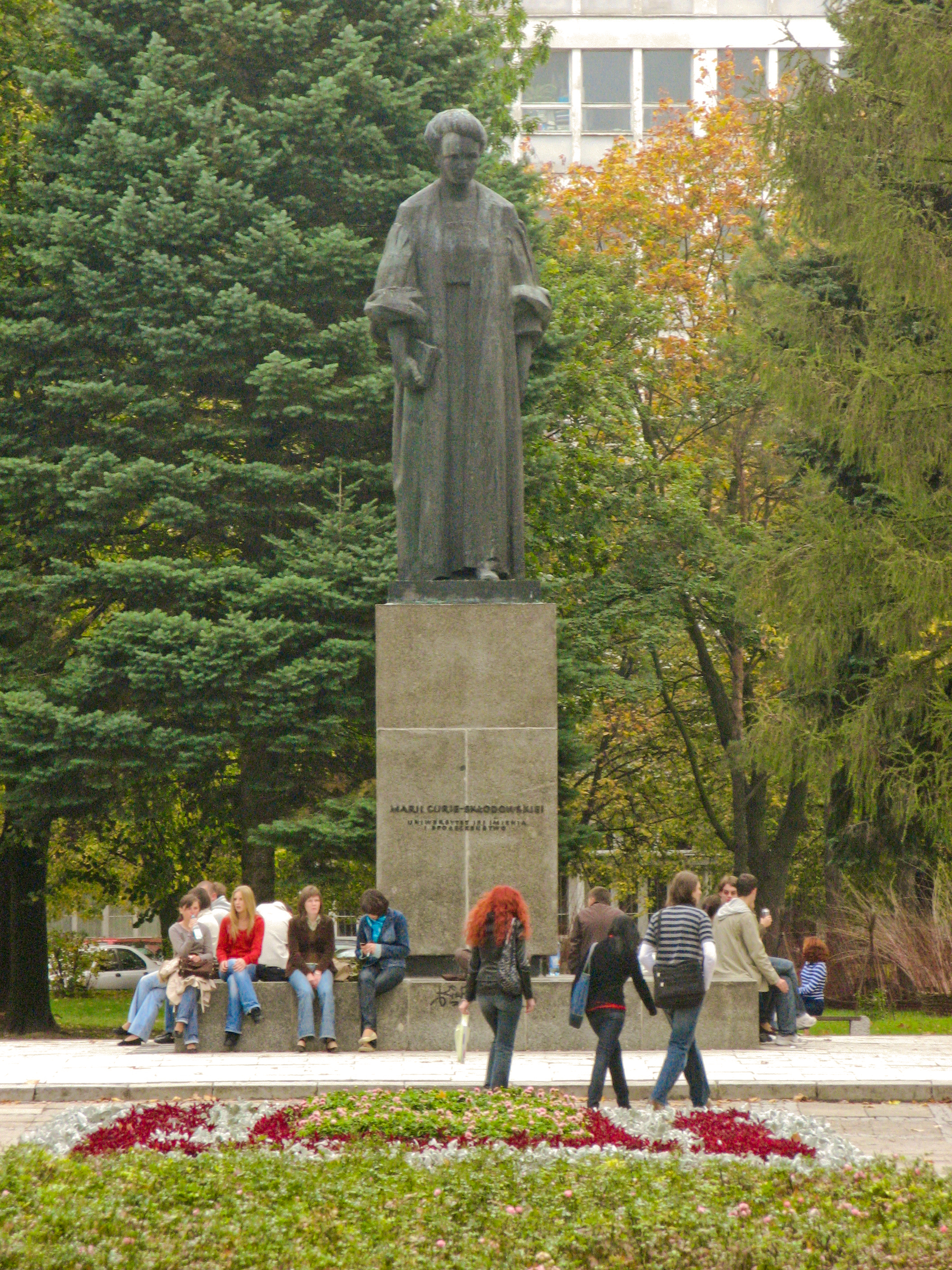
- Interactive map of Maria Skłodowska-Curie Monument
- Location: Lublin, Poland
- Coordinates: 51°14′44″N 22°32′30″E
- Designer: Marian Konieczny
- Material: bronze
- Height: 4 m (13 ft)
- Opening date: 24 October 1964
- Dedicated to: Marie Curie

The Maria Skłodowska-Curie Monument (Polish: Pomnik Marii Skłodowskiej-Curie w Lublinie) is a bronze statue in Lublin, eastern Poland, dedicated to Polish physicist and chemist Marie Curie (1867–1934).

== History ==
The bronze monument was designed by Polish sculptor Marian Konieczny (with Stanisław Ciechan) and ceremonially unveiled on 24 October 1964. It is 9 metres high (including pedestal) and stands on Marie Skłodowska-Curie Square (Plac Marii Skłodowskiej-Curie), near Maria Curie-Skłodowska University (UMCS).

Marie Curie is depicted in a long robe and holding a book in her right hand. The pedestal inscriptions read: "To Maria Skłodowska-Curie, from the University Bearing Her Name, and from [Polish] Society" and "On the 20th Anniversary of the Founding of the University. 1944–1964."

== Gallery ==
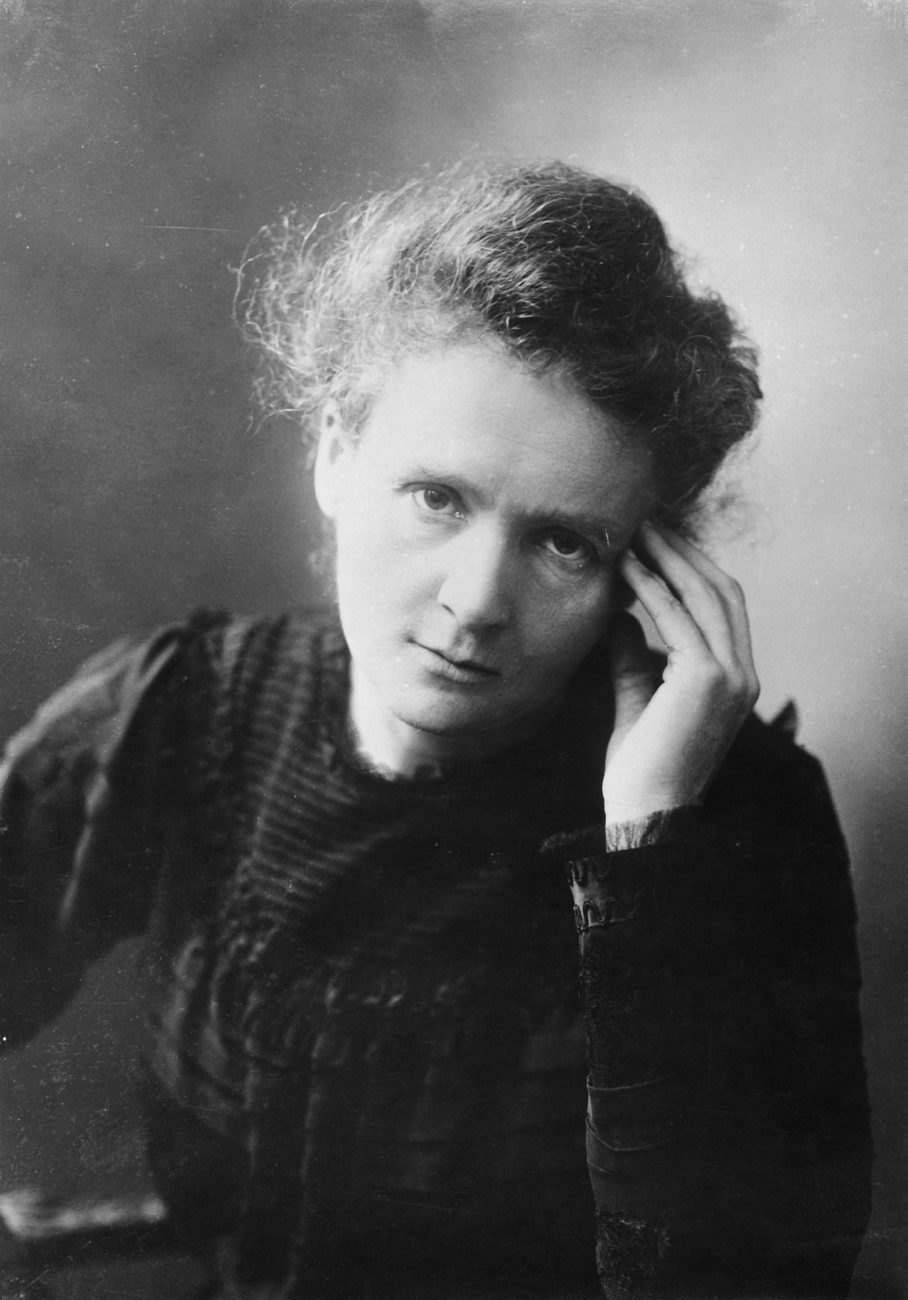
Marie Curie

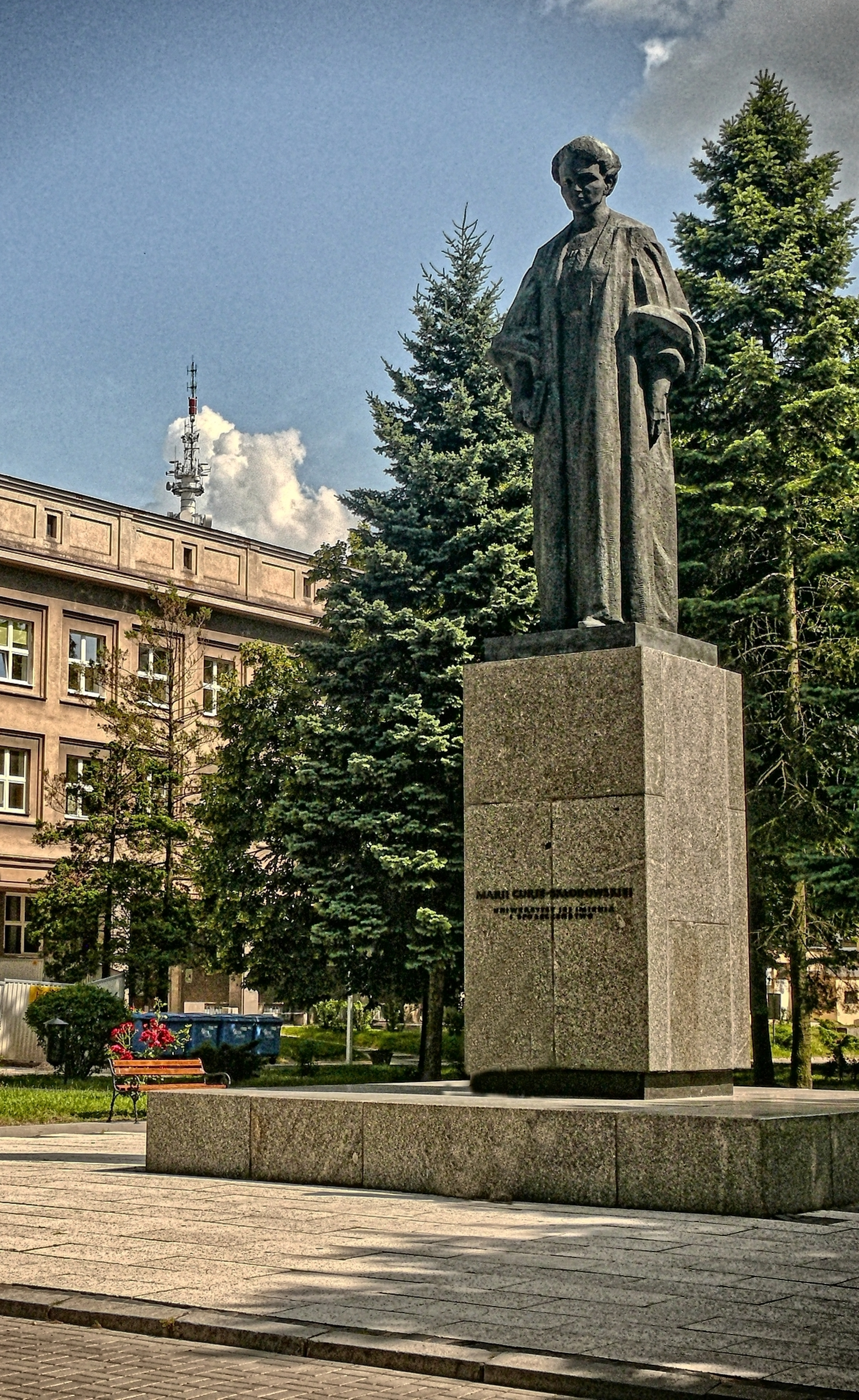
Marie Curie Monument

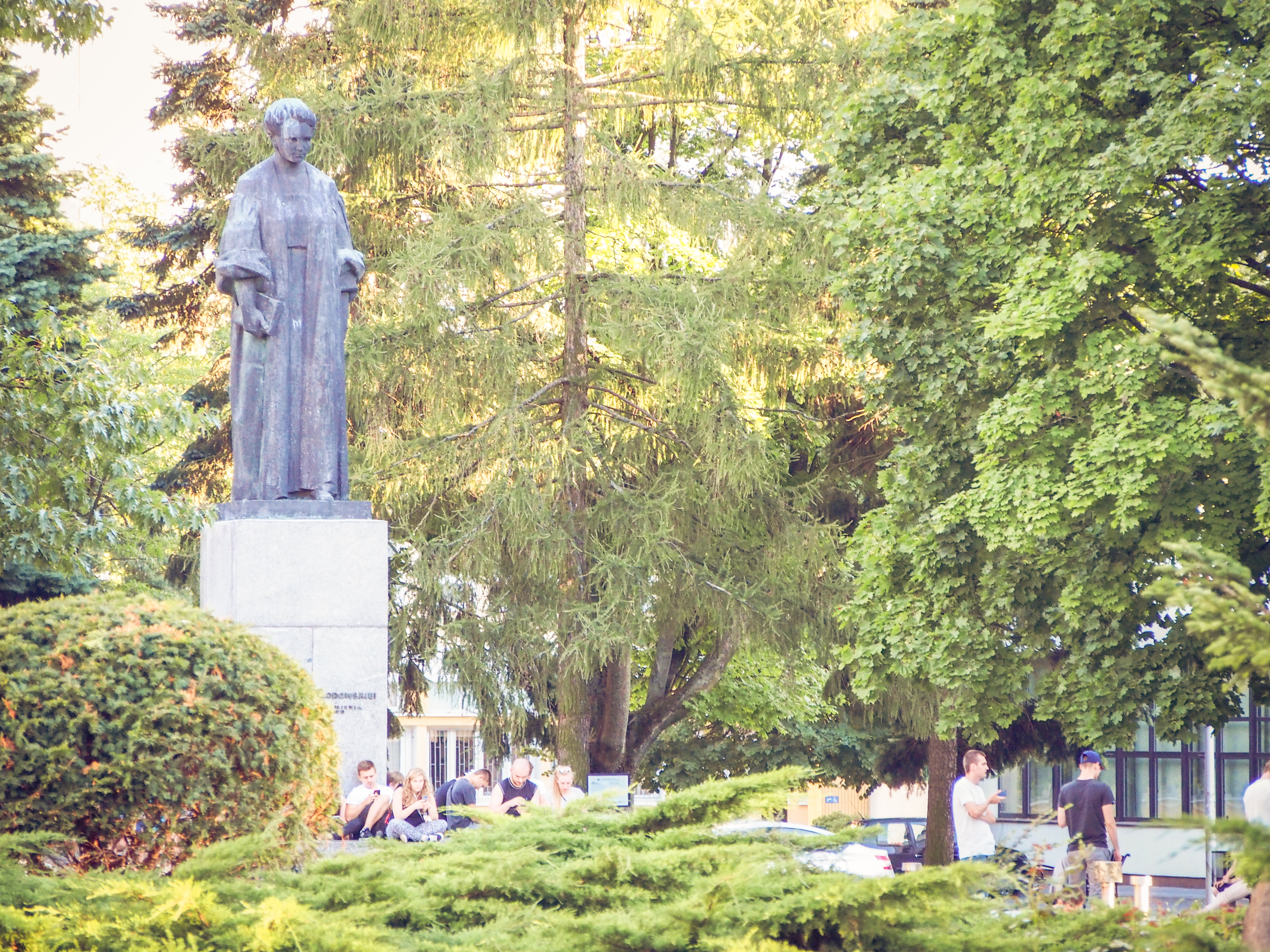
General view

== See also ==
- Maria Konopnicka Monument in Września
