= Sergei Pielasa =

Belarusian journalist

- Сяргей Пеляса (Belarusian)
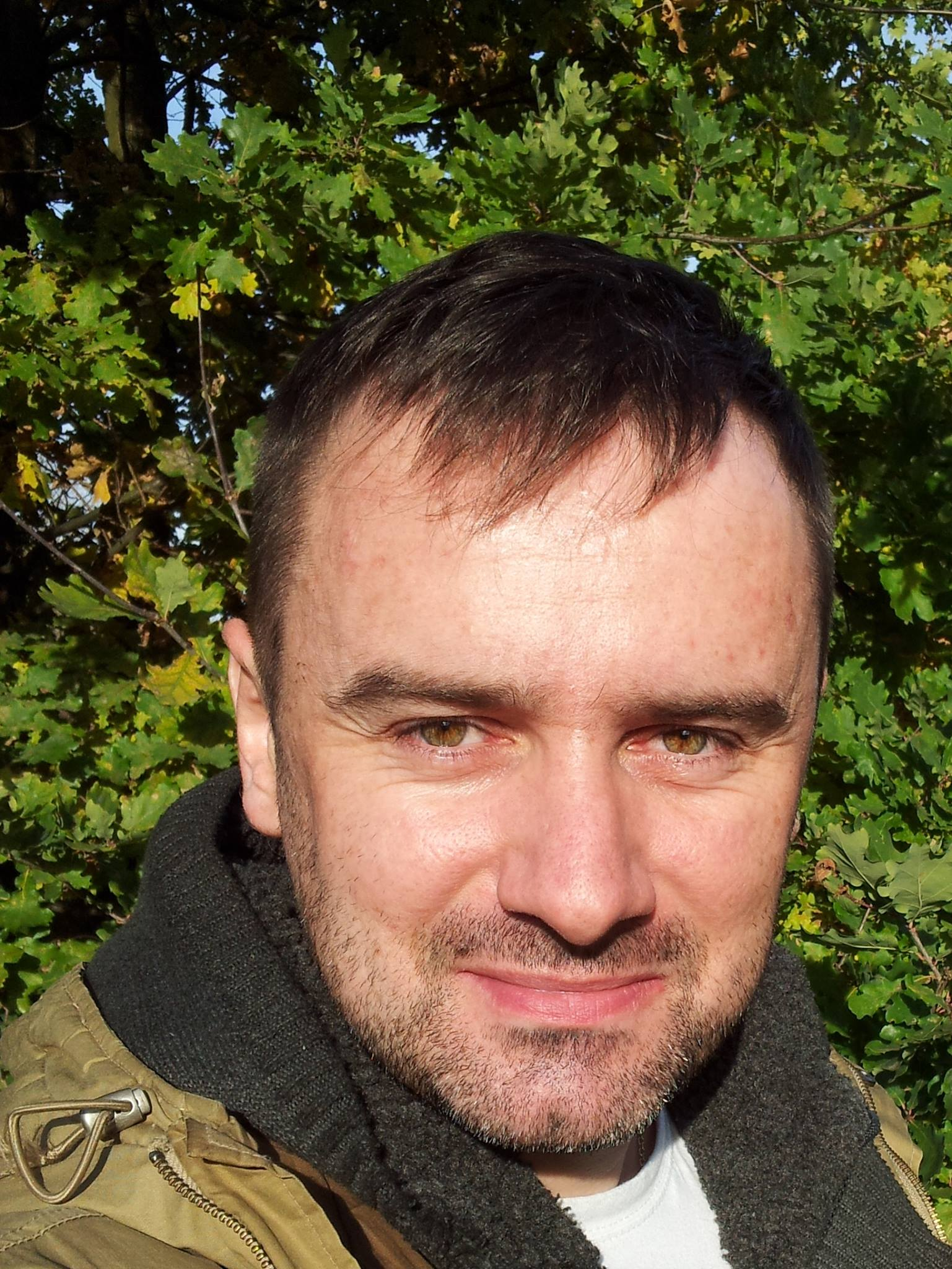
- Born: 1976 (age 49–50); Luninyets
- Education: Maria Curie-Skłodowska University in Lublin
- Occupation: Journalist
- Employer: Belsat TV

Sergei Pielasa (Belarusian: Сяргей Пеляса, Сергей Пелеса; born in 1976 in Luninyets) is a Belarusian journalist based in Poland. He serves as a press secretary, presenter, and editor for numerous programs and documentaries at Belsat TV, a Belarusian-language television station broadcasting from Poland.

== Biography ==
Sergei Pielasa was born in 1976 in Luninyets, located in the Luninyets district of the Brest region, within the Byelorussian Soviet Socialist Republic, Soviet Union. He spent his childhood and youth in Kobryn. Around 1996, he began studying construction at the Brest State Technical University. During this time, he was active in the independent youth organization Young Social Democrats – Young Hramada. In 1998, he was expelled from the university, officially for failing an exam, though Pielasa believes this was a reprisal for his social activism. He subsequently relocated to Poland.

From 2000, Pielasa studied at the Faculty of Political Science at Maria Curie-Skłodowska University in Lublin, graduating with a degree in international relations. During his studies in Poland, he engaged in citizen journalism through international projects.

Pielasa has been associated with Belsat TV, a Belarusian-language television station based in Poland, since its inception. He has served as the station's press secretary. In 2011, he was the lead editor in the station's programming secretariat. He is the producer and editor of the international magazine PraSwiet, the editor of Alaksandr Zaleuski's series Ludskija sprawy, and a series of reports from Ukraine titled Rewalucyja. He co-created and edited the series Historyja pad znakam Pahoni. Pielasa authored the documentary-reportage Żywie Biełaruś. Za kadram, which details the production of Krzysztof Łukaszewicz's film Viva Belarus!. He also produced the reports Rewalucyja on-łajn and co-authored Rewalucyja. Dedlajn. Additionally, he hosts the program Reparter. In September 2008, he represented Belsat TV at a civic picnic at Krakowskie Przedmieście in Warsaw.

From 2008 to April 2014, Pielasa worked as an editor for the documentary series Niewiadomaja Biełaruś. He was part of the production leadership for the Polish film Mińsk od świtu do zmierzchu in 2011. His professional interests include international security, military issues, and history. He also focuses on Belarusian-Polish relations.

== Views ==
Sergei Pielasa believes that Belarus under Alexander Lukashenko's leadership is not a democratic state. He highlights issues with civic freedoms and the marginalization of Belarusian culture and language, which he describes as being confined to a "narrow ghetto". Pielasa criticizes the 1995 decision by Belarusian authorities to replace national symbols, such as the white-red-white flag of Belarus and the Pahonia coat of arms, with Soviet-inspired symbols. However, he acknowledges Belarus' retention of independence as a legal entity. Pielasa argues that while Belarusian society has developed a state identity, efforts are needed to strengthen national identity and civic freedoms. He advocates for Belarus to reclaim the democratic achievements of the 1990s, integrate with European structures, build democracy and the rule of law, and establish a functioning local government, which he believes is virtually nonexistent.

== Awards ==
On 15 August 2001, in Cieszyn, Sergei Pielasa was awarded the title of Foreign Master of the Polish Language at the Fourth Polish Language Proficiency Test during the Summer School of Polish Language and Culture at the University of Silesia in Katowice. The following year, he served as an honorary jury member for the same competition.

== Personal life ==
Sergei Pielasa is married and has two children, twins – a daughter and a son. In his free time, he enjoys airsoft, analog photography, and cycling.
