= Maria Curie-Skłodowska University =

University in Lublin, Poland

Coordinates: 51°14′44″N 22°32′26″E

Maria Curie-Sklodowska University
- Uniwersytet Marii Curie-Skłodowskiej w Lublinie
- Latin: Universitas Maria Curie-Skłodowska
- Type: Public
- Established: October 23, 1944
- Affiliations: Erasmus; EUA; ATHENA European University; Związek Uczelni Lubelskich; EU FP5 and FP6; Gruntvig; LINGUA; Jean Monnet for Poland; Baltic University Programme; Lane Kirkland Scholarship Program
- Rector: Radosław Dobrowolski
- Total staff: 2,810
- Students: 15,632 (12.2023)
- Undergraduates: 9,261
- Postgraduates: 3,992
- Location: Lublin, Lublin Voivodeship, Poland
- Campus: Urban
- Website: www.umcs.pl/en

Maria Curie-Skłodowska University (MCSU) (Polish: Uniwersytet Marii Curie-Skłodowskiej w Lublinie, UMCS) is a public research university, in Lublin, Poland. It is named in honour of Marie Curie-Sklodowska.

The university was founded on October 23, 1944, by the Lublin Committee during the Second World War. Since then, It has expanded to be the largest university in Eastern Poland, with over 12 Faculties in Lublin, and a satellite campus in Puławy. The university has nearly 16,000 students, who study in over 90 disciplines. Out of those 16,000, over 1,600 are international students, who represent almost 45 countries.

The university belongs to the network of European Universities ATHENA, as well as smaller, regional organisations, such as Union of Lublin Universities (Polish: Związek Uczelni Lubelskich, ZUL). It maintains active contacts with foreign research centres, holding nearly 200 agreements on scientific and educational cooperation with foreign partners. MCSU also holds 330 Erasmus+ agreements, and a One-Year Preparatory Course for foreigners who wish to study Polish.

== History ==
The University of Maria Curie-Skłodowska was founded on October 23, 1944, three months after the Liberation of Lublin by the Red Army. Prof. Henryk Raabe became the first Rector, and would be the head of the university until 1948. On 3 April 1946, The university was gifted a 17,3-hectare (173,000 m^{2}) land grant, on then outskirts of the city, for the future Campus . This would later be expanded to 80 hectares (800,000 m^{2}). 1946 also marks the year when the Botanical Gardens, and the Annales Universitatis Mariae Curie-Skłodowska Journal, were created.

Initially, the university was made up of four faculties: Medicine, Agriculture, Veterinary Medicine, and Life Sciences. In 1949, Faculty of Law was created. One year later, the faculty of Medicine was excluded from the institution, and became the Medical University of Lublin. Similar fate was shared by the faculty of Life Sciences, when in 1955, the Faculty of Agriculture became the University of Life Sciences in Lublin. During the 1950s, more faculties were created, such as: Mathematics, Physics, Chemistry, Biology, Earth Sciences, Languages, and Economics.

The 1960s and 70s were marked by a rapid expansion of the Lublin Campus. New buildings were created for each of the faculties, the university library was created, along with residences for students, a sports hall, and a house of culture Chatka Żaka. Most of these changes were initiated by then rector, Grzegorz Leopold Seidler. In 1969, MCSU opened a branch campus in the city of Rzeszów. In 2001, that campus would merge with other institutions of the city to form the University of Rzeszów.

Major changes happened in 1989. Caused by the fall of communism in Poland, most of the faculties had to be reorganized. In 2014, MSCU opened a branch campus in Puławy, and in 2020, three new facilities were opened in Lublin for the Faculty of Political Science and Journalism, and the Institute of Psychology.

== Reputation ==
University rankings

Global – Overall
- CWUR World: 1496 (2022)
- THE World: 1201+ (2022)

Maria Curie-Skłodowska University maintains high academic standards. In 2017 it has been granted the right to display the HR Excellence in Research logo. In 2022 the university joined the prestigious consortium of European Universities - ATHENA (Advanced Technology Higher Education Network Alliance).

According to the Research.com MCSU ranks as the 18th best Polish university, and 1534th best in the world. Meanwhile, according to the Webometrics Ranking of World Universities, the university ranks as the 23rd best in Poland, out of 408, and 1612th best in the world.

== Authorities ==
UMCS Authorities 2020-2024
Position	Name and Surname
Rector	prof. dr hab. Radosław Dobrowolski
Vice-Rector for Development and Business Cooperation	dr hab. Zbigniew Pastuszak, prof. UMCS
Vice-Rector for Science and International Cooperation	prof. dr hab. Wiesław I. Gruszecki
Vice-Rector for Students and Quality of Education	prof. dr hab. Dorota Kołodyńska
Vice-Rector for General Affairs	dr hab. Arkadiusz Bereza, prof. UMCS
Chancellor of the University	mgr Grażyna Elżbieta Fiok

== Faculties ==
- Arts
- Biology and Biotechnology
- Chemistry
- Economics
- Languages, Literatures, and Cultures
- Philosophy and Sociology
- Mathematics, Physics, and Computer Science
- Earth Sciences and Spatial Management
- Education and Psychology
- Political Science and Journalism
- Law and Administration
- Off-Campus Branch in Pulawy

== Notable alumni ==
- Adam Krzymowski (born 1973), Polish political scientist and diplomat, Ambassador of Poland to the United Arab Emirates, 2011-2015
- Henryk Cioch (1951–2017), lawyer
- Zyta Gilowska (1949–2016), economist and politician
- Stanisław Michalkiewicz (born 1947), politician and activist
- Maciej Płaza (born 1976), writer and translator
- Paweł Brodzisz (born 1975), a Polish painter, photographer, graphic artist, he is also a regionalist, focusing on the Lublin and Silesia regions.
- Jarosław Stawiarski (born 1963), politician
- Roman Szporluk (born 1933), Ukrainian and American historian, professor emeritus, doctor of historical sciences
- Sergei Pielasa (born 1976), Belarusian journalist

== Publications ==
The university publishes the following journals:

- Acta Humana (ISSN 2082-4459)
- Annales Universitatis Mariae Curie-Skłodowska
  - sectio A – Mathematica (ISSN 0365-1029)
  - sectio AA – Chemia (ISSN 0137-6853
  - sectio AAA – Physica (ISSN 0137-6861)
  - sectio B – Geographia, Geologia, Mineralogia et Petrographia (ISSN 0137-1983)
  - sectio C – Biologia (ISSN 0066-2232)
  - sectio F – Historia (ISSN 0239-4251)
  - sectio FF – Philologiae (ISSN 0239-426X)
  - sectio G – Ius (ISSN 0458-4317)
  - sectio H – Oeconomia (ISSN 0459-9586)
  - sectio I – Philosophia-Sociologia (ISSN 0137-2025)
  - sectio J – Paedagogia-Psychologia (ISSN 0867-2040)
  - sectio K – Politologia (ISSN 1428-9512)
  - sectio L – Artes (ISSN 1732-1352)
  - sectio M – Balcaniensis et Carpathiensis (ISSN 2450-6354)
  - sectio N – Educatio Nova (ISSN 2451-0491)
- Anuario Latinoamericano – Ciencias Políticas y Relaciones Internacionales (ISSN 2392-0343)
- Artes Humanae (ISSN 2449-6340)
- Etnolingwistyka. Problemy Języka i Kultury (ISSN 0860-8032)
- Folia Bibliologica ISSN 1230-2376
- Kultura i Wartości (ISSN 2299-7806)
- Lubelski Rocznik Pedagogiczny (ISSN 0137-6136)
- Lublin Studies in Modern Languages and Literature (ISSN 2450-4580)
- New Horizons in English Studies (ISSN 2543-8980)
- Polish Journal of Soil Science (ISSN 0079-2985)
- Prima Educatione (ISSN 2544-2317)
- Przegląd Prawa Administracyjnego (ISSN 2545-2525)
- Res Historica (ISSN 2082-6060
- Studenckie Zeszyty Naukowe (ISSN 1506-8285)
- Studia Białorutenistyczne (ISSN 1898-0457)
- Studia Iuridica Lublinensia (ISSN 1731-6375)
- TEKA of Political Science and International Relations (ISSN 1896-8279)
- Wschód Europy. Studia humanistyczno-społeczne (ISSN 2450-4866)
- Zeszyty Cyrylo-Metodiańskie (ISSN 2449-8297)

== Botanic Garden ==
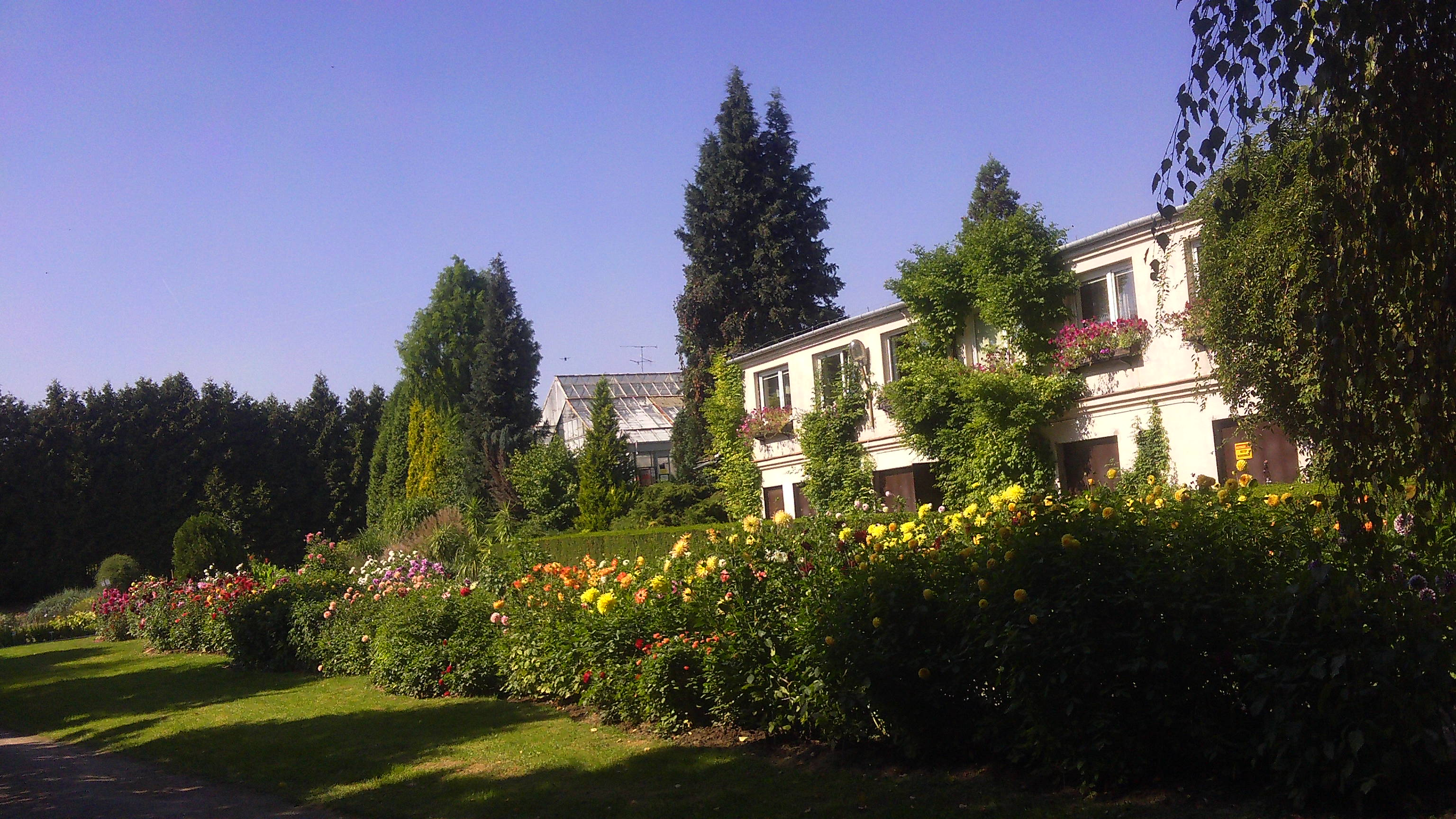

Founded in 1946 and originally a part of the campus of the university. In 1951, a new location of the Garden in Sławinek (a district in Lublin) was approved. In 1958, the university obtained the property rights of 13-hectare (130,000 m^{2}) area. It has about 6,500 species of flora growing here, gathered in several area, among others, a rosarium, a branch of water plants and an alpine garden. It also features a reconstructed noble manor house from the second half of the 18th century. Between 2012 and 2013, 418 species of moths in total were recorded in the Botanical Garden.

== Gallery ==
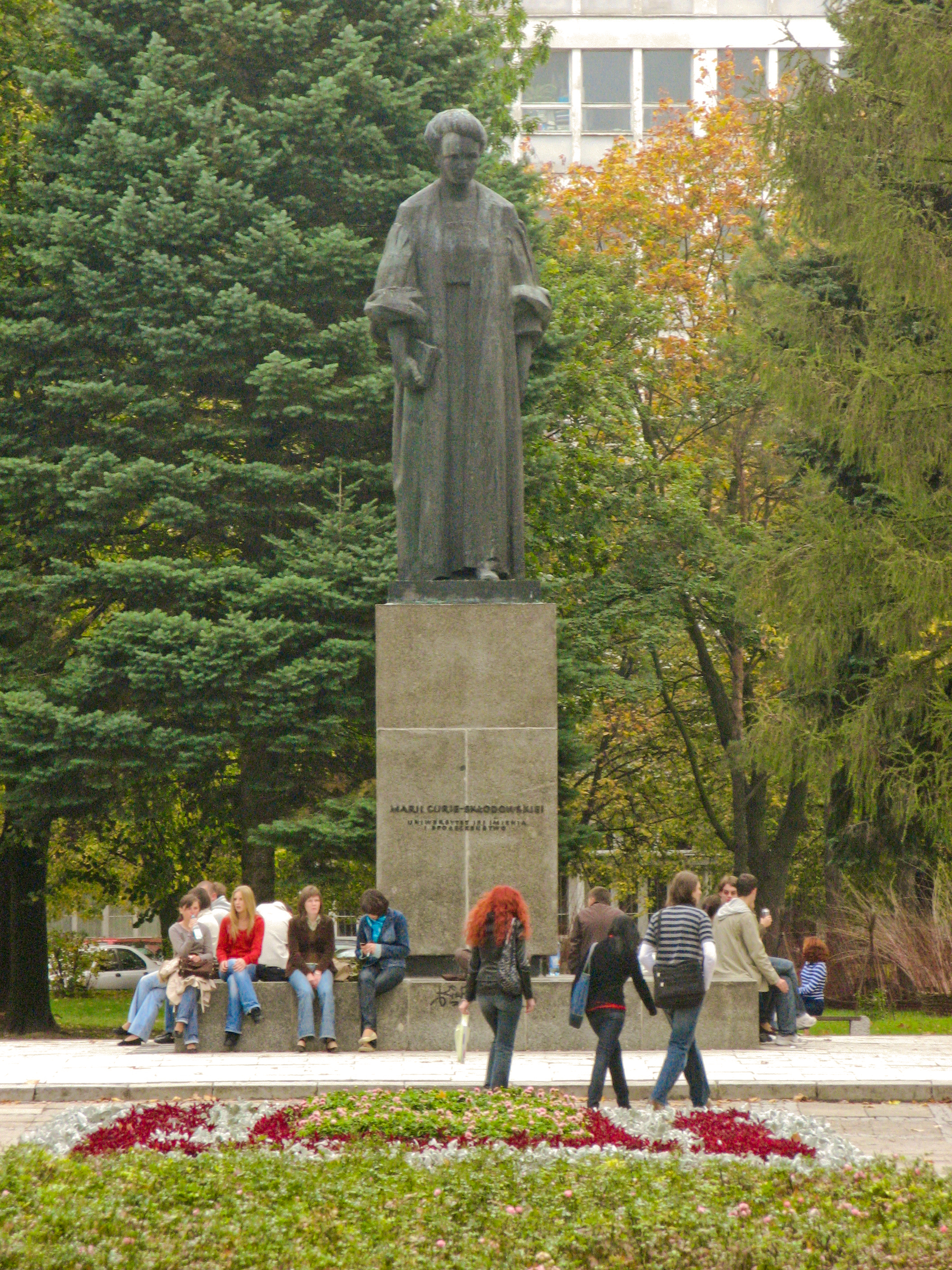
Marie Curie Monument in Lublin

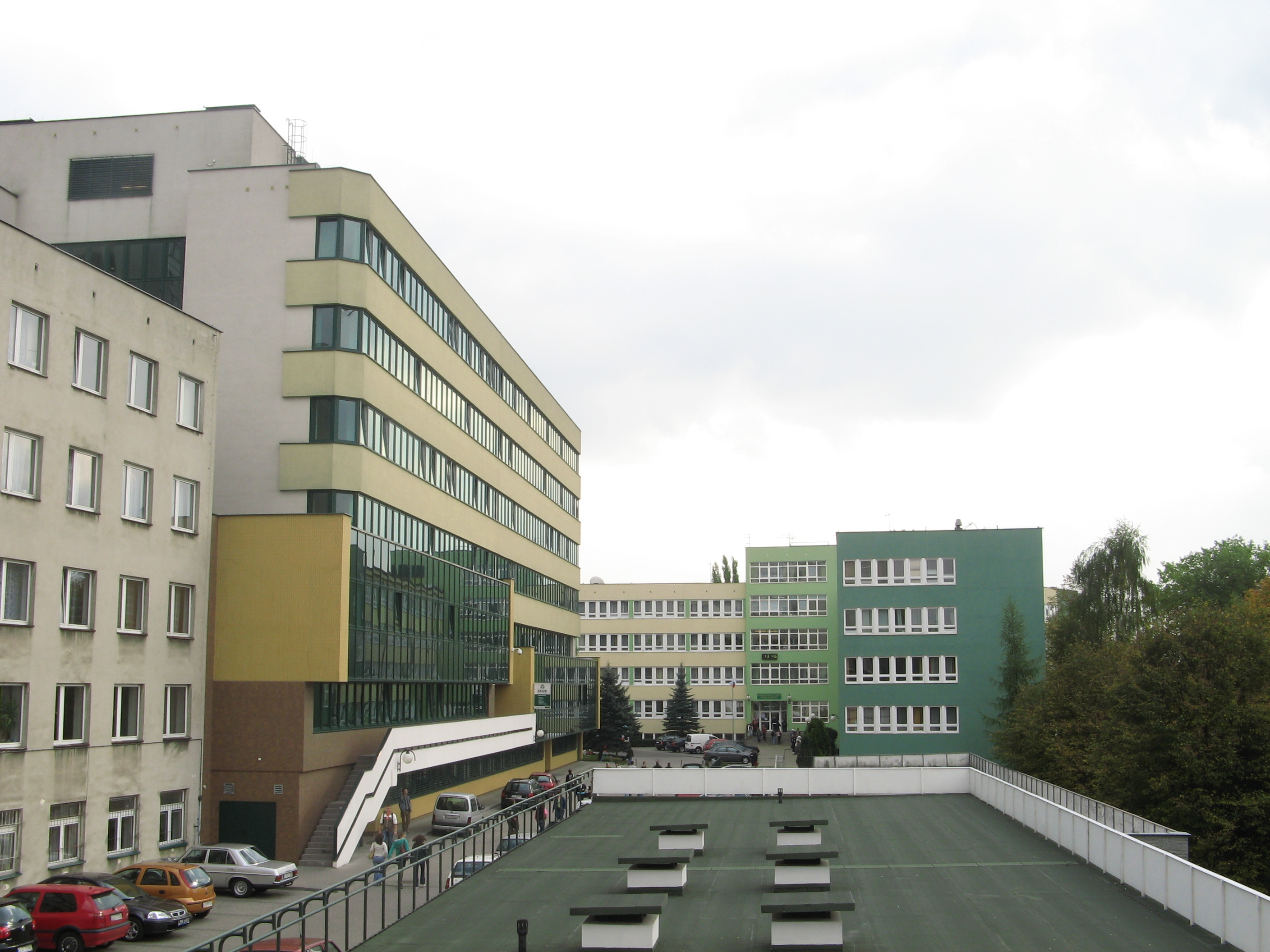
Building of the Department of Humanities

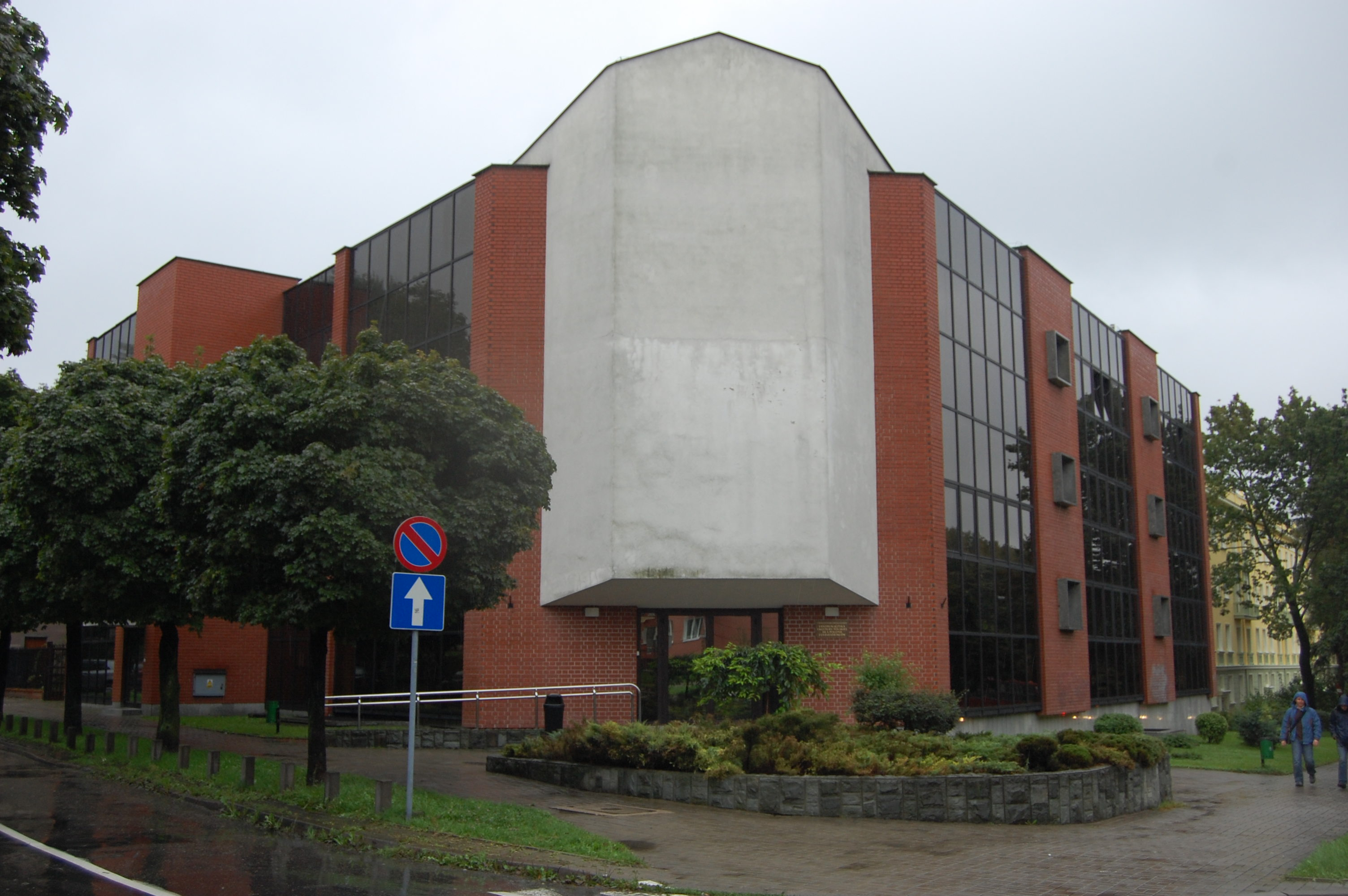
The Faculty of Polish Philology

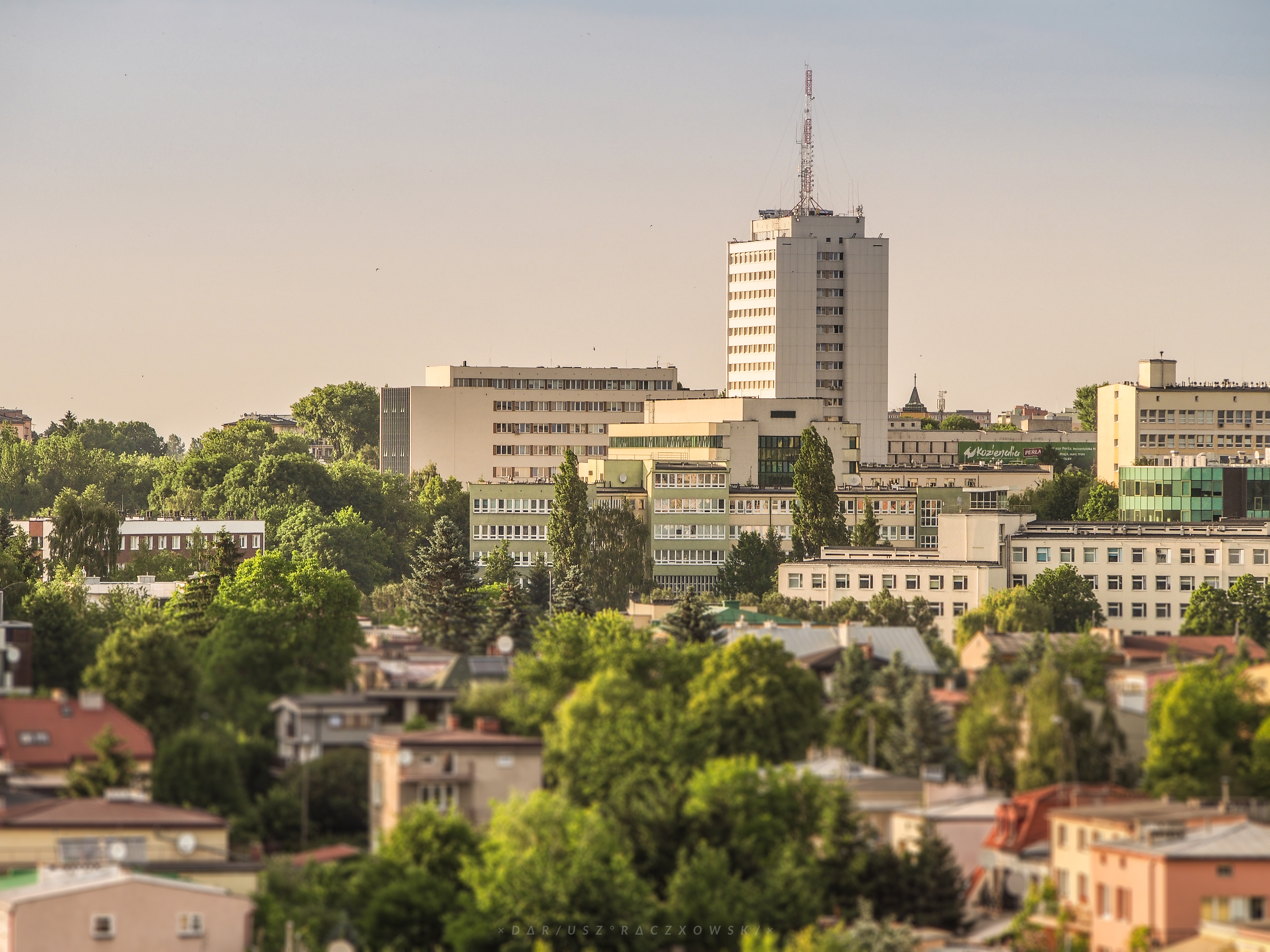
View of the Rector's Office

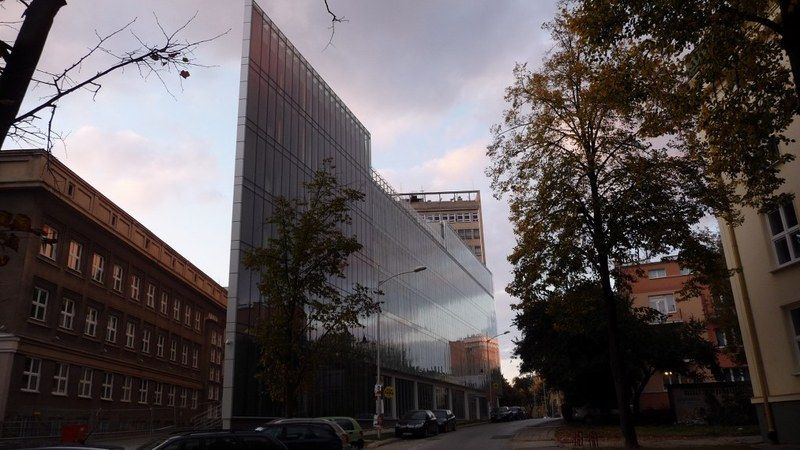
Institute of Information Technology

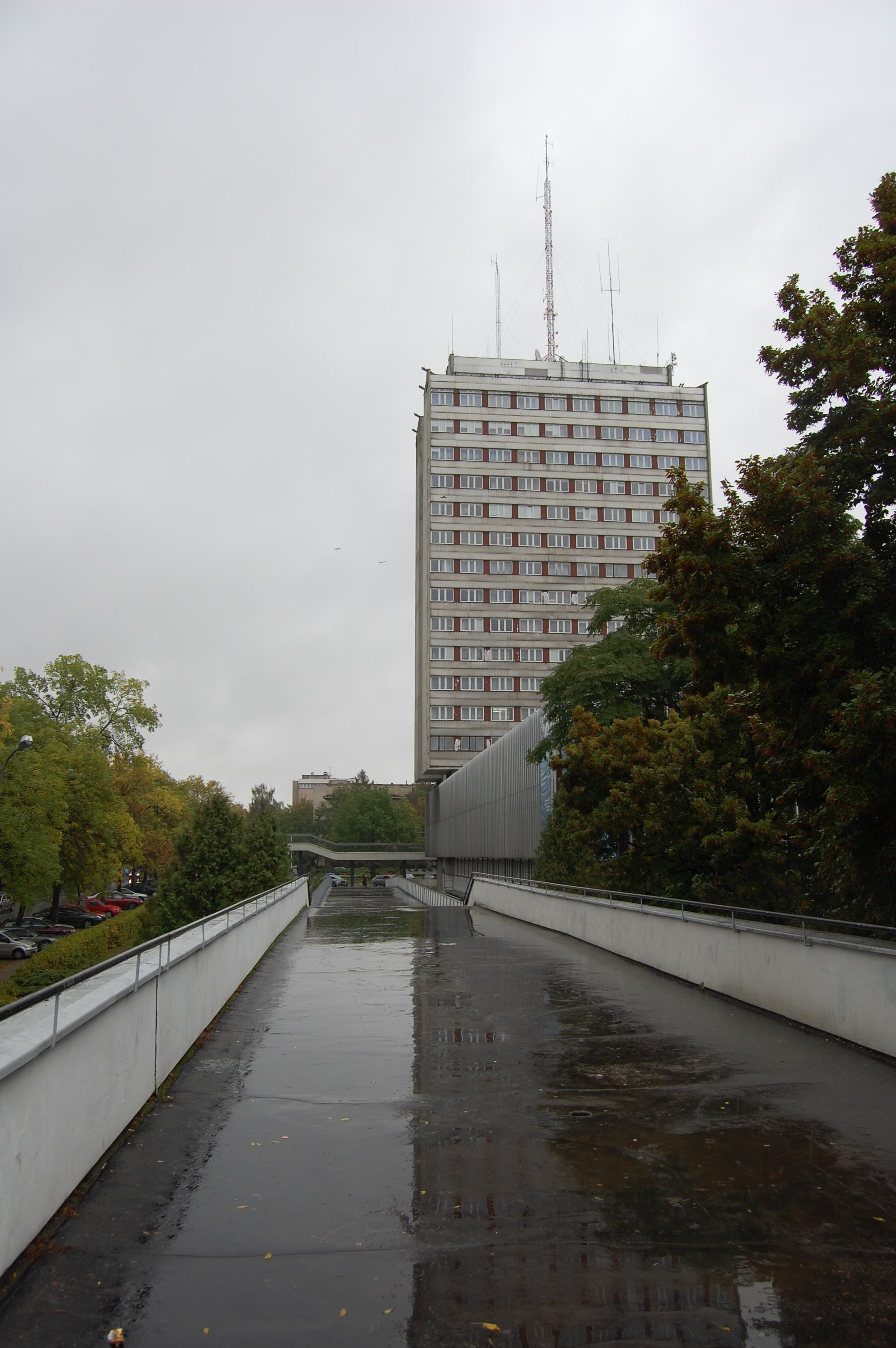
The main building of Marie Curie University as viewed from Sowińskiego St
