= Anastasia Mejía =

Guatemalan indigenous journalist

Anastasia Mejía Tiriquiz (born c. 1970) is a Guatemalan Kʼicheʼ journalist who reports on indigenous affairs in the town of Joyabaj. She received international attention in 2020 when she was arrested and charged with sedition after reporting on a protest against the municipal government; the charges were dropped in 2021.

== Personal life ==
Mejía was born and raised in Joyabaj, Quiché Department, Guatemala. She is a member of the Kʼicheʼ community, where she acts as an Ajq'ij, a Mayan spiritual guide.

== Journalism career ==
Mejía has worked as a journalist covering the Kʼicheʼ community in Joyabaj since 2009, broadcasting in both Kʼicheʼ and Spanish. After working for various local media organisations, in 2013 she founded Xolobaj (Kʼicheʼ for 'a place between the stones'), a radio station focusing on indigenous and women's issues. In 2017, Mejía launched Xolobaj TV, a Facebook page which included video reports and live reporting.

=== 2020 arrest ===
On 24 August 2020, Mejía was the only journalist on the scene during a protest of predominantly Kʼicheʼ merchants who were calling on Joyabaj's mayor, Florencio Carrascoza, to reinstate their permits to sell produce, which had been temporarily revoked due to the COVID-19 pandemic. Mejía broadcast the protest live on Xolobaj TV's Facebook page, which culminated with protestors looting Joyabaj's municipal buildings.

On 22 September 2020, the National Civil Police arrested Mejía, alongside indigenous unionist Petrona Siy, without warrants. Mejía was accused of taking part in the protest, and subsequently charged with sedition, aggravated attack, arson, and aggravated robbery. She was remanded without trial for 37 days in a prison in Quetzaltenango. Mejía's lawyer, Ana López, stated that Mejía's detention was contrary to Guatemalan law, which stated that a court hearing must be held within 48 hours of an arrest taking place.

On 28 October 2020, Mejía had her first court appearance in Santa Cruz del Quiché. On 29 October 2020, she was released after paying a $2500 bond. She was subject to "substitutive measures" which prohibited her from leaving Quiché Department as well as from approaching municipal politicians; her charges were reduced to arson and sedition. Mejía's trial was delayed when, in April 2021, the allocated judge, Susy Peréz, was excused from the case after being accused of discrimination against indigenous people.

PEN International criticised the charges against Mejía and stated that they were contrary to article 35 of the Guatemalan constitution, which guaranteed freedom of expression. In January 2021, over 50 human rights organisations issued a joint statement calling on Guatemalan authorities to drop the criminal charges against Mejía, stating that the "disproportionate charges and erratic judicial process seem aimed less at justice than toward intimidating community journalists like Mejía".

On 3 September 2021, the charges against Mejía were dismissed. The state prosecutor stated their intention to appeal the ruling.

== Political career ==
By 2015, Mejía had a rising local profile after criticising the municipal government; as a result, she was invited by the Patriotic Party to run as a candidate in municipal elections for Joyabaj. She was ultimately successful, and served on the council until 2020, when she opted to leave her role to focus on journalism. During her tenure as a councillor, Mejía was critical of the Mayor of Joyabaj, Florencio Carrascoza, stating she and others were discriminated against by him due to being indigenous, and twice requested for the local judiciary to investigate his treatment of workers. Carrascoza subsequently accused Mejía of trying to "defame" him.

== Recognition ==
In 2021, Mejía won the Committee to Project Journalists' International Press Freedom Award in recognition of the "vital role" she played in keeping the indigenous community informed, in addition to operating in "increasingly challenging" conditions for journalists in Guatemala. Other laureates that year included Katsiaryna Barysevich, Matías Guente and Aye Chan Naing.
