= Vitali Silitski =

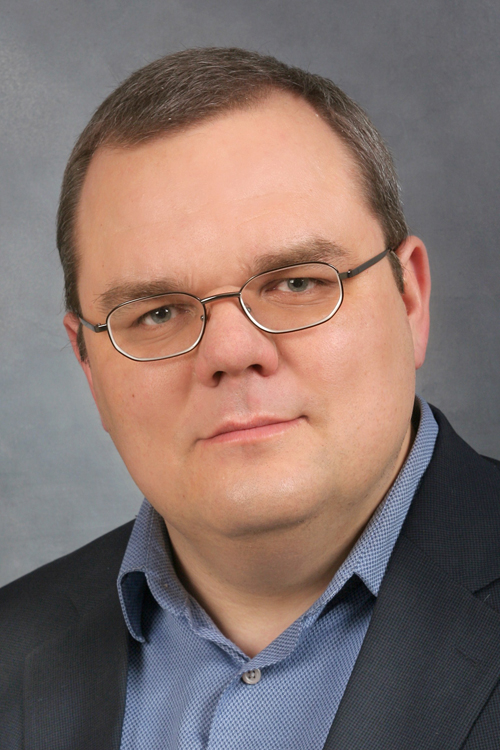
- Vitali Silitski in 2008
- Born: 25 December 1972; Minsk, Byelorussian SSR, USSR
- Died: 11 June 2011 (aged 38); Minsk, Belarus
- Citizenship: Belarus
- Education: Belarusian State University, Minsk; Central European University, Budapest; Rutgers University, New Jersey
- Known for: political scientist; social scientist; analyst; author and developer of the concepts of preventive authoritarianism and authoritarian international
- Scientific career
- Fields: political science; sociology
- Workplaces: Belarisan Institute for Strategic Studies (Vilnius)
- Doctoral advisor: Robert R. Kaufman

Vitali Silitski (Belarusian: Віталь Сіліцкі; Russian: Виталий Вячеславович Силицкий; 25 December 1972 – 11 June 2011) was a Belarusian political scientist, analyst, the first director of the Belarusian Institute for Strategic Studies. He got his PhD in political science from the Rutgers University (New Jersey, U.S.). Silitski is the author of the concepts of preventive authoritarianism and authoritarian international. He was also a civil activist and blogger.

== Biography ==
Vitali Silitski was born in Minsk, BSSR, USSR. His mother is a teacher in a kindergarten; his father and brother are of working specialties.

In 1989–1994 he studied at the Belarusian State University in Minsk at the Department of Economics and Philosophy. He got a diploma with honours in Sociology awarded in June 1994. Topic of thesis: “The Formation of Political Elite in Belarus”.

In 1993–1994 Vitali studied at the Central European University in Budapest. Was awarded the Master in Politics degree in August, 1994. Topic of thesis: “The Political Aspects of the Privatization Process in Eastern Europe”.

In 1994–1999 he studied at the Rutgers University (New Brunswick, NJ, United States). Was awarded the PhD degree in political science in October 1999. Topic of PhD dissertation: “Constraints and Coalitions: Politics of Economic Reform in Central and Eastern Europe after Return of the Left”. Supervisor: PhD Robert R. Kaufman.

In 1999–2003 Vitali worked as associate professor at Department of Economics in the European Humanities University (EHU) in Minsk (on leave March–August 1999 and October 2001-April 2002). He was forced to quit by administration for publicly criticising the government of Alexander Lukashenko.

While working at EHU, Vitali has designed and taught courses "The Political Economy of Policy Reform in Eastern Europe and Latin America", Introduction to International Political Economy", "International Political Economy of Industrialization in East Asia", "Economic Policy", “The Political Economy of European Integration”, “From Totalitarianism to Civil Society: Social and Political Transformation of East Central Europe” to undergraduate and graduate students.

In October 2004-July 2005 Vitali was awarded a Reagan-Fascell Democracy Fellowship at the International Forum for Democratic Studies in the National Endowment for Democracy at Washington D.C., United States.

In February 2006-February 2007 he got visiting scholarship at the Center on Democracy, Development, and the Rule of Law at Stanford University (sponsored by Stanford and Scholars Rescue Fund, Institute for International Education).

As an independent expert Vitali participated in research of the non-governmental organisation Freedom House, and cooperated with Radio Free Europe/Radio Liberty and international consulting company Oxford Analytica.

In 2007–2011 Vitali Silitski worked as the director of the Belarusian Institute for Strategic Studies, the analytic center created in October 2006 by a group of famous public figures and intellectuals and registered in Lithuania. The Institute develops and offers positive alternative scenarios of political, economic, and social transformation of the country, and lays out ways to enhance the competitiveness of Belarus and the welfare of Belarusian citizens.

When Silitski discovered he had kidney cancer in July 2010, his friends and colleagues supported him. The surgical removal of a kidney, made in Belarus, did not help and an international fundraising campaign was organized. Silitski had spent much time in a hospital in Belgium, but the cancer was progressing and he returned to Belarus, where he spent his last days with his friends and family. “I am dying. But make everything to keep alive the ideas I lived for”, said Silitski to his friends.

Silitski died on 11 June 2011, at the age of 38, after living with cancer for nearly a year.

== Main concepts ==
Preventive (preempting) authoritarianism: type of authoritarianism under which preservation of power is achieved via preempting (preventing) attacks (in opposite to reactive answers under manipulative authoritarianism) against potential threats (political opponents, uncontrolled mass media, civil society, human rights defenders, non-governmental organisations, etc.), and also via violations of election legislation even in a situation of definite advantages and possibility to win fairly.

Authoritarian International: joining efforts of authoritarian regimes to combat democratic contagion and their capacity to organise internationally and establish some sort of self-defense; it is preemption at the international level and ability of authoritarian rulers to learn from mistakes of their colleagues and success of democracy building in other countries. It is a counter process of democracy contagion at the international level.

Preempting authoritarianism (including case study Belarus) and its development into Authoritarian international are presented in Vitali Silitski working paper Contagion Deterred: Preemptive Authoritarianism in the Former Soviet Union (the Case of Belarus), 2006, for Center on Democracy, Development, and The Rule of Law at Stanford University.

Territory of Freedom: independent environment, way of life organisation of people who disagree with the current regime, united by common interests and activities; a parallel society, where expenses of existing in it are compensated by a high level of mutual assistance and coordination, what gives a chance to dissident movement to become a real political power in future.

Postponed Freedom: one of the main texts of Vitali Silitski describing via comparative analysis the processes of spring and maturing of personalistic regimes in Serbia and Belarus.

Rodger Potocki, senior director for Europe, National Endowment for Democracy (U.S.) formulated a range of leading ideas of main Silitski's texts:

- To work inside, not outside the country
- Unified Opposition
- Political NGOs
- Be Engaged
- Profound Scepticism of Russia
- Democracy Promotion as a Noble Act.

== Acknowledgement by colleagues ==
According to political scientist Lucan Way (University of Toronto), Vitali Silitski was among the first to put authoritarian regimes in the international context. Many in the 1990s and the early 2000s wrote about democratic diffusion, but Vitali started a discussion about counter-diffusion. In a sense he created a new research agenda on the spread of authoritarianism. One of his concepts was what he called the authoritarian international – basically efforts to respond to external challenges by increasing coordination among non-democratic states.

Chrystia Freeland, the editor of Thomson Reuters, frequently refers to Silitski's works. One of the last her acknowledgment is referring to the concept of Authoritarian International in her analysis for Reuters of the events in Egypt and Tunisia, called The Authoritarian International goes on the defensive (February 4, 2011).

According to Paval Daneika, director of the Belarusian Economic Research and Outreach Center, Silitski contributed to academic analysis in Belarus by bringing together a new generation of experts who present their research internationally.

Stephan Malerius from Konrad Adenauer Stiftung (Germany) regrets that there was no person around Silitski able to transform his research into a political plan. Malerius notes that Silitski consulted politicians when asked, but he was not a political technologist and didn't want to be so.

Silitski was also remembered in the January 2012 issue of NED's Journal of Democracy, which called him “the best political scientist of his generation to emerge from the former Soviet Union,” and at the May 2012 event marking the 10th anniversary of the Reagan-Fascell Program, which noted that “Vitali was a prolific author and leading activist.”

== Public activity ==
Silitski was a Belarusian political activist who supported democratic reforms and closer integration with Europe. He advocated for the promotion of the Belarusian language and the preservation of national culture.

Vitali as a common citizen took parts in meetings and rallies of the opposition, including peace protests against falsification of the results of the presidential elections in December 2010. Vitali went there being already sick and brutal dispersal of participants had an adverse effect on him. Later he participated in solidarity actions with detained and political prisoners.

In 1992 Silitski, then a student, joined the United Democratic Party of Belarus (later United Civic Party of Belarus), to work in its youth organisation. And though for long time he did not participate actively in the Party work, officially he left it in 2010 as a sign of protest against behaviour of the party presidential candidate for elections 2010 Yaraslau Ramanchuk, after the crackdown of peaceful demonstration and arrest of oppositional candidates.

Vitali Silitski was a Belarusian LiveJournal blogger named nescerka. But he deleted his account, and with it his popularity and more than 500 friends. Soon he came back under own name, and to his own admission “put a certain responsibility for the row”, and that asked not to wait for "hooliganism" and "trolling of feminists" from him. But in the livejournal, vitalsilitski only posted three times, and Vitali Silitski moved to Facebook. Now the wall of his profile looks like memorial plate.

== Awards ==
May 1991 Winner of the USSR-wide competition of young sociologists, Moscow State University. Topic of research: “Tocqueville and Democratic Transformation in Eastern Europe.”

In 1999 received Margaret Thatcher Trophy from the European Young Conservatives.

== In memoriam ==
In their memories about Silitski his friends and colleagues noted that it was impossible not to become friends with him, he entered the life of everybody he met. Silitski was also a fan of the football club Liverpool. He shared other interesting information about himself, publishing on Facebook 25+1 random facts about him.

In 2011, at the Central European University (Budapest, Hungary), where Silitski obtained master's degree, the Vitali Silitski supplementary annual scholarship for Belarusian students was established. Eligible students should demonstrate academic excellence, a commitment to social activism, and financial need. Scholarship founders believe that Vitali's memory will be a guiding example for future generations of Belarusian professionals around the world.

The Institute of European Studies and International Relations (IESIR, Slovakia) and Belarusian Institute for Strategic Studies (BISS, Lithuania) with support of Slovak Agency for International Development Cooperation (Slovak Aid) launched a fellowship program for Belarusian students interested in a 5-6 month study stay in Slovakia. The primary goal of the fellowship program is to improve skills, knowledge and qualifications of Belarusian students in the field of European integration, institution building and good governance. In 2011, first six participants were selected.

On September 8, 2011, National Endowment for Democracy, the Center for Strategic and International Studies and PONARS Eurasia organized in Washington D.C. an expert panel “The political future of Belarus” with the tribute to Vitali Silitski.

On February 29, 2012, the book of Vitali Silitski Postponed Freedom (Belarusian “Адкладзеная свабода”) was published post-mortem opening series Library of Belarusian Collegiums.

On the anniversary of Vitali Silitski death, June 11, 2012, the Commemoration evening took place with participation of relatives, friends, colleagues, and foreign diplomats. To the memory of Vitali Silitski the special issue of Belarus Headlines, was devoted (that is monthly pdf-magazine, a joint project of the Office for a Democratic Belarus, the Belarusian Institute for Strategic Studies (Vilnius, Lithuania), and Belarus Digest (London, UK), in English).

In May, 2012, on the eve of Silitski's obit, the Vitali Silitski Commemoration Committee was founded by well-known scientists and civil activists, who were close to Vitali.

The Commemoration Committee was created to run activities and events of memory, such as publication of Silitski's books, registration of the fund named after him, organisation of nomination named after Silitski and his scholarship programme, etc.

On June 18, 2012, to honour the memory of Vitali Silitski, Carnegie Endowment for International Peace (Washington, DC, U.S.) hosted a discussion about the current situation in Belarus with Tatiana Kouzina from BISS, Sergej Satsuk from Ezhednevnik, the first Belarusian electronic newspaper, and Olga Stuzhinskaya from the Office for a Democratic Belarus, a Brussels-based NGO. Balasz Jarabik, from the Kyiv-based office of Pact, Inc., introduced the panel. Rodger Potocki of the National Endowment for Democracy provided the opening remarks in memory of Vitali Silitski. Carnegie's Matthew Rojansky moderated.

== Works ==
=== Books ===
Author of the book Postponed Freedom: Post communist authoritarianism in Serbia and Belarus (in Belarusian “Адкладзеная свабода: посткамуністычны аўтарытарызм у Сербіі і Беларусі”) published in the magazine ARCHE in 2002, and printed in 2012 post mortem.)

Co-author with Jan Zaprudnik of the second edition of Historical Dictionary of Belarus (Historical Dictionaries of Europe), 2007, ISBN 0810858126).

Currently his book “The Long Road from the Tyranny” is prepared for publication post mortem, both in English (original) and Belarusian (translated) versions.

=== Books edited by Vitali Silitski ===
- Беларусь: вызовы социально-экономического развития (in Russian) / Под ред. В.Силицкого. – СПб.: Невский простор, 2011. – 192 с.
- Социальные контракты в современной Беларуси (in Russian) / Под ред. К.Гайдука, Е.Раковой и В.Силицкого. – СПб.: Невский простор, 2009. – 224 с.
- Беларуская палітычная сцэна і прэзыдэнцкія выбары 2006 году / Пад рэд. В.Булгакава і В.Сіліцкага.- Інстытут Беларусістыкі, 2006. (на белорусском языке)

=== Chapters in books ===
- Belarus // Nations in Transit 2007-2011: Democratization from Central Europe to Eurasia / Rowman & Littlefield Publishers, Inc. (Freedom House publication), 2007–2011.
- Belarus (with Balasz Jarabik) // Is the European Union Supporting Democracy in its Neighbourhood? / Richard Youngs. - FRIDE in association with the European Council on Foreign Relations (2008)
- Belarus and Russia: Comradeship-in-arms in Preempting Democracy // Political Trends in the New Eastern Europe: Ukraine and Belarus / Vitali Silitski and Arkady Moshes. - Strategic Studies Institute U.S. Army War Co (2007).
- Contagion Deterred: Preemptive Authoritarianism in the Former Soviet Union (the Case of Belarus) // Waves and Troughs of Post-Communist Transitions / Michael McFaul and Kathryn Stoner-Weiss, eds.- Johns Hopkins University Press, 2007.
- Different Authoritarianisms, Different Patterns of Change // Civil society and Electoral Change in Central and Eastern Europe / Bratislava: German Marshall Fund, 2006.
- Signs of Hope Rather Than Electoral Revolution // Prospects for Democracy in Belarus / Pavol Deves, David Marples, and Joergg Forbig – German Marshall Fund, 2006.
- Internal Developments in Belarus // Changing Belarus. Chaillot Paper / Don Lynch. – Paris: Institute for Security Studies, 2005.
- Belarusian Economy: Diagnosis and Motivation for Reform; Perspectives of European Integration for Belarus // Belarus: Catching Up with Europe / Warsaw: The Bathory Foundation, 2004.
- Range of chapters // Палітычная гісторыя незалежнай Беларусі (да 2006)(in Belarusian) / Вільня: Беларускае гістарычнае таварыства Беласток, Інстытут беларусістыкі Вільня, 2012.
- Беларусь в международном контексте // Беларусь и Европейский Союз: от изоляции к сотрудничеству (in Russian)/ Ханц-Георг Вик, Штэфан Малериус. —Вильнюс: Фонд Конрада Аденауэра, 2011.
- Дилеммы выбора // Беларусь: ни Европа, ни Россия. Мнения белорусских элит(in Russian) / Валерий Булгаков. – Варшава, 2006.
- Расклад і тэндэнцыі пасьля выбараў і рэфэрэндуму 2004 г. // Найноўшая гісторыя беларускага парлямэнтарызму(in Belarusian) / Валер Булгакаў. – Беласток, 2005.
- Беларусь: анатомія прэвэнтыўнага аўтарытарызму // Геапалітычнае месца Беларусі ў Эўропе і сьвеце / Валер Булгакаў. – Варшава: Вышэйшая школа гандлю і права, 2006. – С. 47–81. – 242 с. ISBN 978-83-60694-01-5. (на белорусском языке)
- Дыягназ беларускай эканомікі; Матывацыя эканамічных рэформаў у Беларусі; Пэрспэктывы эўрапейскай інтэграцыі Беларусі // Беларусь: сцэнары рэформаў(in Belarusian) / Алесь Анціпенка, Валер Булгакаў. – Варшава: Фонд імя Сцяпана Батуры, 2003.
- Рэжым Лукашэнкі паміж дзьвюма выбарчымі кампаніямі: вонкавыя і ўнутраныя фактары (дэ)легітымізацыі; Крызыс апазыцыі пасьля прэзыдэнцкіх выбараў 2001 году; Зьмяненьне палітычнага раскладу пасьля мясцовых выбараў і пэрспэктывы наступных выбарчых кампаній // Мясцовыя выбары ў найноўшай палітычнай гісторыі Беларусі(in Belarusian) / Валер Булгакаў. – Менск: Аналітычны Грудок, 2003.
- Эканамічная палітыка Лукашэнкі // Беларуска-расейская інтэграцыя. Аналітычныя артыкулы / Валер Булгакаў. – Менск: Энцыклапедыкс, 2002. (in Belarusian language)

=== Articles ===
- Debating the Color Revolutions: What Are We Trying to Explain? // Journal of Democracy, vol. 20 no. 1, 2009
- Reading Russia: Tools of Autocracy // Journal of Democracy, vol. 20 no. 2, 2009
- Belarus – a country in transition? The State, elections, and opposition // Back from the cold? The EU and Belarus in 2009 / Chaillot Paper no. 119, 2009
- Belarus: Learning from Defeat // Journal of Democracy, vol. 17 no. 4, 2006
- Contagion Deterred: Preemptive Authoritarianism in the Former Soviet Union (the Case of Belarus) // Center on Democracy, Development, and the Rule of Law, Working Paper, 2006
- Still Soviet? Why Dictatorship Persists in Belarus // Harvard International Review, Vol. 29. no. 1, 2006
- Preempting Democracy: The Case of Belarus // Journal of Democracy, vol. 16 no. 4 2005
- The Quintessential Dissident // Journal of Democracy, vol. 16 no. 3 2005
- Color Blind in Belarus // Foreign Policy, 2005
- Is the Wave of Post-Soviet Electoral Revolutions Over? // Democracy at Large, September 2005
- The Deadlock of Brotherhood: Politics of Russia-Belarus Integration // Ab Imperio, no.3, 2002.
- Грамадскі сектар у Беларусі — паўсядзённае жыццё і арганізацыйныя працэсы(in Belarusian), 2009г., опубликовано в 2012г.,
- Балючае вяртанне ў рэальнасць(in Belarusian) // Наша Ніва – 2009.
- All Vitali's articles(in Belarusian) for ARCHE magazine.
- All Vitali's articles(in Russian) at “Our opinion” website.

=== Co-operation with mass media ===
Permanent author of the magazine ARCHE and Nasha Niva newspaper, portal “Our opinion”, Radio Free Europe/Radio Liberty expert, etc.

He also authored over 100 publications on the issues of democratization and authoritarianism in the former USSR, electoral revolutions and pre-emptive authoritarianism, politics of economic reforms, EU relations with Belarus, Belarus-Russia integration, etc.
