= Belsat =

Polish television channel aimed at Belarus

- Country: Poland
- Broadcast area: Belarus (main priority), Europe, Worldwide (via internet)
- Headquarters: Warsaw, Poland

Programming
- Languages: Belarusian; Ukrainian; Russian
- Picture format: 16:9 1080p60 (HDTV)

Ownership
- Owner: TVP International Media Centre
- Key people: Alina Koushyk; Siarhei Pelesa; Maria Górska (Slava); Jerzy Sałodki (Vot Tak/VT)

History
- Launched: 10 December 2007; 18 years ago
- Former names: Telewizja Białoruś

Links
- Website: www.belsat.eu t.me/belsat (Official Telegram-channel)

Availability

Terrestrial
- Telecentras: MUX LRTC2 and local MUX in South-East Lithuania (DVB-T)
- TVP: MUX6 (HEVC, DVB-T2)

Streaming media
- TVP VOD: https://vod.tvp.pl/na-zywo (Poland only)

Belsat (Belarusian: Белсат; Polish: Biełsat; stylised as B☰LSAT) is a Polish free-to-air terrestrial and satellite television channel aimed at Belarus. The channel is a subsidiary of TVP S.A. From the outset, it has been co-funded by the Polish Ministry of Foreign Affairs and international donors.

== Broadcasting platforms ==
=== Satellite and cable networks ===
Belsat broadcasts from the Hot Bird satellite, which covers the Europe and partly on MENA, Russia and Central Asia. In Poland, Ukraine and other countries is available on cable, IPTV or OTT-services. In Belarus, however, is unavailable on cable, IPTV or OTT-services due to a political ban by the authorities.

=== Internet ===
The channel's programming is broadcast live via the belsat.eu website, YouTube, and the BelsatSmart app for Smart TVs. Meanwhile, the БелсатТВ app for Android and iOS tablets and smartphones allows viewers to watch live, and read the latest news with embedded videos. Belsat also operates ten thematic YouTube channels: Belsat News, Belsat Life, Belsat Now, Belsat History, Belsat Music, Belsat Doc, The Way It Is, Hardcore Cartoons, Belsat in Polish and Belsat in English. It also hosts the Belsat Music channel on SoundCloud, featuring tracks from Belsat's music programmes.

== Audience ==
=== Television ===
According to sociological polls conducted for Belsat by Mia Research from April to May 2019 (with a sample of 1,515 people aged 18 to 64), Belsat is watched by 13% of adult Belarusians. The brand's recognisability rose from 27% to 40% between 2015 and 2019.

There have also been major changes in how the channel's output is watched. The traditional method, via satellite receivers, has been replaced by new technology. In May 2019, 85% of the Mia Research poll respondents declared that they watch the channel's programmes online, compared to only 18% via satellite dishes, 55% on computers and laptops, and 40% on smartphones. 8% of viewers were using Smart TV technology, even though the channel's app had only just been launched at time of polling.

=== Website ===
Compared to earlier years, there was a steep rise in the activity of Internet users on the channel's website, which has five language versions: Belarusian, Russian, Ukrainian, English and Polish. According to Google Analytics, the site garnered 1,290,042 unique visitors and 12,083,368 views in May 2019, putting it on a par with Western government-funded media in Belarus, such as Radio Svaboda, or independent media such as the Belarusian-language online newspaper Nasha Niva. The average number of daily users on the site was 68,153 during that period. From 1 to 25 August 2024 all websites was not available, but since 26 August 2024 websites are belongs to TVP.

=== Social media ===
Like the website, there are five language versions of all the channel's social media profiles on Facebook, Twitter, Instagram, TikTok, Telegram, Odnoklassniki, VKontakte and Linkedin. In April 2021, they had 775,000 subscribers in total. Belsat's ten thematic YouTube channels had a total of one million subscribers. Belsat News is the only Belarusian-language news channel on YouTube with more than 100,000 subscribers (in April 2019). The Russian-language The Way It Is, which targets viewers from the former USSR, passed the 100,000-subscriber mark in June 2019. Both channels won a Silver Button award from YouTube.

=== Audience profile ===
25% of Belsat's viewers were in favour of European integration in May 2019. The minority – 17% – opted for further integration with Russia. Over half named Belarusian citizenship as the most important factor for determining identity, and 20% – local patriotism. 85% of Belsat's audience had a positive attitude towards Poland, while 50% associated Poland with Europe, 25% with prosperity, 22% with democracy, and 55% with shopping.

== Airtime ==
From 3 March 2025 Belsat broadcasts programmes for 24 hours a day, begins at 8.00 a.m. (at 7:00 a.m. in summer) Minsk time (UTC +3). Online transmissions can also be watched via belsat.eu and YouTube. Previously, its daily broadcasting time was temporarily reduced occasionally, due to funding shortages.

== History ==
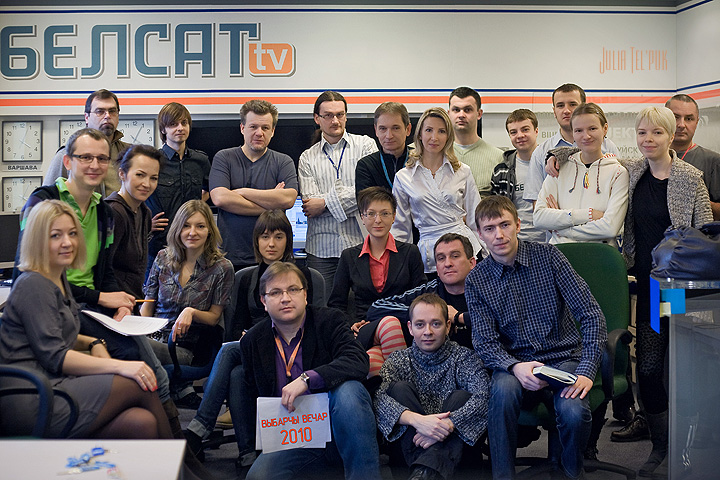
Belsat TV newsroom staff in 2010

=== Beginnings ===
The creation of a satellite channel as part of Telewizja Polska, aimed at viewers in Belarus, was the initiative of journalist Agnieszka Romaszewska-Guzy. It was designed in response to demand expressed in Belarusian democratic circles for a television channel independent of the Minsk authorities. The idea found support from the Polish government and a wide spectrum of political forces in parliament. As a result, the project became a priority area for Polish policy governing international cooperation to develop democracy and civil society. On 20 June 2006 Telewizja Polska's board formed a commission of media professionals from Poland and Belarus to draft plans for a Belarusian-language channel. Initially, the channel was due to be launched in January 2007. On 23 April 2007 Telewizja Polska and the Polish Ministry of Foreign Affairs signed an agreement to create a channel named TV Bialorus. Telewizja Polska's board formally approved the new channel as a subsidiary on 17 July 2007. TVP S.A. was allocated 16 million zlotys from public funds to set up the new channel, finally christened “Belsat”. Belsat began broadcasting on 10 December 2007 (International Human Rights Day) and since then its director has been Agnieszka Romaszewska-Guzy.

In 2008 Belsat received 20.9 million zloty ($8.5 million) of financial support from the Polish Ministry of Foreign Affairs, with reducing support in subsequent years. In 2012 the support level was 17.6 million zloty ($5.1 million). Additional support came from the governments of Sweden, Netherlands, Norway, and other countries.

=== Threat of closure ===
In August 2017, the Ministry of Foreign Affairs and its then-head Witold Waszczykowski reduced Belsat's subsidy and terminated the agreement to fund the channel. As a result, Jacek Kurski, the head of TVP, addressed the Ministry of Foreign Affairs, requesting confirmation of whether the government intended to continue funding the channel. Receiving no answer, he addressed the same question to premier Beata Szydlo. Members of the governmental coalition declared support for the channel, and the Ministry of Development became involved. In February 2018, the government pledged to finance the channel's activity from the ministry's reserve fund until the end of the year. It was also declared that, starting in 2019, the channel would be eligible for regular funding from the ministerial budget.

In March 2024, the Belsat management board was informed about the cut in financing from PLN 74 million in 2023 to PLN 40 million in 2024, which, according to Agnieszka Romaszewska, de facto meant the liquidation of the channel and the need to dismiss the team. A few days later, Romaszewska, the founder and director of Belsat, was dismissed from her position and dismissed from her job at TVP.

On 4 July 2024, the head of owners TVP World, Michał Broniatowski, said:

Belsat will not be liquidated. Instead, a new structure will be implemented. I want to emphasise that Belsat will not disappear. Instead, it will acquire new opportunities ... The changes will be unveiled on 1 March 2025. A new name will be revealed at the same time as the presentation of the new structure. The TVP will no longer be included in the name, but the word ‘Poland’ will be present. The search for a new name is already underway.

=== Imprisonment of journalists ===
In February 2021, two Belsat journalists, Katsyaryna Andreeva and Darya Chultsova, were sentenced to two years in prison by a court in Minsk after reporting from an anti-government rally held in November 2020. The arrest and subsequent sentencing was criticised by the European and International Federations of Journalists, as well as their Belarusian affiliate, the Belarusian Association of Journalists.

== Institutional cooperation ==
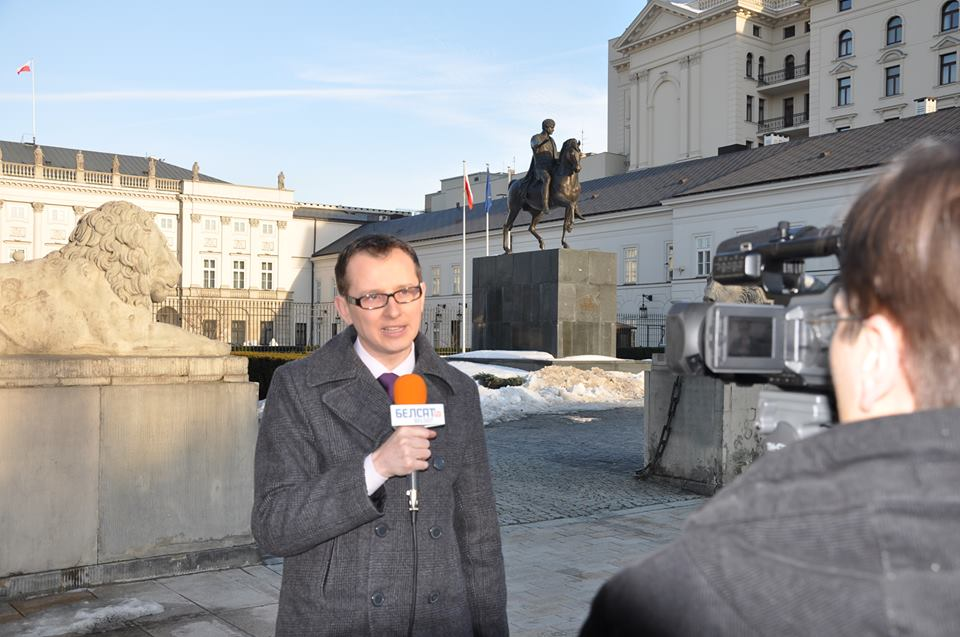
News reporter Siarhei Padsasonny speaking in front of the Presidential Palace in Warsaw.

Belsat TV is a subsidiary of TVP S.A., which co-finances it with the Ministry of Foreign Affairs and also provides production facilities. From the outset, the channel has been co-funded by a range of institutions, including the Swedish International Development Cooperation Agency (SIDA), the Nordic Council of Ministers, the foreign ministries of Norway, the Netherlands, Canada and Lithuania, the British and Irish governments, and the US State Department.

Media institutions such as Radio Free Europe/Radio Liberty (active on the Belarusian market as Radio Svaboda) and Deutsche Welle have licensed selected programmes to Belsat for free.

Belsat's current strategic institutional partners:

- The Royal Netherlands Embassy in Warsaw, which has sponsored training for Belsat employees and audience-measurement research;
- The British Broadcasting Corporation, which makes certain entertainment and educational series available free of charge, produces exclusive material for Belsat's Russian-language channel The Way It Is, and provides training for Belsat employees and management personnel;
- The European Endowment for Democracy, which funds several of Belsat's programmes;
- The National Democratic Institute for International Affairs (NDI), which co-funded the series of debates The Territory of Truth;
- The Organized Crime and Corruption Reporting Project, an association of investigative journalists which cooperates with the makers of the Let Us Handle It programme;
- Thomson Reuters, which has assisted in reorganising Belsat TV, offered training for channel employees, and co-funded The Territory of Truth and special editions of The World and Us.

As part of the Belaruskamouny ("Belarusian Speaker") social campaign to promote the Belarusian language, Belsat cooperates with organisations and institutions such as Art-Siadziba cultural centre, Belarusian PEN-Centre (a member of PEN International), and World Association of Belarusians "Backauščyna".

== Staff ==
In June 2008, the channel had around 100 employees in Poland and Belarus. The team currently numbers around 350 staff and contributors from Poland, Belarus, Ukraine, Russia, Kazakhstan and others. The channel has two registered branch offices in Minsk and Kyiv, as well as a network of correspondents in Berlin, Brussels, Vilnius, Prague and Yerevan.

== Reception ==
=== Belarus ===
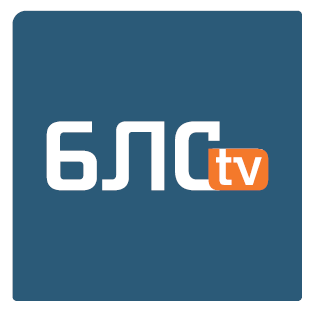
Belsat TV alternative logo used in the territory of Belarus

On 26 April 2007 Belarusian president Alexander Lukashenko dubbed the project "stupid and uncongenial". The Belarusian authorities' subsequent actions confirmed the political trend set by Lukashenko, resulting in four official refusals to register Belsat in Belarus. Since the channel has no accreditation, its journalists face constant persecution while working in the country. At the time, they had spent a total of 125 days in detention and been fined $94,296 US, simply for doing their jobs.

In 2017, the channel's Minsk office was searched and computer equipment was confiscated. The same year, Belsat TV was prohibited from using its trademark, following a Minsk court ruling that it infringed the rights of entrepreneur Andrey Belyakov, who had registered a firm named Belsat Plus. Since then, Belsat's reporters have used equipment bearing an alternative logo that contains consonants from the channel's name – the Cyrillic "BLS" (БЛС) and "tv".

The most recent search of Belsat's Minsk offices was carried out in 2019, in connection with a case in which the channel's journalists had allegedly slandered Andrei Shved, chairman of the State Forensic Examination Committee.

In 2020 Belsat journalists were 162 times detained; detentions regularly involve the confiscation of all equipment. 26 journalists arrested, out of which 6 journalists were convicted to arrests twice and 1 journalist – thrice, giving 34 cases of administrative arrests. They had been sentenced to a total of 392 days behind bars. 7 of arrested journalists were treated brutally and beaten by law enforcers. 7 journalist following detention were hospitalised. During the crackdown on the protests of 9–12 August, Belsat journalists were putting their lives on the line, and 2 of them were injured. Belsat journalists paid fines amounting to US$26,353.44.

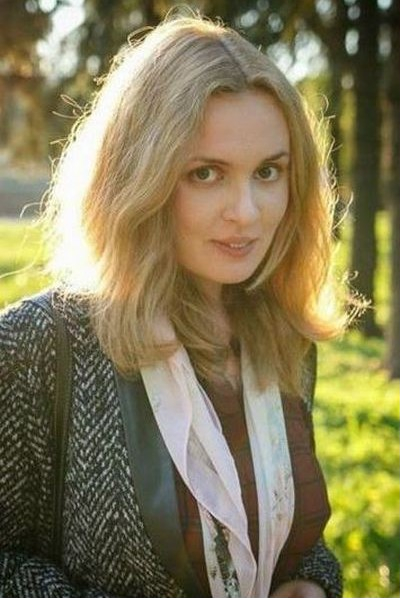
Belsat TV journalist Katsyaryna Andreeva was sentenced to 8 years in prison in 2022

On 18 February 2021 Belsat TV journalist Katsyaryna Andreeva and camerawoman Darya Chultsova were sentenced to two years of imprisonment in a minimum-security penal colony. They were accused of 'organisation and preparation of actions that grossly violate public order' (Art. 342 of the Criminal Code) on the back of their livestreaming a rally in Minsk. The investigators claim the Belsat crew 'coordinated protesters and called for further actions', but the two media workers were just performing their professional duties by reporting from the scene.

In July 2021, Belsat's content was declared extremist, meaning disseminating it can be punished by a 30-day detention. On 3 November 2021 the Ministry of Internal Affairs declared the channel an extremist group. Creation of an extremist group or participation in it is a criminal offence in Belarus.

In the fall of 2022, a criminal case for an interview with the channel was opened against Natalya Suslova, the mother of Belarusian volunteer Pavel "Volat" Suslov, who was killed in action in Ukraine. In January 2023, Daria Losik, the wife of Ihar Losik, was sentenced to two years in prison for an interview with the channel under a criminal article on promoting extremist activity.

=== Russia ===
In autumn 2024, Belsat was designated as an "undesirable organization" in Russia.

=== European Union and others ===
The European Parliament has urged the European Union to support Belsat in several resolutions. On 20 January 2011 the Parliament stressed the need to support Belarusian independent media, including Belsat TV. MEPs called on the European Commission "to support, with all financial and political means, the efforts of Belarusian civil society […] and non-governmental organisations in Belarus to promote democracy and oppose the regime". The resolution also called on the commission to halt ongoing cooperation and to withdraw its assistance provided to Belarusian state-owned media.

On 20 October 2004 US president George W. Bush signed into law the Belarus Democracy Act, which authorized sanctions against the Belarusian government and its leaders, while allowing for support of and financing to groups, NGOs, and individuals who supported and worked towards democratic and free press goals.

In January 2012, US president Barack Obama signed the Belarus Human Rights and Democracy Act, which amended the 2004 Act and outlined the main priorities for American foreign policy on Belarus, as well as support for independent media, including Belsat TV.

In April 2019, the OSCE condemned the search of Belsat's Minsk offices. In May 2019, Harlem Désir, the OSCE Representative on Freedom of the Media, expressed his disappointment and concern regarding the ongoing practice of imposing penalties on journalists working without accreditation in Belarus. This came in reaction to six Belsat journalists who had been sentenced to hefty fines.

On 31 July 2023, the European Parliament passed a resolution in which it asks the European Commission and the Member States, to strengthen Belarusian media outlets, including Belsat TV.

== Programmes ==
- Belarusian World (Belarusian: Беларускі свет): A programme presenting the lives of Belarusians resident abroad, focusing particularly on the Belarusian ethnic minority in Podlasie. Produced by Belsat TV's Białystok office.
- Belsat Music Live: A review of the most interesting bands on the contemporary Belarusian music scene. Popular presenters Mira Shulc and Siarhei Budkin talk to artists about their work and listen to songs live, together with the studio audience.
- By the River Nioman (Belarusian: Над Нёмнам): The channel's only Polish-language programme, broadcast with Belarusian subtitles. The presenters report on events in the life of the Polish minority in Belarus, visiting places linked to Polish history and culture. Produced by TVP Polonia.
- Dates of Truth (Belarusian: Даты праўды): A series of programmes by Viachaslau Rakicki on the centenary of Belarusian statehood, which began with the formation of the Belarusian People's Republic in 1918. Each episode contains previously unseen footage and photographs from private archives.
- Each of Us (Belarusian: Кожны з нас): Belsat's flagship talk show, hosted by well-known Belarusian social activist Hleb Labadzienka. In each episode, invited studio guests discuss a burning topical issue in Belarus.
- I'm Not Eating This (Russian: Я не буду это есть): Popular chefs Olga Prigarova and Alaksandr Chikileuski apply their professional skills to the full while helping Belarusian showbiz celebrity guests overcome their childhood culinary traumas.
- In Focus (Belarusian: Аб’ектыў): Belsat's flagship live news programme has been on the air every day since the channel was launched, presenting current affairs, mostly from Belarus and Central and Eastern Europe.
- Intermarium: Pavel Mazhejka's programme invites historians and writers to discuss painful chapters of the shared history of Central and Eastern European countries, and ponder their impact on international relations today.
- Interview (Belarusian: Размова): A show that goes out every evening from Monday to Friday, presented by well-known political commentators Svetlana Kalinkina, Uladzimir Mackievich and Vital Cyhankou, who discuss the most crucial events taking place in Belarus with their guests.
- Labyrinths (Belarusian: Лабірынты): A series of history programmes in mockumentary style. Each episode unearths little-known episodes from the lives of prominent Belarusian writers and intellectuals who lived in the first half of the 20th century.
- Language Learned Anew (Belarusian: Мова Нанова): A televised version of the well-liked courses to popularise the Belarusian language among people who normally speak Russian in Belarus. Each episode presents vocabulary on a specific topic, and is presented by Alesia Litvinouska and Hleb Labadzienka.
- Let Us Handle It (Belarusian: Давайце разбірацца): Programme of Stanislau Ivashkievich's Belarusian Investigative Center on corruption in Belarus is produced in conjunction with the International Consortium of Investigative Journalists, which exposed the Panama Papers scandal.
- Ministry of Truth (Belarusian: Эксперт. Міністэрства праўды): A satirical animated series by Yuriy Khashchevatskiy, lampooning the internal workings of the Belarusian state and the way Alexander Lukashenko's administration deals with neighbouring countries.
- Mysteries of Belarusian History (Belarusian: Загадкі беларускай гісторыі): Writer and presenter Alaksandr Kraucevich is a historian who popularises Belarusian history for our viewers, travelling around the country and describing little-known events which are often intentionally left out of the Belarusian school curriculum.
- Rambling in and around Hrodna (Belarusian: Вандроўкі па Гарадзеншчыне): Together with presenter Alaksiej Shota, the audience can visit little-known historical sites in the Hrodna region: former estates of the local aristocracy and nobility, Catholic and Orthodox churches, and remnants of Jewish culture.
- So Be It TV (Belarusian: Хай так TV): A satirical show set in a fictional underground television channel. The three presenters comment on current events, and invite famous Belarusians into the studio to discuss unusual topics.
- Studio Belsat (Belarusian: Студыя Белсат): A live news bulletin that goes out from Monday to Friday. Regular segments include headline news, weather, sports news, a Belarusian media roundup, plus presentations of cultural events and state-of-the-art technology.
- The Evening Stiletto (Belarusian: Вечаровы шпіль): A satirical roundup of the week's events in Community of Independent States member-countries. Presenter Ales Karnienka selects the funniest, most ridiculous stories and provides his own merciless commentaries.
- The Territory of Truth (Russian: Территория правды): Two series of international debates involving experts. In 2018, the first one covered the Russian presidential elections, while in 2019 the second focused on the twentieth anniversary of NATO’s expansion to include Central and Eastern European countries.
- The Way It Is (Russian: Вот так): A daily live news show in Russian, aimed at residents of the post-Soviet region. The programme has a network of correspondents in Russia, Ukraine, Kazakhstan and Armenia.
- The World and Us (Belarusian: ПраСвет): An analytical programme edited by Alina Koushyk and Siarhiej Pialiasa. Filmed editorials zoom in on the week’s major world events, while experts in the studio discuss them from the viewpoint of Belarus and its people.
- Welcome to Belarus (Belarusian: Welcome ў Беларусь): Broadcast during the summer months, this programme is about foreigners who, finding themselves in Belarus for a variety of reasons, discover the country and contrast what they knew about it before with their real-life experiences.
- Witnesses (Belarusian: Сведкі): A documentary series by Viachaslau Rakicki on the struggle for Belarusian independence during the 1980s, 1990s and 2000s. Social and political activists describe historic events in which they took part.

== Awards ==
The work of the Belsat team and management has been regularly acknowledged by NGOs, media and journalists’ associations. Agnieszka Romaszewska-Guzy and her staff were awarded Rzeczpospolita’s Jerzy Giedroyc prize for promoting good relations with neighbouring countries. She was also named Manager of the Year by business magazine Home & Market, as well as European of the Year 2013 by the European edition of international monthly Reader's Digest, whose winners have acted to improve the lives of others.

In March 2021, the Center for Belarusian Solidarity awarded Belsat TV the Global Belarusian Solidarity Award in the category "Without Borders".

A full list of awards won by Belsat TV programmes.
