= Square of Changes =

Courtyard in Minsk, Belarus

The Square of Changes (also, Peremen Square; Belarusian: Плошча Перамен; other informal names: "Peremen Square", "Courtyard of Change," and "DJ Area of Change") is the name of a popular courtyard in Minsk, Belarus, located at the intersection of Chervyakov, Kakhovskaya, and Smorgovsky streets. It appeared spontaneously in August 2020 during the protests after the sixth presidential election in Belarus. On the wall of a ventilation booth, unknown people painted a mural of two sound engineers from the Minsk State Palace of Children and Youth (Kirill Galanov and Vladislav Sokolovsky), who played Viktor Tsoi's song "Khochu Peremen" at the official pro-Lukashenko event on August 6, 2020 in Kiev Square, Minsk.

Since mid-August 2020, the mural depicting the sound engineers has been removed many times by public officials but re-created by local residents every time it was vandalized. The locals regularly invite musicians to their evening concerts, conduct self-educating lectures, and decorate the space with national symbols.

== Murder of Raman Bandarenka ==
On November 11, 2020, unknown people in masks (during protests, Belarusian OMON often wears civilian clothing as a disguise to attack and kidnap citizens) came to remove the white-red-white ribbons symbolizing the opposition flag. Raman Bandarenka, a 31-year-old Minsk resident, a manager and an art-designer, made a remark during a dispute with them. According to eyewitnesses, one of them was aggressive toward Bandarenka and pushed him so hard that he fell and hit his head on a children's slide. Two other unknown individuals continued beating Bandarenka, then carried him by the arms and legs into a minibus and left. After some time, an ambulance was called to the Central District Department of Internal Affairs. The medical team found Bandarenka unconscious. That night, the mural was desecrated again.

Bandarenka was admitted to the intensive care unit of the Minsk BHMP (Ambulance Hospital) on November 12, 2020, at 00:05. He was diagnosed with a severe closed traumatic brain injury, acute subdural hematomas of the head, cerebral hemorrhage, and multiple soft tissue injuries. He was in a coma and underwent a surgery, but medics were unable to save Bandarenka due to his serious condition. Bandarenka died the evening of November 12, 2020.

After the news of Bandarenka's death, people began to get together spontaneously on Peremen Square to lay flowers and light candles. Several thousand people gathered in the square, chanting "Let's not forget, let's not forgive," "We will stop this fascism".

On November 16, 2020 the Ministry of Foreign Affairs of Latvia imposed a travel ban against the kickboxer Dmitry Shakuta and the president of the Belarusian Ice Hockey Association Dzmitry Baskau ‘for an unspecified period’ because of their alleged involvement in the killing of Raman Bandarenka. A number of sportspeople have previously identified them in photos and videos of the masked persons who attacked Bandarenka. Baskau and Shakuta did not comment on the suspicions. In the same month Estonia also imposed a travel ban against Shakuta and Baskau. In January 2021 the International Ice Hockey Federation declared that it opened an independent investigation concerning the involvement of Dzmitry Baskau in this incident.
