= Belarusian Ice Hockey Association =

Ice hockey governing body of Belarus

Belarus
- Association name: Belarusian Ice Hockey Association
- IIHF Code: BLR
- IIHF membership: 6 May 1992
- President: Dzmitry Baskau
- IIHF men's ranking: 9
- IIHF women's ranking: N/A

The Belarusian Ice Hockey Association (Belarusian: Федэрацыя хакея Рэспублікі Беларусь, Russian: Федерация хоккея Республики Беларусь) is the governing body of ice hockey in Belarus. It was founded on 6 March 1992 and became a member of the IIHF on 2 May 1992.

The Belarusian Ice Hockey Association hosted the 2014 IIHF World Championship, and was planned to co-host the 2021 IIHF World Championship. Because of "safety and security issues," the International Ice Hockey Federation decided that the 2021 World Championship would not be played in Belarus.

Since 9 September 2020, the Belarusian Ice Hockey Association has been headed by Dzmitry Baskau who is accused of being involved in the killing of protester Raman Bandarenka. For this reason, a travel ban against Baskau was imposed by the governments of Latvia and Estonia. On September 8, 2021, the International Ice Hockey Federation disqualified him for five years. For ten months, the International Ice Hockey Federation investigated his actions and found that Baskau used discrimination and threats against sportspersons because of their political views.

Due to the 2022 Russian invasion of Ukraine, the International Ice Hockey Federation banned all Belarusian national and club teams from its events indefinitely, and Hockey Canada banned Belarus’s “participation in events held in Canada that do not fall under the IIHF’s jurisdiction.”
