= Dzmitry Baskau =

Belarusian politician, businessman, and former ice hockey play

Dzmitry Baskau (Belarusian: Дзмітрый Юр’евіч Баскаў, Russian: Дмитрий Юрьевич Басков; born 25 August 1978 in Minsk, Byelorussian Soviet Socialist Republic) is a Belarusian former ice hockey player and businessman. He served as chairman of the Belarusian Ice Hockey Association from 2020 to 2021. He has led the ice hockey team of Alexander Lukashenko and was the head of HC Dinamo Minsk between 2018 and 2020. On 14 September 2021, he was appointed to the Council of the Republic.

== Life ==
Until 2002 Baskau studied law at Belarusian State University. Then he got learning on an ice hockey coach done in the Institute of Advanced Training and Retraining of Belarusian State University of Physical Culture. He got a diploma from the IPM Business School in 2018.

He was put in the news for the time of the 2020 Belarusian protests. According to mass media Baskau was among the persons who beat activist Raman Bandarenka in Minsk. After that, Raman Bandarenka died on November 12, 2020, in the hospital. On November 16, 2020, Latvia imposed a travel ban against Baskau and Dmitry Shakuta who is also accused of participating in the attack against Bandarenka. Lithuania and Estonia made the same on November 20, 2020. The International Ice Hockey Federation opened a private inquiry (an act of asking for information) on the Raman Bandarenka matter. The International Olympic Committee banned Baskau of taking part in its events.

In the spring of 2021, he had assets of at least several million US dollars (parts of companies, real property, vehicles). Part of the assets was listed as his wife's.

On September 8, 2021, the International Ice Hockey Federation disqualified him for five years. For ten months, the International Ice Hockey Federation investigated his actions and found that Baskau used discrimination and threats against sportspersons because of their political views. On September 10, Baskau resigned from the post of chairman of the Belarusian Ice Hockey Association.

On September 14, 2021, Alexander Lukashenko appointed Baskau a member of the Council of the Republic of the National Assembly of Belarus. Lukashenko noted that Dmitry Baskau will deal with social issues, as well as sports topics in the upper house of parliament.

On December 2, 2021, Dzmitry Baskau was added to the Specially Designated Nationals and Blocked Persons List by the United States Department of the Treasury.

A BYPOL investigation has uncovered that Dzmitry Baskau had gifted a 1949 GAZ 20 worth more than 50,000 US dollars to Lukashenko.

== Personal life ==
Dzmitry Baskau got married with Aliaksandra Baskava (Shyshko). She is a daughter of the chief of Brestenergo and the member of the Council of the Republic (Belarus) Uladzimir Shyshko.
