= Belarusian Helsinki Committee =

Belarusian non-governmental human rights organization

The Belarusian Helsinki Committee (BHC; Belarusian: РПГА «Беларускі Хельсінкскі Камітэт» (БХК)) is a non-governmental human rights organization established in 1995 and in 2007 was the sole remaining independent human rights group in Belarus, apart from Viasna Human Rights Centre. Its goal is protection of human rights in Belarus in accordance with the Helsinki Accords.

The government fined the organization $73,000 for allegedly unpaid taxes on money received via European Union Tacis Programme grants (2003, overruled by the Supreme Court in 2004) and brought criminal proceedings against officials of the organization, including its chairman Taciana Proćka.

In 2021 BHC became one of the victims of Alexander Lukashenko's nationwide repressions against independent media and human rights organizations in the wake of the Belarusian protests. Its office was raided several times, then sealed by the police. The Justice Ministry requested documents, that were kept in the inaccessible office, and issued a warrant on the same day as the request. Two warrants in a year allow the Ministry to initiate liquidation process.

On 1 October 2021, the Belarusian Helsinki Committee was forcibly liquidated by the Supreme Court. The court used materials of some unspecified criminal case (probably with no verdict passed so far) to dissolute the BHC. BHC was the penultimate registered human rights group in Belarus (the last one is Pravovaya iniciativa — The Legal Initiative, which is under of liquidation too).

In July 2022, the Belarusian Helsinki Committee received consultative status with the UN ECOSOC, becoming the first Belarusian NGO with such status.

In 2026, the Belarusian KGB designated the Belarusian Helsinki Committee as an extremist group.

== See also ==
- Viasna Human Rights Centre
- Helsinki Committee for Human Rights

== Literature ==
- Silitski, Vitali; Zaprudnik, Jan (2010). The A to Z of Belarus (The A to Z Guide Series). Lanham: Scarecrow Press. p. 41. ISBN 978-0-8108-7200-4.
