= Lenin Garden, Ufa =

Park in Ufa, Russia

Lenin Gardens
- Ленин баҡсаһы
- Interactive map of Lenin Gardens
- Type: Urban park
- Coordinates: 54°43′05″N 55°56′35″E
- Area: 8 hectares (20 acres)
- Created: 1867
- Status: Open all year

Lenin Gardens (Bashkir: Ленин баҡсаһы, Lenin baqsahy) was one of the first urban public parks in Ufa, Russia. The park is located in the city center, near the Belaya river and facing Governor's House, currently the home of the Ministry of Health of the Republic of Bashkortostan; Republic House, the Bashkortostan seat of government; and the Bashkir Academic Drama Theater Mazhit Gafuri. In May 2022, the city began consideration of restoring the park's original name, Ushakovsky Park.

== History ==
The park was formally established on 20 August [O.S. 7 August] 1871 by decree of Tsar Alexander II. It was named in honor of Ufa Governate governor Sergei Pavlovich Ushakov. The governor's residence overlooked a livestock pasture and in 1867 Ushakov ordered that a park be laid out on the site instead. Initially, the park was open only to local nobility; a sign at the gate barred "lower ranks and dogs" from entering.

Over the years, the park's name has changed several times.

1867–1917 Ushakovsky Park (Bashkir: Ушаковский паркы)

- The governor of the Ufa Governorate, Nilolay Bogdanovich, was assassinated in Ushakovsky Park on 19 May [O.S. 6 May] 1903 by SR Combat Organization operative Egor Dulebov in retaliation for authorizing soldiers to shoot striking workers in Zlatoust in March 1903.

1917–1945 Garden of Freedom (Азатлыҡ паркы)

- The park added a cemetery and memorial for those who died during the Russian Revolution and subsequent Russian Civil War. A memorial at the burial site shows only the names of Shagit Hudayberdin and A.M. Cheverev.
- In 1934, Tatar and Bashkir poet and folklorist Majit Gafuri was buried here.

1945–1980 Alexander Matrosov Central Park of Culture and Recreation (А. М. Матросов исемендәге Үҙәк Мәҙәниәт һәм ял паркы)

- In 1951, a monument honoring Soviet war hero Alexander Matrosov was erected in the park, which had been renamed in his honor. The statute was relocated in 1981 when the park was renovated, but returned in 1989.

1980–now V.I. Lenin Gardens (В.И. Ленин исемендәге парк)
