= Majit Gafuri =

Bashkir poet (1880–1934)

- Мәжит Ғафури
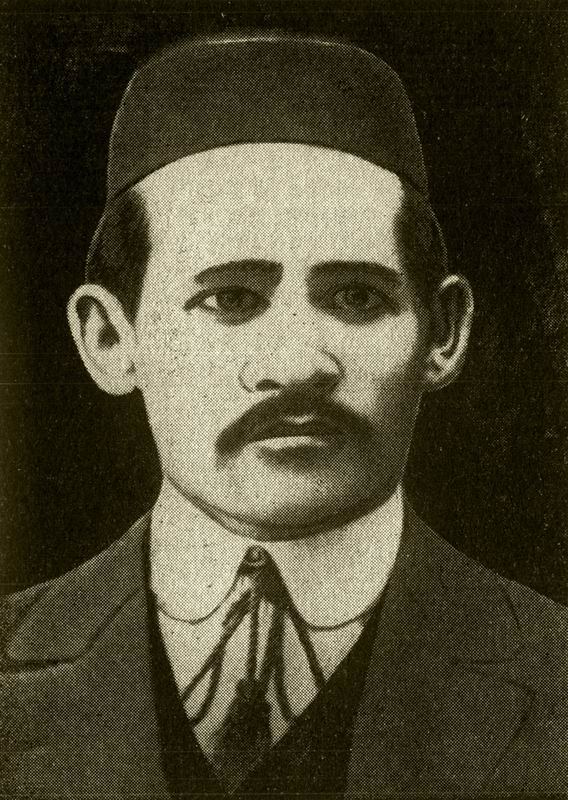
- Majit Gafuri (c. 1911)
- Born: Ғәбделмәжит Нурғәни улы Ғафуров; Ğəbdilməjit Nurğəniy olı Ğafurov; 20 July [O.S. 8 July] 1880; Zilim-Karanovo, Ufa Governorate, Russian Empire
- Died: October 28, 1934 (aged 54); Ufa, Bashkir ASSR, USSR
- Resting place: Lenin Garden, Ufa, Bashkortostan, Russia
- Occupations: Poet; Playwright; Journalist
- Spouse: Zührə Nasırova
- Writing career
- Language: Old Bashkir, Bashkir
- Notable awards: People's Poet of the Bashkir ASSR (1923)

Majit Gafuri (Bashkir: Мәжит Ғафури, romanized: Məjit Ğafuriy, Yañalif script: Məƶit Ƣafuri; Tatar: Мәҗит Гафури, Mäcit Ğafuri; Russian: Мажи́т Гафу́ри; 20 July [O.S. 8 July] 1880 – 28 October 1934) was a Bashkir and Tatar poet, writer, and playwright. He was one of the leaders of the democratic trend in Tatar literature and one of the founders of national children's literature.

== Biography ==
Gufari was born to a Tatar-speaking teacher family, in the village of Zilim-Karanovo (now Gafuriysky District, Bashkortostan). At an early age, he showed an aptitude for teaching and in 1893 his father arranged for him to study at a madrasa in a neighboring village. In 1898, he entered the Räsüliä madrasa in Troitsk, where he studied until 1905. During his spare time, Gafuri worked in Zakir Ramiev's gold mines and taught Kazakh children on the steppe. In 1905, he studied at the famous Kazan Möxämmädiä madrasa and then, in 1906, at the Ğäliä madrasa in Ufa. He remained in Ufa after finishing his studies in 1908.

He wrote his first poem in Tatar, "Шакирдам ишана" (Şaqirdam işana, I am a Student), in 1902, which was followed in 1904 by his first book, Сибирская железная дорога, или положение нации (Sibirsqaya jeleznaya doroğa, ili polojeniye natsii, The Siberian Railway, or the State of the Nation), was published in Orenburg.

Following the First Russian Revolution in 1905, questions of social classes, national identity, and resistance to oppression began to rise in his work. He also was engaged in studying folklore and traditions; in 1910, he published a translation of the Bashkir epic Zayatulak and Hyuhylu (Заятүләк менән Һыуhылыу). After the death of Ğabdulla Tuqay in 1913, Gafuri took up the mantel of a leading democratic voice in Tatar literature.

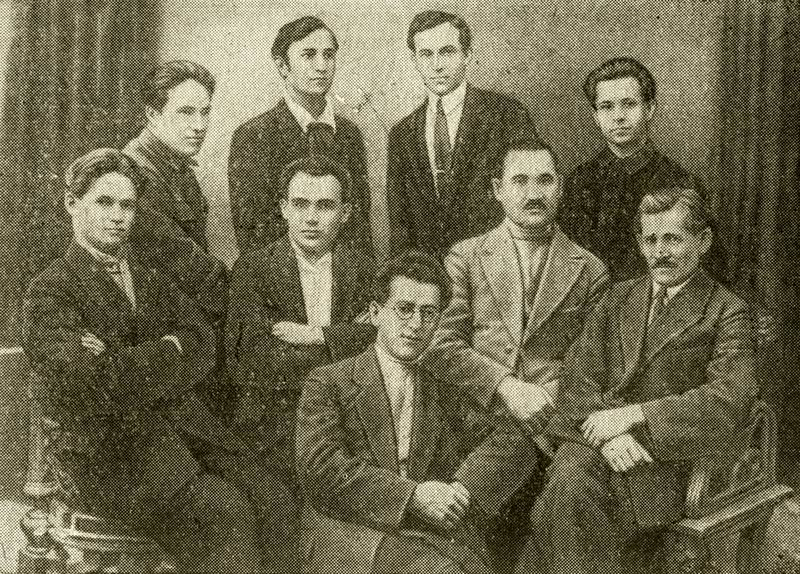
Majit Gafuri with journalists from Ufa, 1926

1917 Russian Revolution, Gafuri wrote poetry and plays celebrating workers and the struggle against tsardom during the Russian Civil War. He also worked to organize local newspapers for Bashkortostan. He also published two semi-autobiographical works, Кара йөзләр (Qara yözlär, Black-Faced) (1927), which was later produced as a play, and Шагыйрьнең алтын приискысында (Şağıyr’neñ altın priisqısında, In the Poet's Gold Mines) (1931). He also wrote fables for children based upon Kazakh folklore.

A. I. Kharisov in his monograph The Literary Heritage of the Bashkir People (Литературное наследие башкирского народа) noted "... Gafuri is a monolingual writer: He wrote in the Tatar language, but at the same time he served two peoples — the Tatars and the Bashkirs."

== Personal life ==
Gafuri married Zöhrä Nasıyrova (Зөһрә Насыйрова, 1892–1938), the daughter of tailors from Kilem, Buzdyaksky District. They had two sons.

== Legacy ==
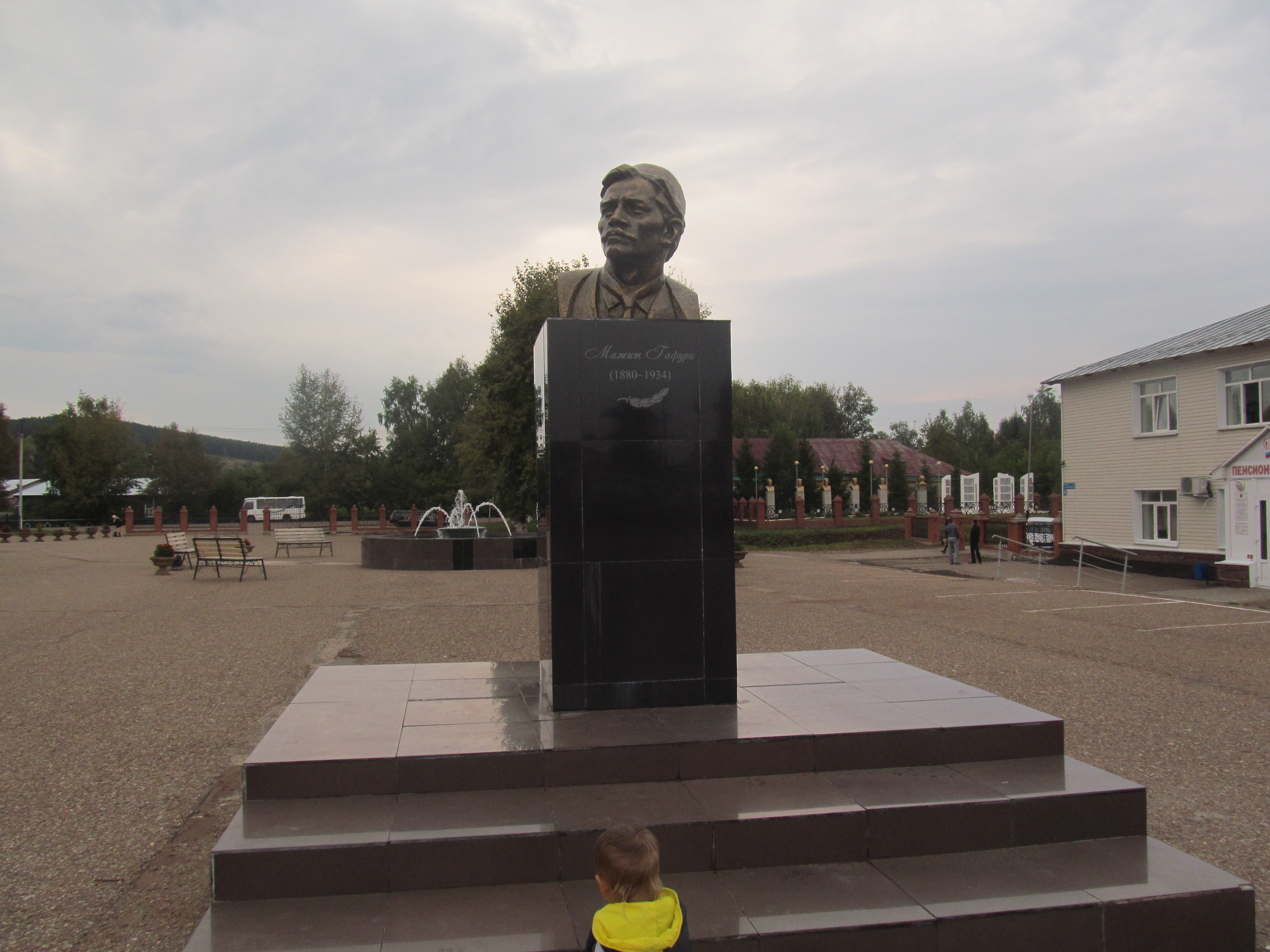
Monument to Majit Gafuri in Krasnousolsk

In 1940, the Krasnousolsky District of the Bashkir ASSR was renamed Gafuriysky District in Gafuri's honor. In 1948, the Mazhit Gafuri Memorial House-Museum opened in the house in Ufa where Gafuri lived from 1924 to 1934. It was one of the first literary museums in Bashkortostan. In 1961, Majit Gafuri Park of Culture and Leisure was established in the Oktyabrsky district of Ufa. In 1971, the Bashkir Academic Drama Theater was renamed in Gafuri's honor and a monument to him was added in 1978. Across Russia, some 200 streets bear Gafuri's name.
