= Andrey Zdravomyslov =

Russian sociologist

Andrey Grigoryevich Zdravomyslov (1928 – 2008) was a prominent Russian sociologist and philosopher. A prominent figure in the mid-20th-century Soviet and post-Soviet Russian sociology, he was instrumental in introducing quantitative and statistical research methodology along with the Western sociological frameworks to the USSR by working on relativistic theory of nationhood.

== Early life ==
Zdravomyslov was born in Leningrad, USSR. He pursued higher education at Leningrad State University. In 1953 he graduated in philosophy, earning his candidature of sciences degree in philosophy in 1960 and subsequently completed his doctor of sciences dissertation in 1969, examining the concept of human interest as a driver of social activity, establishing a core theoretical focus that would inform his work throughout his career.

== Career ==
In the early 1960s, Zdravomyslov along with V. P. Rozhin and Vladimir Yadov came up together to lead pioneering empirical studies on worker motivation and job satisfaction among Soviet industrial personnel. This work culminated in the book ‘’Man and His Work’’, published in Russian in 1967 and translated into English in 1970. The publication earned applause from their peers. The uncensored edition incorporating a comparative analysis of American and Soviet industrial workers, alongside new material detailing work attitude shifts in post-Soviet Russia was published in 2003, as the first edition was prohibited in Soviet era.

Zdravomyslov formulated a relativistic theory of nationhood, asserting that every nation, defined by its distinct features and collective identity, constitutes an essential element of modern global society. In advancing this relativistic framework, he endorsed a multipolar worldview, highlighting both the growing complexity and the imperative for deep analytical reflection regarding the constantly evolving and contentious landscape of national interests and social relations.

Zdravomyslov's works were renowned among Soviet students, serving as a foundational text throughout the 1960s and 1970s. His later scholarship expanded across several key domains, including the sociology of power, interethnic conflict, and national identity. He argued that social conflict is an inherent, non-destructive element of public life requiring specialized management tools rather than ideological suppression.

Additionally, he developed a relational framework of nationhood, contending that distinct national consciousnesses form essential components of global society. Throughout his career, Zdravomyslov sought to bridge Soviet social science with international scholarship by championing Russian translations of prominent American theorists like Talcott Parsons and Robert K. Merton, while maintaining active personal correspondence with leading Western sociologists, including Talcott Parsons, Piotr Sztompka, Randall Collins, and Robert Merton.

Zdravomyslov held positions within Communist Party academic institutions, serving as Chair of Philosophy at the Leningrad Higher Party School and as a senior scholar at the Institute of Marxism-Leninism in Moscow, where he sought to separate empirical inquiry from political doctrine. Following the dissolution of the Soviet Union, he led the Centre for Sociological Analysis of Conflicts at the Russian Independent Institute of Social and National Problems from 1991 to 2003, focusing heavily on post-Soviet interethnic tensions.

Later in his career, he served as a Senior Research Fellow at the Institute of Sociology of the Russian Academy of Sciences in Moscow. He actively participated in international academic governance, serving on the board of the International Sociological Association's Research Committee on Sociological Theory. Within Russia, he co-founded the Society of Professional Sociologists and presided over the organization from 1992 to 2002.

== Reception ==
Zdravomyslov's major publications received significant commentary from international and Russian scholars. Harold L. Sheppard evaluated the English release of Man and His Work: A Sociological Study, observing that Zdravomyslov and his co-authors advanced research on job satisfaction in socialist nations by combining empirical survey data with Marxist theory rather than relying solely on political rhetoric. Sheppard noted that the research team analyzed concrete statistical connections across variables such as job content, pay, workplace structure, and personal traits.

Sheppard also highlighted methodological parallels with Western research, pointing out that the survey items devised by Zdravomyslov and his colleagues mirrored Frederick Herzberg's framework on workplace satisfaction factors, an overlap resulting from direct collaboration between Herzberg and the Soviet team. Ultimately, Sheppard commended the authors for maintaining rigorous statistical standards to examine modern labor dynamics beyond basic Marxist premises.

Reviewing Zdravomyslov's monograph Sociology: Theory, History and Practice, Oleg Yanitsky noted that the work frames society's core internal need as self knowledge and defines modern sociology as a developed communication network. Divided into five sections, the book examines international versus national sociological traditions, tracing European and American developments while arguing that Russian sociology originated locally through 19th century discussions of social realities rather than foreign importation.

Yanitsky observed that Zdravomyslov's theoretical methodology matched that of international peers with whom he collaborated. The monograph explores the Second World War as a pivotal cultural event marked by shared trauma and fragmented national memories in both Russia and Germany, while outlining a relativistic theory of nations that favors a multipolar world model. Yanitsky emphasized that Zdravomyslov's broader career consistently addressed complex social contradictions and post Soviet transformations directly, utilizing conflict analysis to evaluate Russian history.

== Legacy ==
Over a career spanning five decades, Zdravomyslov authored or co-authored over 300 academic publications. For his contributions to the discipline, he was awarded the Medal of the Order (II Class) as well as the Pitirim Sorokin Gold Medal. His scholarly legacy continues through his extensive bibliography and his daughter, Elena Zdravomyslova, who is a recognized sociologist specializing in gender studies in Russia.

== Works ==
=== Books ===
- Zdravomyslov, A.G; Yadov, V; Rozhin, V (1967). Man and His Work: A Sociological Study. International Arts and Science Press, New York.
- Zdravomyslov, A.G. (1986). Developments in Marxist Sociological Theory: Modern Social Problems and Theory. London: SAGE.
- Zdravomyslov, A.G. (2008). Sociology: Theory, History, Practice (in Russian). Nauka, Moscow.

=== Journals ===
- Beliaev, E. V.; Vodzinskaia, V. V.; Zdravomyslov, A. G.; Ornatskii, B. V.; Shaev, A. S.; Iadov, V. A. (1962-07-01). "Workers' Time-Budget Research: A Method of Concrete Sociological Investigation". Soviet Sociology. 1 (1). Routledge: 44–57. doi:10.2753/SOR1061-0154010144. ISSN 0038-5824.
- Zdravomyslov, A. G.; Iadov, V. A. (1964-04-01). "On Programming a Concrete Social Investigation". Soviet Sociology. 2 (4). Routledge: 21–29. doi:10.2753/SOR1061-0154020421. ISSN 0038-5824.
- Zdravomyslov, A. G.; Iadov, V. A. (1965-04-01). "An Attempt at a Concrete Study of Attitude Toward Work". Soviet Sociology. 3 (4). Routledge: 3–14. doi:10.2753/SOR1061-015403043. ISSN 0038-5824.
- Zdravomyslov, A. G. (1988-12-01). "The New Sociopolitical Thinking and the Problem of the "Technological Challenge"". Soviet Sociology. 27 (3). Routledge: 28–52. doi:10.2753/SOR1061-0154270328. ISSN 0038-5824.
- Zdravomyslov, A. G. (1990-07-01). "A New Vision of Socialism and the Process of Politization of Mass Consciousness". Soviet Sociology. 29 (4). Routledge: 53–67. doi:10.2753/SOR1061-0154290453. ISSN 0038-5824.
- Zdravomyslov, A. G. (1991-06-01). "Changes in mass consciousness and outlines of parliamentary activity". Journal of Communist Studies. 7 (2). Routledge: 235–256. doi:10.1080/13523279108415086. ISSN 0268-4535.
- Zdravomyslov, A. G. (1991-11-01). "The Principle of Rationality in Contemporary Sociological Theory: Epistemological and Culturological Foundations". Soviet Sociology. 30 (6). Routledge: 6–20. doi:10.2753/SOR1061-015430066. ISSN 0038-5824.
- Zdravomyslov, A. G. (1994-05-01). "Fundamental Problems of the Sociology of Conflict and the Dynamics of Mass Consciousness". Sociological Research. 33 (3). Routledge: 54–67. doi:10.2753/SOR1061-0154330354. ISSN 1061-0154.
- Zdravomyslov, A. G. (1995-05-01). "National-Ethnic Conflicts and the Formation of a Russian State". Russian Politics & Law. 33 (3). Routledge: 8–33. doi:10.2753/RUP1061-194033038. ISSN 1061-1940.
- Zdravomyslov, Andrei G. (1995-11-01). "Sociology in Russia". Russian Social Science Review. 36 (6). Routledge: 33–52. doi:10.2753/RSS1061-1428360633. ISSN 1061-1428.

=== Reviews ===
- Zdravomyslov, Andrei (2006-05-01). "Sovremennoe rossiiskoe obshestvo. Sotsialnii mechanism transformatsii [Russian Society Today: Social Mechanisms of Transformation]". International Sociology. 21 (3). SAGE Publications Ltd: 447–451. doi:10.1177/026858090602100323. ISSN 0268-5809.
- Zdravomyslov, Andrei (2007-09-01). "Review: Aspects of Power: Markku Kivinen, Progress and Chaos: Russia as a Challenge for the Sociological Imagination. Helsinki: Kikimora Publications, 2002, 271 pp. [Russian translation, M. Chernish: Progres i Khaos: sotsiologicheskii analiz proshlogo I budushego Rossii, St Petersburg: Akademicheskii proiekt, 2001], ISBN 9514596366". International Sociology. 22 (5). SAGE Publications Ltd: 624–628. doi:10.1177/0268580907080496. ISSN 0268-5809.

== Sources ==
- Titarenko, Larissa (2025), "Zdravomyslov, Andrey (1928–2009)", The Blackwell Encyclopedia of Sociology, John Wiley & Sons, Ltd, pp. 1–2, doi:10.1002/9781405165518.wbeos1533.pub2, ISBN 978-1-4051-6551-8
- Yanitsky, Oleg (2009-09-01). "Reviews: Theorizing in and About Russia: A. G. Zdravomyslov, Sotsiologiya: teoriya, istoriya, praktika [Sociology: Theory, History and Practice]. Moscow: Nauka Publishers/Institute of Sociology, Russian Academy of Sciences, 2008, 382 pp., ISBN 90785020354074, 800 rubles/US$25.50". International Sociology. 24 (5). SAGE Publications Ltd: 682–684. doi:10.1177/0268580909341110. ISSN 0268-5809.
- Sheppard, Harold L. (1972-04-01). "Book Review: Organizational Behavior: Man and His Work: A Sociological Study". ILR Review. 25 (3). SAGE Publications Inc: 450–451. doi:10.1177/001979397202500319. ISSN 0019-7939.
