= Alexander Strizhakov =

Russian scientist (1937–2025)

- Александр Стрижаков
- Born: Alexander Nikolaevich Strizhakov; 12 February 1937; Kuybyshev, Russian SFSR, USSR
- Died: 26 September 2025 (aged 88)
- Education: Samara State Medical University
- Occupation: Scientist

Alexander Nikolaevich Strizhakov (Russian: Александр Николаевич Стрижаков; 12 February 1937 – 26 September 2025) was a Russian scientist. A member of the Russian Academy of Sciences, he was a recipient of the Medal of the Order for Merit to the Fatherland (1998).

Strizhakov died on 26 September 2025, at the age of 88.
