= Irik Zhdanov =

Russian boxing coach (1934–2022)

- Ирик Жданов
- Born: Irik Gatiyatulovich Zhdanov; 20 October 1934
- Died: 7 August 2022 (aged 87); Orenburg, Russia
- Occupation: Boxing coach

Irik Gatiyatulovich Zhdanov (Russian: Ирик Гатиятулович Жданов; 20 October 1934 – 7 August 2022) was a Russian boxing coach.

== Biography ==
Zhdanov began to box at the age of fourteen. He became a member of the Dynamo Sports Club in 1948. Zhdanov served in the Soviet Army at the age of eighteen, where he later worked as a coach. He enlisted males at the Zaural Grove, later conducted coaching in Lenin Garden, Ufa. When he coached them, they won and Zhdanov had received an invitation to begin work at a sports school.

Zhdanov had previously boxed while serving in the army, but had suffered from a head injury. He decided to coach after the injury. Zhdanov attended the Omsk Institute of Physical Culture, later graduating in 1959. He moved to Orenburg with the title name "Master of Sports". Zhdanov was occupied teaching law enforcement officers. He had many students become world championships boxers. He was honored with the Medal of the Order "For Merit to the Fatherland" in the 2nd class. On 25 February 2015, Zhdanov was honored as an honorary citizen of Orenburg.

Zhdanov died in August 2022 in Orenburg, at the age of 87.
