= Lazar Reznikov =

Lazar Osipovich Reznikov
- Born: Lazar Osipovich Reznikov; Лазарь Осипович Резников; 8 December 1905; Chișinău, Kingdom of Romania
- Died: 29 September 1970 (aged 64); Leningrad, Soviet Union
- Occupation: philosopher

Lazar Osipovich Reznikov (Russian: Лазарь Осипович Резников; 8 December 1905 – 29 September 1970) was a Soviet philosopher and one of the pioneers of semiotics studies in Russia. Professor, Doctor of Philosophical Sciences.

== Biography ==
Lazar Osipovich Reznikov was born on 8 December 1905 in Chișinău in the Jewish family. His father was an artisan. In 1929 Lazar Reznikov graduated from the Pedagogical Faculty of the Don University in Rostov-on-Don, where he later worked as an assistant professor of the Department of Dialectical Materialism. In 1933—1936 he continued his studies in graduate school at Moscow Institute of Philosophy, Literature and History, then taught in Odessa. After defending his candidate thesis on the topic "The Marxist-Leninist theory of reflection and criticism of physiological idealism" in 1937 he was appointed head of the Department of Philosophy at Rostov University. In 1948 he defended his doctor thesis on the topic "Problems of the formation of general concepts" and became a professor.

He was arrested during the Campaign against cosmopolitanism in 1949, was expelled from the Communist Party "for the anti-Party activity, which was alien to the interests of the Bolshevik Party and the Soviet people, expressed in propaganda of the ideology of bourgeois cosmopolitanism, counterrevolutionary Trotskyism and right opportunism in his works." In 1950, he was sentenced to 10 years of forced labor camps (in 1954 he was released, rehabilitated, and returned to his previous work).

Since September 1955 he was a professor of the Department of Philosophy of Leningrad State University.

His main research was in the field of the theory of knowledge, general theory of reflection, semiotics and semantics (sign language theory), logic and the history of logic. His monograph "Epistemological Questions of Semiotics" (1964) was translated into a number of foreign languages. Among his most prominent students — Andrey Zdravomyslov.

== Main works ==
- Понятие и слово. Л.: Ленинградский государственный университетт имени А. А. Жданова, 1958.
- Poje̦cie i słowo. Warszawa: Państwowe Wydawnictwo Naukowe, 1960.
- Гносеологические вопросы семиотики. Л.: Ленинградский государственный университетт имени А. А. Жданова, 1964. — 302 с.
- Semiotica e marxismo. I problemi gnoseologici della semiotica. Milan: Bompiani, 1967.
- Erkenntnistheoretische Fragen der Semiotik. Berlin: Deutscher Verlag der Wissenschaften, 1968.
- Вопросы теории познания и методологии научного исследования (редактор). ЛГУ, 1969. — 122 с.
- Вопросы гносеологии, логики и методологии научного исследования (редактор). ЛГУ, 1970.
- Semiótica y teoría del conocimiento. Madrid: Alberto Corazón, 1970.
- Zeichen, Sprache, Abbild. Frankfurt: Syndikat, 1977.
