= Monument to Alexander Matrosov =

Monument in Ufa, Russia

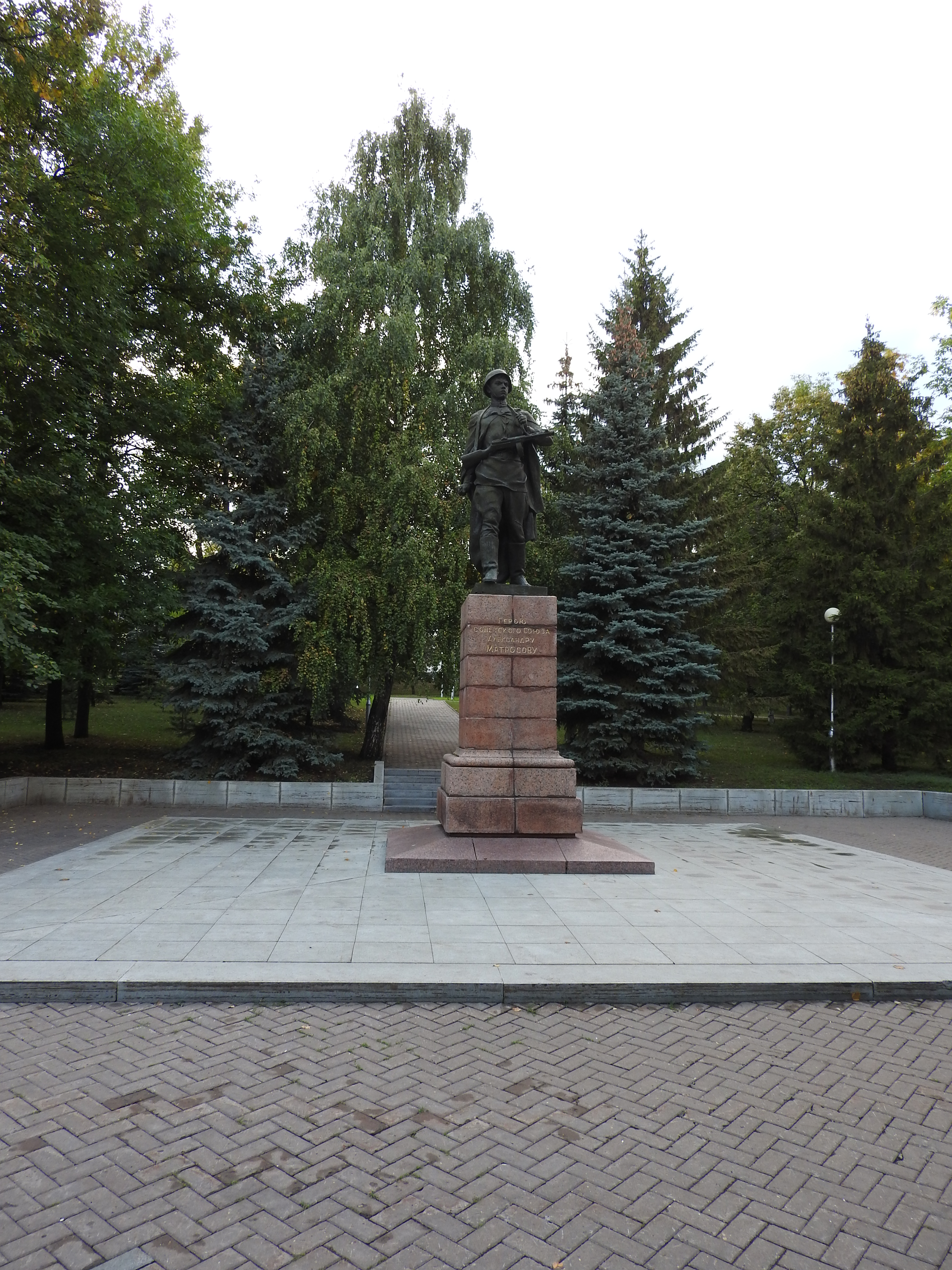
- Interactive map of Monument to Alexander Matrosov
- Location: Bashkortostan, Ufa
- Coordinates: 54.7181°N 55.9428°E
- Dedicated to: Alexander Matrosov

The Monument to Alexander Matrosov (Russian: Памятник Александру Матросову) is a monument in Ufa. It is located in close proximity to the Republic House.

The Monument to Hero of the Soviet Union Alexander Matrosov was erected in Ufa May 9, 1951 in a park renamed in honor of Alexander Matrosov, a Red Army war hero from the Second World War. The monument is made of bronze mounted on a pedestal of pink granite. Standing at 2.5 meters in height, the monument depicts Matrosov full-length in forward motion, with a gun in his hands. On his head is a helmet and over his clothing is a cape. The inscription on the pedestal reads: "Hero of the Soviet Union Alexander Matrosov."
