= Zayatulak and Hyuhylu =

Tstar and Bashkir folk epic

Zayatulak and Hyuhylu (Bashkir: Заятүләк менән Һыуhылыу, romanized: Zayatülək menən Hıwhılıw, Tatar: Заятүләк белән Сусылу, Түләк, Түләк китабы, romanized: Zayatülək belən Suwsıluw, Tülək, Tülək kitabı) is a part-prose, part-poetry epic of the Tatar and Bashkir people who live in Bashkortostan, Russia. It is one of the first Bashkir and Tatar epics.

The main characters are named Zayatulak and Hyuhylu.

== Summary ==
At the start of the epic, Zayatulak dives in a lake, where a mermaid named Hyuhylu lives. The epic is completed with the death of Hyuhylu while she was waiting for Zayatulak, while Zayatulak was riding a tulpar (a legendary winged horse). He was one day away from reaching Hyuhylu. Shortly after, Zayatulak commits suicide in the tomb of Hyuhylu.

== Geographical places named in the epic ==
The epic takes place in the following places in Davlekanovsky district, Bashkortostan:

- Mount Balkan-Tau (Zayatulaktau)
- Lake Kandrykul
- Lake Aslikul

== See also ==
- Ural-batyr
- Akbuzat
