= Monument to Majit Gafuri =

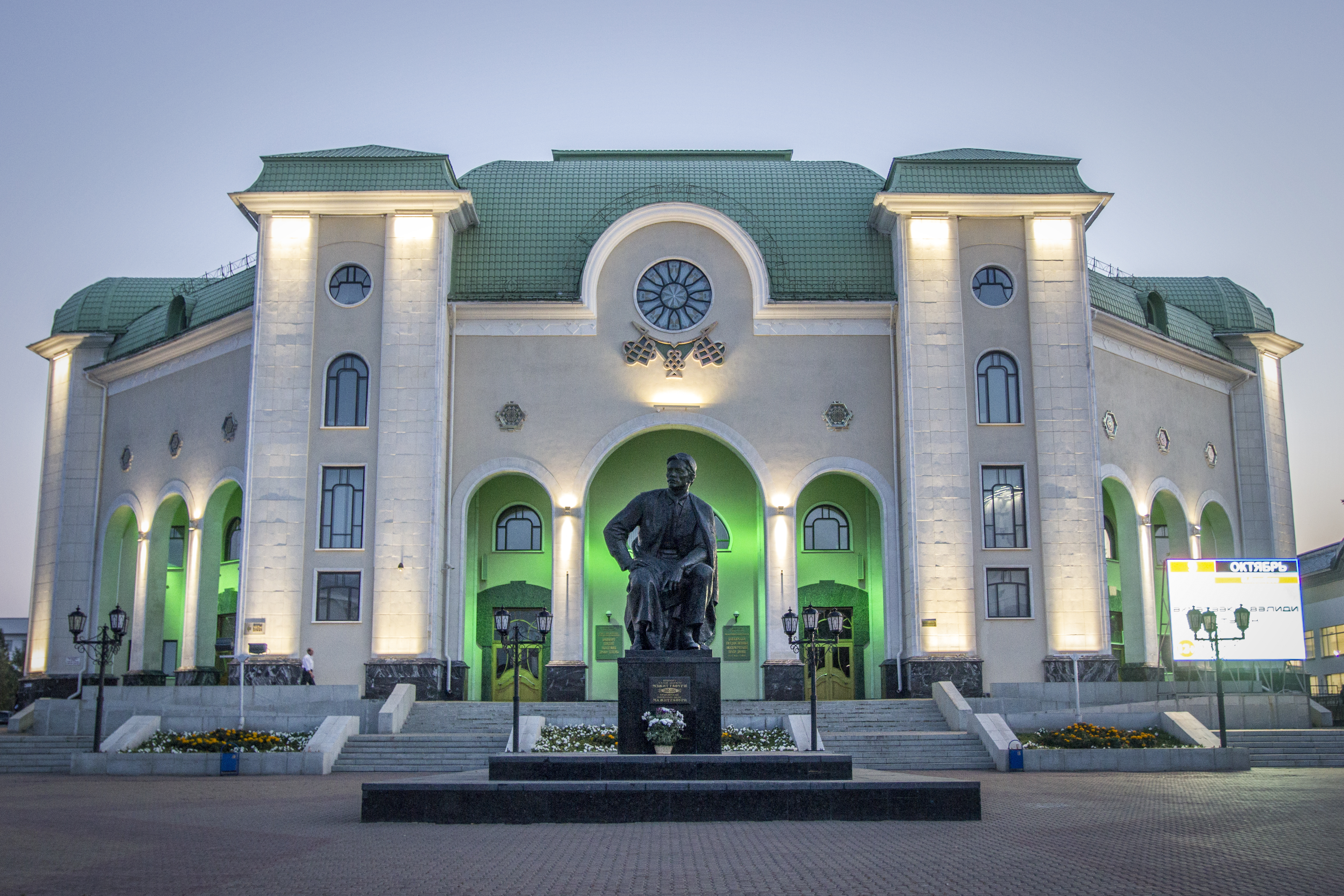
- Location: Bashkortostan, Ufa
- Designer: Lev Kerbel
- Opening date: 1978
- Dedicated to: Majit Gafuri

The Monument to Majit Gafuri is a monument in Ufa. It is located on the square of the Bashkir Academic Drama Theater Mazhit Gafuri. Opened in 1978.
