= Alfred Grishin =

Russian boxing coach (1941–2022)

- Born: Alfred Vladimirovich Grishin; 21 February 1941; Ishim, Tyumen Oblast, Russian SFSR, Soviet Union
- Died: 24 May 2022 (aged 81); Dimitrovgrad, Russia
- Occupation: Boxing coach
- Spouse: Nina Grishin
- Children: 1

Alfred Vladimirovich Grishin (21 February 1941 – 24 May 2022) was a Russian boxing coach.

== Biography ==
Grishin was born in Ishim, Tyumen Oblast, and became a boxing coach in Omsk.

Grishin served as the head of an X-ray subdivision of MSCH-65 from 1978 to 1987, under the Federal Medical-Biological Agency. In 1982, He served as a senior boxing coach in Ulyanovsk. Grishin then served as a senior boxing coach at the Sports School of Dimitrovgrad from 1987 to 1992. He also served as a member of the coaching team for national teams. Grishin served as the director at the Dimitrovgrad Olympic Reserve Boxing School from 1992 to 2015, in which in 2003 the building was named after him.

Grishin was honored with medals, such as, Honored Coach of the RSFSR and USSR and Medal of the Order "For Merit to the Fatherland". He was honored as an honorary citizen in Dimitrovgrad. Grishin was also honored with the degree called "Medal of the Order for Merit for the Fatherland, II" in 1999. He was honored as an honorary citizen in Ulyanovsk in 2002.

Grishin died in May 2022 in Dimitrovgrad, at the age of 81.
