= Institute for Sociology of Education of the Russian Academy of Education =

Research institute in Moscow, Russia

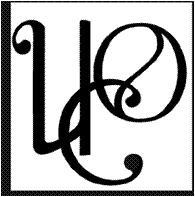
- Other name: ISE RAE
- Parent institution: Russian Academy of Education
- Established: 1993
- President: Vladimir Sobkin
- Formerly called: Centre for Sociology of Education
- Location: Moscow, Russia
- Coordinates: 55.7337°N 37.5697°E
- Interactive map of Institute for Sociology of Education of the Russian Academy of Education
- Website: socioedu.ru

The Institute for Sociology of Education of the Russian Academy of Education (ISE RAE; Russian: Институт социологии образования Российской академии образования (ИСО РАО)) is a Russian research institute in the area of sociology of education.

== About the institute ==
The decision to establish the Centre for Sociology of Education of the Russian Academy of Education (CSE RAE) was made on 22 December 1992. The centre became fully operational at the beginning of 1993. Due to the structure reorganisation of RAE, it was renamed in 2008 to the Institute for Sociology of Education. During this period more than 50 research works were carried out. Since its foundation, the institute has been constantly developing: it accepts new employees, carries out research projects by orders of scientific and public organisations. A great variety of scientific works is being published and translations of important foreign sociological papers are being made.

== Collaboration ==
Nowadays the institute continues working and developing actively. It collaborates with such organisations, funds and instates as:

- Open Society Institute
- UNESCO
- International Society for the Study of Behavioural Development
- Ministry of Education and Science of the Russian Federation
- World Bank
- Moscow Department of Education
- Russian Presidential Council for Culture and Art
- Riga Teacher Training and Educational Management Academy (Latvia)
- Donetsk Institute for Marketing and Social Policy (Ukraine)
- Gorshenin Institute (Ukraine)
- L. N. Gumilev Eurasian National University (Kazakhstan)
- Federal Institute for Educational Development
- Moscow Centre for Education Quality
- Pushkin Museum
- Stavropol State Agrarian University
- Department of Psychology and Pedagogy, Institute of Natural Sciences and Humanities of Siberian Federal University
- Krasnoyarsk Regional Institute of Advanced Training and Professional Retraining of Education Workers
- Moscow Humanitarian Pedagogical Institute
- Moscow State Regional University
- Moscow Theatrical College under the Moscow Theatre of Oleg Tabakov
- Slavonic University of the Republic of Moldova (Moldova)
- Akmulla Bashkir State Pedagogical University
- University of Tyumen
- Institute of Education Management of the Russian Academy of Education
- Ion Creangă State Pedagogical University of Chișinău (Moldova)
- Institute of Pedagogical Education of the Russian Academy of Education
- Russian Scientific Electronic Library
- K. D. Ushinsky State Pedagogical Library
- Moscow School No. 315
- Maksim Tank Belarusian State Pedagogical University (Belarus)

The institute also takes part in a number of international projects.

== Publications ==
=== 2012 ===
- Sociology of Education 2012. New collected stories based on the materials of sociological research which were carried out by ISE RAE team are published. Such questions are analysed in the book: the influence of social differentiation on functional and institutional changes in the sphere of education, socio-cultural transformation of teenager and youth subculture. A number of articles is devoted to culture and art studies.

=== 2011 ===
- Musdienu skoleni Riga un Maskava. In 10–15 years school-leavers will work in different spheres of national economy. Their activity will define the quality of public development. The research discovers social and pedagogical situation which is typical for modern pupils. A multifaceted comparison of pupils from Riga and Moscow is held (their value orientations, views and behaviour).
- Sociology of Education 2011. New collected stories based on the materials of sociological research which were carried out by ISE RAE team are published. Such questions are analysed in the book: the influence of social differentiation on functional and institutional changes in the sphere of education, socio-cultural transformation of teenager and youth subculture.
- Sociology of Education. These collected articles are based on the materials of sociological research which were carried out by ISE RAE team. Such questions are analysed in the book: the influence of social differentiation on functional and institutional changes in the sphere of education, socio-cultural transformation of teenager and youth subculture.

=== 2010 ===
- The Film Scarecrow Through the Eyes of Modern Schoolchildren by V. S. Sobkin, O. S. Markina. The monograph is based on the results of socio-psychological research. Pupils from Moscow schools participated in the study (8, 10 grades). Such questions are analysed in the book: peculiarities in the comprehension of composition of the film Scarecrow, psychological interpretation of key episodes which actualise sense formation and emotional experience during perception. Special attention is paid to the study of film influence on self-concept transformation of teenager audience. Particular parts of the book are devoted to the comprehension of motivational structure of characters' behaviour as well as to the influence of personal school bullying experience on motivational attribution of characters' behaviour.
- Sociology of Education. These collected articles contain the materials of sociological research which were carried out by ISE RAE team. The articles show the results of socio-cultural transformation analysis in the sphere of education. Special attention is paid to the problems of socialisation during preschool age. Changing of diverse stereotypes (in professional sphere, mass media, cinema and fiction) is discussed.

=== 2009 ===
- Teachers' Attitude Towards the Unified State Exam by V. S. Sobkin. The monograph is based on the materials of sociological poll of 2,334 teachers from 4 regions (Moscow, Moscow Oblast, Krasnoyarsk Krai, Stavropol Krai). The work contains the analysis of teachers' opinion of USE adequacy as an objective measure of assessment and entry examination. Special attention is paid to social functions and risks of USE in teachers' point of view. The influence of USE on diverse components of educational activity (aims, content, methods, forms of control) is discussed. Particular part of the book is devoted to improvement of teachers' professional skills in accordance with USE imposition.

=== 2008 ===
- Monitoring of Social Consequences of Informatisation: What Has Changed in School in the Course of Three Years by V. S. Sobkin, D. V. Adamchuk. The monograph is devoted to the problems of educational informatisation and the attitude of the participants of educational process (administrators, teachers and pupils) towards informational communication technologies. The monograph is based on the materials of sociological monitoring research carried out in 2005–2008. 11,219 people from 6 regions participated in the research.

=== 2007 ===
- A Student of Pedagogical University: Estimation of Life and Professional Perspectives by V. S. Sobkin, O. V. Tkachenko. The monograph is based on the results of sociological research which were carried out under the RAE complex programme "Sociology of Education". It contains the materials of sociological poll of 1,469 students from pedagogical universities of Moscow. The book analyses peculiarities of selection to pedagogical universities, students' motivation, professional plans. Special attention is paid to students' attitude towards their education. Some parts of the book are devoted to the process of interaction between students and professors, combination of work and study, participation in scientific research work. The materials of sociological poll are analysed concerning gender, age and socio-stratificational influences.

=== 2006 ===
- Socio-cultural Transformations in Teenager Subculture. These collected articles contain the results of sociological research which were carried out under the RAE complex programme "Sociology of Education". The articles deal with peculiarities of socialisation during teenager period. The attitude of senior pupils towards migrants, teenagers' participation in school self-government, political self-determination, life perspectives and fears are investigated. Special attention is paid to the influence of identification on inter-confessional and international relations.
- Attitude of the Participants in the Educational Process to Information and Communication Technologies by V. S. Sobkin, D. V. Adamchuk. The monograph is based on the materials of sociological poll (administrators, teachers and pupils) carried out in 3 regions of the project "Educational System Informatisation" (Krasnoyarsk Krai, Republic of Karelia, Stavropol Krai). The book deals with diverse effects of school education informatisation which are reflected in both school activity and originality of socio-cultural situation, analyses peculiarities of using ICT on different stages of pedagogical process. Motives and aims of using ICT are investigated. Special attention is paid to studying differences in the process of using ICT in diverse regions (cities, centres, settlements).
- Sociology of Preschool Age. These collected articles are based on the materials of sociological research which were carried out under the RAE complex programme "Sociology of Education". Such questions are discussed in the articles: the influence of socio-stratificational factors on parents' attitude towards preschool upbringing system, transformations of child's subculture (game activity), mass media, artistic activity. Special attention is paid to the relations child-parent (difficulties at adoption).
- Sociology of Education: Talks, Technologies, Methods. These collected articles are based on the materials of sociological research which were carried out under the RAE complex programme "Sociology of Education". The articles deal with important aspects of sociology of education connected with goal and value orientations of school education, socio-cultural technologies of institutional organisation and methods of sociological research.

=== 2005 ===
- A Teenager: Norms, Risks, Deviations. The monograph is based on the results of sociological poll of 3,000 teenagers (7, 9 and 11 grades). Teenager subcultural transformations during preschool and youth periods are examined. Special attention is paid to teenager's inclination to deviant behaviour: smoking, alcohol, drugs, fights, leaving home etc. Reactions of macrosocial surrounding (peers, parents, teachers) are analysed.

=== 2004 ===
- Tolerance in Teenager and Youth Environment. These collected articles are based on the results of investigations carried out under the Federal Target Programme "Set Formation of Tolerant Consciousness and Prevention from Extremism in the Russian Community" (2001–2005). The book investigates displays of tolerance at different ages: preschool age, teenager subculture and among students. Special attention is paid to peculiarities in teenager's attitude towards extremism and terrorism. The influence of social self-determination on actualisation of tolerant/intolerant sets is discussed.
- Sociology of Education 1980–2003. The book contains bibliography on sociology during the period of 1980–2003. It is formed by catalogues of large Russian libraries, publications in central magazines, monographs, scientific books, materials of conferences and websites.
- Sociology of Education. These collected articles contain the results of sociological research which were carried out under CSE RAE complex programme. The articles discover formation of socio-cultural approach in the sphere of education in the 20th century, give characteristics of foreign sociological investigations. Special parts are devoted to concrete sociological research of teenager subculture, teachers and students.

=== 2003 ===
- Age Peculiarities in Tolerance Formation. The book is based on the results of investigations carried out under the Federal Target Programme "Set Formation of Tolerant Consciousness and Prevention from Extremism in the Russian Community: Socio-cultural Dynamic and Institutional Transformations". The book investigates displays of tolerance at different ages: preschool age, teenager subculture and among students. Displays of tolerance among informal groups (skinheads, punks, Tolkienists, hippies, rappers) are discussed. The influence of identification peculiarities on tolerance and intolerance is analysed.
- Problems of Tolerance in Teenager Subculture. The book is based on the results of investigations carried out under Federal Target Programme "Set Formation of Tolerant Consciousness and Prevention from Extremism in the Russian Community" (2001–2005) and "Education in the Russian Community: Socio-cultural Dynamic and Institutional Transformations". The monograph examines peculiarities of different spheres of social reality: inter-confessional and international relations, interaction with representatives of informal groups, attitude towards representatives of risk groups (alcoholics, drug addicts, HIV-infected etc.).

=== 2002 ===
- Sociology of Family Education: Preschool Age by V. S. Sobkin, E. M. Marich. The monograph is based on the results of sociological study carried out under investigational programme of CSE RAE. The book contains materials of sociological polls of parents and children of preschool age. The work analyses value orientations and upbringing strategies of parents, their attitude towards state preschool system. Special attention is paid to the influence of demographic and socio-stratificational factors on the formation of parents' upbringing strategies. A particular accent is made on revealing parents' upbringing strategies used for boys and girls in full and one-parent family. The influence of parents' upbringing strategies on child's development is investigated.
- Applied Aspects of Social Engineering: Sociology of Education in Post-Revolutionary Russia (1917–1930) by K. V. Faradzhev. The monograph is based on the analysis of publications edited in 1917–1930. The research was carried out under investigational programme of CSE RAE. The book analyses institutional peculiarities of the educational system in post-revolutionary Russia, describes formation and failure of pedagogical movement, investigates language peculiarities in sociology of education, analyses sociological research devoted to exposure of professional orientations and socio-cultural ideals of students and enlighteners.

=== 2001 ===
- The Adolescent: Virtuality and Social Reality by V. S. Sobkin, Yu. M. Evstigneeva. The monograph is based on the results of sociological study of teachers, pupils and PTS students. The work was carried out under investigational programme of CSE RAE "New Informational Technologies and Mass Media as Forming Factors of Teenager and Youth Subculture". The book analyses the significance of new informational technologies in leisure and informational space of modern teenagers, peculiarities of pupils' interest in a computer world, the role of new informational technologies in educational process and the influence of regular computer use on academic success; access to new informational technologies of school pupils and PTS students is compared. Peculiarities of teenagers' attitude towards computer games are examined: motivation, genre preferences, emotional state during games and consequences of computer games. Specificity of Internet use and content peculiarities of virtual communication are studied.
- Jewish Kindergarten in Russia: Problems, Contradictions, Perspectives by V. S. Sobkin, E. K. Elyashevich, E. M. Marich. The monograph is based on the results of comparative socio-psychological research of teachers, parents and children of Jewish and Russian kindergartens. The research was carried out under investigational programme of CSE RAE. The work analyses general life orientations of teachers, their professional sets, peculiarities of pedagogical realisation, professional competence and satisfaction. Life values of parents, strategies of upbringing and their attitude towards kindergarten are investigated. Peculiarities of intellectual development and emotional state of children in their families and kindergartens are studied.

=== 2000 ===
- A Kindergarten Teacher: Life Values and Professional Orientations. The book is devoted to the studies of socio-cultural peculiarities in mass media and computer influence on education. The articles are based on the materials of research works carried out in CSE RAE.
- Education and Informational Culture. The book is devoted to the studies of socio-cultural peculiarities in mass media and computer influence on education. The articles are based on the materials of research works carried out in CSE RAE.

=== 1998 ===
- Political Sociology of Educational Reforms: Power/Knowledge in Education, Teachers Training and Research. The book was written by one of the leading American researchers in the field of education. Philosophical reasons and socio-cultural tendencies which determine reformatory educational processes are analysed in the book. It realises a complex philosophical, sociological and historical approach to studies of educational policy.
- Ethnos. Identity. Education. These collected articles are devoted to socio-ethnological problems of modern education. It contains the analysis of possible directions in research works, discussions about new conceptual approaches to social and national identity, descriptions of tendencies connected with national ethnic inequality in the sphere of education. Some articles show concrete results of empirical investigations. Such aspects are analysed there: the attitude of senior pupils towards national policy, specificity of formation value process of different national groups, the role of macrosocial surrounding in identity formation. The peculiarities of self-concept of the Russian, Tatar, Bashkir, Tuvan and Jewish teenagers are shown on the materials of psycho-semantic research. The book is addressed to specialists who work in spheres of pedagogy, sociology, psychology, ethnography and culturology. The materials can be used for a student training on sociological and psychological faculties, training courses for employees of educational organisations. The research were carried out due to the Russian Humanist Scientific Fund.
- Russian Teenager of the 90s: Movement into the Risk Zone by V. S. Sobkin, N. I. Kuznetsova. The report is devoted to the analysis of problems connected with sex education of teenagers and senior pupils. Such topics are considered in the report: aspects of social dynamic of teenager sex behaviour, way of model translation of sex behaviour in mass media, modern family state in Russia, teenagers' attitude towards family relations, teenagers' awareness about sex relations, peculiarities of communication about sex relations.
- Types of Regional Educational Situations in the Russian Federation by V. S. Sobkin, P. S. Pisarsky. The book demonstrates socio-cultural macrotendencies which characterise modern state of educational system in Russia. Basing on factor and cluster analysis a model of socio-cultural educational typology of the Russian regions is formed. Dynamic changes of institutions, pupils' contingent and employee potential are described. The book is addressed to scientific, educational workers, teachers and students of pedagogical universities.

=== 1997 ===
- A High School Student in the World of Politics. The monograph is based on the materials of questionnaire poll of 1,604 Moscow senior pupils. The poll was held by CSE RAE in spring 1996 (it was the period of the election presidential campaign). The study describes pupils' attitude towards a wide range of political aspects: government system, economy, social policy, military reform, prevention of crime, mass-media control etc. A special part is devoted to studies of the attitude towards political leaders.
- A Teenager with a Hearing Defect: Value Orientations, Life Plans, Social Connections. The book was written by one of the leading American researchers in the field of education. Philosophical reasons and socio-cultural tendencies which determine reformatory educational processes are analysed in the book. It realises a complex philosophical, sociological and historical approach to studies of educational policy.
- A Teacher and a Senior Pupil in the World of Artistic Culture. The book reflects the results of studying the dynamic of artistic preferences of teachers and senior pupils basing on sociological polls (1976, 1991, 1994, 1996). This work discovers peculiarities of artistic preferences among teachers and senior pupils as well as the consumption intensity of different arts: visual arts, music, theatre, cinematography, fiction, TV shows and periodicals.

=== 1995 ===
- Value Normative Orientations of a Modern Senior Pupil. These collected articles contain the results of sociological research which were carried out by CSE RAE team. The main goal of these studies is an attempt to show socialisation peculiarities of a modern teenager in conditions of value normative uncertainty and social instability.

=== 1993 ===
- Russian School at the Turn of the 90s: A Sociological Analysis. Collected articles are devoted to the analysis of Russian schools' condition at the turn of the 1990s and of the attitude of teachers, parents, senior pupils in general schools and PTS towards education.
- Sociology of Education. This book is the first one in the series entitled "Studies on Sociology of Education". The first part contains articles that deal with the problems of sociology of education. Impartial picture of the formation and development of sociology of education is depicted.

=== 1992 ===
- Socio-cultural Analysis of Educational Situation in a Megalopolis by V. S. Sobkin, P. S. Pisarsky. The book presents the results of sociological poll of 2,736 teachers, pupils and parents who live in Moscow. This poll was held in April–May 1991. The research was carried out under scientific investigation project "Socio-cultural Analysis of Educational Situation in a Megalopolis" (Federal complex programme of scientific pedagogical studies of the Russian Ministry of Education "Educational Development in Russia").
- Sociological Portrait of a PTS Student (Professional Technical School) by V. S. Sobkin, P. S. Pisarsky. The brochure depicts the results of sociological poll of 2,857 students who study in PTSs. This poll was held under scientific investigation project "Satisfaction in PTS System in Medium and Small Cities" (Federal complex programme of scientific pedagogical studies of the Russian Ministry of Education "Educational Development in Russia"). The poll was held in 12 medium and small cities.
- Dynamics of Art Preferences of Senior Pupils by V. S. Sobkin, P. S. Pisarsky. The book shows the results of studying dynamic of artistic preferences of senior pupils on the basement of sociological polls held in 1976–1991. This work discovers dynamic of artistic preferences of different art genres: visual arts, music, theatre, cinematography, fiction. The popularity of diverse TV shows and periodicals was analysed.

== Vladimir Sobkin ==
Scientific interests: sociology of education; infant, age and pedagogical psychology; psychology of art. Vladimir Samuilovich Sobkin is the initiator and the author of many research works in the sphere of sociology of education. He made a considerable contribution in the development of theoretical and applied aspects of sociology of education, social, age and pedagogical psychology. Particularly he has worked out methodological principles of multiway sociological analysis of educational situation, suggested the idea of socio-cultural educational trajectories, investigated types of parents' upbringing strategies. In the early 1990s, he was a co-head in the development of the first Russian Federal Target Complex Programme "Russian Education During Transitional Period: Stabilisation and Developmental Programme" (1991). At the same time he was an adviser of the Minister of Education on the problems of sociology, the head of social service and a member of the Board of the Ministry of Education. In 1992 due to his initiative Centre for Sociology of Education of the Russian Academy of Education was established, and he became its director-organiser (up to nowadays). In 2008, the centre was transformed into Institute for Sociology of Education RAE. It is the main organisation which implements RAE complex programmes in the sphere of sociology of education. Under the guidance of Sobkin, a number of large sociological research was carried out; it was aimed at receiving new fundamental knowledge and shaping scientific potential for the development of sociology of education as a scientific discipline. The results of these investigations are implemented into scientific pedagogical practice and accelerate quality changes in educational sphere, its transformation into a model of stable innovative development which provides institutional and functional modernisation of Russian education, rise of its competitiveness. Sobkin is the head and the author of scientific research projects which were carried out within the bounds of Federal Target Programmes: "Educational Development in Russia", "The Children of Russia", "The Children of Chernobyl", "Set Formation of Tolerant Consciousness and Prevention of Extremism in the Russian Society" (2001–2005), "Informatisation of Educational System". By the order of UNESCO an analytic report about deviant displays of teenager subculture was prepared (Russian Teenager of the 90s: Movement into the Risk Zone). A great number of scientific applied studies were carried out under the guidance of Sobkin by orders of several ministries and departments (Ministry of Education and Science, Moscow Department of Education, regional governing authorities of education of Krasnoyarsk Krai, Stavropol Krai, Republic of Karelia, Omsk Oblast etc.). The results of these investigations were used to work out regional developmental educational programmes. Sobkin is a doctor of psychology, professor, academician of the Russian Academy of Education. He is the author of more than 400 scientific works, which were published both in Russia and abroad. Only during last years he published a number of monographs appreciated by scientific and pedagogical community: Sociology of Family Education: Preschool Age (2002), Problems of Tolerance in Teenager Subculture (2003), The Adolescent: Virtuality and Social Reality (2004, published in the US), A Teenager: Norms, Risks, Deviations (2005), Attitude of the Participants in the Educational Process to Information and Communication Technologies (2006), A student of Pedagogical University: Estimation of Life and Professional Perspectives (2007), Monitoring of Social Consequences of Informatisation: What Has Changed in School in the Course of Three Years? (2008), Teachers' Attitude Towards the Unified State Exam (On the Materials of Sociological Research) (2009). In addition, more than 20 issues were published in scientific series "Studies on Sociology of Education" edited by Sobkin. Under the guidance of Sobkin, the Institute for Sociology of Education has become a scientific institution which affectively explores the problems of sociology, connected with modernisation of Russian education. Studies carried out in the institute were recognised by scientific and pedagogical community. Scientific employee team and Sobkin were awarded with the Russian Presidential Prize in Education for 2001. The institute has postgraduate course and trains qualified specialists among young scientists. A big number of Candidate Theses in sociology, psychology and pedagogy was successfully defended under the guidance of Sobkin. Now Sobkin is scientific head of theses of 8 postgraduate students. He is a member of council on candidate and doctor theses defence in psychology (MSU, MPSU). Besides scientific and organisational activity, Sobkin is a chairman of the Ethno-psychological section of the Russian Psychological Society, editor of scientific series "Studies on Sociology of Education", a member of the editorial board for Voprosy Psikhologii, Mental Health of Children and Adolescent and other journals. Sobkin was awarded "Honorary Science Worker of the Russian Federation" (October 2008) and was decorated with the Medal of the Order "For Merit to the Fatherland", 2nd class (April 2004), Medal "In Commemoration of the 850th Anniversary of Moscow" (October 1997). In addition, he has such awards: Badge "Honorary Worker of General Education of the Russian Federation" (2002), Russian Ministry of Education Certificate of Honour (April 2000), Medal of K. D. Ushinsky (June 1998), Golden Medal of the Russian Academy of Education "For Achievements in Science" (November 2007).
