= Gyulli Mubaryakova =

Soviet actress (1936–2019)

- Гюлли Мубарякова
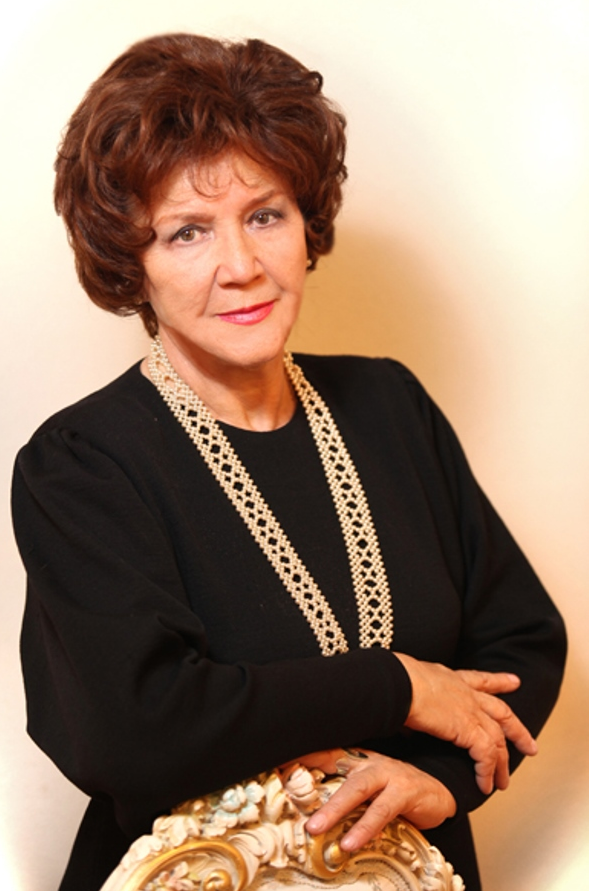
- Born: 9 or 19 September 1936; Ufa
- Died: 20 February 2019 (aged 82); Ufa
- Occupations: actress, director, professor
- Employer: Bashkir Academic Drama Theater Mazhit Gafuri
- Parent(s): Arslan Mubaryakov, Yanbulatova, Ragida Saitgaleevna

Gyulli Mubaryakova or Gyulli Arslanovna Mubaryakova (9 or 19 September 1936 – 20 February 2019) was a Soviet actress. She led the Bashkir Drama Theatre and became a People's Artist of the USSR.

== Life ==
Mubaryakova was born in 1936 in Ufa on 9 September or others say 19 September. Her parents were noted actors. Her father was Arslan Mubaryakov and her mother was the actor, poet and translator Ragida Saitgaleevna Yanbulatova.

She worked with O. Pyzhova and B. Bibikov at the Bashkir studio of GITIS and graduated in 1959; joining the Bashkir Drama Theater in the same year.

In 1969 she was made an Honored Artist of the Bashkir Autonomous Soviet Socialist Republic and in 1991 she became the director of the Bashkir Drama Theater.

In 1978 she appeared in the Russian film "On the Night of the Lunar Eclipse" and in the same year she staged әйгәнемдең тыуған көнө (1987; “Birthday of the beloved”) at the Bashkir Drama Theatre.

She was a Professor of Acting and Directing at the Ufa State Academy of Arts and in 1990 she became a People's Artist of the USSR.

Mubaryakova died in her hometown on 20 February 2019.
