= Kandrykul =

Kandrykul Кандрыкуль
- Selo
- Location within Bashkortostan Location within Russia
- Coordinates: 54°29′N 54°01′E
- Country: Russia
- Region: Bashkortostan
- District: Tuymazinsky District
- Time zone: UTC+5:00

Kandrykul (Russian: Кандрыкуль; Bashkir: Ҡандракүл, Qandrakül) is a rural locality (a selo) in Nikolayevsky Selsoviet, Tuymazinsky District, Bashkortostan, Russia. The population was 547 as of 2010. There are 2 streets.

== Geography ==
Kandrykul is located 30 km southeast of Tuymazy (the district's administrative centre) by road. Kandry-Tyumekeyevo is the nearest rural locality.
