= Bashkir Academic Drama Theater Mazhit Gafuri =

Bashkir-language Drama Theater in Ufa, Russia

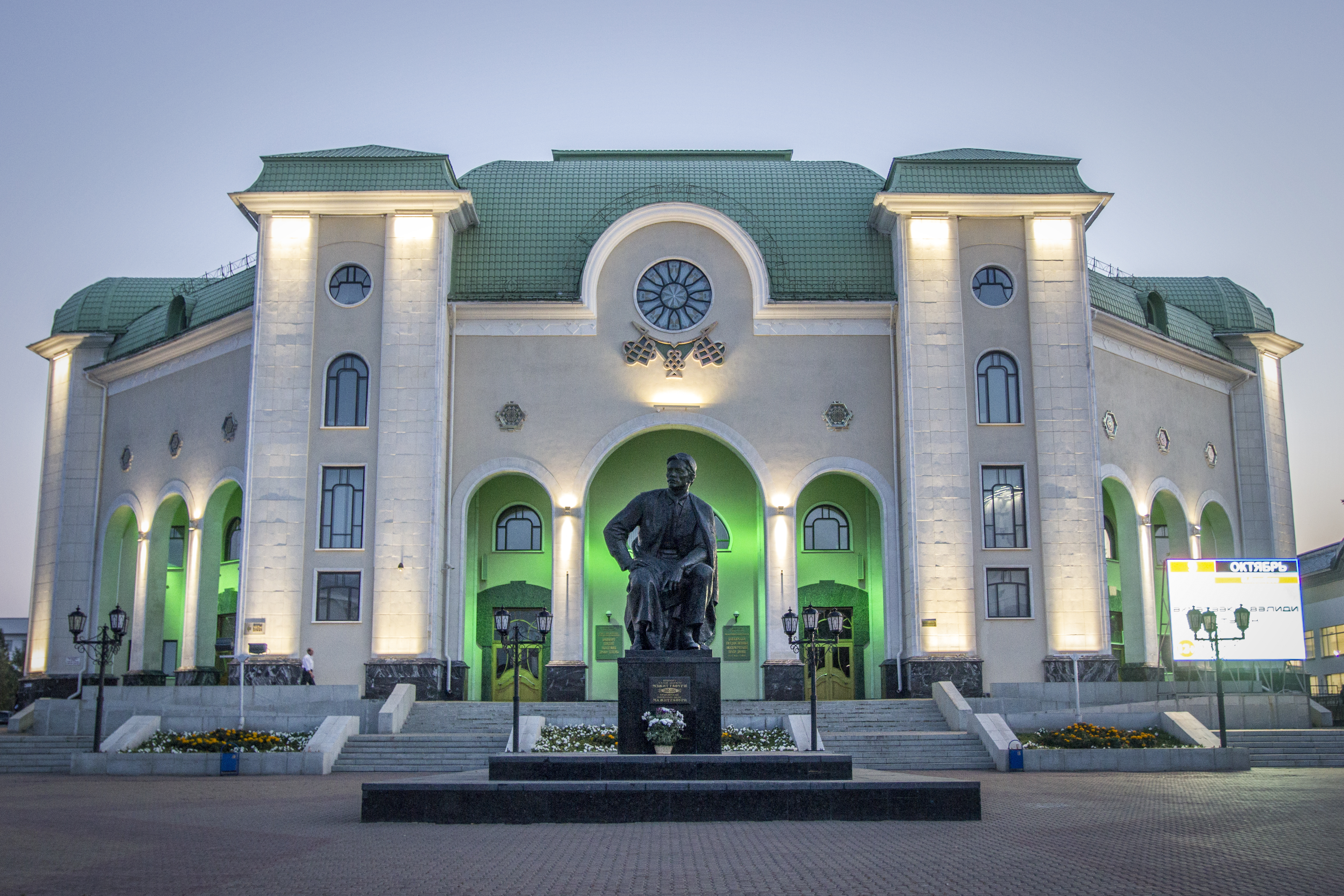
- Interactive map of Bashkir Academic Drama Theater Mazhit Gafuri
- Location: Ufa, Bashkortostan, Russia
- Coordinates: 54°43′08″N 55°56′28″E

Construction
- Opened: December 4, 1919

Website
- http://www.bashdram.ru/

Bashkir State Academic Drama Theater Majit Gafuri (Bashkir: Мәжит Ғафури исемендәге Башҡорт дәүләт академия драма театры, romanized: Məjit Ğafuri isemendəge Başqort dəwlət akademiya drama teatrı) operates in the Ufa city, the capital of the Republic of Bashkortostan of Russian Federations. The foundation of the theater was laid on December 4, 1919, in Sterlitamak – the capital of the Bashkir Autonomous Soviet Socialist Republic. Its first art director was Valiulla Mortazin-Imansky. The theater has been moved to Ufa since 1922 and joined with the Tatar-Bashkir troupe of the Ufa State Theater. It has the status of academic drama theater since 1935 and was renamed as Majit Gafuri in 1971. The monument of "Majit Gafuri" was erected in front of the theater.

== History of the theater ==
The theater was officially established – on December 4, 1919, in Sterlitamak — as the First Bashkir State Theater. The first artistic director and director was Valiulla Mortazin-Imansky.

For a long time, it took shape from professional and semi-professional stage associations "Sayyar", "Nur", "Shirkat", "Fazhiga ve Mosekkin Islam" Ilyasbek Kudashev-Ashkazarsky, the Red Army theaters of the times October Revolution and the Civil War.

In the early years, the theater's repertoire included the following works: "Salawat-batyr" and "Akshan-batyr" (staged in 1920) Abdulkadir Inan (F. Suleymanov), "Knights of the Fatherland" by G. Tuykin (1920), "Ashkadar" and "Alpamysha" Mukhametsha Burangulov, "Maktymykhylu" and "Karagul" Daut Yultiy, "Shoes" (1922) and "Zulkhabira" Khabibulla Ibragimov; works of Tatar playwrights "Galiyabanu" Mirheidar Fayzi (as amended by V. Murtazin-Imansky), "Unhappy Young Man" by G. Kamal, "Marriage Contract" by G. Iskhaki, "Unequal" by F. Amirkhan, "Tahir and Zuhra" by F. Burnash, "Enemies" F Sayfi-Kazanli.

In addition, there were performances staged on the classical plays of playwrights in Russia and other countries: "Examiner" Nikolai Gogol, "Guilty without guilt", Thunderstorm, "In a busy place" Alexander Ostrovsky, "The wedding of Krechinsky" Alexander Sukhovo-Kobylin "King Oedipus" Sophocles, "Mean" and "Reluctant Healer" Moliere.

The first part of the troupe included A. Abzelilov, Suleiman Valiev-Sulva, M. Gainislamova-Kazakkulova, G. Gumerskaya, I. Zaini, M. Imanskaya, Galimjan Karamyshev, H. Sabitov, F. Samitova, E. Shlyakhtin-Syrtlanov, R. Urmantsev, G. Ushanov, Z. and R. Yakupova, artist Sabit Yakshibaev, musical director- composer, actor and playwright H.K. Ibragimov.

In 1922, the theater staff was transferred to Ufa, where it merged with the Tatar troupe of the Ufa State Exhibition Theater and is called the Bashkir State Drama Theater. In 1935, the theater received the title Academic. The artistic directors of the theater were: Arslan Mubaryakov (1937–1938), T. G. Imashev (1938–1939, 1941–1942), Khazhi (Khaziakhmet) Galimov-Bukhara (1939–1941), Vali (Valiakhmet) Galimov (1942–1945); set designers: S. I. Nikandrov, Galia Imasheva, Mukhamed Arslanov; the musical part was led by composers Kamil Rakhimov, Masalim Valeev, Tahir (Tahiryan) Karimov

In the 1930s and 1940s, performances about the history of the Bashkir people were staged at the theater: "Salawat and Pugachev" by Inan, Yultiy and Murtazin-Imansky, "Salawat" by Murtazin-Imansky, "Ynyykay and Yuldykay", Khabibichu Gabitov, "Bashkir Wedding" and "Shaura" by Burangulov, "The Black Faces" Majit Gafuri, "Zimagors" (Wage-earners) Sagit Miftakhov, "Karlugas" Bayazit Bikbai. Also, in the repertoire there were performances telling about revolutionary events in the country, about people of work.

The theater turned more and more to examples of classical literature: "Sheep source" Lope de Vega, "Othello" Shakespeare, "Tradesman in the nobility" Moliere, "Boris Godunov" Alexander Pushkin, "Examiner" of Gogol, "Rоbbers" Schiller, "Princess Turandot" Carlo Gozzi, "Almansur" G. Heine, "Guilty without guilty" by A. N. Ostrovsky, "The Green Parrot, or On the Night of the Bastille" by A. Schnitzler, "On bottom", "Egor Bulychov and others" M. Gorky, "Shahname" by M. Janan (according to Firdousi).

In 1981, the main director and artistic director of the theater became Rifkat Israfilov.

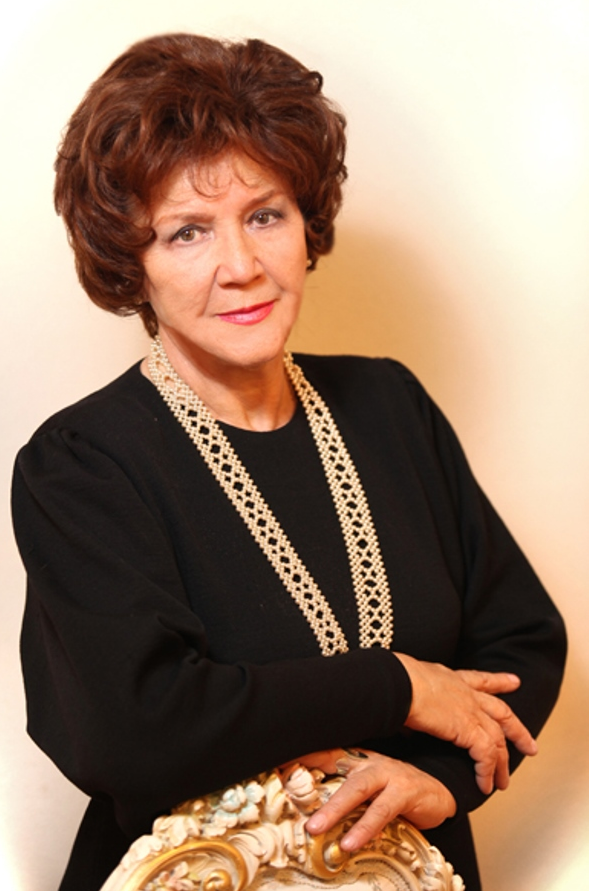
Gulli Mubaryakova

In 1991, the theater was directed by the People's Artist of the USSR Gully Mubaryakova. During the period 1997–2000 the People's Artist of the Republic of Bashkortostan Azat Nadyrgulov became the artistic director.

In 2000, after a minor fire, the theater took on an updated look. Taking great care and understanding the need for additional support, the President of the Republic of Bashkortostan Murtaza Rakhimov signed a decree on February 5, 2001 "On the Bashkir State Academic Drama Theater named after Mazhit Gafuri". In 2001, the Decree of the President of the Republic of Bashkortostan M. Rakhimov approved the theater's multifunctional directorate: Guldar Muratova, deputy minister of culture of the Republic of Belarus, was appointed general director, and Khurmatulla Utyashev, director of main activities. The directors invited by the contract work in the theater: I. Gilyazhev, N. Abdykadyrov, B. Mandzhiev F. Bikchentaev, M. Rabinovich, P. Shein and others.

In 2006, Honored Cinema Worker of the Republic of Belarus, Honored Filmmaker of Russia R.A. Ismagilov; November 8, 2007, opened a small stage of the theater. From 2012 to the present, the artistic director of the theater is the Honored Artist of the Russian Federation (1987), Republic of Bаshkortostan (1983), laureate of the State Prize of the Republic of Bashkortostan named after Salawat Yulayev (1986), laureate of the State Prize of the Russian Federation in the field of literature and art (1995), laureate Prizes to them. A. Yablochkina in the nomination "Best Actor" (Moscow,1995), laureate of the Orenburg Lira Prize (2003, 2012), professor, corresponding member of the Petrovsky Academy of Sciences and Arts (2005) Oleg Khanov.

The theater opened the 100th anniversary theater season in September 2019.

== Modern theater ==
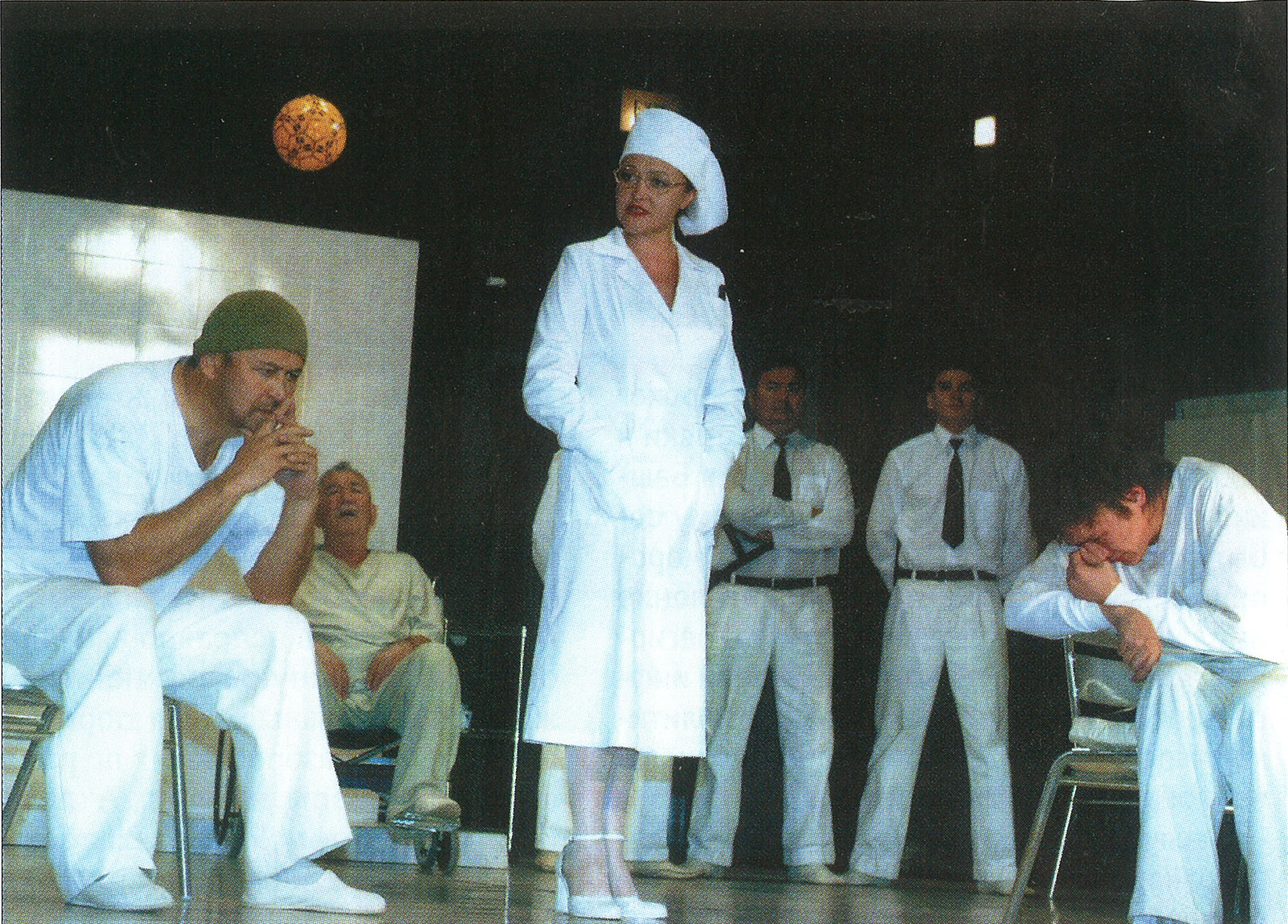
Scene from the play One Flew Over the Cuckoo's Nest directed by the Bashkir Academic Drama Theater. In the role of Mak Murphy Khurmatulla Utyashev, elder sister – Elvira Yunusova

The modern building is located on the site of the (dismantled in 1932) Resurrection Cathedral. The theater building was declared an architectural monument.

In 2017, the director of the theater became Irshat Fayzullin, before that Oleg Khanov was the director.

== Awards and prizes ==
- Prize II International Festival of Turkic-speaking theaters "Tuganlyk" in the nomination "The best performance of the festival" for the performance "Bibinur, ah, Bibinur!" Florid Bulyakov (1996).
- Prize of the IV International Festival of Turkic-speaking theaters "Tuganlyk" in the nomination "The Best Performance of the Festival" for the performance "Kekuek Oyahy" – "Flight over the Cuckoo's Nest" Airat Abushakhmanoм, one by one. the novel K. Kesey (2006).
- Theater Award "Golden Mask" (Moscow) in the nomination "Special Award of the Jury of the Drama and Puppet Theater" – "For the stage reading of Guzely Yakhina’s novel "Zuleikha Opens Her Eyes" (2018).

== Famous artists ==
- Beder Yussupova (1901–1969)- first Bashkir professional actress, Honored Artist of the Russian Federation
- Arslan Mubaryakov (1908–1977) -People's Artist of the USSR
- Khusseyn Kudashev (1913–1986)-People's Artist of the USSR
- Zeytuna Bikbulatova (1908–1992)-People's Artist of the USSR
- Gabdoulla Gilyajev(1930–1997) – Honored Artist of the Russian Federation
- Gully Mubaryakova (1936–1919) -People's Artist of the USSR
- Oleg Khanov (1951)- Laureate of the State Prize of the Russian Federation in the field of literature and art (1995)
- Noureya Irssayeva(1942)- People's Artist of the Russian Federation

== See also ==
- Bashkir State Opera and Ballet Theater
- Monument to Majit Gafuri

== Literature ==
- Bashkir State Academic Drama Theater. Comp. V. G. Galimov, S. S. Saitov. Ufa, 1969.
- Mәһәҙiev. M. Tourһynda Theater. Mәҡәlәlәr yiyyntyғy. Өфө, 1962. // Magadiev M. About the theater. Digest of articles. Ufa, 1962. * Kusimova S . Bashkir academic 75 years. – Ufa, 1995.
- Repertoire of the Bashkir State Academic Drama Theater named after Mazhit Gafuri 1919 – 2009 / Comp. A.A. Balgazin, M.A. Valitova. – Ufa: Kitap, 2009 .-- 88 pp., Ill. ISBN 978-5-295-04626-1
