= Alexander Matrosov =

Soviet WWII war hero

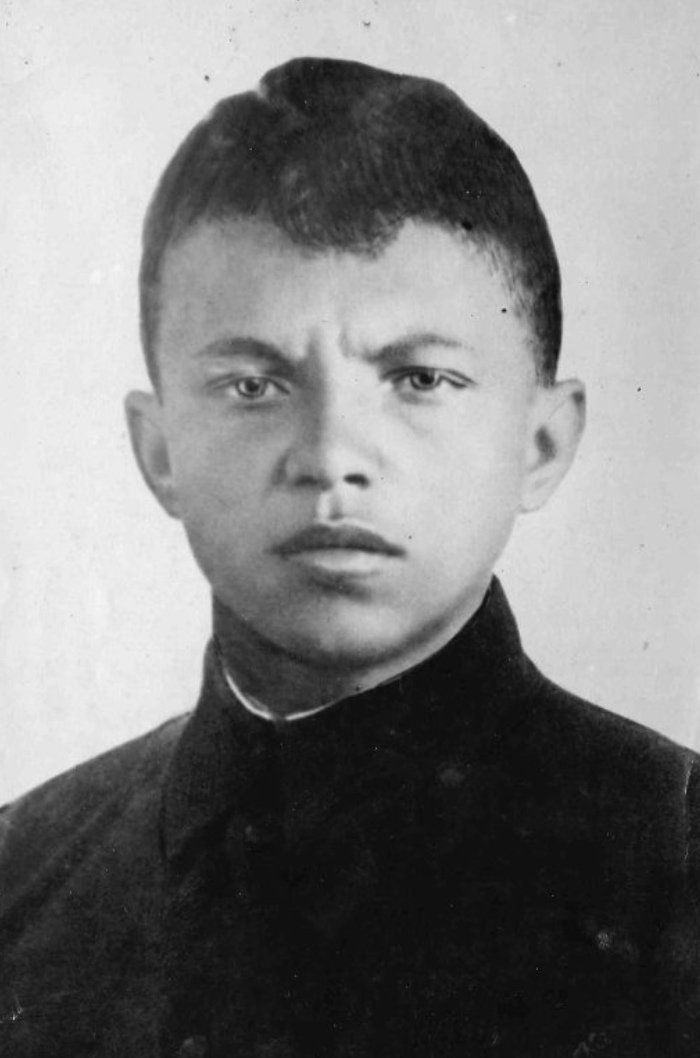
- Born: 5 February 1924; Yekaterinoslav (now Dnipro), Ukraine SSR, Soviet Union/disputed
- Died: 27 February 1943 (aged 19); Chernushki, Loknyansky District, Pskov Oblast, Soviet Union
- Military career
- Allegiance: Soviet Union
- Branch: Red Army
- Service years: 1942–1943
- Rank: Private
- Units: 2nd Separate Rifle Battalion
- Conflicts: World War II †
- Awards: Hero of the Soviet Union

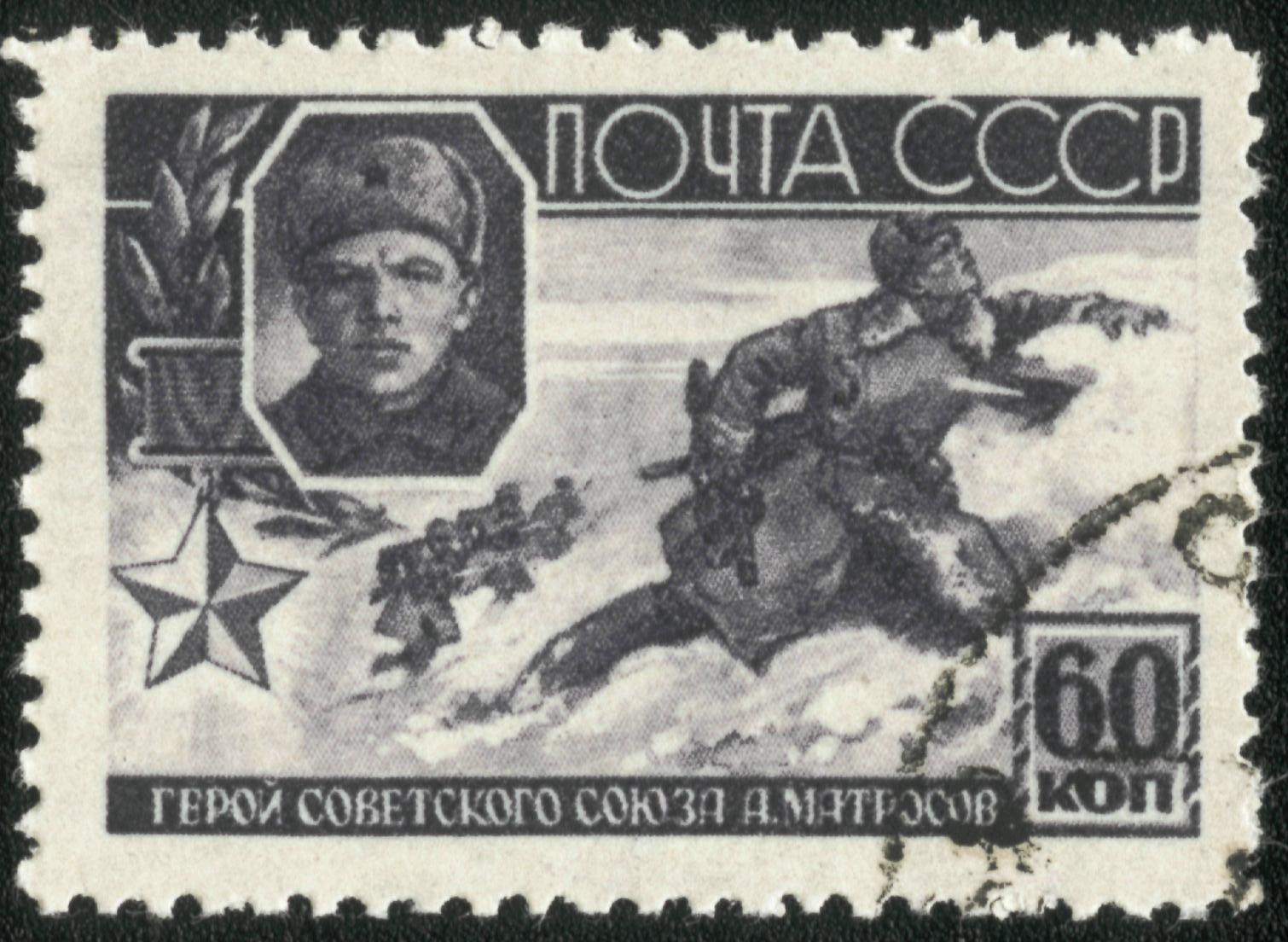
Matrosov on a 1944 stamp

Alexander Matveyevich Matrosov (Russian: Алекса́ндр Матве́евич Матро́сов February 5, 1924 – February 27, 1943) was a Soviet infantry soldier during the Second World War, posthumously awarded the title of the Hero of the Soviet Union reportedly for blocking a German machine-gun with his body.

His official Soviet biography states he was born in Yekaterinoslav (now Dnipro). However an evidence emerged that both his name and place of birth were invented by him while he was a street child. There are several versions about his origins.

== Acts of bravery ==
Matrosov was a private in the 2nd Separate Rifle Battalion of the 91st Independent Siberian Volunteer Brigade, later renamed and the 254th Rifle Regiment and reorganized within the 56th Guards Rifle Division of the Soviet Army. He was armed with a light machine-gun.

On 23 and 24 February 1943, in the battle to recapture village of Chernushki, near Velikiye Luki, currently in Loknyansky District, Pskov Oblast, the Soviet forces struggled to take a German heavy machine-gun, housed within a concrete pillbox, which blocked the route to the village. It had already claimed the lives of many of the Red Army troops. Matrosov crept up to the pillbox and released a burst of rounds into the slot in the pillbox. One round hit a mine inside, and the machine-gun temporarily fell silent. It restarted a few minutes later. At this point Matrosov physically pulled himself up and jammed his body into the slot, wholly blocking the fire at his comrades but clearly at the cost of his own life. This allowed his unit to advance and capture the pillbox and thereafter retake the village.

For his self-sacrifice in battle, Matrosov was posthumously awarded the distinction Hero of the Soviet Union and the Order of Lenin.

Stalin officially renamed his regiment the Matrosov Regiment.

According to one of versions Alexander Matrosov was actually of a Bashkir ethnic minority and his real name Shakiryan Muhammedyanov was Russified.

On 5 January 2023, the day after the monument to Matrosov in his place of birth Dnipro, Ukraine (then Yekaterinoslav, USSR) was dismantled in as part of the derussification and decommunization campaigns following the 2022 Russian invasion of Ukraine, Mayor of Dnipro Borys Filatov claimed that Matrosov had never been to Yekaterinoslav but he had pretended to be born there so that he looked like a Russian person in Soviet documents. Filatov also stated that Matrosov was actually of Bashkir ethnicity.

=== Similar cases ===
More than two hundred people were posthumously awarded by the Soviet government for blocking enemy pillboxes with their bodies.

According to Beijing People's Daily, Matrosov's tale also inspired Huang Jiguang, a famous Chinese revolutionary martyr, to perform a similar feat during the Korean War.

During the First Indochina War, in Battle of Dien Bien Phu. A Viet Minh soldier named Phan Đình Giót sacrificed his life to fill the machine gun bunker of the French army to create opportunities for fellow soldiers to advance.

== In popular culture ==
Matrosov is the main character a number of books and of the 1947 war film, Private Alexander Matrosov (Рядовой Александр Матросов), directed by Leonid Lukov.

In the film Война (War) directed by Alexei Balabanov in 2002, a character introduces himself as Alexander Matrosov at the 57:24 mark.
