= Kilimovo =

Kilimovo Килимово
- Selo
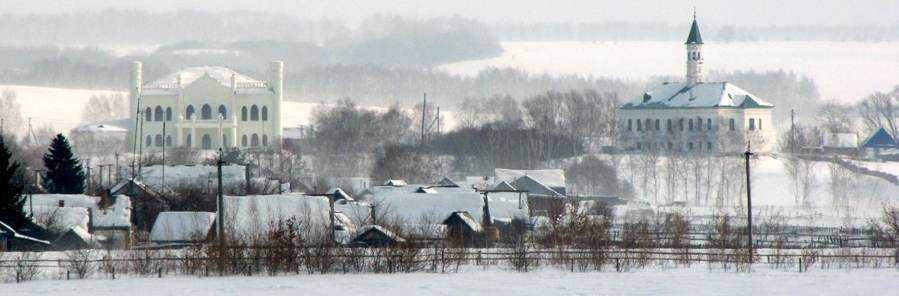

- Location within Bashkortostan Location within Russia
- Coordinates: 54°46′N 54°37′E
- Country: Russia
- Region: Bashkortostan
- District: Buzdyaksky District
- Time zone: UTC+5:00

Kilimovo (Russian: Килимово; Bashkir: Килем, Kilem) is a rural locality (a selo) and the administrative centre of Kilimovsky Selsoviet, Buzdyaksky District, Bashkortostan, Russia. The population was 797 as of 2010. There are 6 streets.

== Geography ==
Kilimovo is located 27 km north of Buzdyak (the district's administrative centre) by road. 6-ye Alkino is the nearest rural locality.
