= Governor's House, Ufa =

Historic building in Bashkortostan, Russia

Governor's House
- Дом губернатора (Russian)
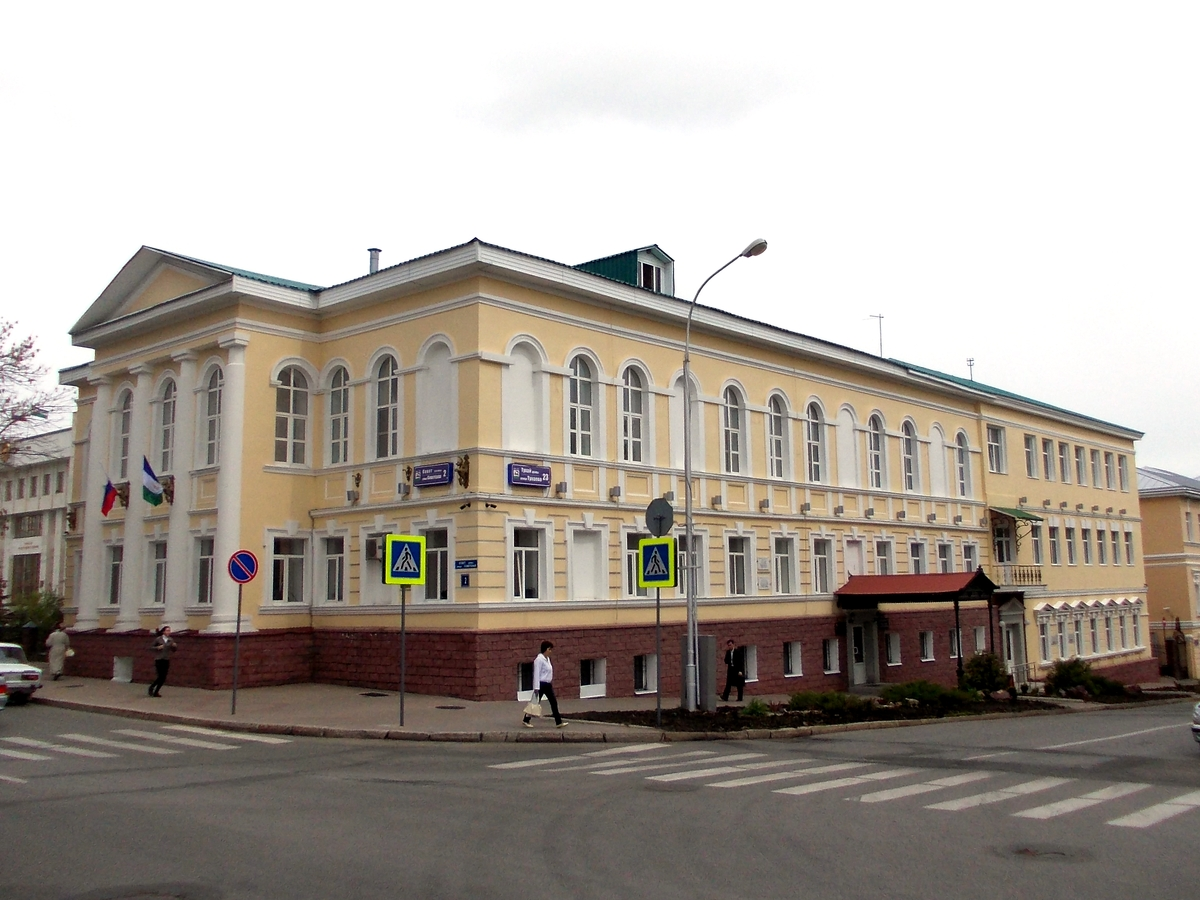
- Governor's House, 2012
- Interactive map of Governor's House
- 54°43′1″N 55°56′43″E
- Type: House / office
- Location: Ulitsa Tukayeva, 23; Ufa, Bashkortostan, 450000; Russia

History
- Built: 1832–1838

Site notes
- Architect: A. A. Gopius
- Architectural style: Neoclassical
- Owner: Ministry of Health (Bashkortostan)

The Governor's House (Russian: Дом губернатора, romanized: Dom gubernatora) is an historic neoclassical building on the corner of Tukayeva Street and Sovetskaya Street (formerly Gubernatorskaya Street), Ufa, the capital city of Bashkortostan, Russia. From the 1860s to the October Revolution of 1917, the house was the residence of the local governor. During the Soviet era, it was initially the headquarters of the Ufa Soviet, and was later occupied by medical institutions. Since 1999, it has housed the Ministry of Health of the Republic of Bashkortostan.

== History ==
The building that was to become the Governor's House was commissioned by a private resident of Ufa. A project of local architect A. A. Gopius, it was designed along the lines of the earlier neoclassical style of Andreyan Zakharov or William Heste. Construction of the house began in 1832, and by 1838 the building work had been largely concluded.

However, the house then stood without a roof for a long time until it was finally completed in 1849–50.

The house's completion also brought to an end the development of Ufa's Cathedral Square, an integrated neoclassical urban ensemble. According to a plan devised by William Heste, the Square evolved to become Ufa's entire administrative centre, consisting of the Government Offices (1839), Male Gymnasium (1830s), Theological Seminary (1827), and, most importantly, the Resurrection Cathedral.

In 1859, the house was purchased by the Treasury for official use as a governor's residence. Its first gubernatorial inhabitant was Grigory Aksakov, son of the famous writer Ivan Aksakov. From 1861, Grigory Aksakov was first civil governor of Orenburg Governorate, of which Ufa was the provincial city, and in May 1865, he became the head of the newly formed Ufa Governorate.

At the turn of the twentieth century, the life of the Governor's House could be summarised, predictably, as: "Breakfasts in the dining room, evening parties by the fireside, theatre plays in the hall." The building was also occupied by a range of committees and societies. In 1904, the first post office boxes were installed in Ufa; Box No. 1 was installed nearby.

After the October Revolution of 1917, the Ufa Council (Soviet) of Workers' and Soldiers' Deputies and the provincial revolutionary committee moved in. On 1 May 1918, Gubernatorskaya Street was renamed as Sovetskaya Street, and the house became the "House of Soviets". By the mid 1920s, however, the building had come to be occupied by medical institutions; it later housed the general dispensary, emergency station and polyclinic.

During the 1990s, the building was reconstructed, and unfortunately the main staircase and many interior and exterior details were lost: so, e.g., the columns of the main façade were deprived of their Ionic order capitals.

Since 1999, the building has housed the Ministry of Health of the Republic of Bashkortostan.

== Architecture ==
The building stands out among Ufa's buildings for its simplicity and proportion of forms. Its main façade, fronting Sovetskaya Street, is a symmetrical composition, decorated with cast-iron cast dragons that served as brackets for street lamps. At the centre of the facade is an avant-corps with four Ionic columns, and a triangular pediment.

The site of the Governor's House slopes downwards from Sovetskaya Street at its western end. The basement facing that street becomes the ground floor of the building as it extends to the east along Tukayeva Street, where that floor is notable for the austerity and rigour of its rustic design. Also facing Tukayeva Street is the entrance to the building, which is sheltered by a large cast-iron decorative canopy. The two floors above that level face both streets, and are more elegant, with decorative mouldings and, on the top floor, arched windows.

Initially, the house's interior configuration was that of a residential building: the main floor, at the Sovetskaya Street level, featured a drawing room, study and a hall, with the bedroom located in the mezzanine. Below that level were the kitchen, laundry and other utility rooms. At the time the house became the governor's residence, the city lacked a theatre building, and therefore the house also featured a stage with decorations, boxes and even green rooms. Later, an office and a two-story gallery were attached to the eastern end of the house, and its interior was reconstructed.
