= Phan Đình Giót =

Vietnamese war hero

- Born: 1922; Cẩm Xuyên district, Hà Tĩnh province, French Indochina
- Died: 13 March 1954 (aged 32); Him Lam, Điện Biên Phủ, Vietnam
- Military career
- Allegiance: Vietnam
- Branch: Vietnam People's Ground Force
- Battles: First Indochina War
- Awards: Hero of the People's Armed Forces, Military Exploit Order

Phan Đình Giót (1922– March 13, 1954) was one of 16 heroes of the People's Armed Forces honored for his achievements in the Dien Bien Phu campaign. His last position was Deputy Squad Leader of the 58th Infantry Company, 428th Battalion, 141st Regiment, 312th Division.

On March 13, 1954, he sacrificed himself at the age of 32 when he used his body to fill in loopholes to create an attack route on Him Lam hill.

== Biography ==
Phan Dinh Giot was born in Vinh Yen village (now hamlet 8), Cam Quan commune, Cẩm Xuyên district, Hà Tĩnh province. He was born into a very poor family. His father died of starvation. He had to live with others from the age of 13 and suffered hardships. After the August Revolution, Phan Dinh Giot joined the self-defense force. In 1950, Phan Dinh Giot volunteered to join the main force. Phan Dinh Giot participated in many major campaigns such as: Trung Du, Hòa Bình, Tây Bắc and Điện Biên Phủ.

== Sacrifice circumstances ==
In the winter of 1953, his unit was ordered to participate in the battle of Dien Bien Phu. The force of nearly 500 people crossed many steep passes and carried heavy loads, but he still persevered, helping his teammates reach the finish line.

On the afternoon of March 13, 1954, his unit attacked and destroyed the enemy in Him Lam.

The 58th Company troops rushed forward to clear the way, continuously hitting the eighth explosive. Phan Dinh Giot hit the ninth and was wounded in the thigh, but still volunteered to hit the tenth. The French concentrated their firepower and rained bullets down on the battlefield. The troops suffered many casualties.

After that, Phan Dinh Giot fired two more explosives in succession, breaking the last fence, opening the way for his comrades to attack the bunker at the bridgehead. The French army was confused, taking advantage of the opportunity, he rushed to attack bunker number 2, threw grenades, and provided support for the advancing unit. During this charge, he was wounded in the shoulder and thigh, losing a lot of blood.

Suddenly, the French soldiers' bunker number 3 fired heavily. The Vietnamese assault force was stopped, Phan Dinh Giot crawled to bunker number 2 with the intention of immediately extinguishing this bunker. Phan Dinh Giot used all his strength (while he was wounded and bleeding) to raise his submachine gun and shoot into the loophole, shouting loudly:

"Determined to sacrifice... for the Party... for the people"

— Phan Đình Giót

Phan Dinh Giot stretched out to gain momentum, using his body to cover the enemy's loophole. Suddenly, the sound of gunfire ceased, but Phan Dinh Giot was fatally struck as French bullets tore through him, leaving his body in pieces. His sacrifice filled the loophole, effectively trapping the French soldiers inside, who could no longer shoot. This allowed the Vietnamese army to seize the opportunity to attack and ultimately destroy the Him Lam stronghold on March 13, 1954, winning the opening battle of the Dien Bien Phu campaign.

Phan Dinh Giot died at 10:30 p.m. on March 13, 1954, at the age of 32. He was one of 16 heroes of the people's armed forces honored for their achievements during the Dien Bien Phu campaign.

== Honours ==
On March 31, 1955, Phan Dinh Giot was posthumously awarded the title of Hero of the People's Armed Forces. Later, he was posthumously awarded the Second Class Military Exploit Order. His souvenir canteen and gun are preserved at the 1st Corps museum.

Currently, many provinces and cities have streets named after him such as Hanoi (Hoang Mai district and Hà Đông district), Pleiku city, Kon Tum city.
