= Ministry of Health (Bashkortostan) =

Agency of the government of Bashkortostan

Republic of Bashkortostan Ministry of Health
- Başkortostan Respublikahı; Haulık Haklau Ministrlığı

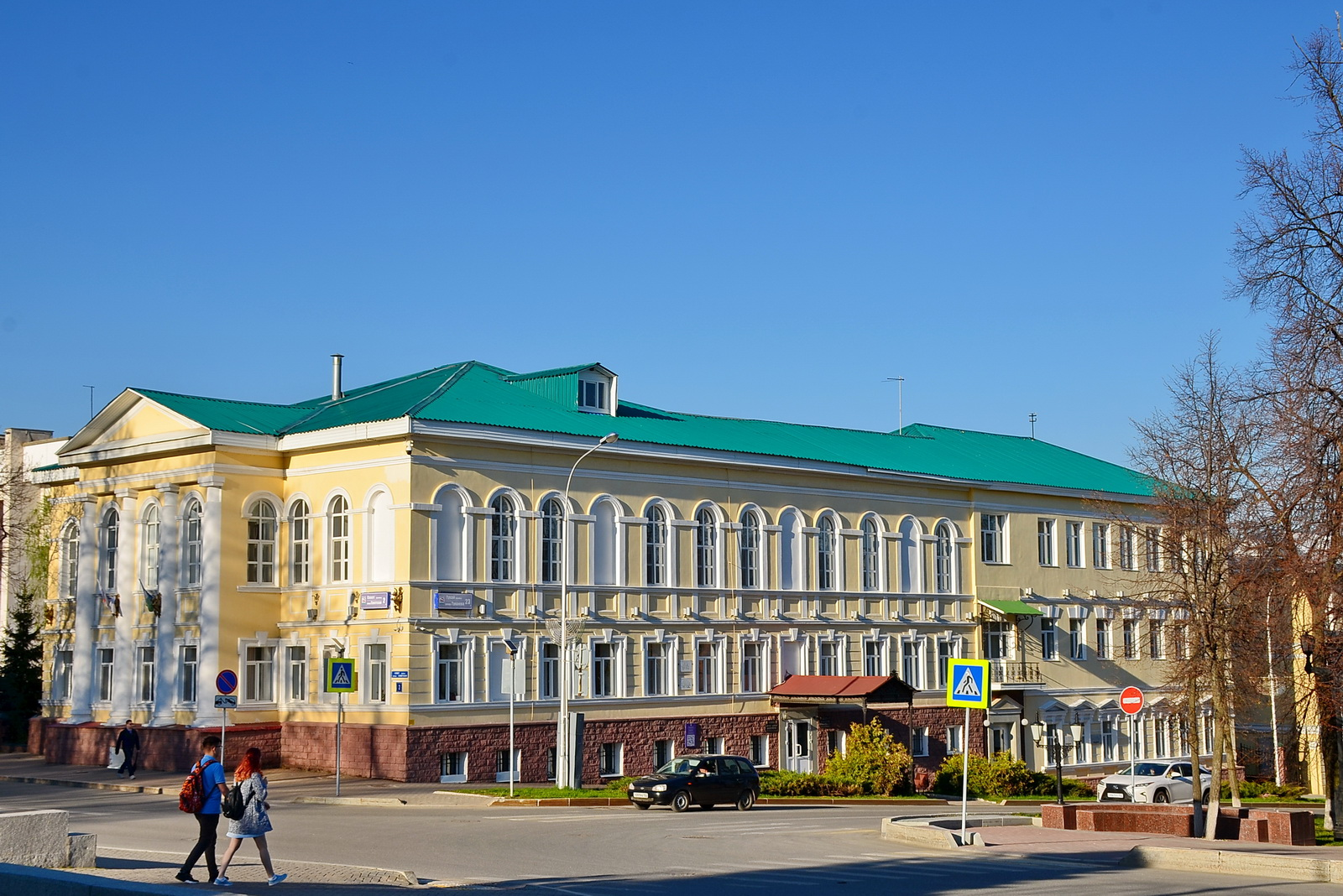
- Building of the Ministry of Health

Agency overview
- Jurisdiction: Government of the Republic of Bashkortostan
- Headquarters: Governor's House, 23, Tukaev Street, Ufa, 450002, Russia; 54.716944°N 55.945225°E
- Website: https://health.bashkortostan.ru/

The Ministry of Health of the Republic of Bashkortostan (Bashkir: Başkortostan Respublikahı Haulık Haklau Ministrlığı) is an agency of the government of Bashkortostan, headquartered in Governor's House, Ufa.

== Ministers ==
After the 2018 Head of the Ministry of Health has been Mikhail Zabelin.
