= Harold L. Sheppard =

American sociologist

Harold Lloyd Sheppard (1922–1997) was an American sociologist and academic.

== Biography ==
Sheppard received his master's degree in sociology from the University of Chicago in 1945 and his Ph.D. in sociology and anthropology from the University of Wisconsin in 1949.

Sheppard held academic positions at Wayne State University and the University of South Florida, and he served as a visiting lecturer at universities in France and Germany. He also worked in government and private sectors, including as a White House counselor on aging during the Carter Administration and collaborating with labor unions and organizations focused on aging issues.

Sheppard's research focused on the challenges faced by older workers, particularly in the context of job loss and retirement. His 1959 study, Too Old to Work, Too Young to Retire: A Case Study of a Permanent Plant Shutdown, examined the impact of the closure of Packard's Detroit facility on its older workers.

Sheppard authored, co-authored, and edited books and articles on aging and employment, including Where Have All the Robots Gone? (1972), The Graying of Working America (1979), and The Future of Older Workers (1990).

From 1983 to 1991, Sheppard served as the director of the International Exchange Center on Gerontology at the University of South Florida, where he continued his professorship until his death in 1997.
