= Samara State Medical University =

- Самарский государственный медицинский университет
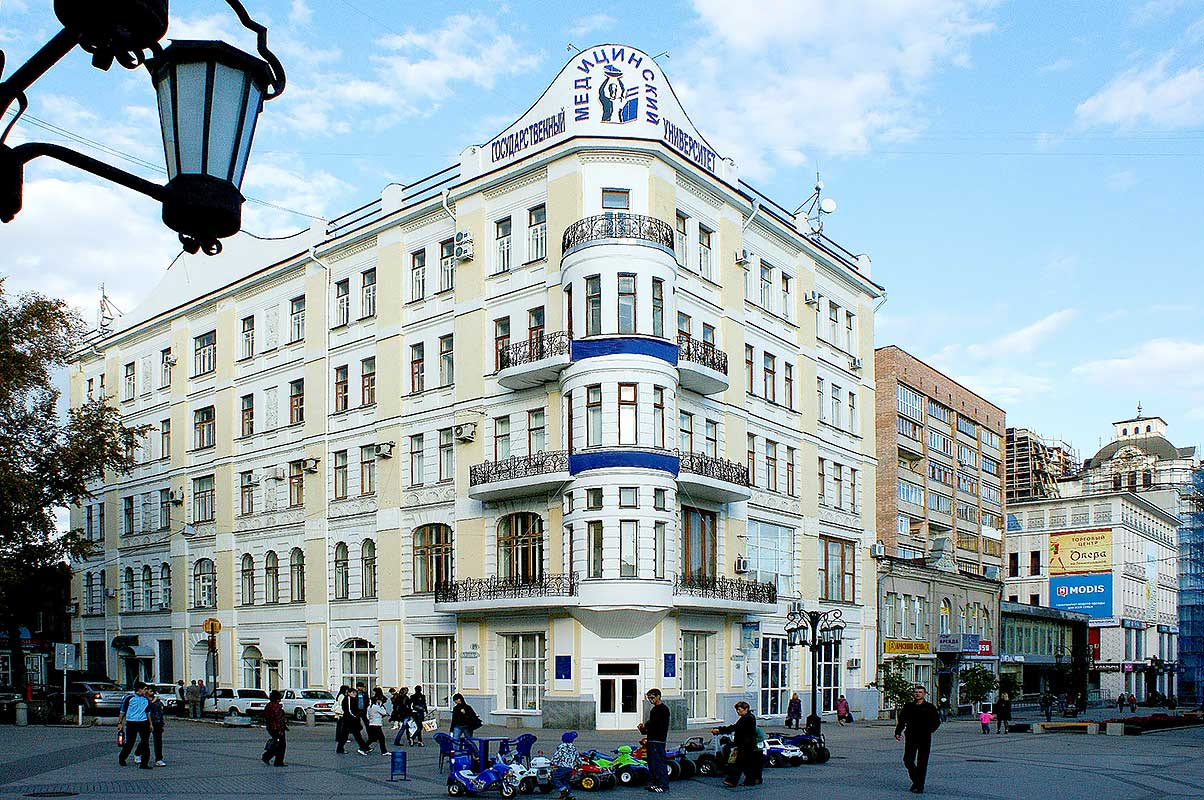
- Motto: Arte et humanitate, labore et scientia
- Type: Public
- Established: 12 July 1930
- President: Gennady Kotelnikov
- Rector: Aleksandr Kolsanov
- Students: ~ 7,000
- Location: Chapayevskaya 89, Samara, Russia; 53°11′13″N 50°05′39″E
- Campus: Urban
- Nickname: SamGMU (Russian: СамГМУ)
- Website: www.samsmu.ru

Samara State Medical University (Russian: Самарский государственный медицинский университет) is a public higher medical educational institution in Samara, Russia. It trains civilian specialists with higher education in medicine, pharmacy, economics, and the humanities, from general education institutions to doctoral programs. The opening of this university was preceded by the existence of the Faculty of Medicine of Samara State University (1919–1927) at the Provincial Zemstvo Hospital, which was closed due to lack of funding. It is the parent university of the Samara Military Medical Institute (1999–2006) and Reaviz University (since 1993).

== History ==
The university was founded in 1930 as the Middle Volga Regional Medical Institute (1930-1934), later renamed the Samara Medical Institute (1934-1935), Kuibyshev Medical Institute (1935-1939). It underwent significant reorganization in 1939, when the 2nd Kuibyshev Military Medical Academy (1939-1942) was created on its basis. After relocating to Samarkand, it was reorganized for the second time into the Kuibyshev Medical Institute named after D. I. Ulyanov (1942-1990), then - Samara Medical Institute (1990-1992). From 1943 to 1965 it was a single-faculty institute, from 1965 to 1990 - a multi-faculty one. Renowned Russian scientists—surgeon and clinical anatomist V. F. Voyno-Yasenetsky and microbiologist N. F. Gamaleya—were selected to join the faculty of KMI-SamSMU through a competition, but they were not hired. The Department of Obstetrics and Gynecology at KVMA was headed by I. F. Zhordania, the founder of Russian gynecology.

Since 2019, the university's rector has been Alexander Kolsanov, Doctor of Medical Sciences, Professor, Honored Scientist of the Russian Federation (2023), and Professor of the Russian Academy of Sciences.

== Structure ==
The university's structure includes educational institutes, research institutes, its own clinics, scientific and educational centers, innovative infrastructure, research laboratories, as well as the Samara State Medical University Scientific Library (with a collection of over 600,000 volumes), three internet centers with 120 seats, and over 20 multimedia and computer labs.

The university successfully operates six dissertation councils in 15 specialties. Postgraduate and doctoral research training is conducted in 38 specialties.

Over 7,000 students study at the university annually, including approximately 350 international students. The university has a faculty of over 1,500, including two academicians of the Russian Academy of Sciences, eight Honored Scientists of Russia, three Honored Workers of Higher Education of the Russian Federation, and 19 Honored Doctors of Russia. Five of its own buildings and over 35 clinical institutions in the city and region serve as teaching facilities.

=== Educational Institutes ===
The university has 8 educational institutes:

- Institute of Clinical Medicine (General Medicine)
- Institute of Pediatrics (Pediatrics)
- Institute of Dentistry (Dentistry)
- Institute of Pharmacy (Pharmacy)
- Institute of Preventive Medicine (Preventive Medicine)
- Institute of Social, Humanitarian, and Digital Development of Medicine (Clinical Psychology, Medical Cybernetics)
- Institute of Nursing Education
- Institute of Professional Education

=== Research Institutes ===
- Research Institute of Hematology, Transfusiology, and Intensive Care
- Research Institute of Restorative Medicine and Rehabilitation
- Research Institute of Cardiology
- Research Institute of Bionics and Personalized Medicine
- Research Institute of Neuroscience
