= Medal of the Order "For Merit to the Fatherland" =

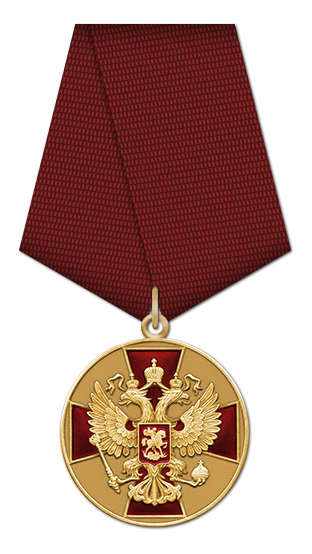
- First Class Civilian Medal of the Order "For Merit to the Fatherland"
- Type: Two grade medal in civil and military divisions
- Awarded for: Outstanding contributions to the state
- Presented by: Russian Federation
- Eligibility: Russian citizens
- Status: Active
- Established: 2 March 1994
- Ribbon of the medal 1st class Ribbon of the medal 2nd class

Order of Wear
- Next (higher): Cross of St. George
- Next (lower): Medal "For Courage"
- Related: Order "For Merit to the Fatherland"

The Medal of the Order "For Merit to the Fatherland" (Russian: Медаль ордена «За заслуги перед Отечеством», romanized: Medal ordena "Za zaslugi pered Otechestvom") is a Russian medal. It was established on 2 March 1994 by Presidential Decree No.442. Its award criteria were modified on 6 January 1999 by Presidential Decree 19 and again on 7 September 2010 by Presidential Decree 1099. The medal of the Order is divided into two classes, the first and the second, it is further divided into a civilian and a military division, the medal of the military division is awarded "with swords" and its criteria differ from those of the civilian division.

== Statute of the medal ==
- Civilian Division first and second class. Awarded to citizens of the Russian Federation for outstanding achievements in various fields of industry, construction, science, education, health, culture, transport and other areas of work.
- Military Division first and second class. Awarded to members of the Armed Forces of the Russian Federation for great contribution to the defence of the Motherland, for success in maintaining the high combat readiness of the central organs of military administration, of military units and organizations, for strengthening the rule of law and order, for ensuring public safety.

== Award description ==
The Medal of the Order "For Merit to the Fatherland" is 32mm in diameter and made of silver, the medal first class is gold plated. The obverse bears a likeness of the Order, a crowned double headed eagle over a red-enamel cross pattée. On the reverse, the motto of the Order: "BENEFIT, HONOUR AND GLORY" (Russian: ПОЛЬЗА, ЧЕСТЬ И СЛАВА, romanized: POLZA, CHEST I SLAVA). At the bottom, laurel leaves, the year of establishment "1994" and the award serial number. In the case of the military division, the sword device is added between the medal suspension ring and the pentagonal mount. The medal hangs from a standard Russian pentagonal mount covered by an overlapping scarlet ribbon.

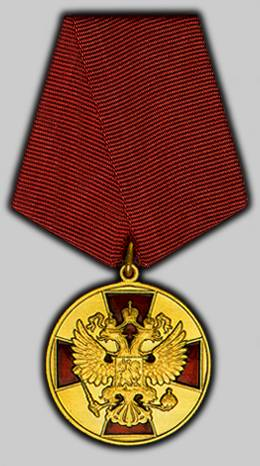
Medal I class
Civilian Division

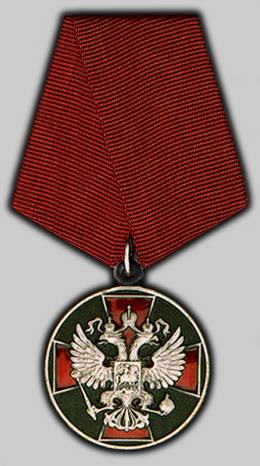
Medal II class
Civilian Division

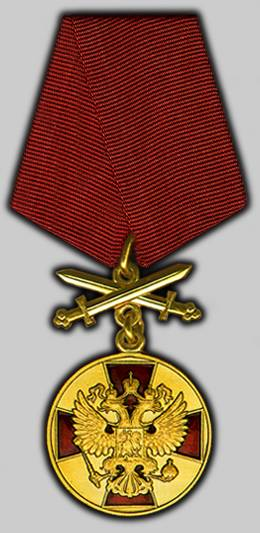
Medal I class
Military Division

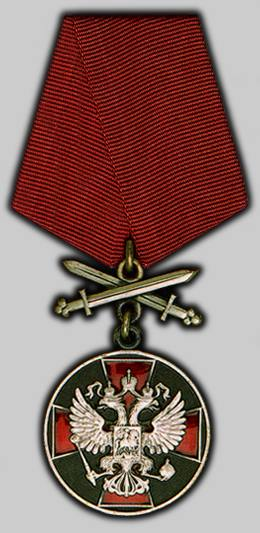
Medal II class
Military Division

== Notable recipients ==
- Sergey Tetyukhin
- Aleksey Aleksandrov
- Nikolay Baskov
- Alexander Chekalin
- Vladimir Dementyev
- Andrey Filatov
- Vladimir Grachev
- Dmitry Sukharev
- Alexey Gordeyev
- Ilona Korstin
- Mikhail Pletnev
- Svetlana Vanyo
- Anatoli Boukreev
- Vyacheslav Borisov
- Alexandra Trusova
- Vladimir Kostitsyn
- Irik Zhdanov
- Alfred Grishin
- Magomed Tushayev
- Sergey Karjakin
- Alexander Strizhakov
- Victor Sumsky
- Eduard Khudaynatov
- Evgeny Vyborov
- Petr Yan

== See also ==
- Awards and decorations of the Russian Federation
